= Karl Holz (violinist) =

Austrian violinist (1798–1858)

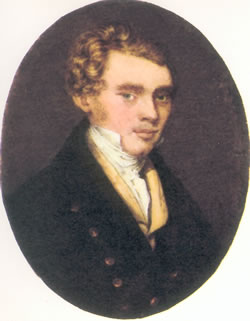
Karl Holz, violinist and confidant of Beethoven

Karl Holz (1798 – 9 November 1858) was an Austrian violinist. He played second violin in Ignaz Schuppanzigh's string quartet and served as secretary to Ludwig van Beethoven during the last few years of the composer's life. He was also close with Franz Schubert.

== Early career ==
In Vienna in 1819, the violinist Joseph Böhm assembled a new string quartet, and Holz – a civil servant in the Austrian government by profession – joined as second violin. In 1823, the violinist Ignaz Schuppanzigh returned to the city after several years away. He had formed a string quartet in Vienna in the 1790s; Schuppanzigh was an old friend of Beethoven's and had given the first performance of the composer's first six string quartets Op. 18. Böhm's quartet disbanded, and Holz joined Schuppanzigh's reformed quartet.

In 1824, Beethoven, who had not written a string quartet since his Op. 95 in 1810, began work on a commission from Prince Nicholas Galitzin to write three string quartets. The first of these, the String Quartet Op. 127, was given its first performance by Schuppanzigh's quartet the following year. The quartet later performed the other two works commissioned, the String Quartet Op. 130 and String Quartet Op. 132.

== Beethoven's secretary ==
In 1825, while Holz was working as a copyist for Beethoven, the composer fired his current secretary, Anton Schindler; Beethoven then engaged Holz as his secretary. Letters to Holz and entries in Beethoven's conversation books (used when conversing with the deaf composer in his later years) show that Holz was a devoted admirer, and of great help to the composer. After Beethoven reconciled with Schindler in 1826, Holz retained his position as the composer's secretary, while Schindler assisted Holz in managing Beethoven's affairs.

Some years later, Holz talked to the music scholar Ludwig Nohl about the composer during the time of writing the late quartets: "While composing the three quartets requested by Prince Galitzin, such a wealth of new quartet ideas flowed from Beethoven's inexhaustible imagination that he virtually had to write the Quartets in C-Sharp Minor and F Major involuntarily. 'My dear fellow, I've just had another idea,' he would say jocularly and with glistening eyes when we were out walking, and would write down a few notes in his sketchbook."

Also as told to Ludwig Nohl, Holz said, "For him the crowning achievement of his quartet writing, and his favourite piece, was the E-Flat Cavatina in 3/4 time from the Quartet in B-Flat Major Op. 130. He actually composed it in tears of melancholy (during the summer of 1825) and confessed to me that his own music had never had such an effect on him before, and that even thinking back to that piece cost him fresh tears."

== After Beethoven ==
In 1829, Holz became a director of the Concerts Spirituels, a series of concerts in Vienna, which had been established in 1819. (They were based on the Concert Spirituel series of concerts in Paris during religious holidays.) As director, Holz frequently programmed works of Beethoven in the concerts.

Following the death of Ignaz Schuppanzigh in 1830, Leopold Jansa, a violinist and composer, formed a string quartet with Holz and another member of Schuppanzigh's quartet, the cellist Josef Linke.
