= Joseph Linke =

Cellist and composer (1783 - 1837)

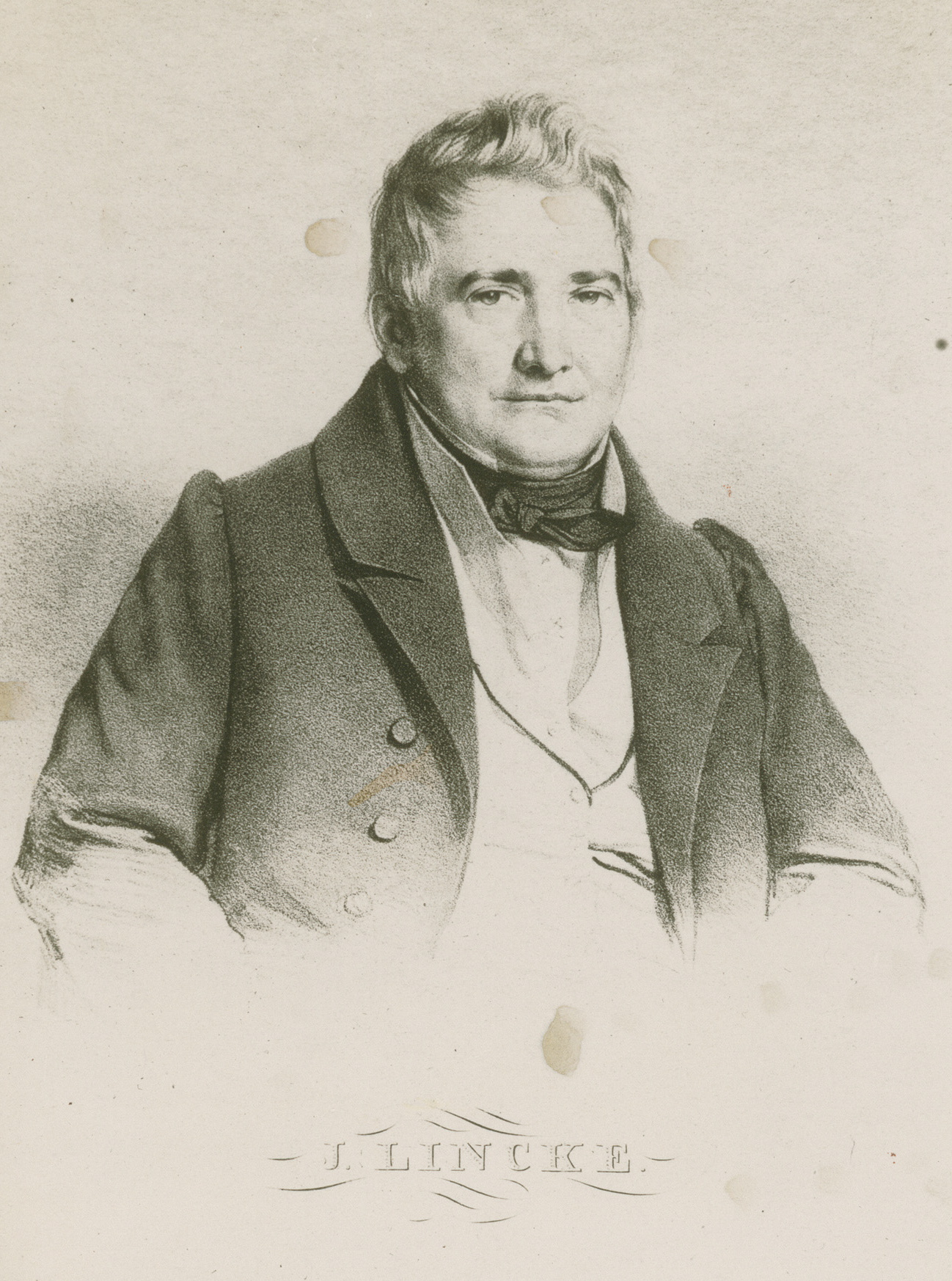
Joseph Linke

Joseph Linke (also spelled Joseph Lincke, Josef Linke; 8 June 1783 – 26 March 1837) was a cellist and composer who had a distinguished career in Vienna, as a soloist and as a member of the Schuppanzigh Quartet. He took part in the first performances of string quartets and other chamber works of Ludwig van Beethoven and Franz Schubert.

== Early life and career ==
Linke was born in Trachenberg in Silesia (now Żmigród in Poland). His father, a violinist at the chapel of Prince Hatzfeld, taught him the violin. He was an orphan at the age of ten, and supported himself by copying music. In 1800 he became a violinist in the Dominican convent at Breslau; he studied cello with Lose, the first cellist of the Breslau Opera House, where Carl Maria von Weber was the conductor. On Lose's departure, Linke succeeded him in the theatre orchestra.

He moved to Vienna in 1808, and became the cellist in a string quartet which Count Andrey Razumovsky had commissioned the violinist Ignaz Schuppanzigh to set up; Schuppanzigh's quartet gave concerts in the Count's palace. In December 1808, Schuppanzigh, Linke and Beethoven gave the first performances of Beethoven's two piano trios Op. 70, and in 1814 they gave the first performance of Beethoven's Piano Trio Op. 97 (the "Archduke Trio"). In 1815 Beethoven wrote for Linke the two Cello Sonatas Op. 102.

Linke remained with Schuppanzigh's quartet until it was disbanded, after the Count's palace partly burnt down on 31 December 1814. Schuppanzigh left Vienna for several years. Linke was attached to the household of Anna Maria Erdődy, a Hungarian noblewoman and close friend and patron of Beethoven. She employed Linke as a second music tutor (after Johann Xaver Brauchle) to her three children. He accompanied them to Paukovec, Croatia, where the family was to reside, after the whole household left Vienna in 1815.

== Later years ==
Linke returned to Vienna in 1818, where he was a soloist in the orchestra of the Theater an der Wien. He was in a quartet assembled in 1819 by the violinist Joseph Böhm, in which the other players were Karl Holz and Franz Weiss, both formerly with Schuppanzigh's quartet.

Schuppanzigh returned to Vienna in 1823, and Linke joined his re-established quartet, with Karl Holz and Franz Weiss. In 1824 Beethoven, who had not written a string quartet since his Op. 95 in 1810, composed his String Quartet Op. 127, and in the following year Schuppanzigh's quartet gave the first performance of this work. They later performed his String Quartet Op. 130 and String Quartet Op. 132. The quartet also gave the first performance of Schubert's A minor Quartet (D. 804)

After Schuppanzigh's death in 1830 he was in a quartet assembled in 1834 by the violinist Leopold Jansa.

Linke composed several works for the cello, including a cello concerto.

He died in 1837; he was described in an obituary in the music magazine Neue Zeitschrift für Musik:

He was a great friend of Beethoven, who wrote much for him. His way of presenting Beethoven's compositions was unique, and I have never heard any other cellists with this interpretation, which according to circumstances could be flattering, aggressive, capricious, passionate etc., in short expressing himself in the moods required, and so rendering Beethoven's essential manner.
