= String Quartet No. 13 =

String Quartet No. 13 may refer to:

- String Quartet No. 13 (Beethoven) by Ludwig van Beethoven
- String Quartet No. 13 (Dvořák) by Antonín Dvořák
- String Quartet No. 13 (Hill) by Alfred Hill
- String Quartet No. 13 (Maconchy), Quartetto corto by Elizabeth Maconchy
- String Quartet No. 13 (Milhaud), Op. 268, by Darius Milhaud
- String Quartet No. 13 (Mozart) by Wolfgang Amadeus Mozart
- String Quartet No. 13 (Schubert), Rosamunde by Franz Schubert
- String Quartet No. 13 (Shostakovich) by Dmitri Shostakovich
- String Quartet No. 13 (Spohr) by Louis Spohr
- String Quartet No. 13 (Villa-Lobos) by Heitor Villa-Lobos
