= String Quartet No. 12 =

String Quartet No. 12 may refer to:

- String Quartet No. 12 (Beethoven) by Ludwig van Beethoven
- String Quartet No. 12 (Dvořák), American, by Antonín Dvořák
- String Quartet No. 12 (Hill) by Alfred Hill
- String Quartet No. 12 (Maconchy) by Elizabeth Maconchy
- String Quartet No. 12 (Milhaud), Op. 252, by Darius Milhaud
- String Quartet No. 12 (Mozart) by Wolfgang Amadeus Mozart
- String Quartet No. 12 (Schubert) by Franz Schubert
- String Quartet No. 12 (Shostakovich) by Dmitri Shostakovich
- String Quartet No. 12 (Spohr) by Louis Spohr
- String Quartet No. 12 (Villa-Lobos) by Heitor Villa-Lobos
