= Andrey Razumovsky =

Russian diplomat (1752–1836)

- Андрей Разумовский
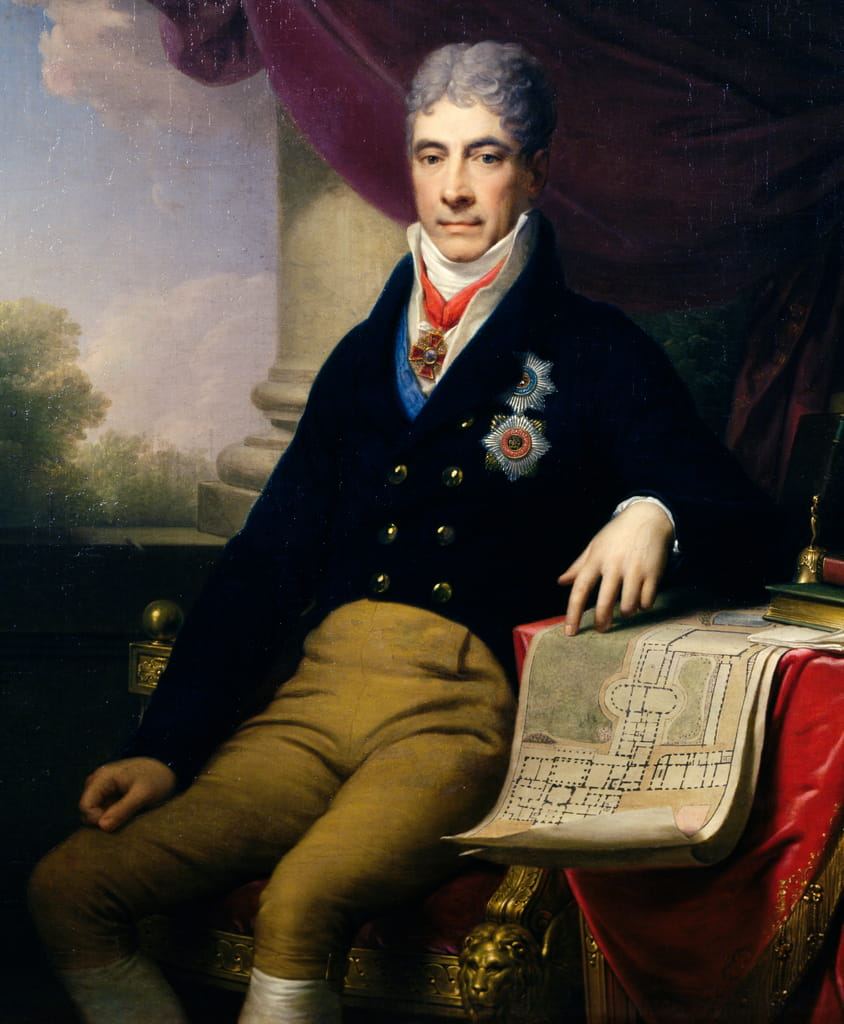
- Portrait of Razumovsky from 1810 by Austrian artist Lampi the Younger
- Born: 2 November 1752; Glukhov, Cossack Hetmanate, Russian Empire
- Died: 23 September 1836 (aged 83); Vienna, Austrian Empire
- Occupations: Diplomat, patronage
- Father: Kirill Razumovsky

Count (later Prince) Andrey Kirillovich Razumovsky (Note: Russian: Андре́й Кири́ллович Разумо́вский, romanized: Andryéy Kiríllovich Razumóvskiy; Ukrainian: Андрі́й Кири́лович Розумо́вський, romanized: Andriy Kirilovich Rozumovskyi; German: Andreas von Rasumofsky) (2 November 1752 – 23 September 1836) was a Russian diplomat who spent many years of his life in Vienna. His name is transliterated differently in different English sources, including spellings Razumovsky, Rasumofsky, and Rasoumoffsky. (Note: This last spelling was used by the British Government for its official translation from the French of the Paris peace treaty of 1815 and the Final Act of the Congress of Vienna.)

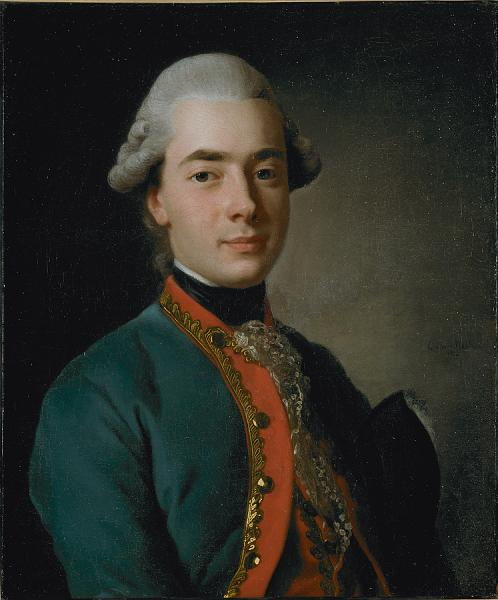
Portrait by Alexander Roslin 1776

== Life ==
Razumovsky was the son of Kirill Razumovsky, the last hetman of the Zaporizhian Host, and of his wife, Catherine Naryshkina, a cousin of Elizabeth of Russia. He was also a nephew of the Elizabeth's lover, Aleksey Grigorievich Razumovsky, called the "Night Emperor" of Russia. The elder Rasumovsky's late Baroque palace on the Nevsky Prospekt is a minor landmark in Saint Petersburg. In 1792, Andrey Kirillovich was appointed the tsar's diplomatic representative to the Habsburg court in Vienna, one of the crucial diplomatic posts during the Napoleonic era.

In 1779, Razumovsky became the first Russian ambassador in the Kingdom of Naples. He was a chief negotiator during the Congress of Vienna that re-organised Europe in 1814, and asserted Russian rights in Poland.

In 1808, he established a house string quartet consisting of Ignaz Schuppanzigh, Louis Sina, Franz Weiss, and Joseph Linke. Razumovsky was an accomplished amateur violinist, and also known as a competent torban (see also: theorbo) player. The Kunsthistorisches Museum in Vienna holds one of the four torbans known to have been in his possession. His commissioning three string quartets from Beethoven in 1806 was the act that has made his name familiar. He asked Beethoven to include a Russian theme in each quartet: Beethoven included such kind of themes in the first two.

Razumovsky was the brother-in-law of another of Beethoven's patrons, Prince Joseph Franz von Lobkowitz. His first wife, Countess Elisabeth von Thun und Hohenstein was a sister in law of Karl Alois, Prince Lichnowsky von Woschütz.

== The Palais Rasumofsky ==
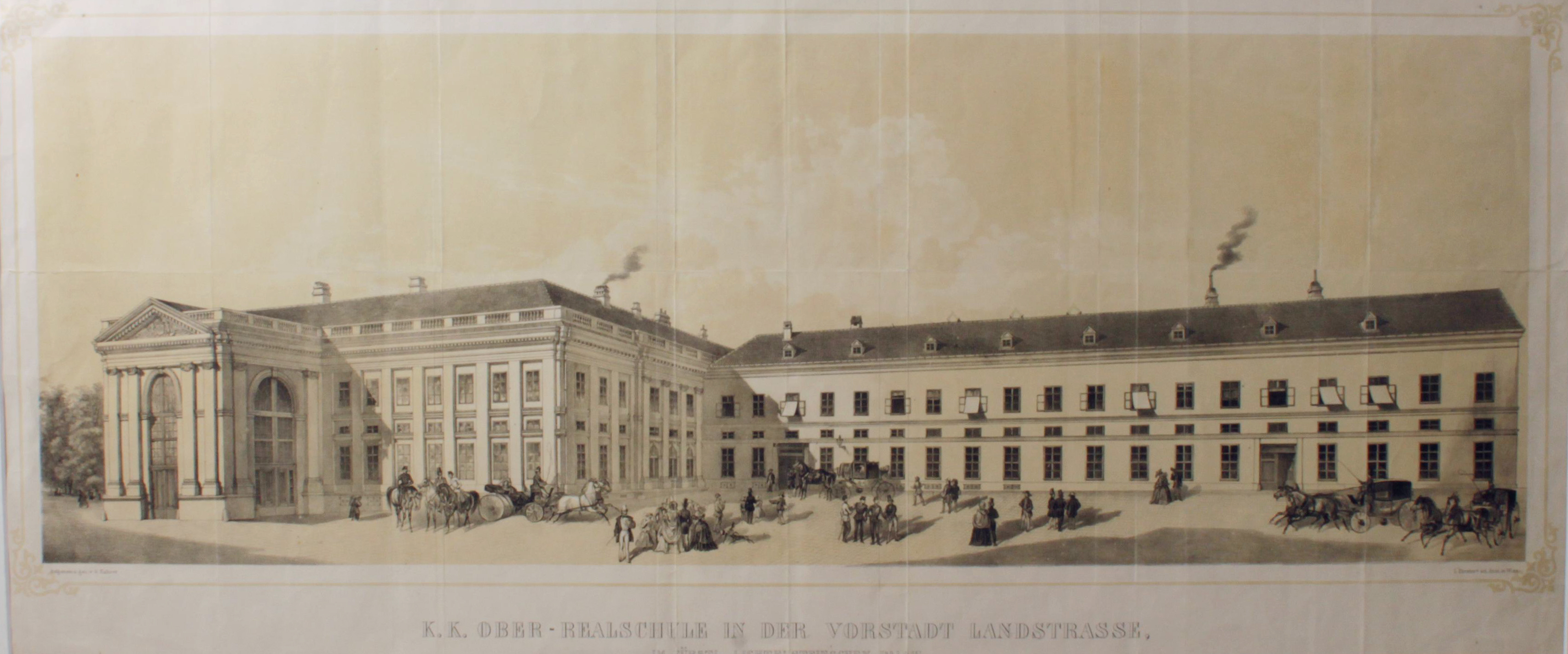
Palais Rasumofsky, Vienna.

Razumovsky built a magnificent Neoclassic palace worthy of the representative of Alexander I, at his own expense and to the designs of Louis Montoyer, on the Landstraße, quite close to Vienna, and filled it with antiquities and modern works of art. In the morning of 31 December 1814, during the preparation of a ball with the Tsar Alexander I as guest of honor, a fire broke out in a temporary ballroom extension, setting the ballroom ablaze and burning out roomfuls of art in the back wing of the palace. Even though he was raised to Prince the following year, Razumovsky was never the same. He lived in seclusion in Vienna until his death in 1836. In 1862, the street on which Razumovsky's palace is located was named Rasumofskygasse.

== Conversion to Roman Catholicism ==
Razumovsky converted to Roman Catholicism from his native religion, Russian Orthodoxy, under the influence of his second wife, Countess Konstanze von Thürheim (1785–1867), member of uradel noble family from Swabia and sister of his friend Lulu von Thürheim, whom he married in February 1816.

== Andrey Razumovsky Musical Fest ==
On October 22, 2015 a long-awaited musical event - Andrey Razumovsky IV Regional musical festival-competition of young performers took place in Hetman Razumovsky Palace in Baturin. This tradition started in 2012 in Baturin palace at the time of the 260 birthday anniversary of Andrey Razumovsky. He is world-known for his role as patron of Ludwig van Beethoven who dedicated three String Quartets, Op. 59 1, 2 and 3, as well as the 5th and the 6th Symphonies to him.

== See also ==
- Razumovsky and Naryshkin, his family
- Nikolai Borisovich Galitzin, another Russian prince and patron of Beethoven
