= String Quartet No. 14 (Schubert) =

1824 string quartet by Franz Schubert

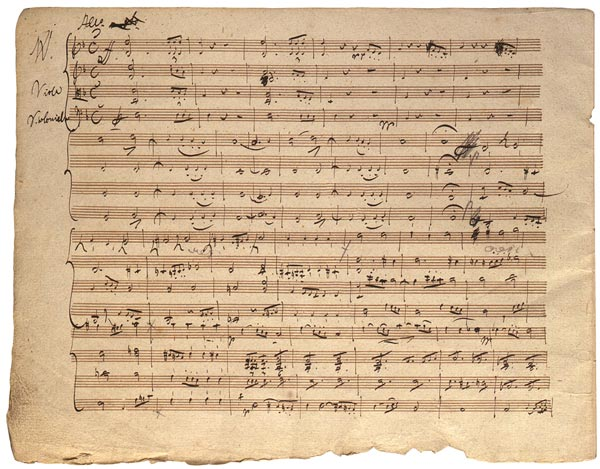
Original manuscript of Death and the Maiden quartet, from the Mary Flagler Cary Music Collection, Morgan Library, New York

The String Quartet No. 14 in D minor, D 810, known as Death and the Maiden, is a piece by Franz Schubert that has been called "one of the pillars of the chamber music repertoire". It was composed in 1824, after the composer suffered from a serious illness and realized that he was dying. It is named for the theme of the second movement, which Schubert took from a song he wrote in 1817 of the same title. But, writes Walter Willson Cobbett, all four movements of the quartet are welded "into a unity under the pressure of a dominating idea – the dance of death."

The quartet was first played in 1826 in a private home, and was not published until 1831, three years after Schubert's death.

== Composition ==
1823 and 1824 were hard years for Schubert. For much of 1823 he was sick, some scholars believe with an outburst of tertiary stage syphilis, and in May had to be hospitalized. He was also without money: he had entered into a disastrous deal with Anton Diabelli to publish a batch of works, and received almost no payment; and his latest attempt at opera, Fierrabras, was a flop. In a letter to a friend, he wrote,

Think of a man whose health can never be restored, and who from sheer despair makes matters worse instead of better. Think, I say, of a man whose brightest hopes have come to nothing, to whom love and friendship are but torture, and whose enthusiasm for the beautiful is fast vanishing; and ask yourself if such a man is not truly unhappy.

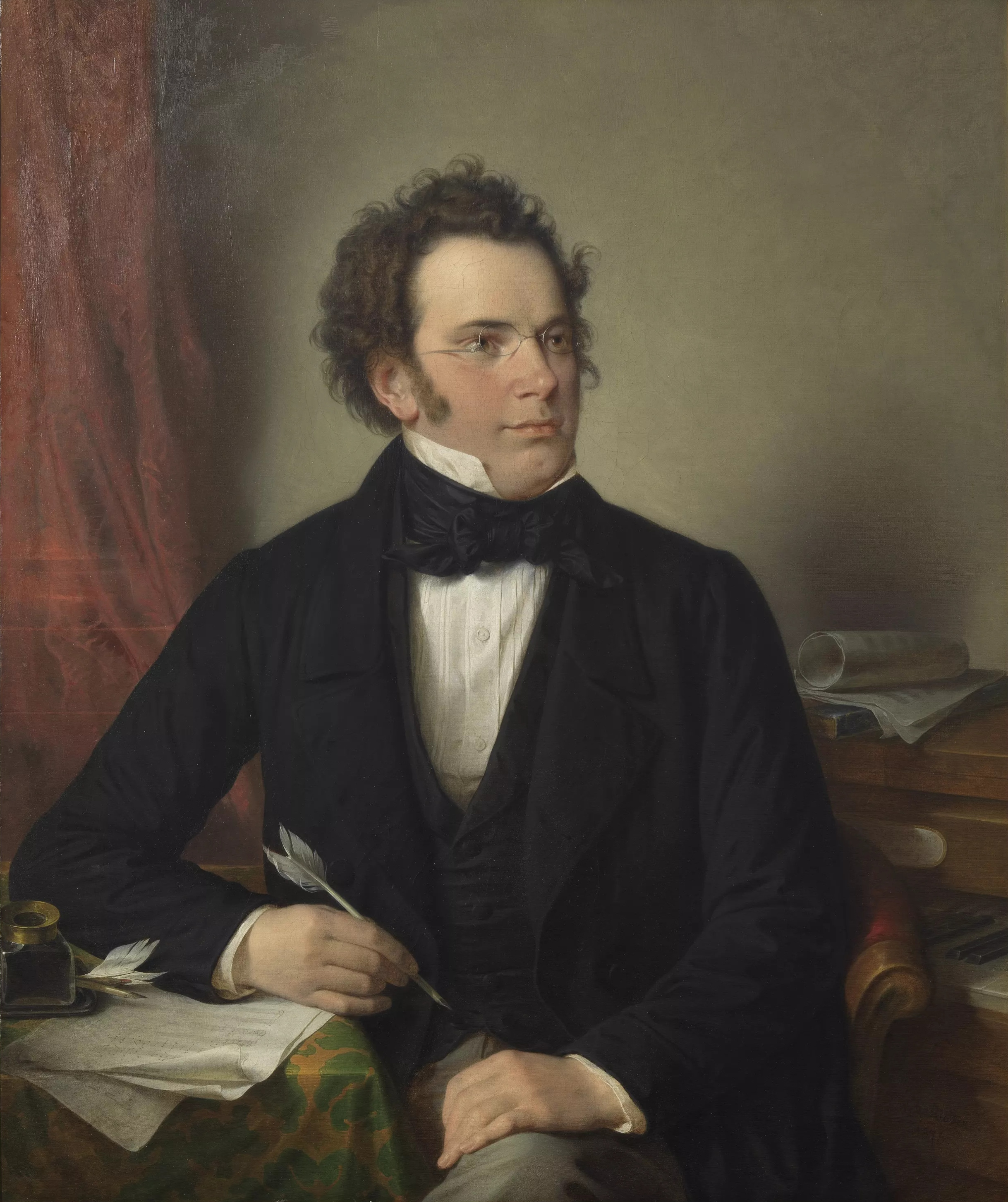
Franz Schubert in 1825 (painting by Wilhelm August Rieder)

Yet, despite his bad health, poverty, and depression, Schubert continued to turn out the tuneful, light, and gemütlich music that made him the toast of Viennese society: the song cycle Die schöne Müllerin, the octet for string quartet, contrabass, clarinet, horn and bassoon, more than 20 songs, and numerous light pieces for piano.

After 1820, Schubert returned to the string quartet form, which he had last visited as a teenager. He wrote the one-movement Quartettsatz in 1820, and the Rosamunde quartet in 1824 using a theme from the incidental music that he wrote for a play that failed. These quartets are a huge step forward from his initial attempts. Even Schubert recognized this fact; in July 1824, he wrote to his brother Ferdinand of his earlier quartets, "it would be better if you stuck to other quartets than mine, for there is nothing in them..." There are several qualities that set these mature quartets apart from Schubert's earlier attempts. In the early quartets, it is primarily the first violin that carries the melody, with the other instruments playing supporting roles; in the later quartets, the part writing is much more advanced, and each instrument brings its own character and presence, for a more complex and integrated texture. Also, the later quartets are structurally much more integrated, with motifs, harmonies, and textures recurring in a way that ties the entire work together.

But beyond these technical improvements, Schubert in these later works made the quartet medium his own. "He had now ceased to write quartets to order, for experimental study, or for the home circle", writes Walter Willson Cobbett. "To the independent artist... the string quartet had now also become a vehicle for conveying to the world his inner struggles." For Schubert, who lived a life suspended between the lyrical, romantic, charming and the dramatic, chaotic, and depressive, the string quartet offered a medium "to reconcile his essentially lyric themes with his feeling for dramatic utterance within a form that provided the possibility of extreme color contrasts", writes music historian Homer Ulrich.

Schubert wrote the D minor quartet in March 1824, within weeks of completing the A minor Rosamunde quartet. He apparently planned to publish a three-set volume of quartets; but the Rosamunde was published within a year, while the D minor quartet was only published in 1831, three years after Schubert's death, by Diabelli. It was first played in January 1826 at the Vienna home of Karl and Franz Hacker, amateur violinists, apparently with Schubert on the viola.

== Inspiration ==
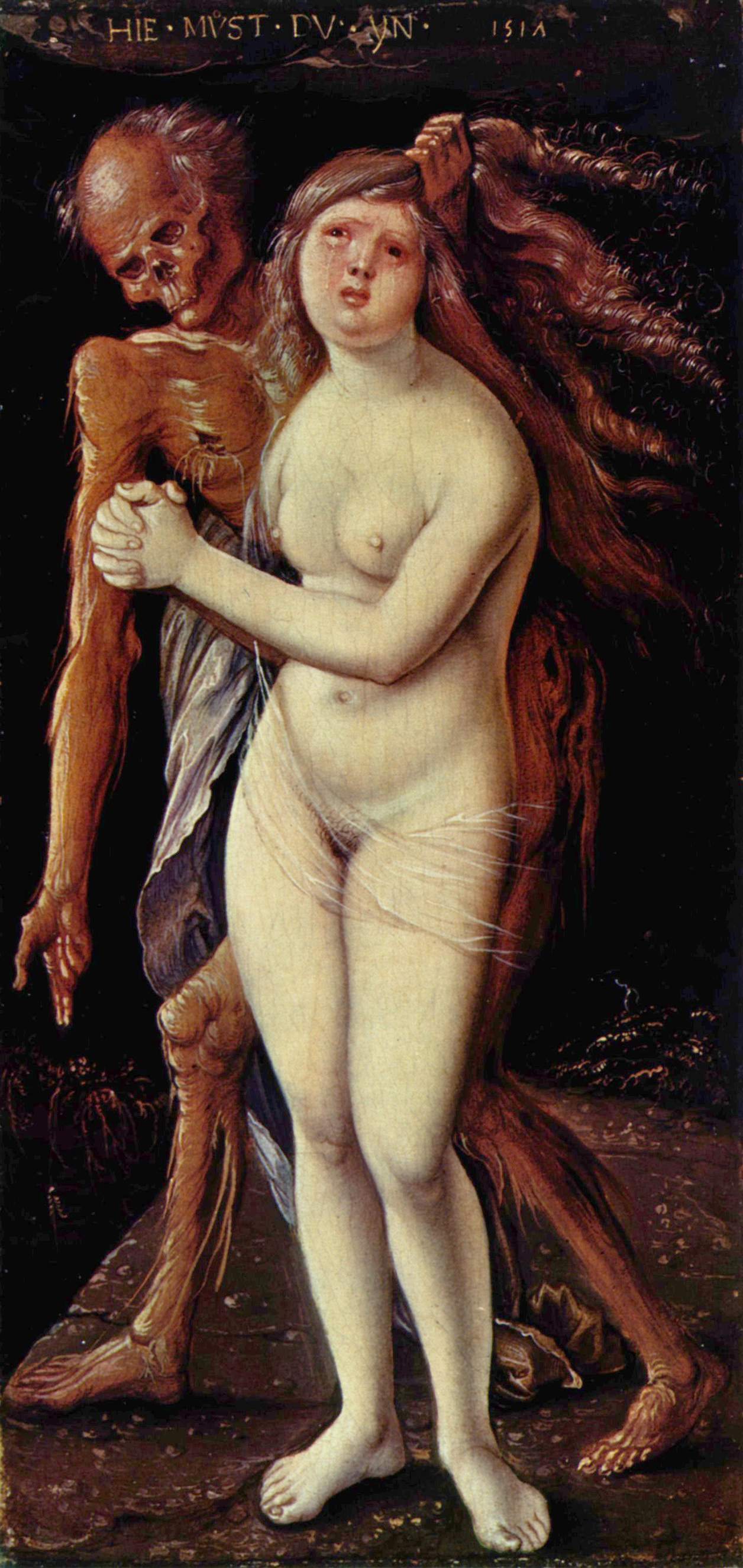
Der Tod und das Mädchen, Hans Baldung Grien, 1517

The quartet takes its name from the lied "Der Tod und das Mädchen", D 531, a setting of the poem of the same name by Matthias Claudius, that Schubert wrote in 1817. The theme of the song forms the basis of the second movement of the quartet. The theme is a death knell that accompanies the song about the terror and comfort of death.

German

Das Mädchen:
Vorüber! Ach, vorüber!
Geh, wilder Knochenmann!
Ich bin noch jung! Geh, Lieber,
Und rühre mich nicht an.
Und rühre mich nicht an.

Der Tod:
Gib deine Hand, du schön und zart Gebild!
Bin Freund, und komme nicht, zu strafen.
Sei gutes Muts! Ich bin nicht wild,
Sollst sanft in meinen Armen schlafen!

English

The Maiden:
Pass me by! Oh, pass me by!
Go, fierce man of bones!
I am still young! Go, dear,
And do not touch me.
And do not touch me.

Death:
Give me your hand, you beautiful and tender form!
I am a friend, and come not to punish.
Be of good cheer! I am not fierce,
Softly shall you sleep in my arms!

I. Allegro

II. Andante con moto

III. Scherzo: Allegro molto

IV. Presto
Yorkside Quartet (Kensho Watanabe and Kisho Watanabe, violins, Jonathan Bregman, viola, Scott McCreary, cello) recorded in performance at Yale University, 2008. View the performance at YouTube.

But it is not only this theme of the quartet that recalls death. The quote from the song "makes explicit the overriding theme of the work, its bleak vision and almost unremitting foreboding", writes Andrew Clements. From the violent opening unison, the first movement runs a relentless race through terror, pain and resignation, ending with a dying D minor chord. "The struggle with Death is the subject of the first movement, and the andante accordingly dwells on Death's words", writes Cobbett.

After a scherzo movement, with a trio that provides the only lyrical respite from the depressing mood of the piece, the quartet ends with a tarantella – the traditional dance to ward off madness and death. "The finale is most definitely in the character of a dance of death; ghastly visions whirl past in the inexorable uniform rhythm of the tarantella", writes Cobbett.

So strong is the association of death with the quartet that some analysts consider it to be programmatic, rather than absolute music. "The first movement of Schubert's Death and the Maiden string quartet can be interpreted in a quasi-programmatic fashion, even though it is usually viewed as an abstract work", writes Deborah Kessler. Theologian Frank Ruppert sees the quartet as a musical expression of Judaeo-Christian religious beliefs. "This quartet, like so many of Schubert's works, is a kind of para-liturgy", he writes. Each movement is about a different episode in the process of death and resurrection.

== Analysis ==
The quartet throughout is characterized by sudden dramatic shifts from fortissimo to pianissimo, from the lyrical to the compelling and dramatic. A driving undercurrent of triplets is a recurring motif in all four movements.

There are four movements:

1. Allegro, in D minor and common time (4/4)
2. Andante con moto, in G minor and cut time (2/2)
3. Scherzo: Allegro molto, in D minor - trio in D major and 3/4 time
4. Presto, in D minor and 6/8 time

=== I. Allegro ===
Opening of the quartet

In the 14-measure introduction, Schubert establishes the elements that will carry through the entire movement. The quartet begins with a unison D, played fortissimo, and a triplet figure, that establishes the triplet motif. Three and a half measures of fortissimo break off into a sudden, pianissimo chorale, the first of the many violent shifts of mood that occur throughout.

Main theme of the movement

After the introduction, Schubert presents the first theme: a continuation of the chorale motif, but with the triplet motif rippling through the lower voices, in a restless, unremitting stream.

Second theme

The triplet motif is transmuted into a connecting theme of its own, leading to the second theme in F major.

Second theme, with 16th notes accompaniment

The second theme is repeated, with an accompaniment of sixteenth notes.

End of the exposition

The sixteenth note passage modulates through a range of keys, finally settling on A major, where it continues as an accompaniment to a restatement of the second theme in the second violin. The exposition ends with a transformation of the second theme, this time wrenched into a violent outburst in A minor.

Development. The maiden remonstrates against Death, Death wheedles and cajoles

The development concentrates on the two forms of the second theme: the lilting, quiet version, and the violent inverted form. The section fluctuates between a fading relaxation and fortissimo. Toward the end of the development, Schubert reintroduces the triplet motif of the first theme, leading to the recapitulation.

End of the first movement. The maiden is close to death. Suddenly a spurt of life, hope, the music rushes and moves to major. But then, a return to minor, and the music pulses to its death

Here the opening themes return, with variants. The music moves to D major, for a relaxed recapitulation of the second theme, then returns to D minor. A chorale reminiscent of the introduction leads to the coda. But even in the chorale, the tension does not relax, with a sudden fortepiano interrupting the quiet. The opening theme returns, played at a rushed tempo, like a sudden resurgence of life, growing to a climax that suddenly breaks off and the triplet motif, played at the original slower tempo, dies away to the end of the movement.

=== II. Andante con moto ===
Theme of the second movement

The second movement is a theme and five variations, based on the theme from the Schubert Lied. The theme is like a death march in G minor, ending on a G-major chord. Throughout the movement, Schubert does not deviate from the basic harmonic and sentence structure of the 24-measure theme. But each variation expresses a profoundly different emotion.

First variation

In the first variation, a lilting violin descant floats above the theme, played in pulsing triplets in the second violin and viola that recall the triplets of the first movement.

Second variation

In the second variation, the cello carries the theme, with the first violin playing the pulsating role – this time in sixteenth notes.

Third variation

After two relaxed variations, the third variation returns to the Sturm und Drang character of the overall piece: a galloping fortissimo figure breaks off suddenly into piano; the violin plays a variant of the theme in a high register, while the inner voices continue the gallop.

Fourth variation

The fourth variation is again lyrical, with the second violin and cello carrying the melody under a long violin line in triplets. This is the only variation in a major key: G major.

Fifth variation

In the fifth variation, the second violin takes up the theme, while the first violin plays a sixteenth-note arpeggiated motif, with the cello playing the triplets in the bass. The variation grows from pianissimo to fortissimo, then again fades and slows in pace, finally returning to a restatement of the theme – this time in G major.

=== III. Scherzo: Allegro molto ===
Theme of the scherzo

Theme of the scherzo movement

The third movement is derived from the Ländler No. 6 in G-sharp Minor composed by Schubert. Cobbett describes the third movement as the "dance of the demon fiddler". There is indeed something demonic in this fast-paced scherzo, full of syncopations and, like the other movements, dramatic leaps from fortissimo to pianissimo.

Trio section of the scherzo

The scherzo is designed as a classical minuet: two strains in 3/4 time, repeated, in D minor, followed by a contrasting trio section in D major, at a slower tempo, and ending with a recapitulation of the opening strains. The trio section is the only real respite from the compelling pace of the whole quartet: a typically Schubertesque melody, with the first violin playing a dancing descant above the melody line in the lower voices, then the viola takes the melody as the first violin plays high eighth notes.

The scherzo is a short movement, serving as an interlude leading to the frenetic last movement.

=== IV. Presto ===
Theme of the fourth movement

The finale of the quartet is a tarantella in rondo-sonata form, in D minor. The tarantella is a breakneck Italian dance in 6/8 time, that, according to tradition, was a treatment for madness and convulsions brought on by the bite of a tarantula spider. Appropriately, Cobbett calls this movement "a dance of death".

The movement is built of sections. The first, main section recurs between each of the subsequent sections.

Theme of the last movement

The movement opens with the main section of the rondo in unison, with a theme based on a dotted figure. The theme is traditionally bowed in the reverse direction from the usual bowing of dotted passages. This has the effect of moving the accent onto the off-beat, giving the entire passage the character of a limping dance.

Second section: a chorale melody, with triplets accompanying

The theme develops characteristically, with sudden lurches from loud to soft and running triplets, leading to the second section of the rondo: a broad, chorale-like theme. Cobbett identifies this theme as a quote from another song of Schubert's, "Erlkönig", about a child who dies at the hands of king of the forest. The terrified child turns to his father for protection, but his father does not see the spirit, and ignores the child's pleas until the child is dead in his arms. "There is deep meaning in the appearance of this phrase", writes Cobbett. The chorale motif continues, with a flowing triplet accompaniment in the first violin that recalls the fourth variation of the Andante movement. This leads to a restatement of the main theme.

Third section: convoluted harmonies, offbeat rhythms

Here, the triplet motif of the opening of the quartet also reappears, in disguised form. Then the chorale theme recurs, leading to the second statement of the main section. The third section of the rondo begins. This is a complex, involuted section with chromatic swirls of triplets and hemiolas that cause the listener to lose all sense of downbeat. This leads into a recapitulation of the second section, and then a return of the main section of the rondo.

Coda of the last movement

A crescendo leads to the Prestissimo coda of the movement and of the piece. The coda begins in D major, suggesting a triumphant end – a device common in classical and romantic quartets. But in this case, the coda suddenly returns to D minor, for a tumultuous and tragic conclusion.

== Reception ==
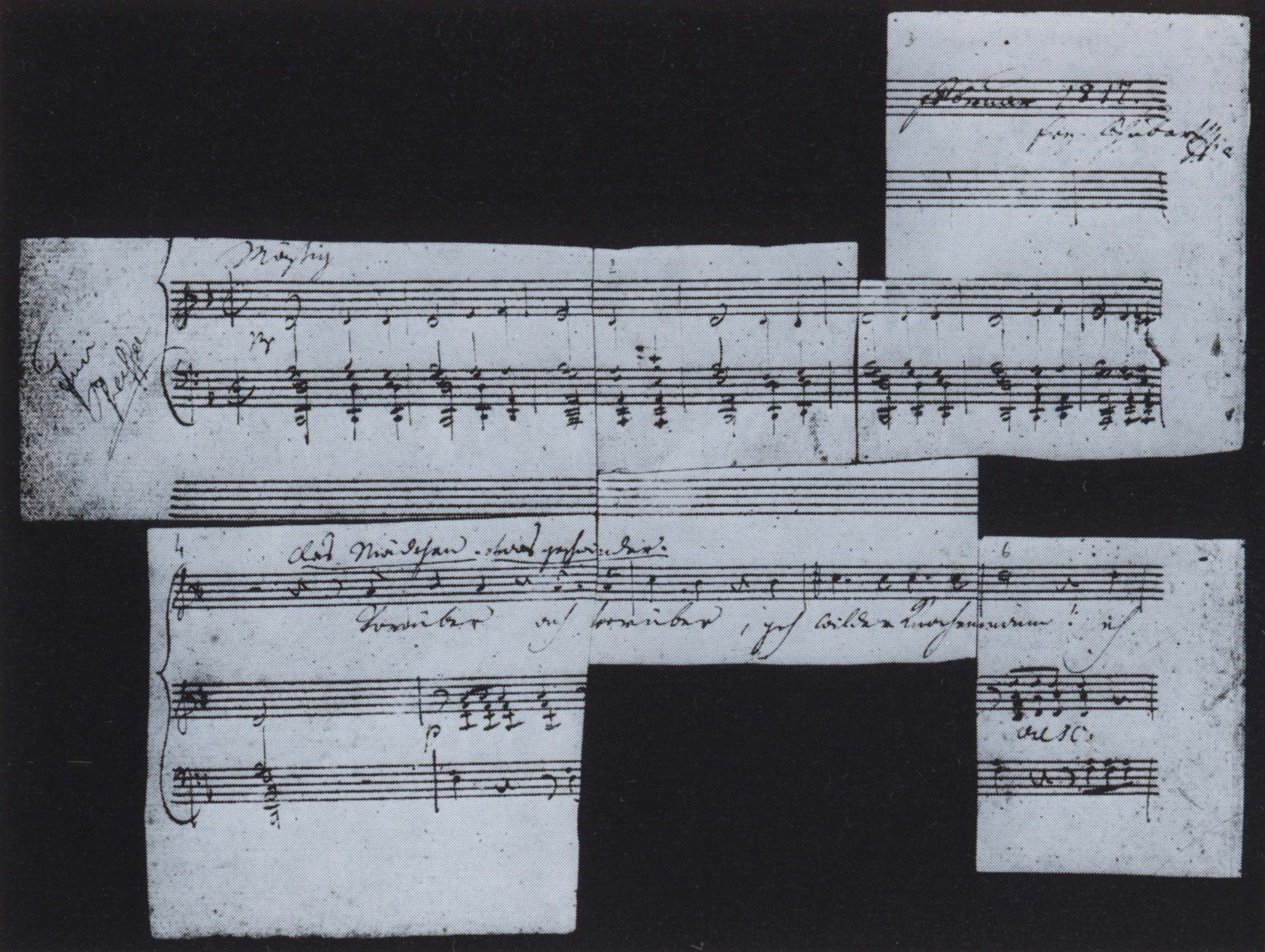
Original manuscript of Death and the Maiden lied

After the initial reading of the quartet in 1826, the quartet was played again at a house concert in the home of composer Franz Lachner, with violinist Ignaz Schuppanzigh leading. Schuppanzigh, one of the leading violinists of the time, who debuted many of Beethoven's and Schubert's quartets, was reportedly unimpressed. "Brother, this is nothing at all, let well alone: stick to your Lieder", the aging Schuppanzigh is reported to have said to Schubert.

Schuppanzigh's impressions notwithstanding, Schubert's quartet soon won a leading place on the concert stage and in the hearts of musicians. "Only the excellence of such a work as Schubert's D minor Quartet... can in any way console us for the early and grievous death of this first-born of Beethoven; in a few years he achieved and perfected things as no one before him", wrote Robert Schumann of the quartet.

In a testament to the work's enduring popularity, it has been the most played string quartet in Carnegie Hall history with 56 performances.

The quartet has been honored by several transcriptions. In 1847, Robert Franz transcribed it for piano duet, and in 1896 Mahler planned an arrangement for string orchestra and notated the details in a score of the quartet (the work was never completed, however, and only the second movement was written out and played; modern revivals of the arrangement are by David Matthews and Kenneth Woods).

In the 20th century, British composer John Foulds and American composer Andy Stein made versions for full symphony orchestra.

The US composer George Crumb incorporated the theme of the second movement into his string quartet Black Angels.

At Fridtjof Nansen's state funeral in 1930, Death and the Maiden was performed instead of speeches.

The quartet has also inspired other works. Ariel Dorfman's 1991 play Death and the Maiden, adapted for film in 1994 by Roman Polanski, is about a woman tortured and raped in a South American dictatorship, to the strains of the quartet. It has also appeared as incidental music in numerous films: The Portrait of a Lady (Jane Campion, 1996), What? (Roman Polanski, 1972), Sherlock Holmes and the Case of the Silk Stocking (BBC production, 2004), The House That Dripped Blood (1971) and in Samuel Beckett's radio play All That Fall (1962).
