= Piano Trio, Op. 97 (Beethoven) =

Piano trio by Ludwig van Beethoven

Piano Trio
- "Archduke Trio"
- by Ludwig van Beethoven
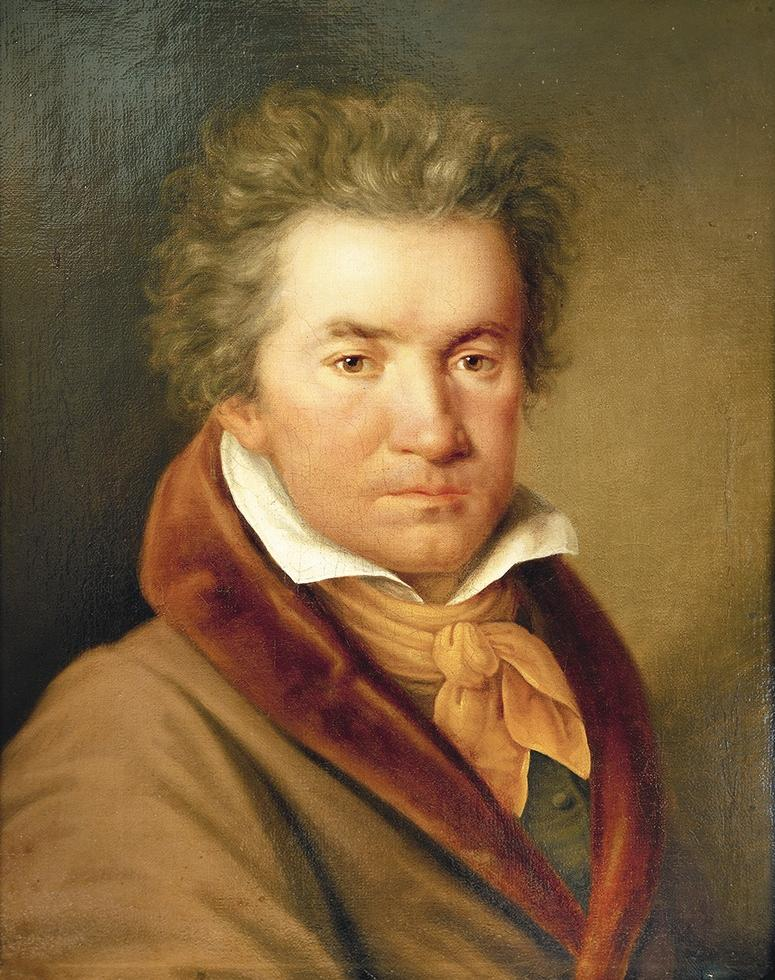
- Beethoven in 1815, portrait by Joseph Willibrord Mähler
- Key: B♭ major
- Opus: 97
- Composed: 1810–11
- Dedication: Archduke Rudolph of Austria
- Performed: 11 April 1814
- Movements: Four

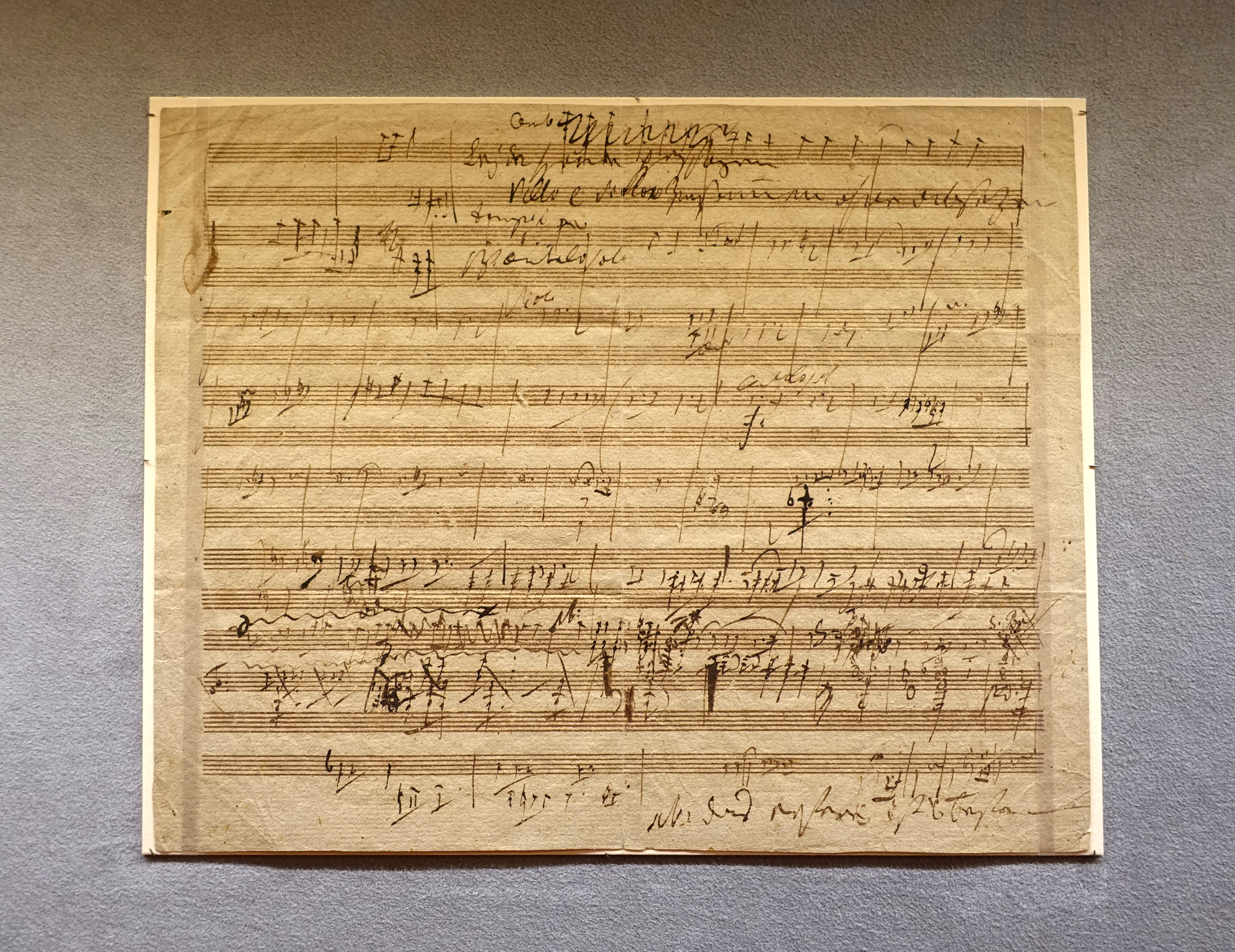
Sketches for the third and fourth movements of Piano Trio, op. 97, 1810–1811, musical autograph

The Piano Trio in B♭ major, Op. 97, by Ludwig van Beethoven is a piano trio completed in 1811. It is commonly referred to as the Archduke Trio, because it was dedicated to Archduke Rudolph of Austria, the youngest of twelve children of Leopold II, Holy Roman Emperor. Rudolf was an amateur pianist and a patron, friend, and composition student of Beethoven. Beethoven dedicated about a dozen compositions to him.

The Archduke Trio was written late in Beethoven's so-called "middle period". He sketched out the draft for it in the summer of 1810 and completed the composition in March 1811. It follows the traditional four movement structure with sonata form in the first and rondo sonata form in the last movement. It also allows for a more prominent part for the piano than previous compositions.

== History ==
The Archduke Trio came to fruition just months after a highly successful premiere of his Battle Symphony (Wellingtons Sieg, Op. 91). Though the relationship between Beethoven and Archduke Rudolf had its challenges, Beethoven was indebted to him for his unwavering financial support, on which account Beethoven continued to dedicate works to him. In this work, Beethoven increases the independence of the piano's role in relation to the violin and cello and in comparison with his earlier piano trios.

There is much debate over the amount of time Beethoven dedicated to composing the Archduke Trio, though an earlier autograph from March 1811 could prove that it was composed in only three weeks' time. At this time, Beethoven was experiencing great success with his compositions and pitting publishers against each other. He may have been considering marriage according to personal correspondence via letters. Beethoven also wrote personally to Archduke Rudolf with the newly composed trio to have it copied within the archduke's palace out of fear that it would be stolen. This was a frequent transaction between the two and resulted in the archduke establishing a library of all of Beethoven's compositions with manuscript copies for preservation.

== First performances ==
Two days after its completion in 1811, Beethoven played the Archduke Trio in an informal setting at the Baron Neuworth's residency. The first public performance was given by Beethoven himself, Ignaz Schuppanzigh (violin), and Josef Linke (cello) at the Viennese hotel Zum römischen Kaiser on April 11, 1814. At the time, Beethoven's deafness compromised his ability as a performer, and after a repeat performance a few weeks later, Beethoven never appeared again in public as a pianist.

The violinist and composer Louis Spohr witnessed a rehearsal of the work, and wrote, "on account of his deafness there was scarcely anything left of the virtuosity of the artist which had formerly been so greatly admired. In forte passages the poor deaf man pounded on the keys until the strings jangled, and in piano he played so softly that whole groups of notes were omitted, so that the music was unintelligible unless one could look into the pianoforte part. I was deeply saddened at so hard a fate."

The pianist and composer Ignaz Moscheles attended the premiere, and wrote about the work, "in the case of how many compositions is the word 'new' misapplied! But never in Beethoven's, and least of all in this, which again is full of originality. His playing, aside from its intellectual element, satisfied me less, being wanting in clarity and precision; but I observed many traces of the grand style of playing which I had long recognized in his compositions."

== Music ==
The work is in four movements:

1. Allegro moderato
2. Scherzo (Allegro)
3. Andante cantabile, ma però con moto
4. Allegro moderato

A typical performance runs more than 40 minutes in length.

=== I. Allegro moderato ===
This first movement is in the home key of B♭ major and is in Sonata form. The first two measures present a motif consisting of five notes which are used throughout the trio in various altered forms. The main theme remains piano until the coda where it returns at a fortissimo indication.

=== II. Scherzo (Allegro) ===
Also in the home key of B♭ major, the second movement consists of a fast scherzo and trio rather than the traditional slow movement. Some editions show the repeats of scherzo and trio sections, but Beethoven published it originally as written out repeats. The triad used as motivic material in the first movement is presented as scales here in the second.

=== III. Andante cantabile, ma però con moto ===
The third movement is in the key of D major and follows variation form and is approached attacca to the finale movement. There has been some debate over the specific tempo intended by Beethoven as to the authenticity of the inclusion of "con moto" in the score.

=== IV. Allegro moderato ===
This finale movement is in the home key of B♭ major and employs a loose interpretation of the Rondo Sonata form structure: A B A' B A' (Coda) The rhythmic similarities between all four movements culminates here, where Beethoven increasingly shortens the rhythmic values before bar lines. During the lengthy coda, there is a stray in key centers as far as A major and E♭ major until returning to B♭ major at the end. Beethoven himself indicated during a rehearsal of the piece that it should not be played in a gentle manner, but with much energy and force.

== Reception ==
Though there were complaints directed towards Beethoven after the public premiere regarding his abilities as a performer due to his increasing deafness, the trio itself enjoyed much success and was quickly considered as one of his masterpieces. His reputation and credibility as a composer did not diminish, but rather continued to soar. Music journals such as the Allgemeine Musikalische Zeitung viewed the trio as typical of the composer's output with nothing out of the ordinary. They considered the scherzo to be contrapuntal in nature, which speaks to what music textures were still acceptable for audiences at this time between the Classical and Romantic eras. Likewise, in 1823 the Allgemeine Musikalische Zeitung issued a call to musicians to perform the piece with much dedication and inspiration.

== References in popular culture ==
- The trio, referred to as The Archduke, plays a significant role in Elizabeth George's mystery A Traitor to Memory (2001)
- In Haruki Murakami's novel Kafka on the Shore (2002), the piece and its history are used to explain the relationship between two main characters, Nakata and Hoshino, and the latter's development as a person.
- In the Coen Brothers's film The Man Who Wasn't There (2001), the melancholic third movement of this work plays a central role, particularly in the climactic final scene in the electric chair.
- In Colm Toibin's Nora Webster the recording figures prominently in the title character's musical development as well as the foil (the album cover) for an internal examination of how her life might have been different
