= Leopold Jansa =

Czech violinist, composer and teacher (1795–1875)

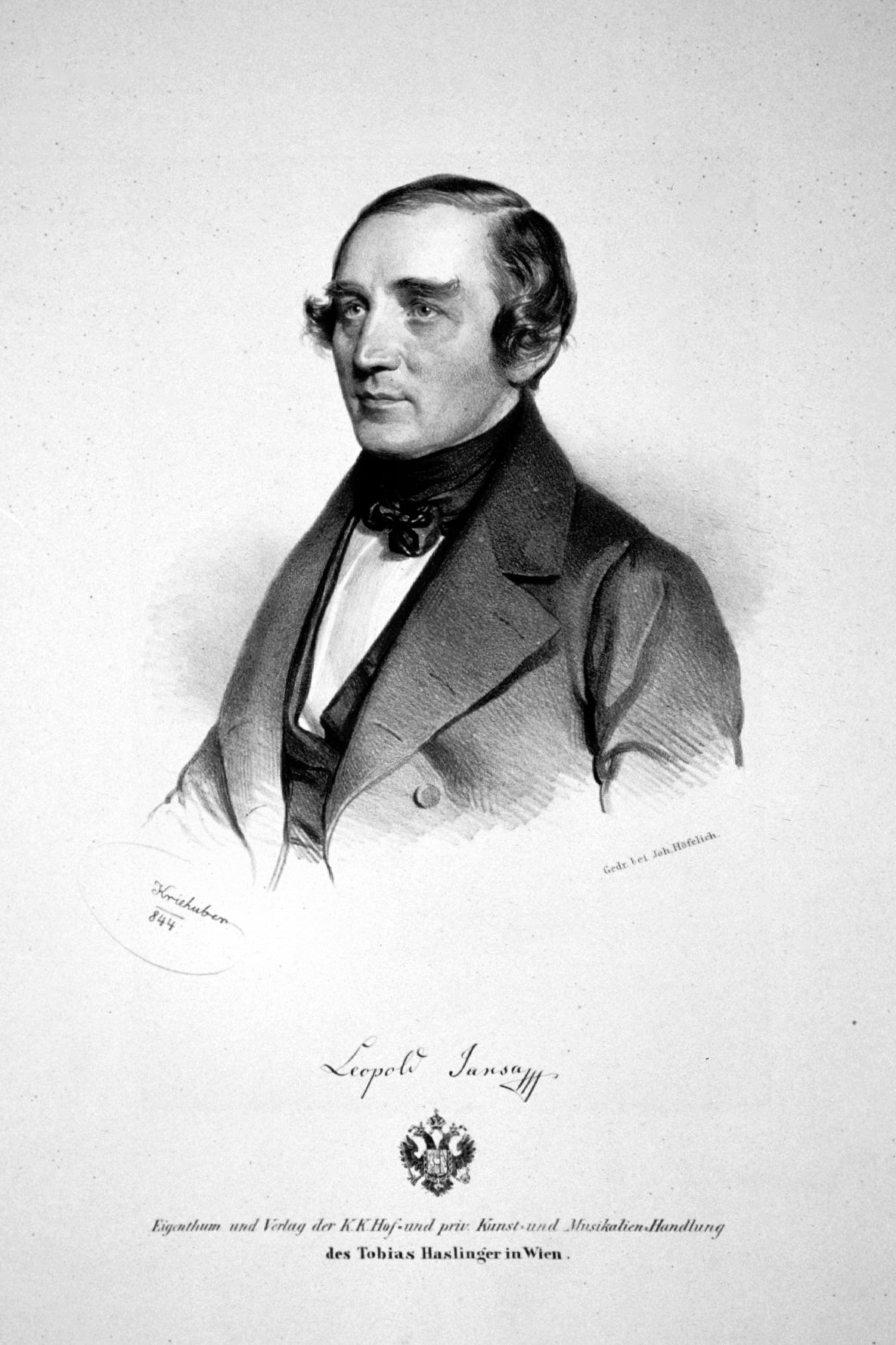

Leopold Jansa (23 March 1795 – 25 January 1875) was a Czech violinist, composer and teacher.

== Biography ==
He was born on 23 March 1795 in Ústí nad Orlicí, Habsburg monarchy (present day Czech Republic). He took violin lessons as a child in his hometown. He completed his education in Brno and came to Vienna to study law in 1817. However, he soon took up composition lessons with Jan Václav Voříšek and Emanuel Förster.

He was a member of the Braunschweig orchestra in 1823 and joined the Vienna Court Orchestra in 1824. In 1834, he became music director and professor at University of Vienna. From 1834 to 1850, he participated in various String quartets. He took over from Ignaz Schuppanzigh, with Karl Holz (second violin) and Joseph Linke (cello) from the Schuppanzigh Quartet, adding Karl Traugott Queisser (viola). From 1845 to 1848, he directed quartet soirées at the hall of the Gesellschaft der Musikfreunde. In 1847–48, he taught violin at the Vienna Conservatory.

He lost his positions in Vienna after participating in a London concert in favour of the Hungarian Revolution of 1848. He stayed in London as a music teacher until 1868, when he was amnestied and returned to Vienna. He resumed his previous duties in 1871 and died in Vienna on 25 January 1875, at the age of 79.

Among his students were Wilma Neruda, later known as Lady Hallé, and Karl Goldmark.

He composed chamber music and violin works.
