= Franz Weiss (violist) =

Austrian violist

Franz Weiss (18 January 1778 – 25 January 1830) was an Austrian violinist and viola player, and a composer. He is known particularly as a viola player in the Schuppanzigh Quartet, which was associated with the string quartets of Ludwig van Beethoven.

== Life ==
Weiss was born in Silesia in 1778; moving to Vienna, he became in the 1790s a viola player in an informal string quartet led by Ignaz Schuppanzigh, which played weekly for Prince Lichnowsky. He was later a member of Count Razumowsky's private string quartet, established in 1808 and led by Schuppanzigh. The quartet disbanded in 1815 and Schuppanzigh moved away from Vienna.

From 1819 to 1823 Weiss played viola in a string quartet assembled by Joseph Böhm. In 1823 Schuppanzigh returned and reformed his string quartet, Weiss again playing viola. The quartet gave the first performances of several of Beethoven's late string quartets.

Weiss was also well-known in Vienna as a violinist, and regularly held his own concerts, mostly of chamber music. He was a composer, his works including chamber music, piano sonatas, overtures and symphonies.
