= Joseph Böhm =

Hungarian violinist

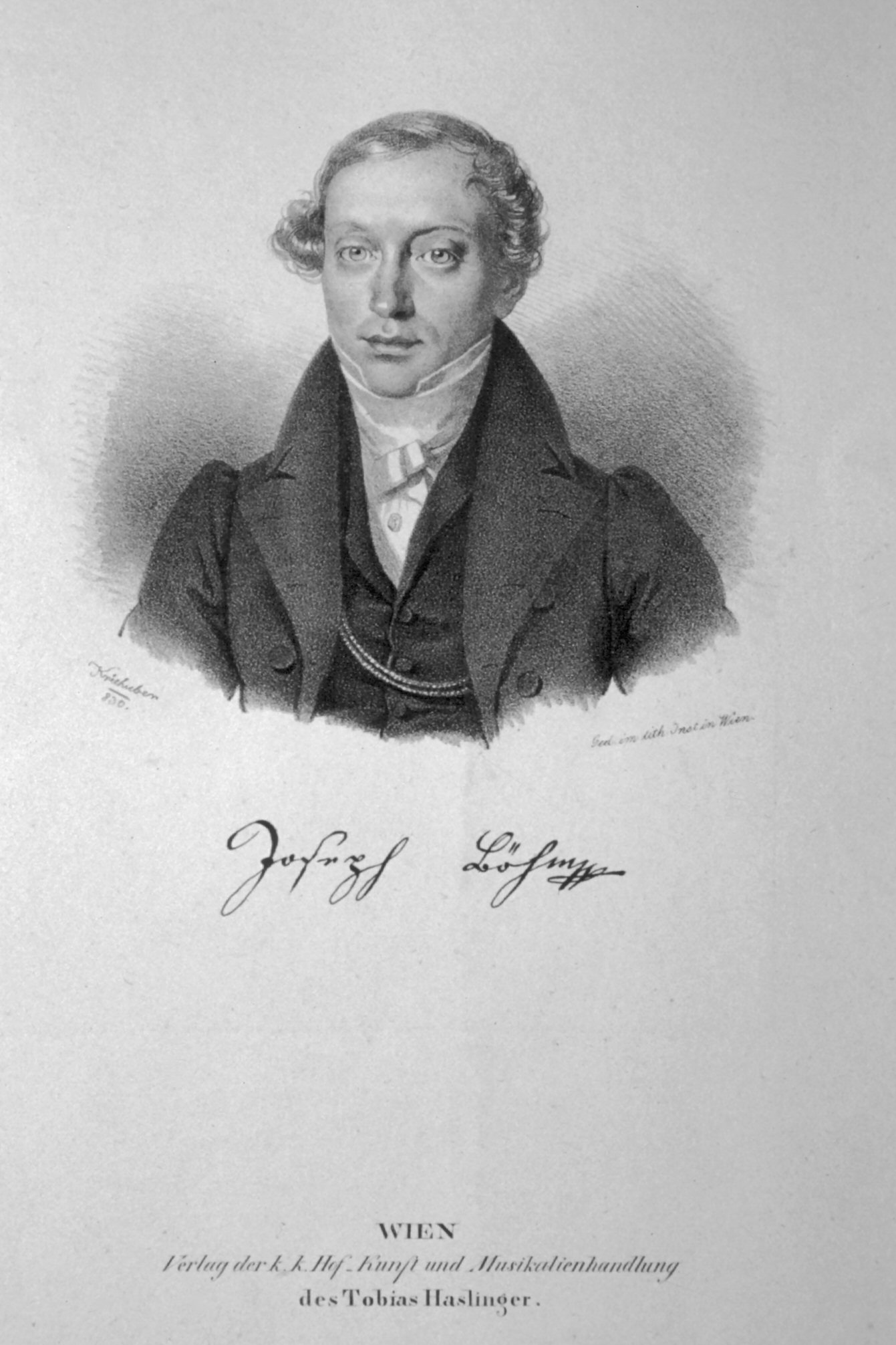
Lithograph of Böhm by Joseph Kriehuber

Joseph Böhm (Hungarian: Böhm József; 4 April 1795 – 28 March 1876) was a Hungarian violinist and a director of the Vienna Conservatory.

== Life ==
He was born in Pest, to a Jewish family. He was taught by his father and by Pierre Rode. His brother Franz Böhm (1788–1846), the maternal grandfather of the mathematician Georg Cantor, was also a well-known violinist and soloist in the Russian Empire.

He made his Vienna debut in 1816, playing works by Rodolphe Kreutzer and Franz Weiss.

He afterwards toured Italy, Germany, and France.

On 1 June 1819 he was appointed to be a professor at the Vienna Conservatory, the first violin professor there. He was professor from 1819 to 1848. His many students included Jenő Hubay, Joseph Joachim, Eduard Reményi, Heinrich Wilhelm Ernst, Jakob Dont, Georg Hellmesberger, Sr., Jakob Grün and Sigismund Bachrich.

He was quite involved in chamber music. In 1816, he arranged concerts dedicated to the string quartets of Ludwig van Beethoven, Joseph Haydn and Franz Schubert. He also collaborated with Carl Maria von Bocklet.

In 1821, he participated in a string quartet, consisting of fellow violinist Karl Holz, violist Franz Weiss, and cellist Joseph Linke.

He had a working relationship with Ludwig van Beethoven, being a member of the string quartet which premiered Beethoven's 12th String Quartet.

On 7 May 1824 he played in the orchestra for the premiere of Beethoven's Ninth Symphony.

He died in Vienna at the age of 80.
