= Carl Maria von Bocklet =

Czech composer, pianist and teacher

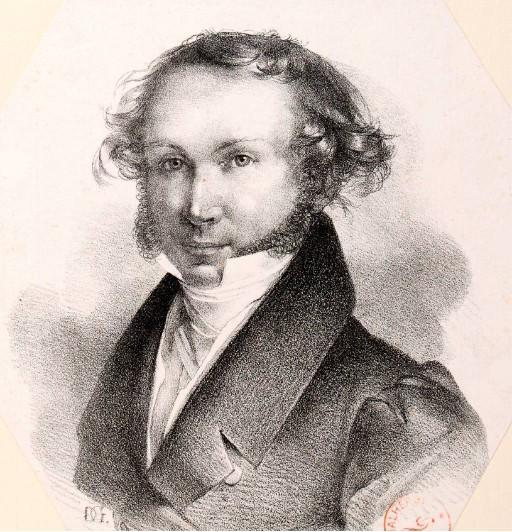

Carl Maria von Bocklet (30 November 1801 – 15 July 1881) was a composer, pianist and teacher of music.

Bocklet was born in Prague. He studied with Bedřich Diviš Weber and in 1821 he moved to Vienna, where he "created a great stir...through his interesting free fantasias on the piano forte." In Vienna, Eduard Marxsen was one of his notable students. (See: List of music students by teacher: A to B#Carl Maria von Bocklet.) Ludwig van Beethoven wrote letters of introduction for him, and he became a close friend of Franz Schubert; more than likely, he was influential to Frédéric Chopin. He was also admired by Franz Liszt as the two collaborated on concerts together.

In 1828 he was, with Ignaz Schuppanzigh and Joseph Linke, the first performer of Schubert's two piano trios (1827).

As Beethoven's letter of reference to Baron Nikolaus Zmeskall (1817?) testifies, von Bocklet was also a capable player of the violin.

Among his own compositions is a variation for Part II of Diabelli's Waltz of the Vaterländischer Künstlerverein.

Carl Maria von Bocklet died in Vienna, aged 79.
