= Anton Schindler =

Associate, secretary, and early biographer of Ludwig van Beethoven

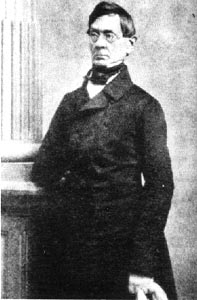

Anton Felix Schindler (13 June 1795 – 16 January 1864) was an Austrian law clerk and associate, secretary, and early biographer of Ludwig van Beethoven.

== Life ==
Schindler was born on 13 June 1795 in Medlov. He moved to Vienna in 1813 to study law, and from 1817 to 1822 was a clerk in a law office there. He was a competent, though not exceptional violinist, and played in various musical ensembles, first meeting Beethoven in 1814. He gave up his law career, becoming in 1822 first violinist at the Theater in der Josefstadt, and from 1825 first violinist at the Theater am Kärntnertor. His acquaintance with Beethoven continued, and from 1822, he lived in the composer's house, as his unpaid secretary.

Beethoven broke with Schindler in March 1825, and Karl Holz, a young violinist in the Schuppanzigh Quartet and friend of Beethoven, was engaged as the composer's secretary; though Schindler and Beethoven reconciled in August 1826, Holz continued as Beethoven's secretary with Schindler also tending to the composers' needs.

After Beethoven's death in 1827, Schindler moved to Budapest where he worked as a music teacher, returning to Vienna in 1829. In 1831, he moved to Münster where he was a musical director; from 1835 he lived in Aachen, where he was municipal music director until 1840. In 1840, Schindler's biography of Beethoven was published in Münster. Later editions appeared in 1845, 1860 and 1871.

In 1841–42 Schindler visited Paris, and met some of the famous musicians of the day.

Schindler possessed a great part of Beethoven's estate, in particular around 400 conversation books that Beethoven used to converse with friends in his later years. Beethoven's estate, purchased by the Royal Prussian Library in Berlin in 1845, included 136 conversation books. Schindler retained the remainder, which were likely destroyed.

Schindler died on 16 January 1864 in Bockenheim at the age of 68.

== Subsequent discredit and recent attempts at revival of credibility ==
Although inconsistencies in Schindler's account of Beethoven's life had been called in to question as early as the 1850s and had motivated Alexander Wheelock Thayer to commence research for his own pioneering Beethoven biography, it was a series of musicological articles published beginning in the 1970s that essentially destroyed Schindler's credibility. It was demonstrated that Schindler had falsified entries in Beethoven's conversation books, adding many spurious entries after the composer's death in 1827 and that he had exaggerated his period of close association with Beethoven (his claimed eleven or twelve years was likely no more than five or six). It is also believed that Schindler burned more than half of Beethoven's conversation books and removed countless pages from those that survived. The Beethoven Compendium (Cooper 1991, p. 52) goes so far as to say that Schindler's propensity for fabrication and inaccuracy was so great, virtually nothing he has written about Beethoven can be accepted as fact unless it is supported by other evidence. More recently, Theodore Albrecht has re-examined the question of Schindler's reliability, and as to his presumed destruction of a large number of conversation books, concludes that this widespread belief could possibly have been exaggerated.

Although Schindler forged documents and otherwise became notorious as an unreliable biographer and music historian, his accounts on Beethoven's style of performing his own piano works remain important sources. Dr. George Barth, in his book The Pianist as Orator (Ithaca, NY: Cornell University Press, 1992) brings to light an approach to bringing the Beethoven keyboard literature to life, based on Schindler and his testimonies, quite different from the Carl Czerny accounts on Beethoven the world has accepted since Schindler's forgeries compromised the latter's credibility. Discrepancies in metronome markings by Czerny as well as accounts of Beethoven's own rhythm and tempo choices create a worthier image of Schindler's credibility in that regard, and his valuable perspective on interpretation of Beethoven's piano music.

Nevertheless, most scholars and music historians dedicated to historical performances continue to discredit Schindler, especially in his appraisal of Beethoven's alleged flexibility in tempo when performing his own music, and instead continue to rely more on Czerny and Ferdinand Ries, both of whom were more accomplished musicians and knew Beethoven far longer than Schindler. This is summarized by Sandra Rosenblum in her Performance Practices in Classic Piano Music: Their Principles and Applications (Indiana University Press).

== In film ==
Anton Schindler plays a central role in the highly fictionalized Beethoven film biography Immortal Beloved, in which Schindler attempts to discover the identity of the Immortal Beloved, the mysterious intended recipient of Beethoven's famous love letter. Schindler is portrayed in the film by Dutch actor Jeroen Krabbé.

Anton Schindler's questionable treatment of Beethoven's conversation books is the theme of the film ベートーヴェン捏造 (Bētōben netsuzō - English Faking Beethoven) directed by Kazuaki Seki (2025).

== Works ==
- Anton Schindler (1840): Biographie von Ludwig van Beethoven. [Biography of Ludwig van Beethoven.] Münster. (2nd ed. 1845; 3rd ed. 1860; 5th ed. 1927.)
- Anton Felix Schindler (1996). Donald W. MacArdle (ed.). Beethoven as I knew him. Courier Dover Publications. ISBN 978-0-486-29232-8.
- Anton Felix Schindler, Ignaz Moscheles (eds), The life of Beethoven: including numerous characteristic traits and remarks on his musical works, Volumes 1-2, Gamut Music Co., 1966 (translation and republication)

== Sources ==
- Albrecht, Theodore: 'Anton Schindler as destroyer and forger of Beethoven’s conversation books: A case for decriminalization', Music's Intellectual History, RILM 2010, 168–81.
- Beck, Dagmar & Grita Herre (1979): "Anton Schindlers fingierte Eintragungen in den Konversationsheften." [Anton Schindler's Fabricated Entries in the Conversation Books.] In Harry Goldschmidt (ed.): Zu Beethoven. Aufsätze und Annotationen. [On Beethoven. Essays and Annotations.] Leipzig.
- Barry Cooper, gen. ed., The Beethoven Compendium, Ann Arbor, MI: Borders Press, 1991, ISBN 0-681-07558-9.
- Herre, Grita & Dagmar Beck (1978): "Einige Zweifel an der Überlieferung der Konversationshefte." [Some Doubts about the Conversation Books.] Bericht über den Internationalen Beethoven–Kongreß Berlin 1977. Leipzig.
- Howell, Standley (1979): "Beethoven's Mälzel Canon. Another Schindler Forgery?", The Musical Times Vol. 120, No. 1642, pp. 987–990. In German as "Der Mälzelkanon – eine weitere Fälschung Schindlers?", in: Harry Goldschmift (ed.): Zu Beethoven. Aufsätze und Dokumente, vol. 2. Berlin: Neue Musik 1984, pp. 163–171.
- William S. Newman, 'Yet Another Major Beethoven Forgery by Schindler?', The Journal of Musicology, Vol. 3, No. 4. (Autumn, 1984), pp. 397–422.
- Peter Stadlen, 'Schindler's Beethoven Forgeries', The Musical Times, Vol. 118, No. 1613. (July 1977), pp. 549–552.
- Tellenbach, Marie-Elisabeth: Beethoven and his "Immortal Beloved" Josephine Brunsvik. Her Fate and the Influence on Beethoven's Œuvre.
- Alexander Wheelock Thayer, Ludwig van Beethoven's Leben, 5 vols., Berlin 1866–1908 (vols. 4 and 5 posthumously ed. by Hugo Riemann).
