= Lulu von Thürheim =

Austrian painter and memoirist (1788–1864)

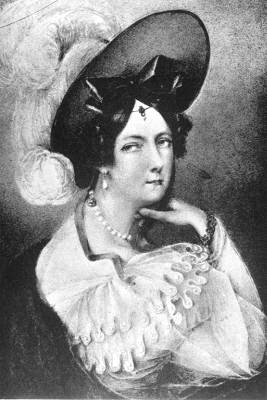
Countess Ludovika von Thürheim

Ludovika "Lulu" Franziska Maria, Countess von Thürheim (14 March 1788, in Tirlemont – 22 May 1864, in Döbling) was an Austrian painter, noblewoman and a memoirist.

== Biography ==
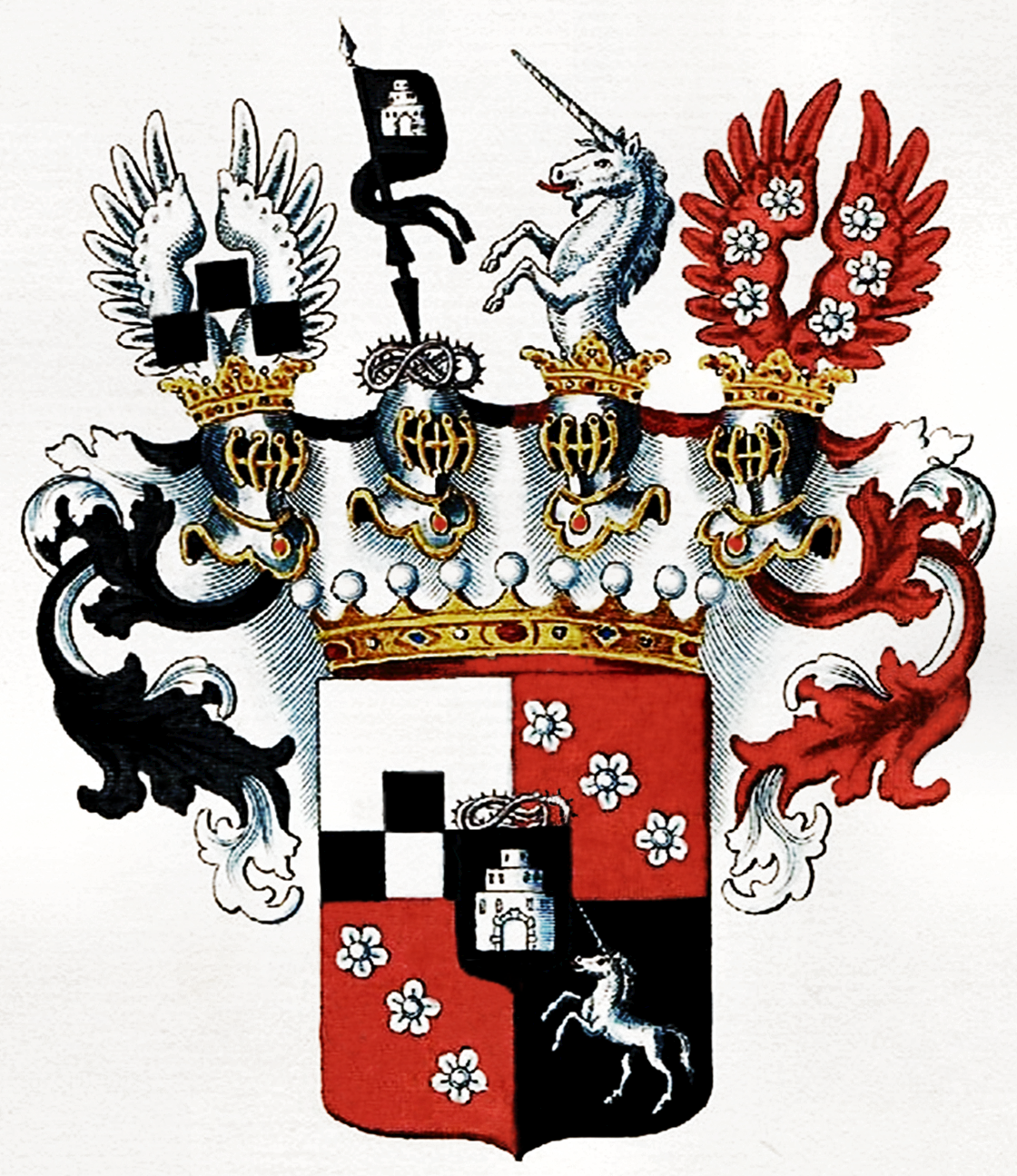
Coat of arms of the Counts von Türheim, (1835)

Ludovika Franziska Maria was born into the Türheim family, an uradel German noble family originating in Swabia. She was second daughter Josef Wenzel Count von Thürheim (1749–1808) and his wife, Countess Luise Berghe von Trips (1759–1812), sister-in-law of Louis, Landgrave of Hesse-Philippsthal. She is best remembered for her portraits, landscapes, and her memoirs of the Congress of Vienna which have served as important sources on cultural and social history of the Austrian Empire. She maintained close friendships with Prince Andrey Razumovsky, Prince Alexander Ypsilantis, Count Ioannis Kapodistrias, and Ludwig van Beethoven during her lifetime.

== Personal life ==
In 1832, she was married to Charles Thirion (1803–1832), secretary of Prince Razumovsky, who was 15 years younger than Lulu, but the marriage didn't last long, as he committed suicide, eight month later.
