= Medlov (Olomouc District) =

- Municipality
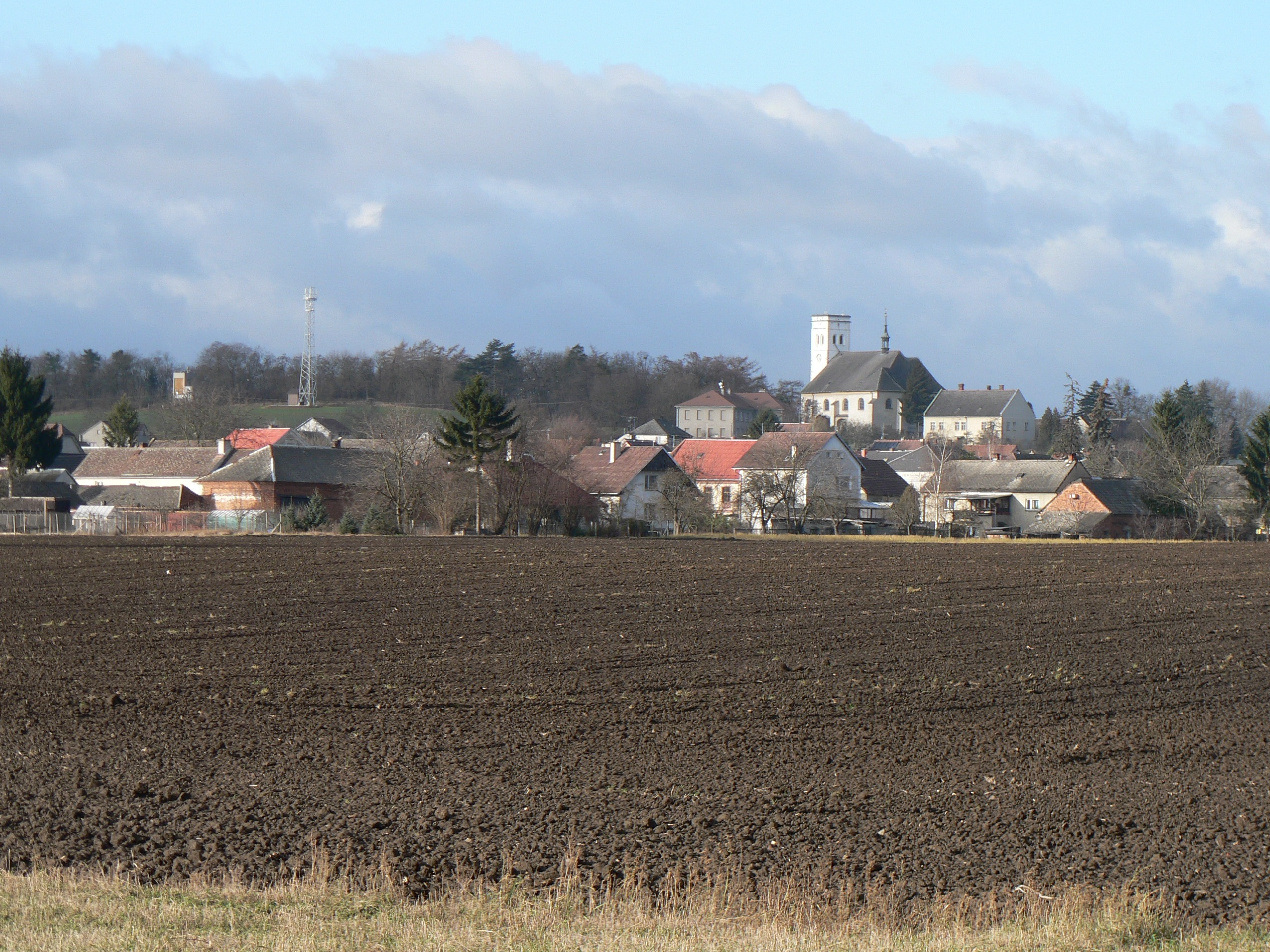
- View from the north

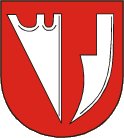
- Flag Coat of arms

- Location in the Czech Republic
- Coordinates: 49°47′15″N 17°3′46″E
- Country: Czech Republic
- Region: Olomouc
- District: Olomouc
- First mentioned: 1315

Area
  - Total: 31.29 km^{2} (12.08 sq mi)
- Elevation: 286 m (938 ft)

Population (2026-01-01)
  - Total: 1,673
  - Density: 53.47/km^{2} (138.5/sq mi)
- Time zone: UTC+1 (CET)
  - Summer (DST): UTC+2 (CEST)
- Postal code: 783 82
- Website: www.obecmedlov.cz

Medlov (German: Meedl) is a municipality and village in Olomouc District in the Olomouc Region of the Czech Republic. It has about 1,700 inhabitants.

Medlov lies approximately 26 kilometres (16 mi) north-west of Olomouc and 193 km (120 mi) east of Prague.

== Administrative division ==
Medlov consists of four municipal parts (in brackets population according to the 2021 census):

- Medlov (999)
- Hlivice (181)
- Králová (252)
- Zadní Újezd (141)

== Demographics ==
Historical population
Year	Pop.	±%
1869	2,261	—
1880	2,332	+3.1%
1890	2,413	+3.5%
1900	2,352	−2.5%
1910	2,436	+3.6%
1921	2,404	−1.3%
1930	2,433	+1.2%
1950	1,653	−32.1%
1961	1,761	+6.5%
1970	1,616	−8.2%
1980	1,515	−6.2%
1991	1,424	−6.0%
2001	1,525	+7.1%
2011	1,496	−1.9%
2021	1,573	+5.1%
Source: Censuses

== Notable people ==
- Anton Schindler (1795–1864), Austrian musician and music writer
