= Quartettsatz, D 703 (Schubert) =

Composition by Franz Schubert

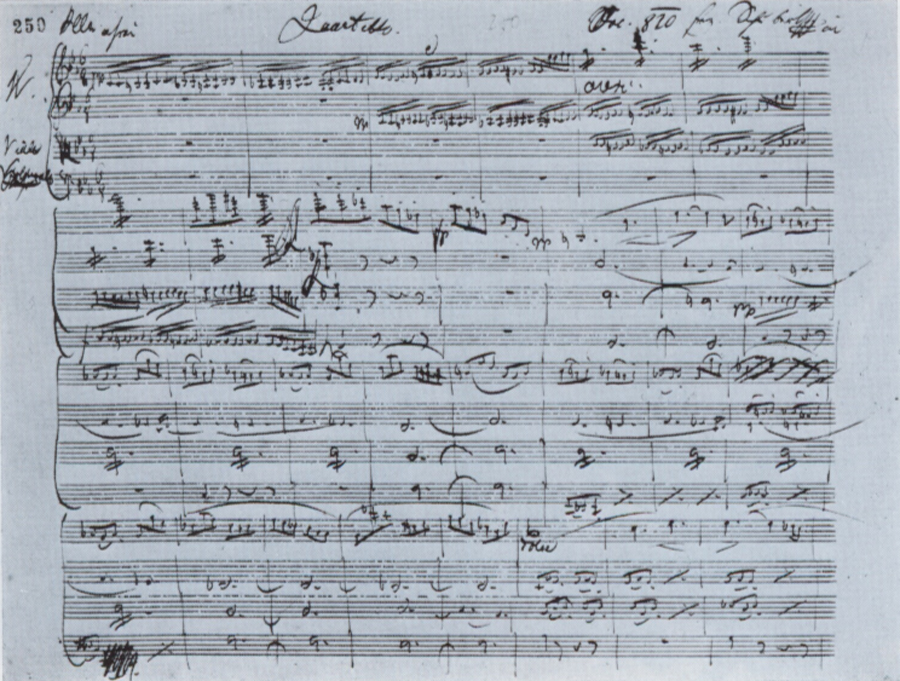
Page 1 of the manuscript

The Quartettsatz c-Moll (Quartet Movement in C minor) D 703 was composed by Franz Schubert in December 1820 as the first movement, Allegro assai, of a string quartet he was never to complete. Upon publication it was nonetheless listed as his "String Quartet No. 12". (Schubert did also compose the first 40 bars of the next movement, Andante.) The nine-minute work is regarded as an early product of the composer's mature phase of output.

== Background ==
Schubert began work on his twelfth string quartet in early December 1820, shortly after a "Schubertiade" held at the home of Ignaz von Sonnleithner on the first of the month. It was his first attempt at writing a string quartet since completing the String Quartet No. 11 in E major, D 353 in 1816.

After completing the allegro assai first movement, Schubert wrote out the 41 bar exposition of the following andante movement before abandoning the work.

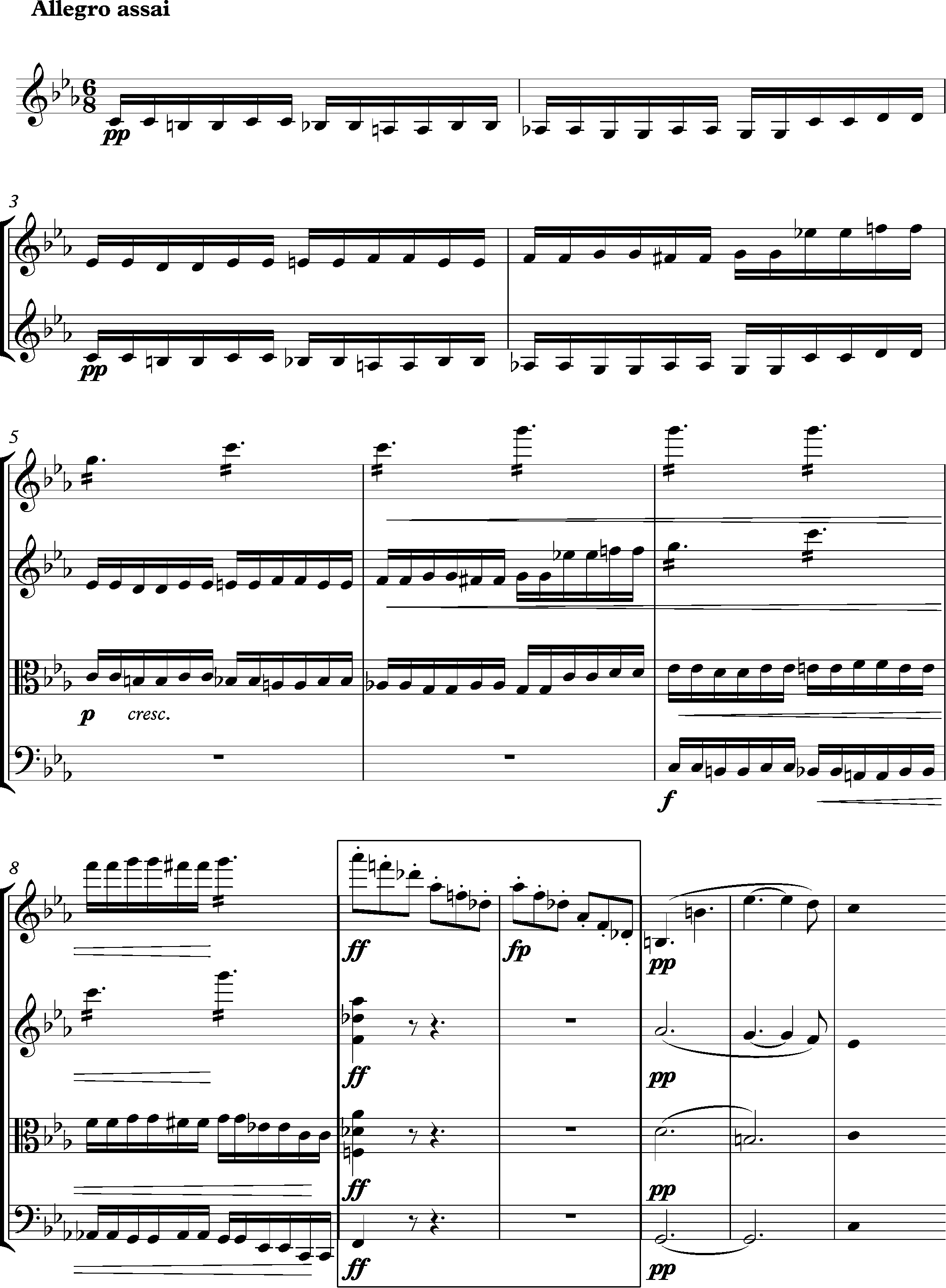
Opening bars Play

As with the later "Unfinished" Symphony, there has been much speculation on why Schubert left the composition incomplete. One view presented by Bernard Shore is that Schubert put it aside to follow up another musical idea and never got back to it. Javier Arrebola speculates that the work (like several others written during the same period) was put aside because it "...did not yet represent the great leap forward he was striving for". It has also been speculated that the work was abandoned because Schubert, having written a powerful first movement, was unable to come up with an effective following movement.

Following Schubert's death the manuscript score eventually found its way into the ownership of Johannes Brahms. Impressed by the Quartettsatz, Brahms arranged the posthumous premiere of the work on 1 March 1867 in Vienna, played by the Hellmesberger Quartet. Publication of the score, also edited by Brahms, followed in 1870.

For a number of years it was believed that the Quartettsatz was an early work dating to around 1814 (perhaps a confusion with the Quartettsatz in C minor D 103). In 1905, Edmondstoune Duncan wrote of the composition that it was "...fairly workman-like and effective, but is of little further consequence, and is only mentioned by way of completeness". Later opinion, such as Maurice Brown's comment that the quartet was "...the only movement in Schubert's instrumental work, prior to the 'Unfinished' Symphony, which prepares us for the greatness which bursts forth in that symphony," established the work's true importance as a forerunner of the late string quartets which are among Schubert's greatest works. Four years after the "Quartettsatz," Schubert returned to the genre to write the Rosamunde Quartet, D 804, which was followed by the "Death and the Maiden" Quartet D 810 and the Fifteenth Quartet, D 887.

== Structure ==
The composition consists of a single sonata form movement marked Allegro assai, and typical performances last nine minutes. However, the recapitulation of the exposition usually found in sonata form movements is modified in an unusual way, in that Schubert omits the recapitulation of the first theme, or principal subject, of the piece and begins the recapitulation with the second, lyrical theme. The principal subject only returns in the coda.

== Modern completion ==
In 2004 the Oregon String Quartet premiered Livingston Gearhart's 1990 completion of the Quartettsatz and the Andante.

The Brentano String Quartet performed the Quartettsatz as part of their Fragments Project in 2012; for this concert series the composition was paired with a work entitled Fra(nz)g-mentation by composer Bruce Adolphe that was based on Schubert's Andante sketches.
