= Schuppanzigh Quartet =

Viennese string quartet

The Schuppanzigh Quartet was a string quartet formed in Vienna in the 1790s by the violinist Ignaz Schuppanzigh. It continued, with breaks and changes of membership, for many years. Schuppanzigh was a close friend and admirer of Ludwig van Beethoven, and the quartet gave the first performances of many of Beethoven's string quartets.

== Origins ==
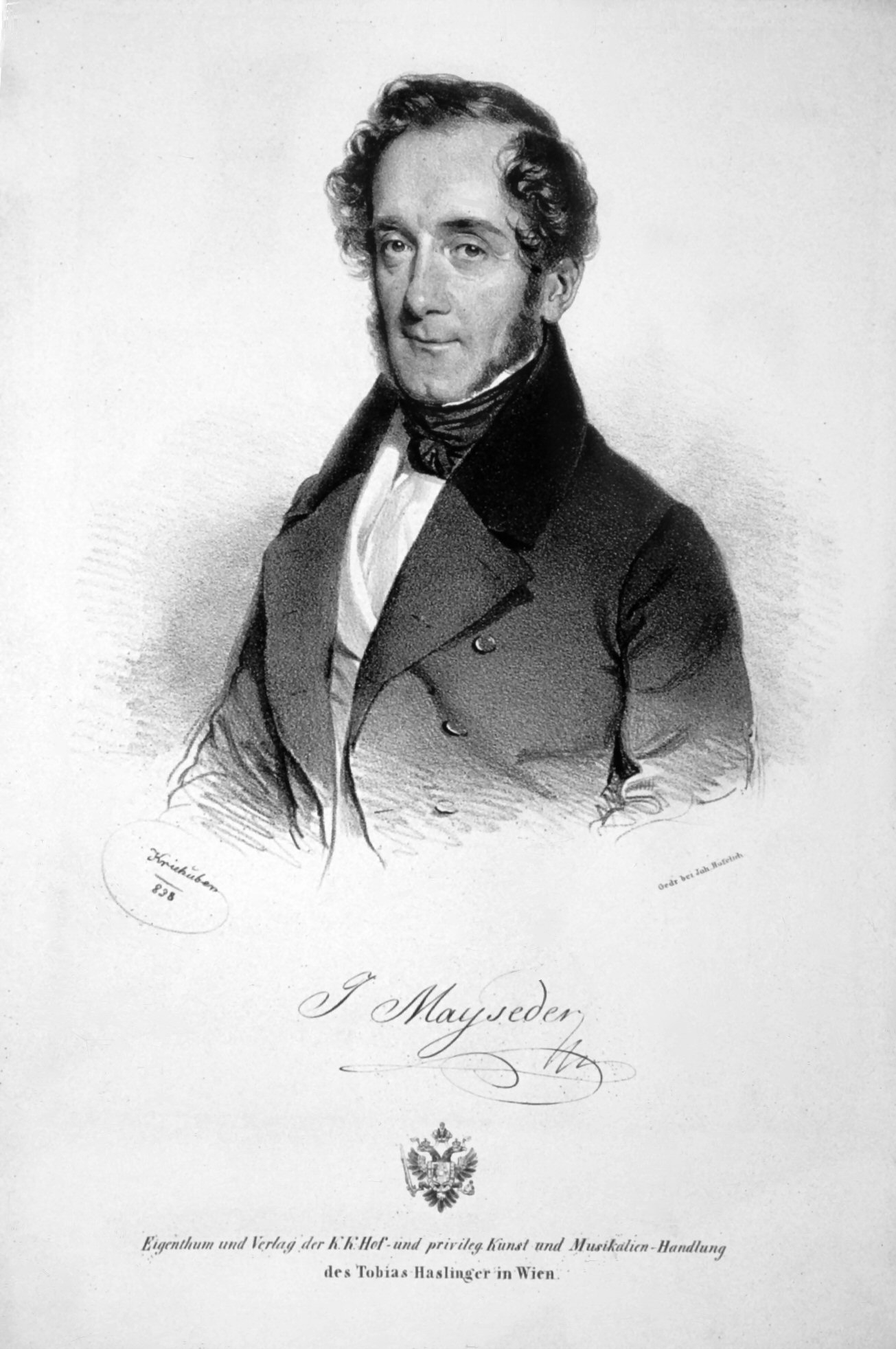
Joseph Mayseder (Lithographie by Josef Kriehuber, 1838)

Ignaz Schuppanzigh assembled an informal string quartet for Prince Lichnowsky in 1795. Its membership varied; the more regular players, all aged under 20, were Louis Sina playing second violin, Franz Weiss playing viola and Nikolaus Kraft playing cello. Beethoven's first set of string quartets, Op. 18, which were completed in 1800, were first performed by Schuppanzigh's quartet.

In 1805 Schuppanzigh formed his own quartet; the other players were Joseph Mayseder (second violin), Anton Schreiber (viola) and Antonín Kraft, the father of Nikolaus Kraft (cello). Their first concerts took place in Heiligenkreutzerhof, a private house; later in the restaurant Römischer Kaiser.

== Count Razumovsky's quartet ==
In 1808, Count Andrey Razumovsky, who was an amateur musician and enjoyed gathering musicians in his palace to play chamber music, commissioned Schuppanzigh to assemble a new string quartet. This was a permanent arrangement, the members being given lifelong contracts. Louis Sina played second violin, Franz Weiss played viola and Joseph Linke played cello.

In December 1808, Johann Friedrich Reichardt, a composer and writer on music, attended one of Razumovsky's concerts. He wrote:

This quartet was on the whole very well put together... Herr Schuppanzigh has an individual piquant way of playing which is very suitable to the humorous quartets of Haydn, Mozart and Beethoven... He executes with clarity, though not always absolutely cleanly, the difficult passages, which the local virtuosi seem to avoid altogether. He also accents very correctly and significantly. His cantabile is often truly singing and moving. He also leads his well-picked colleagues skilfully and truly in the spirit of the composer.

== Later years ==
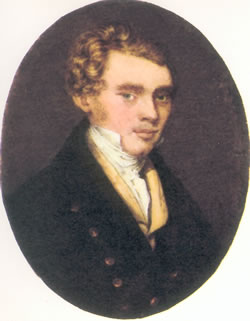
Karl Holz

On New Year's Eve 1815, a fire destroyed the Razumovsky's palace and Schuppanzigh's quartet was disbanded. Schuppanzigh left Vienna, and for several years was based in St. Petersburg while making concert tours of Poland and Prussia. He returned to Vienna in 1823 and reformed his string quartet; Karl Holz became second violinist, and the other members were as before. They gave concerts which were open to the public on subscription; it was unusual during this period to give concerts of music for string quartet.

In 1824, Beethoven, who had not written a string quartet since his Op. 95 in 1810, composed his String Quartet Op. 127, to a commission by Russian aristocrat Nikolai Borisovich Galitzin. The following year Schuppanzigh's quartet gave the first performance of this work; Beethoven was not pleased with the performance, for which he blamed Schuppanzigh, but the quartet later performed the two other string quartets commissioned by Galitzin: String Quartet Op. 130 and String Quartet Op. 132. They also gave the first performance of Schubert's A minor Quartet (D. 804)

== After Schuppanzigh ==
After Schuppanzigh's death in 1830, the violinist and composer Leopold Jansa formed a string quartet: it included Karl Holz and Joseph Linke. It performed, with breaks and changes to its membership, until 1849, when Jansa moved to London; the quartet was then led by Joseph Hellmesberger and was called the Hellmesberger Quartet. Joseph Mayseder, a member of Schuppanzigh's quartet in its early years, formed his own quartet in 1817, which performed until 1860.
