= Nikolai Borisovich Galitzin =

Russian aristocrat

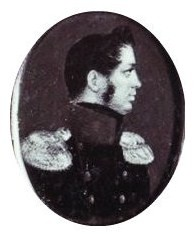
Nikolai Borisovich Galitzine

Prince Nikolai Borisovich Galitzin (Russian: Николай Борисович Голицын, alternatively transcribed Golitsyn, Golitsïn or Golitsin; 8 December/19 December 1794 – 22 October/3 November 1866) was a Russian aristocrat of the Galitzin family and a military officer. He was a military historian, an amateur musician, and is known particularly for his commissioning three string quartets — Opp. 127, 130, and 132 (Nos. 12, 13, & 15 respectively) — from Ludwig van Beethoven, which are among the composer's group of late string quartets.

== Family ==
His parents were Boris Andreevich Galitzin and his wife Ana, and one of his sisters was the philanthropist Tatiana Potemkina. He graduated from the page corps in 1810 and became an officer of the Russian Army (Kiev Dragoon Regiment), joining his father and two brothers: Alexander and Andrey (in the Life Guards Horse regiment). He participated in July 1812, including the battles of Smolensk, Borodino, Tarutino, Vyazma, and the capture of Paris.

His son Yuri Nikolaevich Galitzin (1823–1872) was a composer and conductor.

== Beethoven's commission ==
The prince had lived for a while in Vienna and knew the music of Haydn, Mozart, and Beethoven. He played the cello; his wife was an accomplished pianist. He arranged piano works of Beethoven for string quartet and string quintet.

In November 1822 he commissioned Beethoven to write string quartets. He wrote in French from Saint Petersburg to the composer:

Being as passionate an amateur as an admirer of your talent, I am taking the liberty of writing to you to ask you if you would be willing to compose one, two or three new quartets. I shall be delighted to pay you for the trouble whatever amount you would deem adequate.

Beethoven agreed to this, requesting 50 ducats for each quartet.

He had not written a string quartet since his Op. 95 in 1810. In 1823 he was occupied with writing his Ninth Symphony, and he began serious work on the quartets in 1824. The first of these, the String Quartet No. 12 in E-flat major, Op. 127, was given its first performance by the Schuppanzigh Quartet in March 1825. The quartet later performed the other two works commissioned, the String Quartet No. 13 in B-flat major, Op. 130 and String Quartet No. 15 in A minor, Op. 132.

Beethoven received the fee for the first quartet; although the prince acknowledged his debt for the other quartets, it was not paid in the composer's lifetime, the matter being finally settled with Beethoven's heirs in 1852.

=== Other associations with Beethoven ===
The prince was an intermediary in the sale of a copy of Beethoven's choral work Missa solemnis to the Russian court; it was through him that the first performance of the work took place in St Petersburg in April 1824.

Beethoven's overture The Consecration of the House, published in 1825, was dedicated to the prince.
