= Late string quartets (Beethoven) =

Group of compositions by Ludwig van Beethoven

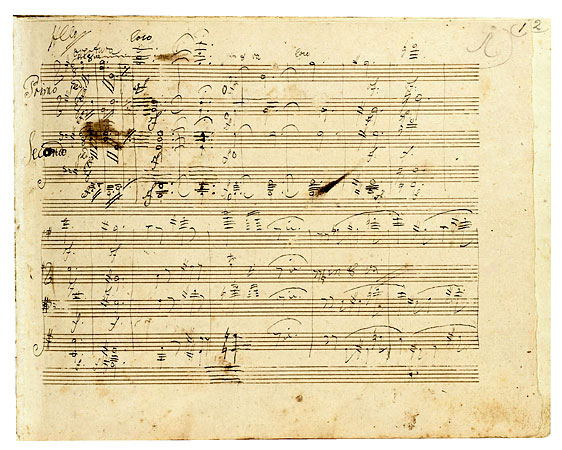
Manuscript of Beethoven's Große Fuge, arranged for piano four hands

Ludwig van Beethoven's late string quartets are:

- Opus 127: String Quartet No. 12 in E♭ major (1825)
- Opus 130: String Quartet No. 13 in B♭ major (1825)
- Opus 131: String Quartet No. 14 in C♯ minor (1826)
- Opus 132: String Quartet No. 15 in A minor (1825)
- Opus 133: Große Fuge in B♭ major (1825; originally the finale to Op. 130; it also exists in a piano four-hands transcription, Op. 134)
- Opus 135: String Quartet No. 16 in F major (1826)

These six works are Beethoven's last major completed compositions. Extremely complex and largely misunderstood by musicians and audiences of Beethoven's day, the late quartets are now widely considered to be among the greatest musical compositions of all time, and have inspired many later composers.

== Overview ==
Prince Nikolai Galitzin commissioned the first three quartets (12, 13, and 15), and in a letter dated 9 November 1822, offered to pay Beethoven "what you think proper" for them. Beethoven replied on 25 January 1823 with his price of 50 ducats for each opus. He composed the quartets in the sequence 12, 15, 13, 14, 16, writing 13 and 15 simultaneously.

Beethoven wrote these last quartets in failing health. In April 1825, he was bedridden and remained ill for about a month. His recovery from the illness inspired the modal slow movement of the Fifteenth Quartet, which Beethoven called "Holy song of thanks (Heiliger Dankgesang) to the divinity, from one made well". He went on to complete the quartets now numbered Thirteenth, Fourteenth, and Sixteenth. The last work Beethoven completed was the substitute final movement of the thirteenth quartet, which replaced the extremely difficult Große Fuge.

== The "ABC" quartets ==
Opp. 132, 130 and 131 are sometimes called the "ABC" quartets because of their keys: A minor, B♭ major, and C♯ minor. They are thematically linked by the four notes of the harmonic minor scale's second tetrachord. In his notes for the Quartetto Italiano's recording of all six quartets, A. David Hogarth writes:

What obviously intrigued Beethoven was the wide interval of a tone and a half between notes 2 and 3 [of example A]. In different permutations, the four notes play an important role in all three quartets and each work has a distinctive motto which also appears in companion works. The opening motto of op. 132, which ultimately reappears in op. 131's finale, consists of the first four notes of the opening bars (see example B).

The subject of the "Grosse Fuge” finale of the B-flat major, op. 130 follows the same pattern with the rising sixth between notes 1 and 3 increased from minor to major (see example C).

Op. 131, the masterwork of the three, opens with a fugue and the subject's opening phrase (transposed) is as example D. (As such this motto is already predicted in the trio of op. 132's second movement.) The key notes from which these mottoes are built finally appear thematically in their original scale form in the finale of op. 131.

Beethoven's sketchbooks prove clearly that these permutations were not coincidental. Even if they were there would be other coincidences to explain – the ABC sequence of keys, for instance, and the fact that the quartets have successively five, six, and seven movements.)

It could be argued that op. 131 is a six-movement work for the third "movement" is only 10 bars long and has the same A major key signature as its successor. Some critics, notably Vincent d'Indy, regard it simply as an introduction. But the tonality of the 10 bars is clearly B minor and if we note the tonal centres of the first four movements we get the familiar pattern of op. 132 and the "Grosse Fuge" (see example E). The keys of the remaining movements complete a cyclic progression back to C-sharp minor.

Beethoven's "obsession at that time with the upper four notes of the harmonic minor scale" (Hogarth) predates these works. For an early example, see the first movement of his string trio, opus 9, no. 3.

== Appraisal ==
Beethoven's late quartets went far beyond the comprehension of musicians and audiences of his time. One musician said, "we know there is something there, but we do not know what it is." Composer Louis Spohr called them "indecipherable, uncorrected horrors".

Opinion has changed considerably from the time of their first bewildered reception: these six quartets (including the Große Fuge) are widely considered to be among the greatest musical compositions of all time. The Frankfurt School philosopher Theodor W. Adorno, in particular, thought highly of them, and Igor Stravinsky called the Große Fuge "an absolutely contemporary piece of music that will be contemporary forever". Their forms and ideas inspired and continue to inspire musicians and composers, such as Felix Mendelssohn, Richard Wagner and Béla Bartók. Wagner said that Op. 131's first movement "reveals the most melancholy sentiment expressed in music". Schubert's last musical wish was to hear Op. 131, which he did on 14 November 1828, five days before his death. Afterward, he remarked, "After this, what is left for us to write?" Beethoven considered Op. 131 his single most perfect work.

== Other versions ==
Arturo Toscanini and Felix Weingartner, among others, transcribed some of the late quartets for string orchestra.

== Recordings ==
Ensembles that have recorded the complete late Beethoven quartets include:

- Alban Berg Quartett, EMI (studio early 80s)
- Alban Berg Quartet, EMI (rec. live 1989)
- Alexander String Quartet, Arte Nova
- Alexander String Quartet, Foghorn Classics
- Amadeus Quartet, DG
- Artemis Quartet, Virgin Classics
- Barylli Quartet
- Beethoven Quartet, Melodiya (rec. 1951–1972)
- Belcea Quartet
- Borodin Quartet, Chandos
- Brentano String Quartet, Aeon (rec. 2012)
- Budapest String Quartet, Bridge (rec. 1941–1960)
- Budapest String Quartet, Sony (rec. 1958–1961)
- Busch Quartet, various labels (rec. 1933–1941; no Große Fuge)
- Calidore Quartet, Signum (rec. 2022-2023)
- Cleveland Quartet, RCA Red seal (1970s)
- Cleveland Quartet, Telarc (1990s)
- Colorado Quartet, Parnassus (rec. 2004–2006)
- Dover Quartet, Cedille
- Ehnes Quartet, Onyx Classics (2020–2022)
- Ébène Quartet, Erato (2020)
- Emerson String Quartet, DG
- Endellion Quartet, Warner Classics (2005–2006)
- Fine Arts Quartet, Everest/Concert-Disc (rec. 1960–1965)
- Gewandhaus-Quartett, New Classical Adventure (rec. live 1985–1998)
- Guarneri Quartet, RCA Red Seal, Philips
- Hagen Quartett, DG
- Hollywood String Quartet, Testament
- Hungarian Quartet, (1953 mono) EMI
- Hungarian Quartet, (1960s stereo) EMI
- Juilliard String Quartet, CBS studio late 1960s
- Juilliard String Quartet, CBS (rec. live 1982)
- Kodály Quartet, Naxos
- LaSalle Quartet, DG (reissued on Brilliant Classics)
- Leipziger Streichquartett, MDG
- Lindsays, ASV
- Lydian String Quartet, Centaur
- Medici String Quartet, Nimbus
- Melos Quartett, DG
- Orford String Quartet, Delos
- Orion String Quartet, Koch Classics (2008)
- Penderecki String Quartet, Marquis (2013)
- Petersen Quartett, Capriccio
- Pražák Quartet, Praga
- Quatuor Mosaïques, Naïve
- Quartetto Italiano, Decca
- Smetana Quartet, Supraphon
- Suske Quartett, Berlin Classics
- Takács Quartet, Decca (2005)
- Talich Quartet, Calliope
- Taneyev Quartet, Boheme
- Tokyo String Quartet, RCA Red Seal (1993)
- Tokyo String Quartet, Harmonia Mundi (2010)
- Vanbrugh Quartet, Intim Musik (1996)
- Vermeer Quartet, Teldec, (rec. 1984–1989)
- Végh Quartet, (1952 Les Discophiles Français) Music & Arts
- Végh Quartet, (1972 Telefunken) Naïve-Astrée
- Wihan Quartet, Nimbus
- Yale Quartet, Vanguard

== See also ==
- List of compositions by Ludwig van Beethoven
- String Quartets Nos. 1–6, Op. 18
- String Quartets Nos. 7–9, Op. 59 – Rasumovsky
- A Late Quartet
