= String Quartet No. 13 (Schubert) =

1824 composition by Franz Schubert

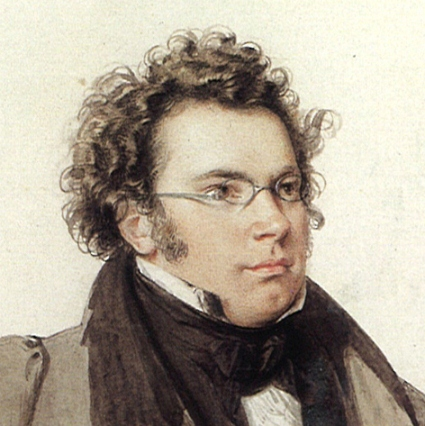
Schubert in 1825

The String Quartet No. 13 in A minor (the Rosamunde Quartet), D 804, Op. 29, was written by Franz Schubert between February and March 1824. It dates roughly to the same time as his monumental Death and the Maiden Quartet, emerging around three years after his previous attempt to write for the string quartet genre, the Quartettsatz, D 703, that he never finished.

== History ==
Starting in 1824, Schubert largely turned away from the composition of songs to concentrate on instrumental chamber music. In addition to the A-minor String Quartet, the Quartet in D minor, the Octet, the Grand Duo and Divertissement a la Hongroise (both for piano duet), and the Sonata for Arpeggione and Piano all date from that year. With the exception of the Grand Duo, all of these works display cyclic elements—that is, two or more movements in each work are deliberately related in some way to enhance the sense of unity. In the case of the A-minor Quartet, a motive from the third-movement Minuet becomes the most important melodic figure for the following finale.

Schubert dedicated the work to Schuppanzigh, who served as the first violinist of the string quartet appointed by Beethoven. Schuppanzigh himself played in the premiere performance which took place on 14 March 1824.

== Structure ==
The quartet consists of four movements which last around 30 minutes in total.

1. Allegro ma non troppo (common time, A minor)
2. Andante (cut time, C major)
3. Menuetto: Allegretto – Trio (3/4, A minor, trio in A major)
4. Allegro moderato (2/4, A major)

The first movement opens with a texture reminiscent of the melancholic theme from one of Schubert's earliest songs, "Gretchen am Spinnrade" and also quotes "Schöne Welt, wo bist du?" The reference to "Gretchen am Spinnrade" is not a direct quotation, but rather is a similarity in the second violin's restless accompanimental figuration, hovering around the mediant and underpinned by a repeated figure in cello and viola, which precedes the first thematic entrance. This also recalls the accompaniment to the first subject of the "Unfinished" Symphony.

It is the second movement, however, which has lent the Quartet its nickname, being based on a theme from the incidental music for Rosamunde (a similar theme appears in the Impromptu in B-flat written three years later). The dactyl–spondee rhythm pervading this movement unmistakably shows the influence of Beethoven's Seventh Symphony. The form of this slow movement uses the same modified exposition-recapitulation form found in the slow movement of Schubert's "Great" C-major Symphony, where an ambiguity of formal definition is created by the introduction of a developmental passage shortly after the return of the primary theme in the recapitulation.

The minuet quotes the melody of another song by Schubert, Die Götter Griechenlandes, D. 677, from November 1819, a connection only first noticed by Willi Kahl, more than a century after the work's composition. The opening of this melody recurs in inversion at the beginning of the trio, and is later echoed in the opening of the finale.
