= String Quartet No. 13 (Beethoven) =

1826 composition designated Op. 130

- by Ludwig van Beethoven
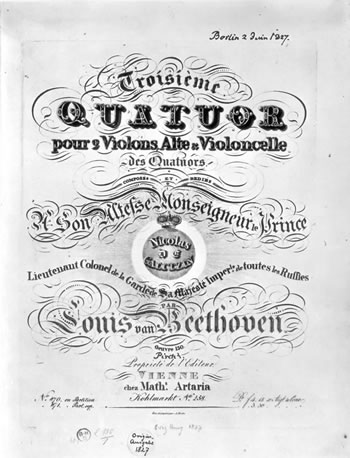
- Cover page as published in Berlin on 2 June 1827
- Key: B♭ major
- Opus: 130
- Composed: 1825
- Dedication: Nikolai Galitzin
- Published: 1827
- Duration: 45 minutes
- Movements: 6

Premiere
- Date: 21 March 1826
- Performers: Schuppanzigh Quartet

The String Quartet No. 13 in B♭ major, Op. 130, is one of the late string quartets by Ludwig van Beethoven. It was completed (in its final form) in November 1826. The number traditionally assigned to it is based on the order of its publication; it is actually Beethoven's 14th quartet in order of composition. It was premiered (in its original form) on 21 March 1826 by the Schuppanzigh Quartet and dedicated to Nikolai Galitzin on its publication in 1827.

== Movements ==
Beethoven originally wrote the work in six movements, lasting 42–50 minutes, as follows:

1. Adagio, ma non troppo – Allegro (B♭ major)
2. Presto (B♭ minor)
3. Andante con moto, ma non troppo. Un Poco scherzoso (D♭ major)
4. Alla danza tedesca. Allegro assai (G major)
5. Cavatina. Adagio molto espressivo (E♭ major)
6. Große Fuge (Grande Fugue Op. 133): Ouverture. Allegro – Meno mosso e moderato – Allegretto – Fuga. [Allegro] – Meno Mosso e moderato – Allegro molto e con brio – Allegro (B♭ major)

(Nomenclature: "danza tedesca" means "German dance", "Cavatina" a short and simple song, and "Große Fuge" means "Great Fugue" or "Grand Fugue".)

The work is unusual among quartets in having six movements. They follow the pattern of movements seen in the Ninth Symphony and occasionally elsewhere in Beethoven's work (opening, dance movement, slow movement, finale), except that the middle part of the cycle is repeated: opening, dance movement, slow movement, dance movement, slow movement, finale.

=== New finale ===
Negative reaction to the work's complex final movement at the first performance, and his publisher's urging, led Beethoven to write a substitute for the final movement, a contredanse much shorter and lighter than the titanic Große Fuge it replaced. This new finale was written in the late autumn of 1826, during Beethoven's relapse into severe illness, and is the last piece of music Beethoven finished before his death in March 1827. It is marked "Finale: Allegro in B♭ major". Beethoven never witnessed a performance of the quartet in its final form; it premiered on 22 April 1827, nearly a month after his death.

The original finale was published separately under the title Große Fuge as Opus 133. Performances sometimes follow the composer's original intentions, leaving out the substitute finale and concluding with the fugue. British composer Robert Simpson argues that Beethoven's intentions are best served by playing the quartet as a seven-movement work, with the Große Fuge followed by the replacement finale.

== Judgments ==
The cavatina that serves as the fifth movement is generally considered the quartet's pinnacle. According to Michael Steinberg, it is "one of Beethoven's most inward and wonderful slow movements." Beethoven declared "that he had composed this cavatina truly in the tears of melancholy" and that "never had his own music made such an impression on him".

Some commentators also rank very high the freshness, grace and sensitivity of the third movement (Andante con moto, ma non troppo. Poco scherzando). It was Theodor Helm's favorite movement, and Daniel Gregory Mason used four bars of this movement as the frontispiece of his study of Beethoven's quartets.

== In media ==
The Cavatina (performed by the Budapest String Quartet) is the final piece on the Voyager Golden Record, a phonograph record containing a broad sample of Earth's sounds, languages, and music sent into interstellar space in 1977 aboard the two unmanned Voyager probes.

== Ownership of manuscript ==
Beethoven gave the score of opus 130's fourth movement to his secretary, Karl Holz. At least two private owners in Vienna are known to have later acquired it. In the early 20th century, it came into the possession of the Petscheks, a wealthy Czech Jewish family involved in banking and the mining industry.

Following the Nazi invasion of Czechoslovakia in 1938, the Petscheks fled to the United States. They attempted to send the score by post, but it was intercepted by the Gestapo. The Nazis asked an expert from The Moravian Museum in Brno to verify the score's authenticity. According to the current museum curator, Simona Šindelářová, the expert recognized Beethoven's handwriting, but in order to save the manuscript from being looted he lied to the Nazis and said it was not authentic. The museum was then allowed to keep it. It remained with the Moravian Museum for more than 80 years.

The Nazis seized most of the Petscheks' assets and possessions, which Czechoslovakia's Communist regime nationalized after the war. Franz Petschek, who had run the family's mining businesses in Czechoslovakia, tried from his new home in the U.S. to get the manuscript back but got scant sympathy from the Communist government.

In August 2022, the Moravian Museum returned the manuscript to the heirs of the Petschek family, adhering to the Terezín Declaration, which urged governments to make every effort to return former Jewish property confiscated by the Nazis, fascists, and their collaborators to its original owners.

Before returning the manuscript, the museum exhibited it for five days. It had not been exhibited during the museum's prolonged custody of it. "It's one of the most precious items in our collections", Šindelářová said. "We're sorry about losing it, but it rightly belongs to the Petschek family".

In 2024, the Beethoven House in Bonn acquired the original manuscript of the fourth movement.

== See also ==
- Late string quartets (Beethoven)

== Notes ==
Sources

- Kerman, Joseph (1988). Les quatuors de Beethoven [The Beethoven Quartets (1967)] (in French). Translated by Marcel Marnat. Paris: Seuil.
