= Ignaz Schuppanzigh =

Austrian violinist

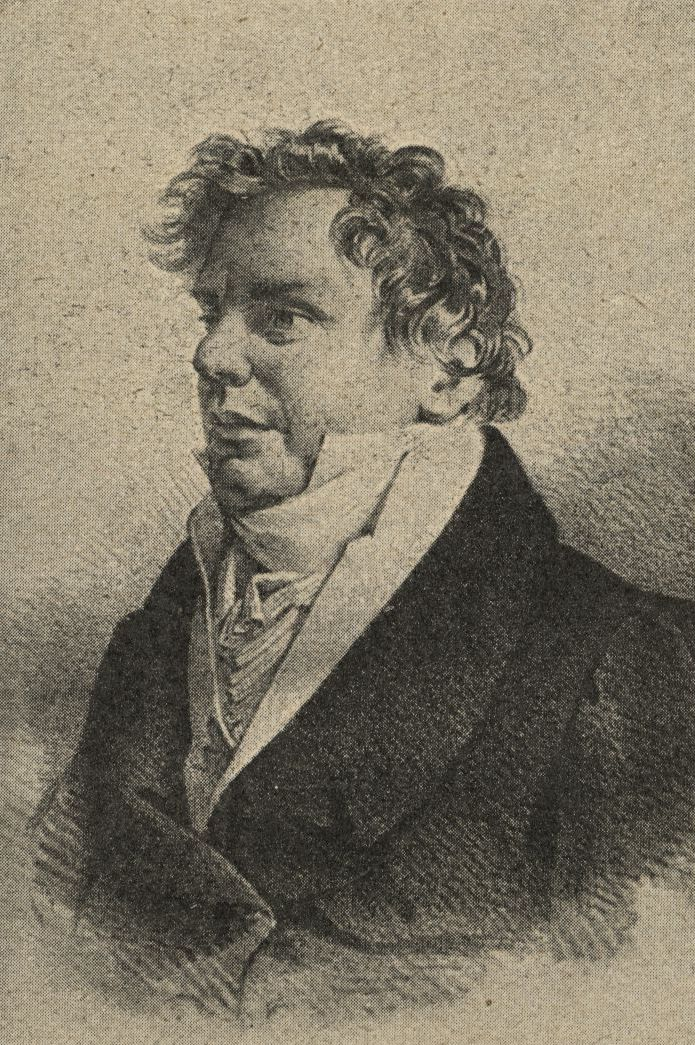
Portrait of Ignaz Schuppanzigh

Ignaz Schuppanzigh (20 July 1776 – 2 March 1830) was an Austrian violinist and friend of Beethoven, and leader of Count Razumovsky's private string quartet. Schuppanzigh and his quartet premiered many of Beethoven's string quartets, and in particular, the late string quartets. The Razumovsky quartet, which Schuppanzigh founded in late 1808, is considered to be the first professional string quartet. Until the founding of this quartet, quartet music was played primarily by amateurs or by professional musicians who joined together on an ad hoc basis.

== Biography ==
Schuppanzigh was born in Vienna, son of the professor of Italian at the Theresian Military Academy. After abandoning his early preference for the viola, he established himself before his 21st birthday as a virtuoso violist and violinist, as well as a conductor. He gave violin lessons to Beethoven, and they remained friends until Beethoven's death.

Schuppanzigh's dedication to his quartet playing played a pivotal role in the transition of quartet performance and composition. Prior to Beethoven, the quartet repertoire could be performed successfully by either competent amateurs or professionals with few rehearsals. Beethoven's quartets, starting with the three of Op. 59 dedicated to Count Razumovsky, introduced many new technical difficulties that could not be completely overcome without dedicated rehearsal. These difficulties include synchronized complex runs played by two or more instruments together, cross-rhythms and hemiolas, and difficult harmonies that require special attention to intonation. When informed that Schuppanzigh had complained about a particularly difficult passage, Beethoven is said to have remarked, "Does he really believe that I think about his silly fiddle when the muse strikes me to compose?"

Razumovsky's quartet also premiered works by other composers. Franz Schubert dedicated his A minor "Rosamunde" quartet to Schuppanzigh.

Schuppanzigh's was the first professional string quartet that gave concerts for subscription-paying audiences.

Schuppanzigh is said to have taken Beethoven to a brothel, incurring the composer's wrath, after which he avoided Beethoven for several months. Beethoven often joked about his corpulence, referring to him as 'Milord Falstaff', a comment aimed at both his weight and his propensity for food, drink and carousing. Beethoven wrote a short comical song dedicated to him, "Lob auf den Dicken – Schuppanzigh ist ein Lump" (Praise to the Fat One – Schuppanzigh is a rascal), WoO 100 (1801).

Schuppanzigh was described as being handsome in his youth, but in adult life he became seriously obese. Toward the end of his life, his fingers reputedly grew so fat that he was unable to play in tune. He reputedly died of paralysis in Vienna.
