= Bartók Quartet =

Hungarian string quartet

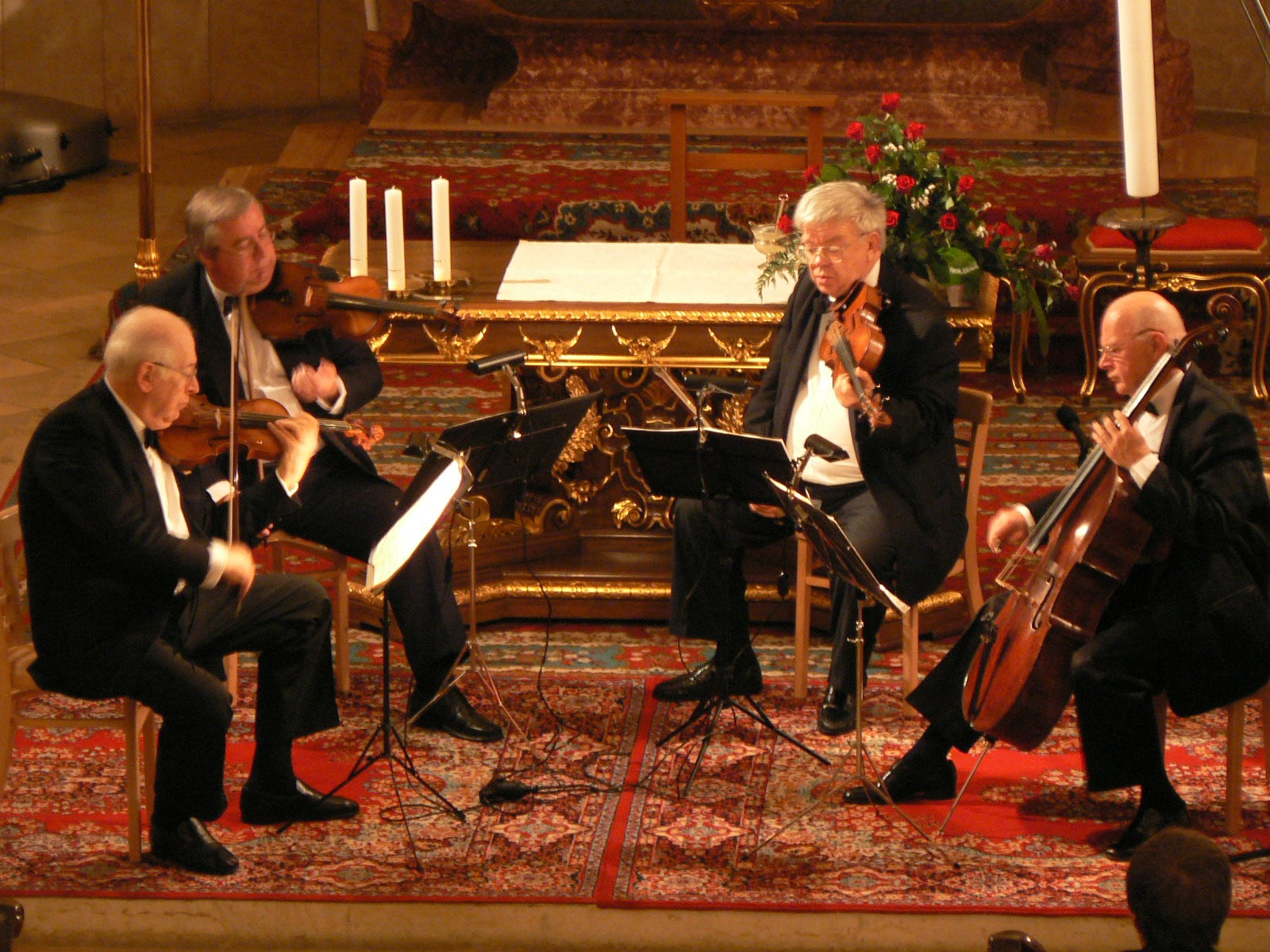

The Bartók Quartet is a Hungarian string quartet ensemble, founded in 1963 (63 years ago) in Budapest as the successor ensemble of the Komlós Quartet (1957–1963).

Their repertoire includes especially works of the Viennese Classicism and Béla Bartók as well as contemporary Hungarian composers.

== History ==
The Bartók Quartet is the successor ensemble of the Komlós Quartet which was founded in 1957 by students of the Franz Liszt Academy of Music.

In 1963, the ensemble was renamed the Bartók Quartet and had its first great success when it won 1st prize at the 1964 International String Quartet Competition in Liège.

The Bartók Quartet has participated in international music festivals, as well as outstanding ceremonies such as the opening of the world-famous Sydney Opera House and Human Rights Day in New York City at the UN.

The Quartet was awarded the Liszt Prize in 1965, the Kossuth Prize in 1970 and 1997; in 1981 they received the UNESCO Prize and the title, Outstanding Artists. In 1986, the ensemble received the Béla Bartók-Ditta Pásztory Prize.

The recording of the six Bartók String Quartets (Erato Records/EMI) was awarded the "Grand Prix" by European critics. Further recordings followed, including the complete string quartets of Beethoven and Brahms.

== Members ==
=== First violin ===
- Péter Komlós (1957–2017)

=== Second violin ===
- Sándor Devich (1957–1982)
- Béla Banfalvy (1982–1985)
- Géza Hargitai (1985–)

=== Viola ===
- Géza Németh (1957–)

=== Violoncello ===
- László Mezö (1957–1960 and 1977–)
- Károly Botvay (1960–1977)

== Recordings ==
- Johannes Brahms: Streichquintette F-dur op. 88, G-dur op. 111 (Deutsche Schallplatten, 1984)
- Johannes Brahms: Streichsextette B-dur op. 18, G-dur op. 36 (Deutsche Schallplatten, 1985)
- Das Schönste der deutschen Romantik – Chöre, Lieder, Balladen (Delta Music, 1986)
- Sternstunden der Musik (Deutscher Schallplatten-Club, 1987)
- Meditation – [Mehrteiliges Werk] Teil: Vol. 1. (1991)
- Felix Otto Dessoff: Kammermusik (Bella Musica, 1994)
- Klassik Radio – Musik für gewisse Stunden (Bella Musica, 1996)
- Pyotr Ilyich Tchaikovsky – String quartets op. 11 and op. 30 (Andreas Spreer, 2002)
- Meditation – classical relaxation / beautiful harmonies of great classical music (Delta Music, 2002)
- Meditation – Entspannen mit klassischer Musik (Delta Music, 2003)

Hungaroton

- Beethoven: String Quartets Nos. 1-16, Grosse Fuge (2001, HCD41004) Recorded between 1969 and 1972
  - Beethoven: String Quartet No. 1, String Quartet No. 2, String Quartet No. 3 (1990, HRC156)
  - Beethoven: String Quartet No. 4, String Quartet No. 5, String Quartet No. 6 (1990, HRC157)
  - Beethoven: String Quartet No. 7, String Quartet No. 9 (1990, HRC153)
  - Beethoven: String Quartet No. 8, String Quartet No. 10 (1987, HRC063)
  - Beethoven: String Quartet No. 11 (1990, HRC158)
  - Beethoven: String Quartet No. 12, String Quartet No. 14 (1989, HRC125)
  - Beethoven: String Quartet No. 13, Grosse Fuge (1989, HRC136)
  - Beethoven: String Quartet No. 15, String Quartet No. 16 (1989, HRC126)
- Brahms: String Sextet No. 1, String Sextet No. 2, String Quartets, Op. 51, String Quartet No. 3, String Quintet No. 1, String Quintet No. 2 (1975, HCD11591-93) with György Konrád (viola), Ede Banda (cello)
- Brahms: Piano Quintet, Clarinet Quintet (1975, HCD11596) with Dezső Ránki (piano), Béla Kovács (clarinet)
- Brahms: Piano Quartet No. 1, Piano Quartet No. 2, Piano Quartet No. 3 (1976, SLPX 11596-11600) Piano: Csilla Szabó, István Lantos, Sándor Falvai
- Dvořák: String Quartet No. 12 | Debussy: String Quartet | Ravel: String Quartet (1989, HRC122)
- Mendelssohn: String Quartet No. 1, String Quartet No. 3 (1990, HCD31107)
- Mendelssohn: Octet | Schoenberg: Verklärte Nacht (1994, HCD31351)
- Mozart: Haydn Quartets
  - Mozart: String Quartet No. 14, String Quartet No. 15 (1989, HRC129)
  - Mozart: String Quartet No. 16, String Quartet No. 17 (1989, HRC137)
  - Mozart: String Quartet No. 18, String Quartet No. 19 (1989, HRC138)
- Schubert: String Quintet (1997, CLD4035) with Miklós Perényi (cello)
- Schumann: Piano Quintet (1994, HCD31560) with Endre Hegedűs (piano)

== See also ==
- List of string quartets by Béla Bartók
