= Classic 100 Chamber (ABC) =

The following is a summary of the Classic 100 Chamber survey conducted by the ABC Classic FM radio station during 2008.

== Survey summary ==
Rank	Composer	Work	Opus	Completed	Key
100	Rachmaninoff	Cello Sonata	Op. 19	1901	G minor
99	Sibelius	String Quartet Voces intimae	Op. 56	1909	D minor
98	Haydn	String Quartet The Lark	Hob.III:63	1790	D major
97	Elgar	Salut d'Amour	Op. 12	1888	
96	Bach, JS	The Musical Offering (Musikalisches Opfer)	BWV1079	1747	
95	Dvořák	Piano Trio No. 3	Op. 65	1883	F minor
94	Brahms	Cello Sonata No. 1	Op. 38	1865	E minor
93	Poulenc	Sextet for Wind Quintet and Piano	Op. 100	1939	
92	Schubert	Adagio and Rondo concertante	D487	1816	F major
91	Nielsen	Wind Quintet	Op. 43	1922	
90	Pärt	Fratres for violin and piano		1977	
89	Beethoven	Wind Octet	Op. 103	1793	E♭ major
88	Mozart	Horn Quintet	K. 407	1782	E♭ major
87	Hummel	Piano Quintet	Op. 87	1816	E♭ minor
86	Fauré	Piano Quartet No.1	Op. 15	1883	C minor
85	Grieg	Violin Sonata No. 3	Op. 45	1887	C minor
84	Mozart	Trio for Piano, Clarinet and Viola Kegelstatt	K. 498	1786	E♭ major
83	Beethoven	String Quartet No. 9 Razumovsky No. 3	Op. 59	1808	C major
82	Beethoven	Quintet for Piano and Winds	Op. 16	1796	E♭ major
81	Strauss, R	Violin Sonata	Op. 18	1888	E♭ major
80	Mozart	String Quartet Hunt	K. 458	1784	B♭ major
79	Boccherini	String Quintet Night Music from the Streets of Madrid	G324	1780	C major
78	Beethoven	String Quartet No. 10 Harp	Op. 74	1809	E♭ major
77	Kats-Chernin	Russian Rag		2008	
76	Shostakovich	Piano Quintet	Op. 57	1940	G minor
75	Mozart	Piano Quartet No. 1	K. 478	1785	G minor
74	Schumann	Piano Quartet	Op. 47	1842	E♭ major
73	Mozart	Flute Quartet	K. 285	1778	D major
72	Janáček	String Quartet No. 2 Intimate Letters		1928	
71	Brahms	Violin Sonata No. 1	Op. 78	1879	G major
70	Hummel	Piano Trio	Op. 12	1803	E♭ major
69	Dvořák	Bagatelles	Op. 47	1878	
68	Boccherini	String Quintet	G275	1771	E major
67	Beethoven	Septet	Op. 20	1800	E♭ major
66	Schubert	String Quartet No. 15	D887	1826	G major
65	Schoenberg	Verklärte Nacht (Transfigured Night) for string sextet	Op. 4	1899	
64	Mozart	String Trio	K. 563	1788	E♭ major
63	Dvořák	Serenade for Winds	Op. 44	1878	
62	Beethoven	Piano Trio No. 5 Ghost	Op. 70	1809	D major
61	Beethoven	String Quartet No. 16	Op. 135	1826	F major
60	Schubert	Fantasie	D940	1828	F minor
59	Beethoven	String Quartet No. 7 Razumovsky No. 1	Op. 59	1806	F major
58	Beethoven	String Quartet No. 8 Razumovsky No. 2	Op. 59	1806	E minor
57	Beethoven	Cello Sonata No. 3	Op. 69	1808	A major
56	Barber	String Quartet	Op. 11	1936	
55	Carr-Boyd	Fandango		1982	
54	Mendelssohn	Piano Trio No. 2	Op. 66	1845	C minor
53	Ravel	Introduction and Allegro for Harp, Flute, Clarinet and String Quartet		1905	G♭ major
52	Smetana	String Quartet No. 1 From My Life		1876	E minor
51	Mozart	Oboe Quartet	K. 370	1781	F major
50	Beethoven	Violin Sonata Kreutzer	Op. 47	1803	A major
49	Beethoven	Grosse Fuge (Great Fugue)	Op. 133	1826	
48	Arensky	Piano Trio No. 1	Op. 32	1894	D minor
47	Tchaikovsky	Souvenir de Florence	Op. 70	1890	
46	Smetana	Piano Trio		1855	G minor
45	Mozart	Quintet for Piano and Winds	K. 452	1784	E♭ major
44	Brahms	Horn Trio	Op. 40	1865	E♭ major
43	Beethoven	String Quartet No. 12	Op. 127	1825	E♭ major
42	Pärt	Spiegel im Spiegel		1978	
41	Mozart	String Quintet	K. 516	1787	G minor
40	Beethoven	String Quartet No. 13	Op. 130	1825	B♭ major
39	Haydn	String Quartet Emperor	Hob.III:77	1797	C major
38	Brahms	Sextet No. 1	Op. 18	1860	B♭ major
37	Pachelbel	Canon		1694?	D major
36	Brahms	Piano Trio No. 1	Op. 8	1854	B major
35	Boccherini	Guitar Quintet	G448	1798	D major
34	Debussy	String Quartet	Op. 10	1893	G minor
33	Brahms	Piano Quartet No. 1	Op. 25	1861	G minor
32	Tchaikovsky	String Quartet No. 1	Op. 11	1871	D major
31	Dvořák	Piano Trio No. 4 Dumky	Op. 90	1891	E minor
30	Tchaikovsky	Piano Trio A la mémoire d'un grand artiste (In memory of a great artist)	Op. 50	1882	A minor
29	Ravel	Piano Trio		1914	A minor
28	Schubert	Octet	D803	1824	F major
27	Beethoven	String Quartet No. 14	Op. 131	1826	C♯ minor
26	Schumann	Piano Quintet	Op. 44	1842	E♭ major
25	Mozart	Serenade Gran partita	K. 361	1781 or 1782	B♭ major
24	Hoffstetter	Serenade (String Quartet – andante cantabile)	Op. 3 No. 5:II		F major
23	Brahms	Piano Quintet	Op. 34	1864	F minor
22	Messiaen	Quatuor pour le fin du temps (Quartet for the End of Time)		1941	
21	Beethoven	String Quartet No. 15	Op. 132	1825	A minor
20	Schubert	Arpeggione Sonata	D821	1824	A minor
19	Shostakovich	String Quartet No. 8	Op. 110	1960	C minor
18	Shostakovich	Piano Trio No. 2	Op. 67	1944	E minor
17	Franck	Violin Sonata in A		1886	A major
16	Schubert	Piano Trio No. 1	D898	1827	B♭ major
15	Dvořák	Piano Quintet	Op. 81	1887	A major
14	Mendelssohn	Piano Trio No. 1	Op. 49	1839	D minor
13	Ravel	String Quartet		1903	F major
12	Beethoven	Violin Sonata Spring	Op. 24	1801	F major
11	Brahms	Clarinet Quintet	Op. 115	1891	B minor
10	Dvořák	String Quartet No. 12 American	Op. 96	1893	F major
9	Schubert	Piano Trio No. 2	D929	1827	E♭ major
8	Mendelssohn	Octet	Op. 20	1825	E♭ major
7	Borodin	String Quartet No. 2		1881	D major
6	Mozart	Clarinet Quintet	K. 581	1789	A major
5	Schubert	String Quartet No. 14 Death and the Maiden	D810	1824	D minor
4	Beethoven	Piano Trio Archduke	Op. 97	1811	B♭ major
3	Schubert	Notturno for piano trio	D897	1827	E♭ major
2	Schubert	String Quintet	D956	1828	C major
1	Schubert	Piano Quintet Trout	D667	1819	A major

== By composer ==
The following 36 composers were featured in the countdown:

Composer	Nationality	Works
Arensky	Russian	1
Bach, JS	German	1
Barber	American	1
Beethoven	German	18
Boccherini	Italian	3
Borodin	Russian	1
Brahms	German	8
Carr-Boyd	Australian	1
Debussy	French	1
Dvořák	Czech	6
Elgar	English	1
Fauré	French	1
Franck	Belgian	1
Grieg	Norwegian	1
Haydn, J.	Austrian	2
Hoffstetter	German	1
Hummel	Austrian	2
Janáček	Czech	1
Kats-Chernin	Australian	1
Mendelssohn	German	3
Messiaen	French	1
Mozart	Austrian	11
Nielsen	Danish	1
Pachelbel	German	1
Poulenc	French	1
Pärt	Estonian	2
Rachmaninoff	Russian	1
Ravel	French	3
Schoenberg	Austrian-American	1
Schubert	Austrian	11
Schumann	German	2
Shostakovich	Russian	3
Sibelius	Finnish	1
Smetana	Czech	2
Strauss, R	German	1
Tchaikovsky	Russian	3

== See also ==
- Classic 100 Countdowns
