= String Quartet in F major (Beethoven) =

String Quartet in F major is one of four quartets by Beethoven:

- String Quartet No. 1 (Beethoven), Op. 18 no. 1, an early quartet
- String Quartet No. 7 (Beethoven), Op. 59 no. 1, a middle quartet
- String Quartet No. 16 (Beethoven), Op. 135, a late quartet
- String Quartet, Hess 34, an arrangement (1801) based on Piano Sonata No. 9

== See also ==
- String Quartet in F minor is String Quartet No. 11 (Beethoven), Op. 95, "Serioso", a middle quartet
