= Symphony No. 4 (Schubert) =

Symphony by Franz Schubert

- Tragic
- by Franz Schubert
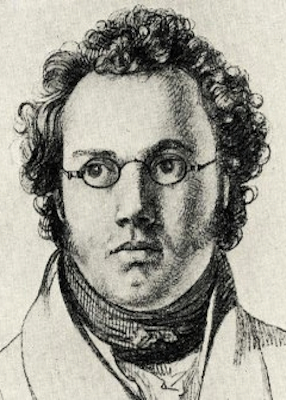
- 1821 Drawing of Franz Schubert by Joseph Kupelwieser
- Key: C minor
- Catalogue: D. 417
- Composed: 1816
- Duration: c. 32 minutes
- Movements: 4
- Scoring: Orchestra

The Symphony No. 4 in C minor, D 417, is a symphony by Franz Schubert completed in April 1816 when Schubert was 19 years old, a year after his Third Symphony. However, it was not premiered until November 19, 1849, in Leipzig, more than two decades after Schubert's death. The symphony was called the Tragic (German: Tragische) by its composer.

== Structure ==
Schubert added the title Tragic to his autograph manuscript some time after the work was completed. It is not known why. It can be noted, however, that the symphony is one of only two he wrote (the Unfinished Symphony is the other) in a minor key. The scoring is for two flutes, two oboes, two clarinets in B♭, two bassoons, four horns in A♭, C and E♭, two trumpets in C and E♭, timpani, and strings. There are four movements, and a performance lasts around 30 minutes.

1. Adagio molto – Allegro vivace (C minor – C major) (286 bars)
2. Andante (A♭ major) (271 bars)
3. Menuetto. Allegro vivace (E♭ major) (54 bars, Trio 32 bars)
4. Allegro (C minor – C major) (486 bars)

The slow introduction is modeled after Haydn's The Representation of Chaos overture to The Creation oratorio. The opening theme of the Allegro of the first movement derives from the opening theme of Ludwig van Beethoven's String Quartet, Op. 18 No. 4 in the same key.

The slow movement is in ABABA form, which would be a favorite form for most of Schubert's future symphonic slow movements. The themes in the B section are not new. They are developed from the Allegro theme of the first movement and the themes of the A section. The second appearance of B, the third return of A and the beginning of the coda have a sixteenth-note ostinato accompaniment added to help bring cohesiveness to the sections. This was a device that Beethoven had previously used in the slow movements of his Op. 18 No. 1 quartet and his Pathetique sonata.
