= Alex Szilasi =

Hungarian-Italian pianist

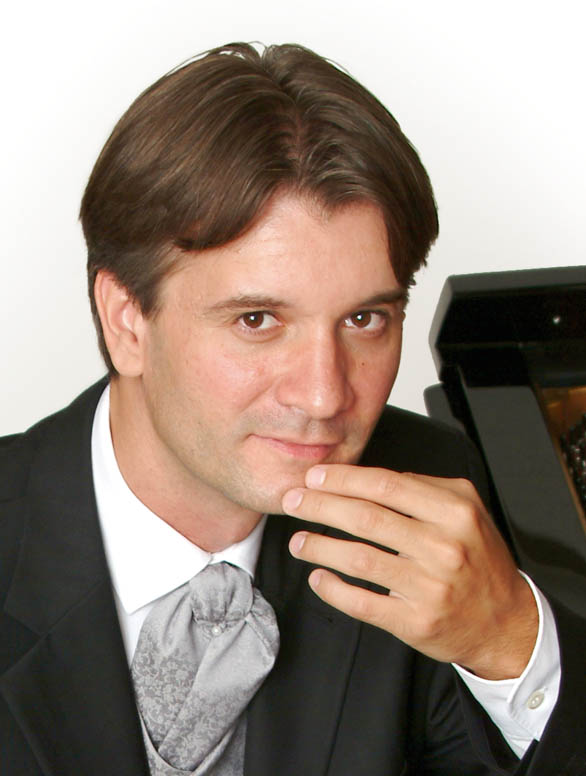
Szilasi Alex, Hungarian-Italian pianist

Alex Szilasi (born in Parma in 1968) is a Hungarian-Italian pianist. He graduated from the Ferenc Liszt Academy of Music in Budapest in 1993, where his professors were Ferenc Rados, Sándor Falvai and Péter Solymos. Szilasi gave his first recital in 1977 in Budapest. He has been a regular participant at international music festivals and has given concerts in England, Germany, France, Italy, Switzerland, Austria, Turkey, Russia, USA, South Korea, Canada and Poland. In 2001, he became the director of the "Esther" collection and the complete edition of Chopin, presented by Editions Fuzeau (France).47

== Recordings ==
Between 2005 and 2010, on the occasion of Frédéric Chopin's bicentennial, he performed the complete works of the composer in Budapest, and in parallel prepared the complete CD-recordings of his works on Pleyel pianos for the Hungarian Hungaroton Label. He was named by the editorial board of the Hungarian Classical and Jazz Magazine Gramofon as the 'Classical Musician of the Year' 2008. His work was remunerated by the Polish Chopin Bicentenary Committee with the "Chopin Passport" in October 2010.
