= String Quartets, Op. 59 (Beethoven) =

Set of three string quartets commissioned by Andreas Razumovsky

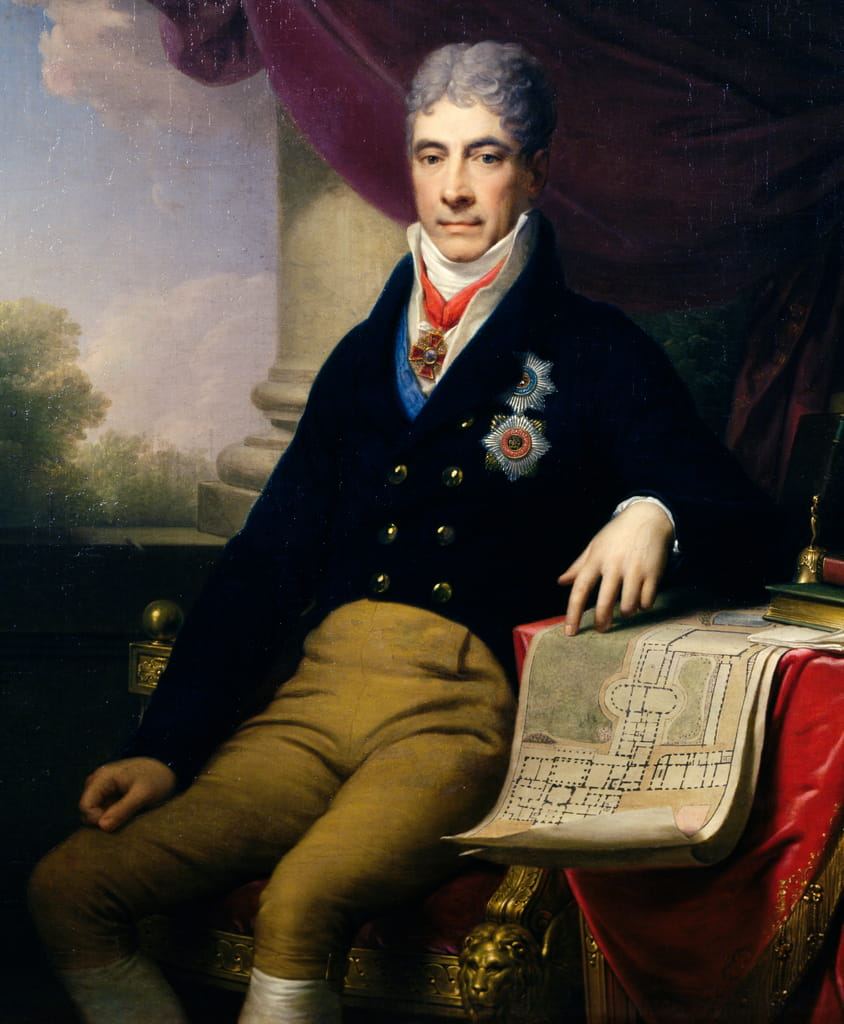
Portrait of Andrey Razumovsky (1810)

The three Razumovsky (or Rasumovsky) string quartets, opus 59, are a set of string quartets by Ludwig van Beethoven. He wrote them in 1806, as a result of a commission by the Russian ambassador in Vienna, Count Andreas Razumovsky:

- String Quartet No. 7 in F major, Op. 59, No. 1
- String Quartet No. 8 in E minor, Op. 59, No. 2
- String Quartet No. 9 in C major, Op. 59, No. 3

They are the first three of what are usually known as the "Middle Period" string quartets, or simply the "Middle Quartets." The other two are opus 74 and opus 95. Many quartets record all five as a set.

== Themes ==
Beethoven uses a characteristically "Russian" theme in the first two quartets in honour of the count who gave him the commission.

Due to the Ukrainian Cossack origins of the Razumovsky dynasty, the quartets also contain Ukrainian folk melodies.

=== Op. 59, No. 1 ===
The "Thème russe" (as the score is marked) is the principal theme of the last movement.

According to Kyrylo Vadymovych Stetsenko it contains the melody of the ukrainian folk song "Oi, na dvori metelytsia" ("Oh, there's a snowstorm outside").

=== Op. 59, No. 2 ===
The Thème russe is in the B section of the third movement. The thème russe is based on a Russian folk song which was also utilised by Modest Mussorgsky in the coronation scene of his opera Boris Godunov, by Pyotr Tchaikovsky in the introduction to act III of his opera Mazeppa, by Sergei Rachmaninoff in the sixth movement of his 6 Morceaux for Piano Duet, Op.11 "Slava" ("Glory"), and by Igor Stravinsky in his ballet The Firebird.

The melody of the Ukrainian folk song "Vid Kyieva do Luben" ("From Kyiv to Lubny") can be heard, according to K.V. Stetsenko.

=== Op. 59, No. 3 ===
There is no Thème russe explicitly named in the score, but a secondary theme in the second movement has a passing resemblance to a traditional Russian song, there is which may well account for the Russian flavour noted by a number of writers, including Lewis Lockwood.

All three quartets were published as a set in 1808 in Vienna.

== Reception ==
Although the quartets are now mainstream repertoire, they were generally received with uncertainty, as they deviated from the established genre of string quartets in their content and emotional range. However, one review published in 1807 stated that "Three new, very long and difficult Beethoven string quartets … are attracting the attention of all connoisseurs. The conception is profound and the construction excellent, but they are not easily comprehended."

== See also ==
- List of compositions by Ludwig van Beethoven
- String Quartets Nos. 1–6, Op. 18 (Beethoven)
- Late String Quartets (Beethoven)

== Sources and further reading ==
- Joseph Kerman, The Beethoven Quartets. New York, W.W. Norton & Co., 1966. ISBN 0-393-00909-2
- David Vernon, Beethoven: The String Quartets, Edinburgh, Candle Row Press, 2023 ISBN 978-1739659929
- Robert Winter and Robert Martin, ed., The Beethoven Quartet Companion. Berkeley, University of California Press, 1994. ISBN 0-520-08211-7
