= String Quartet in B flat major (Beethoven) =

String Quartet in B♭ major may refer to one of two string quartets by Beethoven:

- String Quartet No. 6 (Beethoven), Opus 18 Number 6
- String Quartet No. 13 (Beethoven), Opus 130

== See also ==
- Grosse Fuge, Opus 133, originally the final movement of Quartet No. 13
