= Ann Carr =

Ann Carr may refer to:

- Ann Carr (gymnast), American gymnast
- Ann Carr (evangelist) (1783–1841), British evangelist
- Ann Carr-Boyd (born 1938), Australian composer

== See also ==
- Ann Carr-Boyd, Australian classical composer and musicologist
- Anne Carr, Catholic nun and feminist theologian
- Anne Carr, Countess of Bedford
