= Dezső Ránki =

Hungarian virtuoso concert pianist (born 1951)

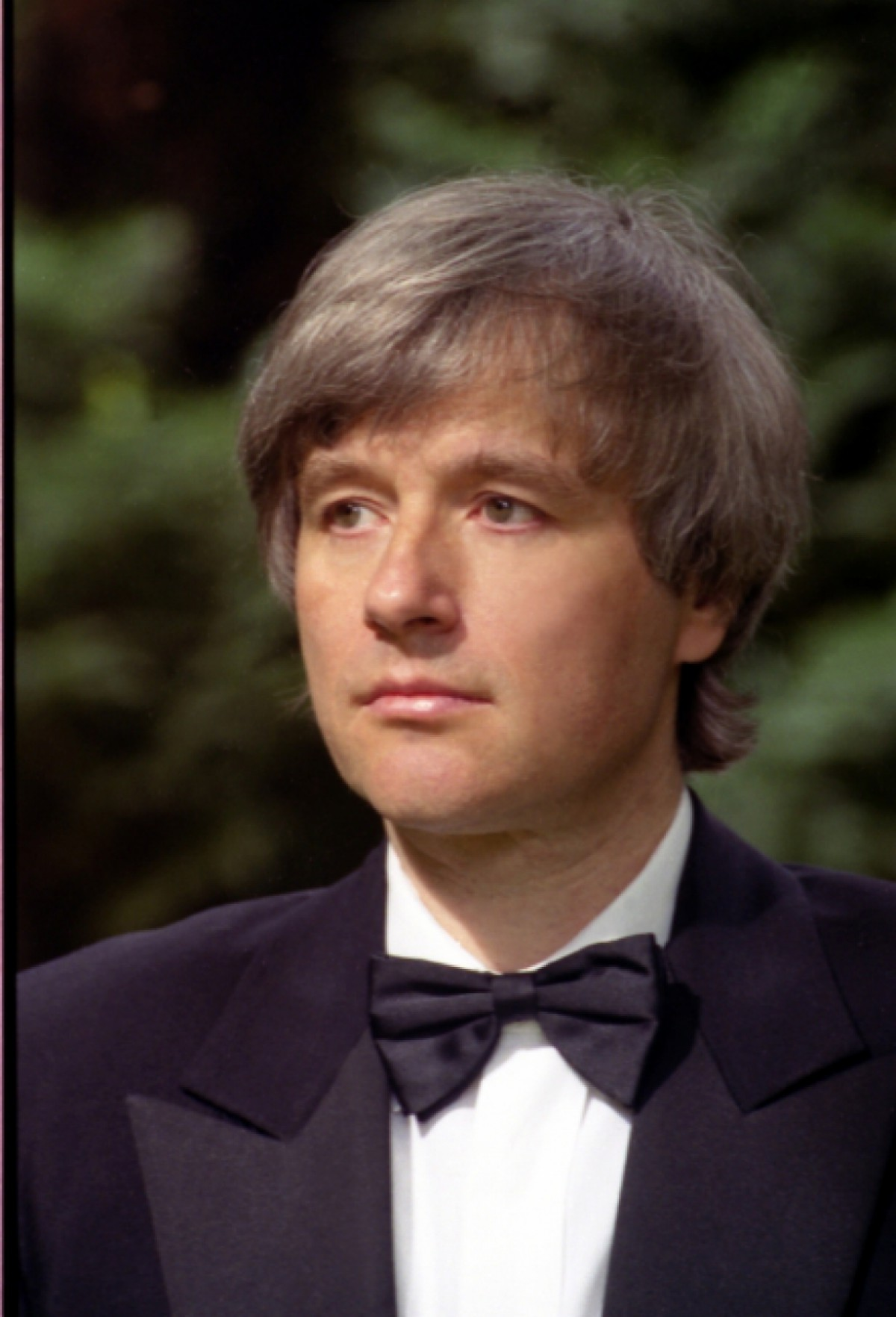
- Born: 8 September 1951 (age 75); Budapest
- Education: Franz Liszt Academy of Music
- Occupation: pianist

Dezső Ránki (born 8 September 1951) is a Hungarian virtuoso concert pianist.

== Life and career ==
Born in Budapest, he began taking piano lessons at the Budapest Academy of Music at the age of eight. When he was thirteen, he enrolled at the Budapest Conservatory and from 1964 to 1969 was a pupil of Klára Máthé. Subsequently he studied from 1969 to 1973 at the Franz Liszt Academy of Music, with his mentors Pál Kadosa and Ferenc Rados. Among his classmates were renowned pianists András Schiff and Zoltán Kocsis. With Kocsis he featured in two Hungarian documentaries, on the Budapest Symphony Orchestra tour of the US 'Tizenhatezer Kilometer... A MRT Szimfonikus Zenekara Amerikaban' (1971), and 'Kocsis Zoltán es Ránki Dezső – Kettős Arckép' (1976) 'Kocsis Zoltán and Ránki Dezső – Double Portrait'.

From the time Ránki won first prize at the Robert Schumann International Competition in Zwickau, he has had an international career performing in Europe, Scandinavia, the Soviet Union, the USA and Japan. His repertoire ranges from the Classical period (Mozart, Beethoven), through the Romantics (Schumann, Brahms) to contemporary works (Kurtag). He gave the premiere of the piano concerto (1984) of Zsolt Durkó.

He has played with the Berlin Philharmonic Orchestra, the London Philharmonic Orchestra, the Concertgebouw (Amsterdam), the Orchestre National de France under such conductors as Sir Georg Solti, Sándor Végh, Lorin Maazel, and Zubin Mehta. He was awarded twice the Kossuth Prize, the highest cultural award in Hungary.

From 1985, Ránki frequently performs duet recitals with his wife Edit Klukon. Together they have a son, Fülöp Ránki, who is also a skilled pianist. He has been a professor at the Ferenc Liszt Academy in Budapest.

== Discography ==
Ránki has recorded mainly for Hungaroton; his large discography includes:

- Bartók : Three Burlesques Op. 8c / Allegro Barbaro / The First Term At The Piano / Sonatina / Rumanian Folk Dances / Rumanian Christmas Carols / Suite Op. 14 / Three Hungarian Folk-Tunes (Hungaroton, 1967)
- Schumann : Piano Concerto in A minor Op. 54 (Hungaroton, 1970)
- Chopin : Etudes, Op. 10 / Nocturne In B Major, Op.9/3 / Ballade In F Major, Op. 38 / Ballade In G Minor, Op. 23 (Hungaroton 1971). Awarded the Grand Prix de l'Académie Charles Cros
- Beethoven : Sonata No.8 C-Moll, Op. 13 'Pathétique', Sonata No.24 In F Sharp Major, Op. 78, Sonata No.21 In C Major, Op. 53 'Waldstein' (Hungaroton, 1971)
- Mozart : Sonata for Two Pianos in D Major, K448 / Ravel Ma Mère l'Oye / Brahms Variations on a Theme of Haydn, Op. 56b with Zoltan Kocsis (Hungaroton, 1973)
- Mozart : Concerti for Two and Three Pianos, with Zoltán Kocsis, András Schiff, Hungarian State Orchestra, János Ferencsik (Hungaroton, 1973)
- Schumann : Carnaval / Waldszenen (Hungaroton, 1973)
- Schubert : Wanderer Fantasie, Klavierstück in E♭, Piano Sonata in G (Hungaroton, 1974)
- Schubert : Sonata in B-Flat Major, Impromptus (Denon, 1975)
- Bartók : Sonata for Two Pianos and Percussion, with Zoltán Kocsis, Ferenc Petz, József Marton (Hungaroton, 1976)
- Mozart : Complete Keyboard Solo Music (Hungaroton, 1976)
- Bartók : Mikrokozmosz, For Children (1908–1909) (Hungaroton, 1977)
- Debussy : Images I-II / Children's Corner / L'Isle Joyeuse (Hungaroton, 1977)
- Liszt : Dante Sonata (Hungaroton, 1978)
- Mozart : Sonatas for Piano Duet (complete) with Zoltán Kocsis, (Hungaroton, 1978)
- Mozart : Piano Concertos: No. 9 & No. 14 (Hungaroton, 1978)
- Stravinsky : Három Tétel A Petruskából / Piano-Rag-Music / Tango / Szerenád A-ban / Szonáta (Hungaroton, 1979)
- Schumann : Kinderszenen Op.15 / Fantasy Op.17 / Arabeske Op.18 (Hungaroton, 1979)
- Beethoven : Sonatas and Variations for Cello and Piano (Complete) with Miklós Perényi (Hungaroton, 1979)
- Mozart : Piano Quartets KV 478 & 493, with the Éder Quartet (Telefunken, 1979)
- Brahms : Piano Quintet in F Minor. Op. 34, with the Bartók Quartet (Hungaroton, 1980)
- Weiner, Strawinsky, Bartók, Schumann, Verdi, Debussy (works for clarinet) with Kálmán Berkes
- Chopin : Preludes (Hungaroton, 1982)
- Lieder by Schubert, Schumann, Brahms, Liszt, Wolf (Hungaroton, 1982)
- Brahms : Horn Trio / Beethoven Horn Sonata / R. Strauss Andante with Ferenc Tarjáni, Gábor Takács-Nagy (Hungaroton, 1983)
- Ravel : Sonatine, Valses Nobles et Sentimentales, Gaspard de la nuit, Menuet sur le nom d'Haydn, Prelude (Hungaroton, 1984)
- Brahms : Intermezzi op.116–119, Ballades op.10, (Harmonia Mundi France, 1994)
- Bartók : Piano Concerto No. 3, Three Burlesques, Allegro Barbaro, Suite Op. 14 (Hungaroton, 1994)
- Satie : Socrate, Liszt Via Crucis with Edit Klukon, (Budapest Music Center Records 2005)

== Awards ==
- 1972 Grand Prix du Disque for Chopin recital (1971)
- 1973 Liszt Prize
- 1978 Kossuth Prize
- 1982 Art Prize of City of Budapest
- 1984 Merited Artist
- 1988 Bartók-Pásztory Award
- 1990 Excellent Artist
- 2005 Prima Primissima Award
- 2006 Bartók Memorial Award (Herend)
- 2007 For Hungarian Art
- 2008 Kossuth Prize
