= String Quartet (Manrique de Lara) =

Composition by Manuel Manrique de Lara (1893)

- by Manuel Manrique de Lara
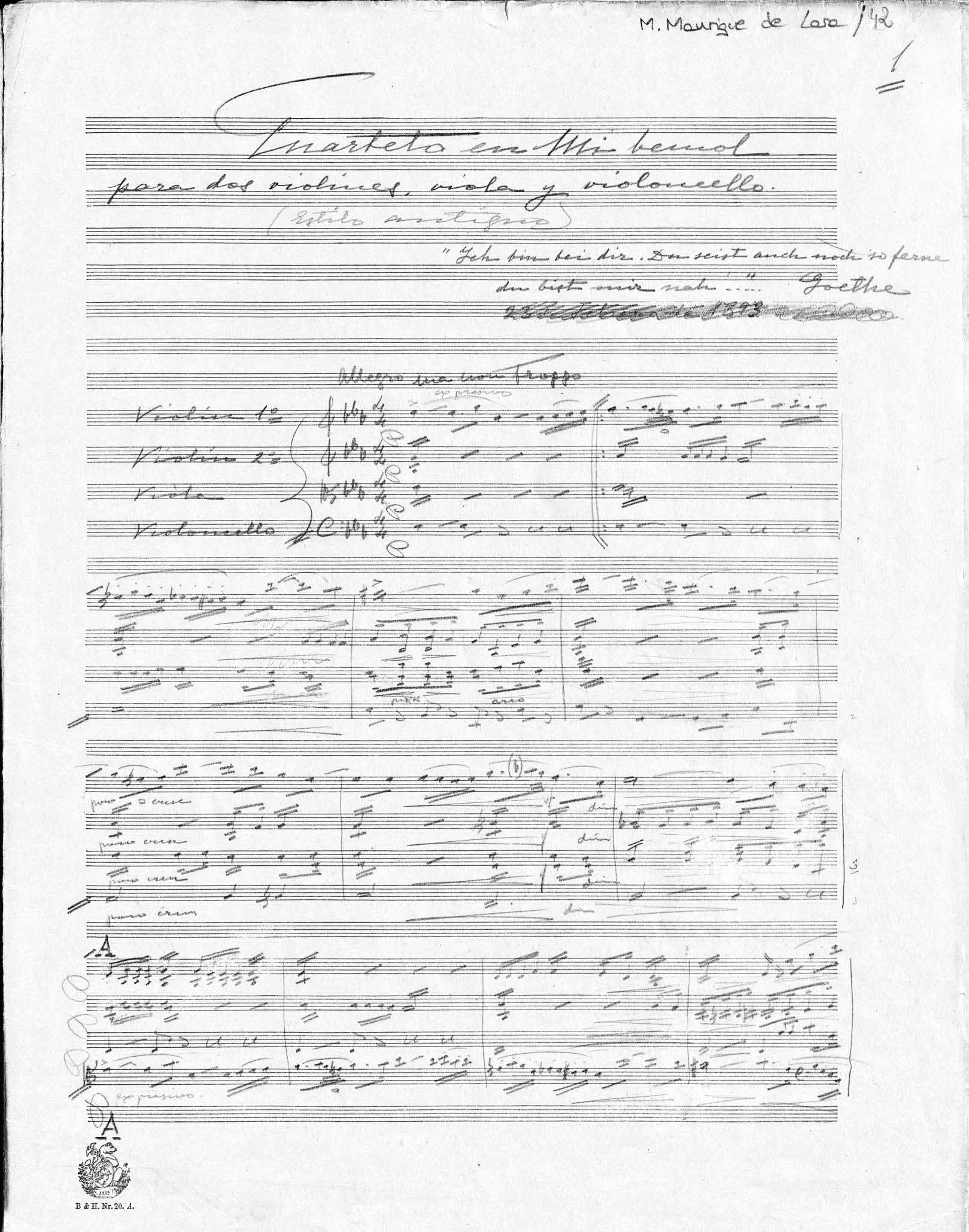
- First page of the manuscript score, with the Goethe epigraph
- Native name: Cuarteto de corda en Mi bemol (estilo antiguo)
- Key: E♭ major
- Composed: 1893: Madrid
- Performed: 1905: Madrid
- Published: 2015:
- Scoring: 2 violins, viola, cello

The String Quartet in E♭ major "in old style" (en estilo antiguo) is the only chamber music piece by Spanish composer Manuel Manrique de Lara. It dates back to 1893, the last year he studied with Ruperto Chapí, and was preceded in 1892 by the Symphony in E minor, also subtitled in old style. Though Manrique de Lara was a passionate follower of Richard Wagner, this quartet does not show any traces of it.

The first performance of the quartet took place only in 1905 by the members of Madrid Cuarteto Francés. There is a mention of a further 1910 performance. The first modern performance was given by Cuarteto Bécquer (Madrid) in 2015. The same year a critical edition of the score was published by musicologist Diana Díaz.

== Structure ==
The quartet is in four traditional movements, the second commemorating the death of Ludwig van Beethoven (it uses some material from his String Quartet No. 7).

The four movements are:

1. Allegro ma non troppo
2. Elegía (26-III-1827). Andante sostenuto
3. Scherzo. Molto vivace
4. Rondó. Allegretto mosso

An epigraph from Johann Wolfgang von Goethe's poem Nähe des Geliebten (Goethe) is placed before the first movement: Ich bin bei dir; du seist auch noch so ferne, / Du bist mir nah....

== Sources ==
- Diana Díaz. El cuarteto en Mi bemol en estilo antiguo de Manuel Manrique de Lara. Revista de Musicología. Vol. 36, No. 1/2 (2013), pp. 281–306
- Diana Díaz. Una obra recuperada: el Cuarteto de cuerda de Manuel Manrique de Lara (2015) - www.forumclasico.es
