= Marchisano =

Marchisano is a surname. Notable people with the surname include:

- Elena-Cristina Marchisano (born 1979), Romanian actress
- Francesco Marchisano (1929–2014), Italian cardinal

== See also ==
- Matteo Marchisano-Adamo (born 1973), American sound designer, film editor and composer
