= Dénes Várjon =

Hungarian pianist (born 1968)

- Born: 23 February 1968 (age 58); Budapest, Hungary
- Education: Franz Liszt Academy of Music
- Occupations: Pianist; conductor

Dénes Várjon (born 23 February 1968) is a Hungarian pianist known for his solo performances. He frequently performs as a chamber musician.

== Biography ==
Born on 23 February 1968 in Budapest, Várjon studied since 1984 at the Liszt Ferenc Academy of Music and graduated in 1991. He was a student of Sándor Falvai, György Kurtág and Ferenc Rados. He attended master classes with András Schiff. His chamber music partners have been Antje Weithaas Steven Isserlis, Veronika Hagen, Leonidas Kavakos, András Schiff, Tabea Zimmermann and Jörg Widmann.

Since 2018, Várjon is Principal Professor in the Kronberg Academy Study Programmes. Since 2019, he has been leading the "Complete Works Live" series in Budapest, which focuses on Robert Schumann's chamber music for piano. In 2020, he received the Kossuth Prize, Hungary's highest cultural award. He is professor at the Liszt Ferenc Academy of Music.

Várjon has recorded for ECM Records, Naxos, Capriccio and for Hungaroton Classics.

== Personal life ==
Várjon is married to pianist Izabella Simon.

== Awards ==
- Leó Weiner Chamber Music Competition in Budapest
- Hungarian Radio's National Piano Competition
- 1991 Concours Géza Anda in Zürich
- 1997 Franz Liszt Prize
- 1997 Sándor Veress Prize
- 2016 Bartók-Pásztory Award
- 2020 Kossuth Prize

== Recordings ==
- Bartók, Béla; Debussy, Claude; Kodály, Zoltán; Martinů, Bohuslav; Mendelssohn Bartholdy, Felix; Schumann, Robert; Perényi, Miklós; Várjon, Dénes; Keller, András; Concerto Budapest (2022), Summary Vol. 2 Bartók, Debussy, Kodály, Martinů, Mendelssohn, Schumann / Miklós Perényi, violoncello; Dénes Várjon, piano; Concerto Budapest, András Keller (in German), [Stuttgart]: Tacet, OCLC 1351366347
- Kabalevskij, Dmitrij; Isserlis, Steven; Karabits, Kirill; Bell, Joshua; Várjon, Dénes; Hough, Stephen; Mendelssohn-Bartholdy, Felix; Brahms, Johannes; Bournemouths Symfoniorkester (2011), Kabalevsky, Mendelssohn & Brahms (in undetermined language), [London]: BBC Music, OCLC 871516637
- Schumann, Robert; Hölderlin, Friedrich; Richter, Christoph; Várjon, Dénes; Schumann, Clara; Holliger, Heinz; Südwestrundfunk (Stuttgart). Vokalensemble; SWR Radio-Sinfonieorchester Stuttgart (2009), Romancendres Heinz Holliger, Clara Schumann (in German), München: ECM Records, OCLC 884459867
- Berg, Alban; Janáček, Leoš; Liszt, Franz; Várjon, Dénes (2012), Precipitando (in German), Gräfelfing, Berlin: ECM-Records-Verlag Universal Music, Vertrieb, OCLC 1184481904
- Holliger, Heinz; Schumann, Clara; Richter, Christoph; Várjon, Dénes; SWR Vokalensemble Stuttgart; Radio-Sinfonieorchester Stuttgart des SWR (2009), Romancendres (in German), München, [Berlin: ECM Records Universal Music, Vertrieb], OCLC 1184367639
- Beethoven, Ludwig van; Weithaas, Antje; Várjon, Dénes (2023), Violin sonatas nos. 2, 4 & 9 : Kreutzer (in no linguistic content), CAvi-music, OCLC 1393189212
- Beethoven, Ludwig van; Weithaas, Antje; Várjon, Dénes (2023), Violin sonatas nos. 3, 7 & 8 (in no linguistic content), CAvi-music, OCLC 1422600945
- Várjon, Dénes; Simon, Izabella; Ravel, Maurice; Fauré, Gabriel; Debussy, Claude (2022), The French album (in no linguistic content), Hungaroton New Releases, OCLC 1350793231
