= Andres Carciente =

Venezuelan pianist

Andres Carciente is a Venezuelan pianist.

== Biography ==
He was born and graduated in Caracas as a Performer Professor of Piano. In Venezuela he studied with the American/Venezuelan pianist Harriet Serr and chamber music with Judit Jaimes. His debut as a soloist was playing Mendelssohn's Piano Concerto Nr. 1 with the Simon Bolivar Orchestra. Soon after that he won First Prize at the Young Soloist Competition organized by the Symphonic Orchestra of Venezuela.

Andres studied at the Liszt Music Academy with Ferenc Rados (piano and chamber music) and parallelly at the Mozarteum in Salzburg with Karl-Heinz Kämmerling, and has given concerts in the following cities: London, Madrid, Rome, Vienna, Prague, Budapest, Helsinki, Bergen, Stavanger, Vilnius, Athens, Luzern, Eisenach, Montpellier, Melilla, Seoul, Ceuta.,Cancun and Bristol.

He played at the 250th Anniversary of Johann Sebastian Bach a concert at the Wartburg in Eisenach, which was broadcast by Radio Berlin Deutschland. He also participated in the Chamber Music Workshop of Gyorgy Kurtag at the Konzerthaus in Vienna. Andres inaugurated the Steinway piano donated by Georg Solti in a concert at the Liszt Museum in Budapest.

The music of Johann Sebastian Bach occupies a special place in his repertoire. Andres Carciente has been the only Venezuelan pianist to have played by heart in concerts the cycle of Bach's 6 Partitas and the Well Tempered Clavier ( Book I, Complete).

Venezuelan composer Gonzalo Castellanos Yumar dedicated his Prelude for Piano "Crepitante" to Andres Carciente.

His hobby is genealogy with more than 1500 names and stories in his family tree.

Carciente's favorite writer is Arturo Uslar Pietri.
