= Nikolaus Zmeskall =

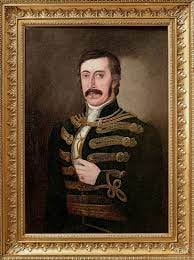
Portrait of Zmeskall by an unknown artist

Count Nikolaus Zmeskall von Domanovecz (20 November 1759, Leštiny, Kingdom of Hungary (present day Slovakia) – 23 June 1833, Vienna, Austria) was an official in the Hungarian Court Chancellery, living in Vienna. He was a musician and friend of Ludwig van Beethoven.

== Life ==
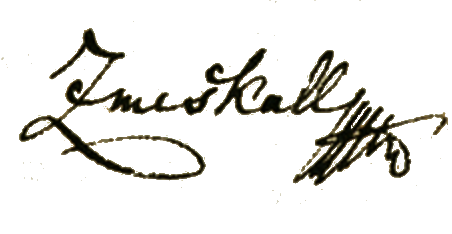
Signature of Nikolaus Zmeskall

Zmeskall was educated at Neusohl (now Banská Bystrica in Slovakia), and studied philosophy and law at the universities of Trnava and Pest. After qualifying as a lawyer he moved to Vienna in 1784, where he was a civil servant at the Hungarian Court Chancellery.

He was an amateur musician, and according to his own account he had lessons in composition from Wolfgang Amadeus Mozart and Johann Georg Albrechtsberger. He played the cello, and there were regular sessions of chamber music on Sundays at his house in the Bürgerspital part of Vienna. He was a founding member of the Gesellschaft der Musikfreunde in Vienna, and was a member of its committee from 1813 to 1825. His compositions include string quartets, a piano rondo and several cello sonatas; they are in the archives of the Gesellschaft der Musikfreunde.

From 1820 he was in poor health, suffering from gout; this reduced his musical activities, and he retired from his office in 1825. He died in Vienna in 1833.

=== Friend of Beethoven ===
Zmeskall was one of Beethoven's earliest friends in Vienna, meeting him in the 1790s, probably in the house of the composer's patron Prince Lichnowsky. He remained a faithful friend for the rest of the composer's life. From 1806, when Beethoven broke relations with Prince Lichnowsky, most of his chamber music was first played in Zmeskall's house.

There are more than 100 letters and notes from Beethoven to Zmeskall. They often met in the tavern Zum Schwan near Bürgerspital; Zmeskall gave minor help to Beethoven, such as providing him with quills, a watch, and loaning books.

A work by Beethoven written in 1796 or 1797, for viola and cello, WoO 32, entitled "Duet mit zwei obligaten Augengläsern" ("Duet with two obbligato eyeglasses"), is thought to have been written for Beethoven and Zmeskall, who both wore spectacles, to play together. Beethoven dedicated his String Quartet No. 11 in F minor (published in 1816) to Zmeskall.

In May 1824 Zmeskall, despite being in poor health, was present at the premiere of Beethoven's Symphony No. 9. Beethoven, a month before his death, wrote his last letter to Zmeskall, in which he hoped they would both be restored to health.
