= Péter Komlós =

Hungarian violinist (1935–2017)

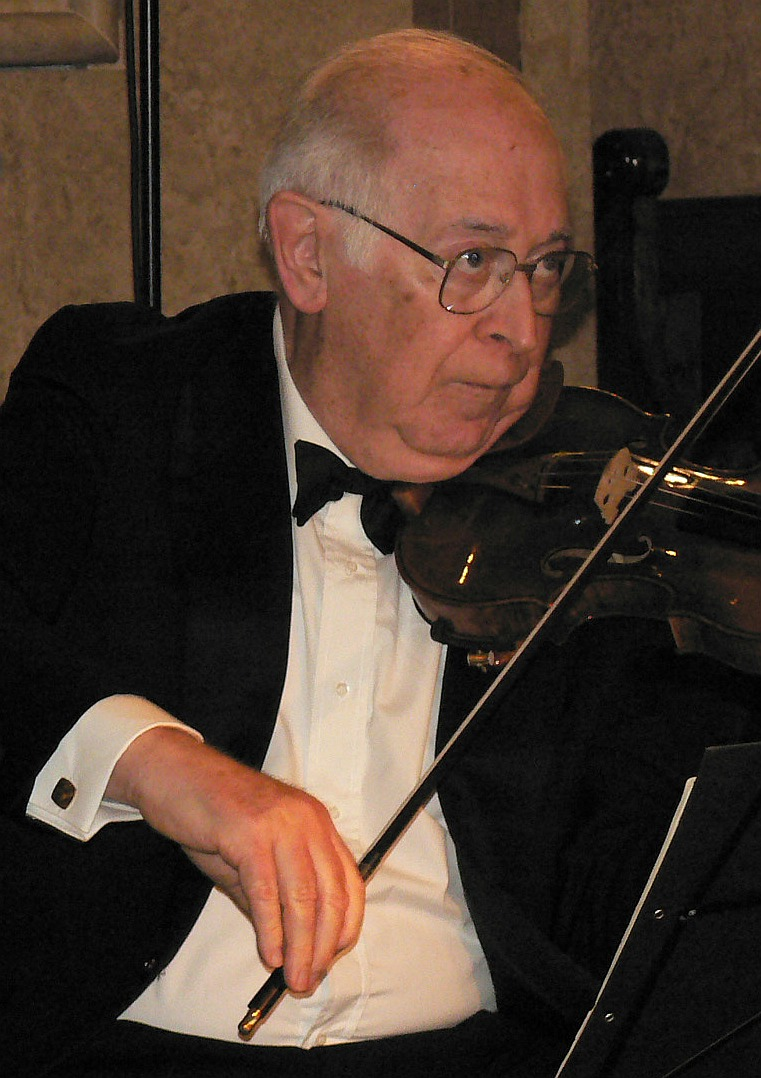
Péter Komlós in 2009

Péter Komlós (25 October 1935 – 2 May 2017) was a Hungarian violinist, known particularly as the founder of the Bartók String Quartet.

== Life ==
Péter Komlós was born in Budapest in October 1935, and studied at the Franz Liszt Academy of Music with Ede Zathureczky, Leó Weiner and others.

In 1957, with other graduates of the Academy, he established the Komlós String Quartet, in which he played first violin; the other members were Sándor Devich, Géza Németh and László Mező. In 1960 Károly Botvay replaced Mező (and there were further replacements in later years). The quartet was renamed the Bartók String Quartet in 1963.

In 1964 the quartet won first prize at the International String Quartet Competition in Liège, Belgium, and subsequently the quartet had an international career. There was a wide repertoire, with an emphasis on Béla Bartók's string quartets. A number of Hungarian composers dedicated their works to the quartet.

Komlós was concertmaster of the Hungarian State Opera Orchestra from 1960 to 1969. From 1982 he was an associate professor at the Franz Liszt Academy.

He received the Liszt Prize in 1964, and the Bartók-Pásztory Prize in 1986. In 1970 he received the Kossuth Prize; in 1997 he and the other members of the Bartók String Quartet received a further Kossuth Prize.

Péter Komlós died on 2 May 2017, aged 81.
