= Miklós Perényi =

Hungarian cellist

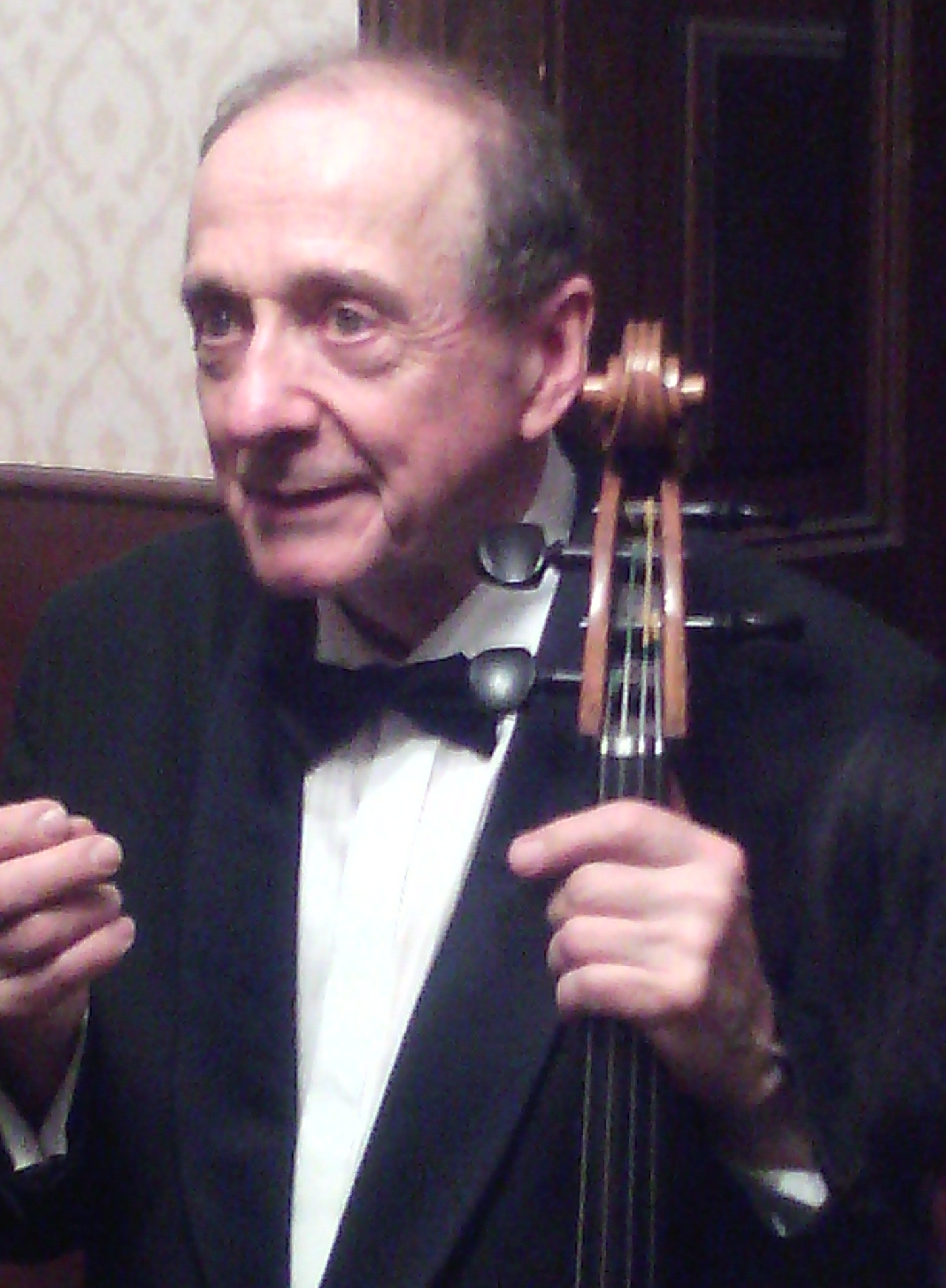
- Miklós Perényi in 2018
- Born: 5 January 1948 (age 78); Budapest, Hungary
- Occupation: Cellist

Miklós Perényi (born 5 January 1948) is a Hungarian cellist. He was born in Budapest into a musical family and studied at the Franz Liszt Academy of Music in Budapest with Ede Banda and Enrico Mainardi. He continued his studies at the Accademia Nazionale di Santa Cecilia, graduating in 1962. In 1963 he won a prize at the Pablo Casals International Violoncello Competition in Budapest.

In 1965 and 1966 he studied with Pablo Casals in Zermatt and Puerto Rico and afterward performed at the Marlboro Festival for four consecutive years. In 1974 he became a lecturer and in 1980 a professor at the Ferenc Liszt Academy of Music, but while teaching continued to perform internationally. He has been a regular guest of the Theatre de la Ville in Paris for solo works and chamber music performances.

== Discography ==
Perényi's work is available on recordings under the Hungaroton, Quint, Decca, Metropolitan Video and ECM New Series. Selected recordings include:

- Beethoven: Complete Music for Piano and Violoncello by Ludwig van Beethoven, Andras Schiff, and Miklos Perenyi (Audio CD - Sep 28, 2004)
- J.S. Bach/Miklos Perenyi: 6 Suites for Cello Solo - BWV 1007-1012 (DVD - Apr 25, 2006)
- Miklos Perenyi & Dénes Várjon by Perenyi, Varion, Bach, and Britten (Audio CD - Jun 1, 2010)
- Suite No.3 in C, BWV1009: Courante by Miklós Perényi & Dénes Várjon (MP3 Download - Jun 1, 2010)
- Haydn: Cello Concertos 1 & 2 by Miklos Perenyi, Franz Joseph Haydn, Franz Liszt Chamber Orchestra, and János Rolla (Audio CD - Jul 13, 2000)
- Sonata in C, Op.65: Scherzo - pizzicato by Miklós Perényi & Dénes Várjon (MP3 Download - Jun 1, 2010)
- The Instruments Of Classical Music: The Cello by Miklos Perenyi, Ludwig van Beethoven, Antonín Dvořák, and Benjamin Godard (Audio CD - Jun 4, 1990)
