= String Quartet No. 3 (Beethoven) =

String Quartet
- No. 3
- Early string quartet by Ludwig van Beethoven
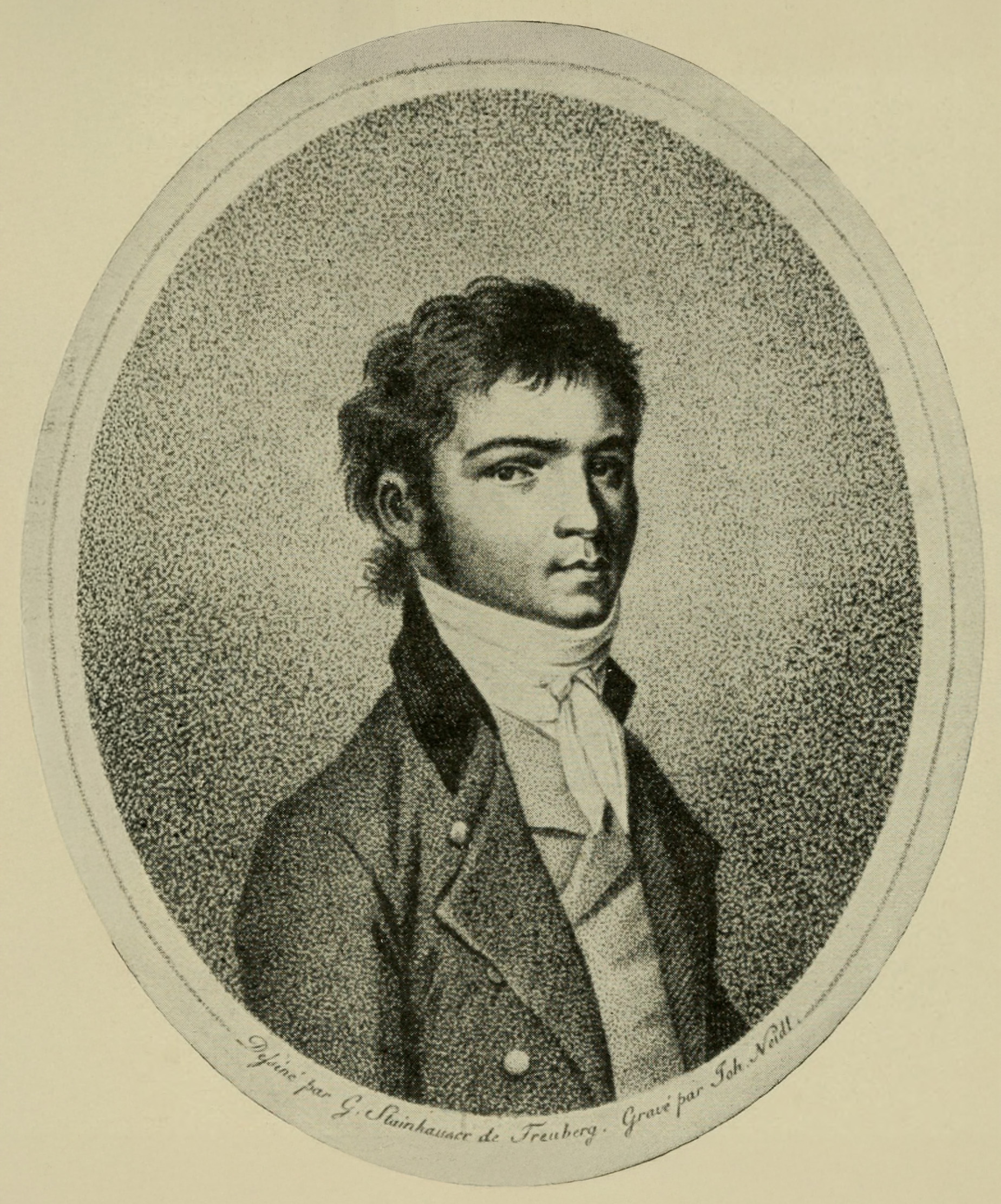
- Ludwig van Beethoven, c. 1796
- Key: D major
- Opus: 18, No. 3
- Composed: 1798–1800
- Dedication: Joseph Franz von Lobkowitz
- Published: 1801
- Duration: c. 25 min.
- Movements: Four

The String Quartet No. 3 in D major, Op. 18, No. 3, was written by Ludwig van Beethoven between 1798 and 1800 and published in 1801, dedicated to Joseph Franz von Lobkowitz. Although it is numbered third, it was the first quartet Beethoven composed.

== Analysis ==
It consists of four movements:

1. Allegro (D major)
2. Andante con moto (B♭ major)
3. Scherzo Allegro (D major) – Trio (D minor)
4. Presto (D major)

According to Michael Steinberg, this is "the gentlest, most consistently Minore & Maggiore lyrical work [within Beethoven's Op. 18]", except for the fourth movement, in which "Beethoven first explores the idea of shifting the centre of gravity toward the end of a multimovement work".

The first movement starts with a gentle and unassuming theme:

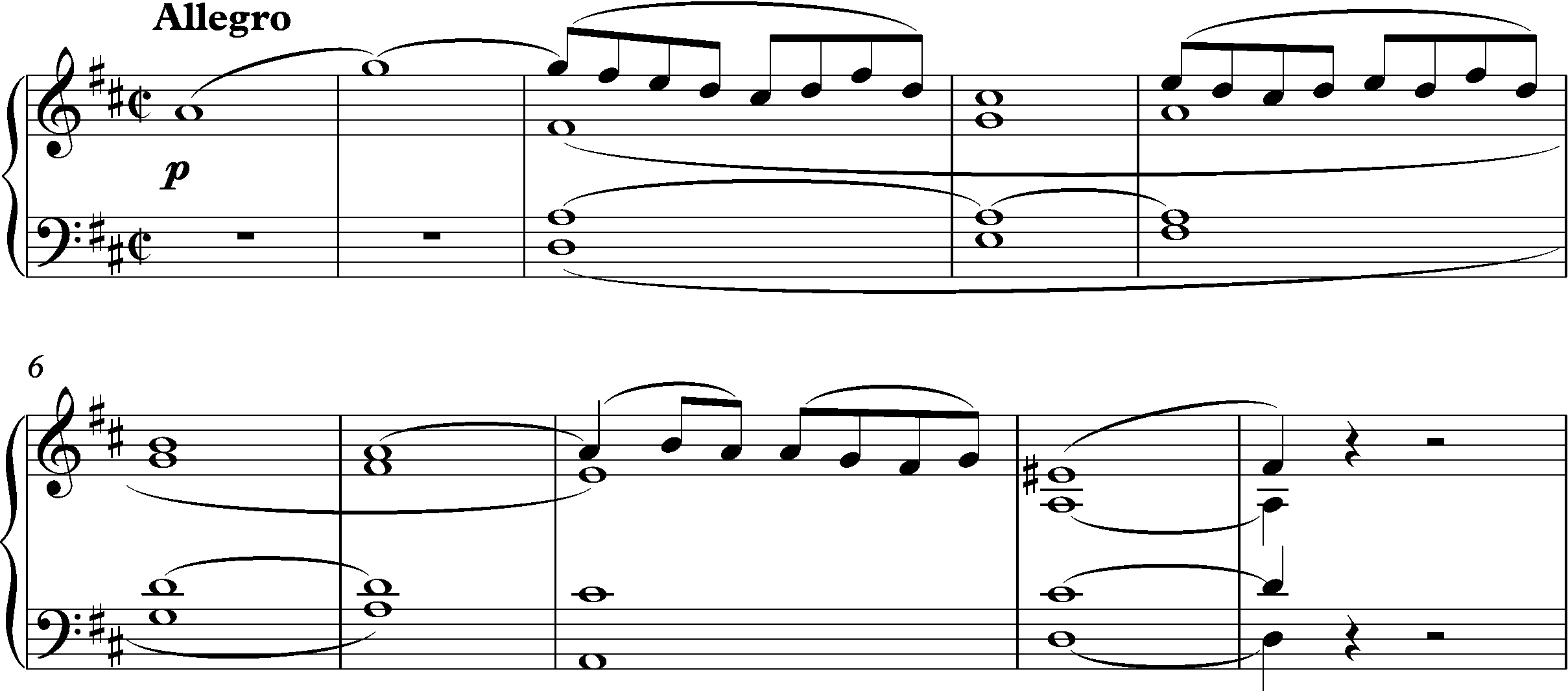
Beethoven Quartet, Op. 18 No. 3, opening

However, its return at the start of the recapitulation shows the theme in an entirely different light. Philip Radcliffe describes this moment as “beautifully contrived”. Burstein describes the dramatic and unusual harmonic progression at the end of the development section as “breathtaking”.

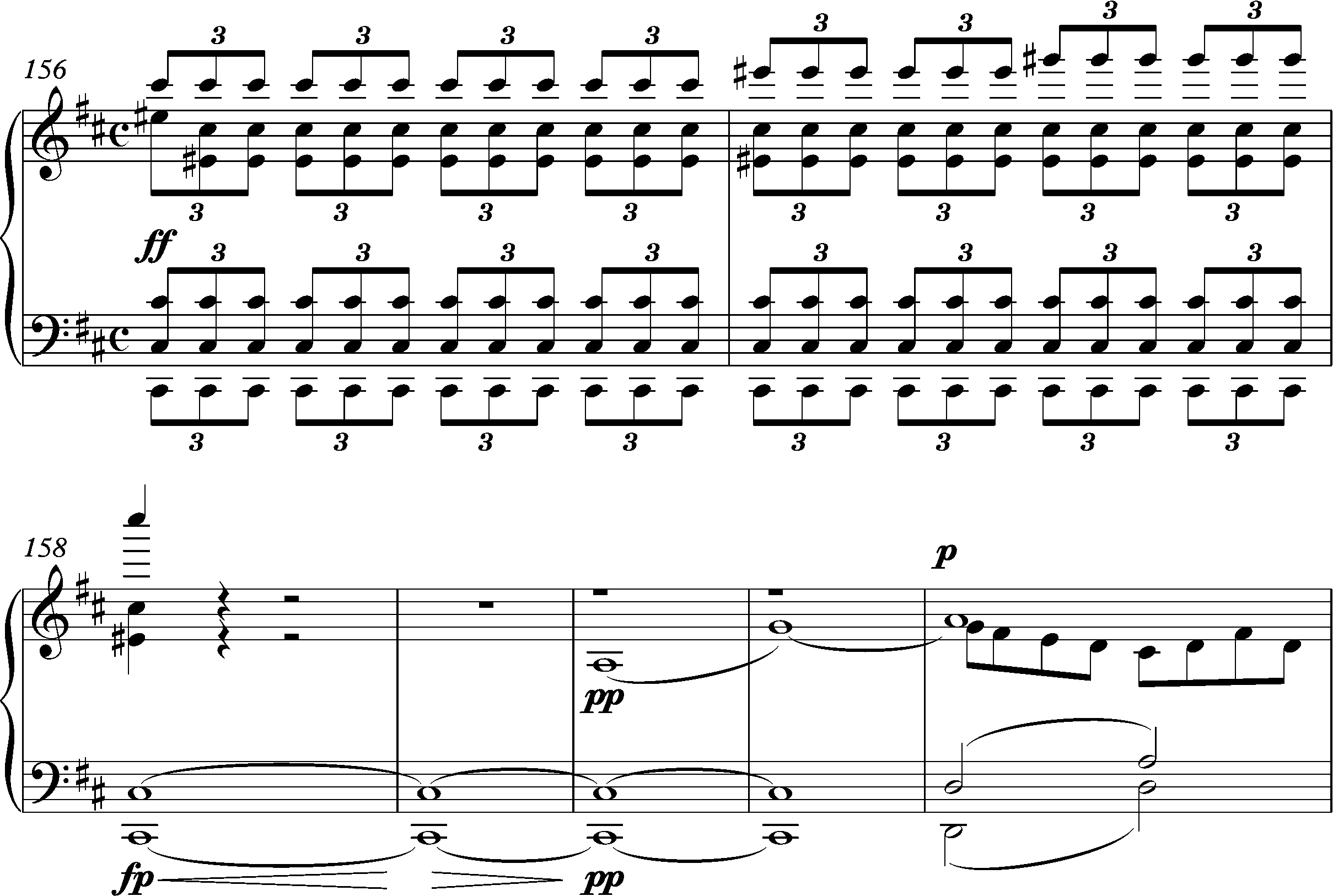
Beethoven Quartet Op. 18 No.3, first movement, bars 156–162

“The sudden reinterpretation of the C♯ creates a type of tonal crisis which has deep structural ramifications for the entire movement. Beethoven's brilliant manner of dealing with the implications of this unusual strategy indicates a debt to his teacher, Haydn, and also reveals much about Beethoven's own craft and artistic vision.”

== Sources ==
- Steinberg, Michael (1994). Winter, Robert; Martin, Robert (eds.). The Beethoven Quartet Companion. University of California Press. pp. 159–163. ISBN 0-520-08211-7.
