= String Quartet No. 8 (Beethoven) =

String Quartet
- No. 8
- Rasumovsky quartet by Ludwig van Beethoven
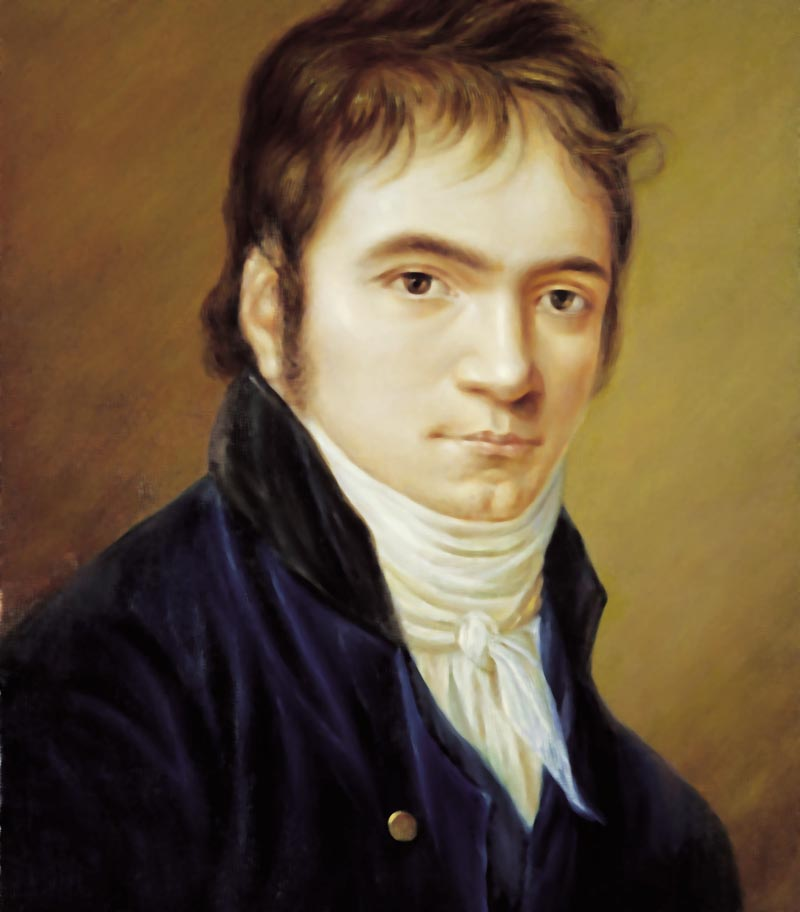
- Ludwig van Beethoven, 1803 portrait
- Key: E minor
- Opus: 59, No. 2
- Published: 1808
- Duration: c. 35 min.
- Movements: Four

The String Quartet No. 8 in E minor, Op. 59, No. 2, was written by Ludwig van Beethoven and published in 1808. This work is the second of three of his "Rasumovsky" cycle of string quartets, and is a product of his "middle" period.

== Music ==
It is in four movements:

1. Allegro, 6/8, E minor
2. Molto adagio (Si tratta questo pezzo con molto di sentimento),, E major
3. Allegretto (with the second section marked "Maggiore – Thème russe"), 3/4, E minor – E major – E minor
4. Finale. Presto,, C major – E minor

According to Carl Czerny, the second movement of the quartet occurred to Beethoven as he contemplated the starry sky and thought of the music of the spheres (Thayer, Life of Beethoven); it has a hymnlike quality reminiscent of a much later devotion, the Heiliger Dankgesang hymn to the Divine in the Quartet Op. 132.

The scherzo movement of the quartet, the third movement (allegretto), uses a Russian theme also used by Modest Mussorgsky in Boris Godunov, by Anton Arensky in his String Quartet No. 2 in A minor, by Pyotr Tchaikovsky in "Orchestral Interlude: The Battle of Poltava" from Mazeppa, and by Sergei Rachmaninoff in his 6 Morceaux for Piano Duet, Op. 11. The original song, "Glory to the Sun", was collected by Nikolay Lvov and Jan Prac; sheet music was published in 1790 (2nd ed., 1806), verses in the 1770s. However, Beethoven used it in an ungentle way. According to Joseph Kerman, "It sounds as though Count Razumovsky had been tactless enough to hand Beethoven the tune, and Beethoven is pile-driving it into the ground by way of revenge.". In an extremely unusual example of melodic setting prior to the 20th century, portions of the tune with strong tonic harmonic leanings are harmonized with the dominant, and vice versa; the harmonic clash is harsh, and many listeners have found this portion of the quartet to be quite amusing, especially as contrasted with the prosaic, almost "exercise-book" counterpoint which precedes it (another example of Beethoven parodying a student counterpoint exercise can be found in the scherzo of the Quartet No. 10, opus 74). According to Kyrylo Vadymovych Stetsenko the melody of the Ukrainian folk song "Vid Kyieva do Luben" ("From Kyiv to Lubny") can be heard.

Pianist Jonathan Biss, who is Neubauer Family Chair in Piano Studies at Curtis Institute of Music, has suggested that Opus 59 No. 2 is a proper analogue to – a “close cousin of” – Beethoven's Piano Sonata No. 23 in F minor, Op. 57 (“Appassionata”), in that both have a start-to-finish darkness. The two pieces were composed around the same time and Biss notes that although Beethoven wrote many pieces that begin in tragic mode, there are surprisingly few that end there as well. Both compositions also have an opening phrase that is repeated a 1/2 step higher.
