= Matteo Marchisano-Adamo =

American musician

- Born: February 19, 1973 (age 53); Flint, Michigan
- Occupations: Filmmaker, Film editor, Sound designer, Composer
- Years active: 2000 - present
- Spouse: Elena-Cristina Marchisano (m. 2008; div. 2018)

Matteo Marchisano-Adamo (born February 19, 1973) is an American filmmaker, sound designer, film editor, composer. He was born in Flint, Michigan.

== Biography ==
Matteo Marchisano-Adamo's mother is Sicilian and his father is from Buenos Aires, Argentina. As a child he studied ballet, eventually being offered a scholarship to study in New York City, which was never pursued. Marchisano-Adamo also played the violin as a child. As a teenager he studied piano with the Brazilian pianist Caio Pagano.

From 1991-1995 Marchisano-Adamo studied music at the Franz Liszt Academy of Music in Budapest, Hungary with Ferenc Rados. It was in Budapest that he discovered atonal, electronic music, and serial composition. György Kurtág, Steve Reich, and John Cage are some of his influences.

Returning to the U.S. he pursued other creative endeavors, including writing, filmmaking, and poetry. At the New School University in New York City he was mentored by the poet Sekou Sundiata. Attending many screenings at the Anthology Film Archives Marchisano-Adamo was introduced to the film work of Maya Deren and Luis Buñuel.

In Los Angeles, California Marchisano-Adamo attended the American Film Institute as a film editor where he worked with Frank Pierson, Danford Greene, and Frank Mazzola. In 2009 he was awarded best editing from the Europe Independent Film Festival.

He currently lives in Los Angeles, California.
