= Endre Hegedűs =

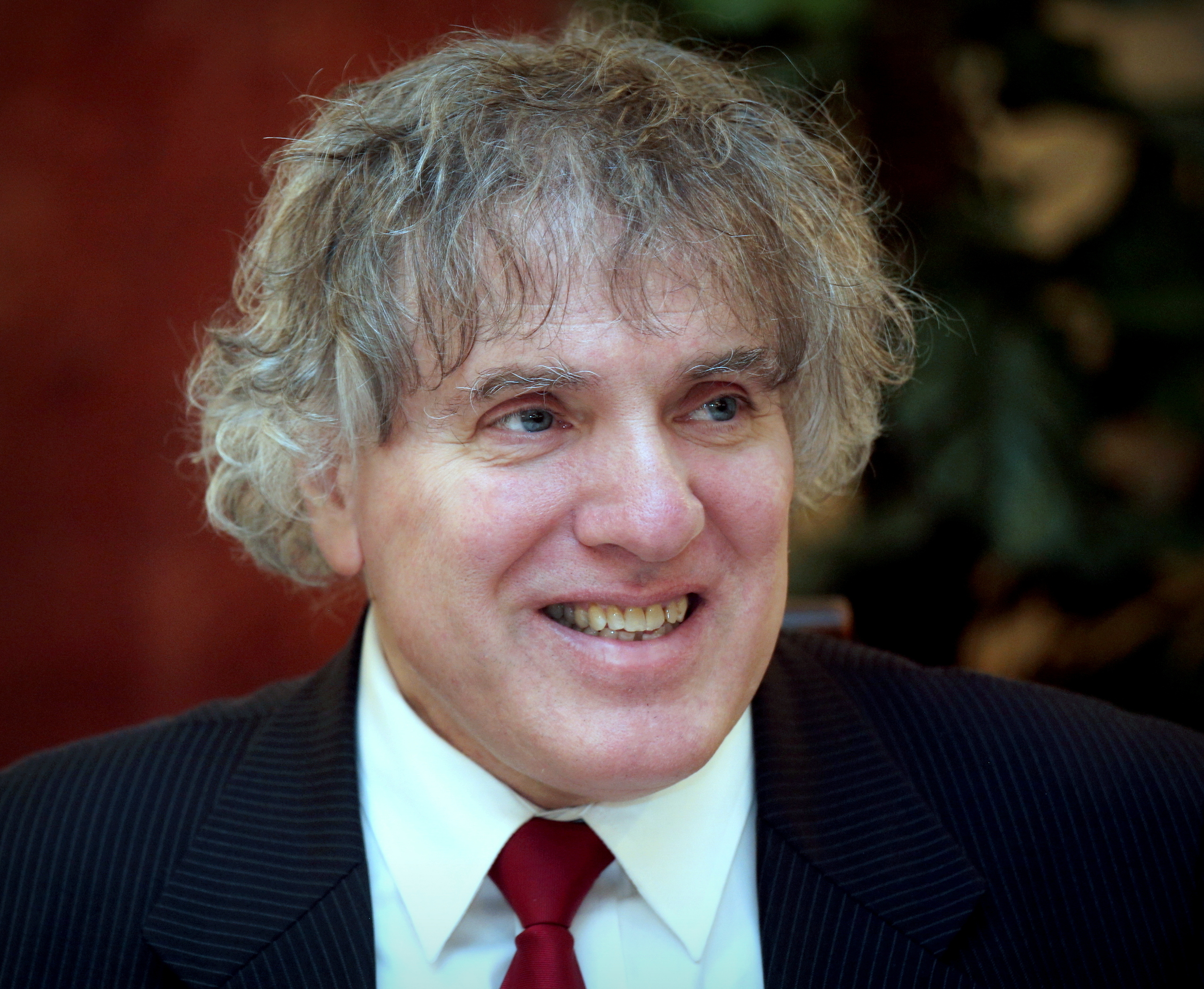
Endre Hegedűs in 2016

Endre Hegedűs (born 1954 in Hungary) is an internationally known piano soloist. He graduated from Franz Liszt Academy of Music as a pianist, both performing artist and teacher in 1980. Since 1999 he has been a professor of the Academy.

Hegedűs has participated in 20 international piano competitions and has won several prizes among them first prizes in Monza and at the Rachmaninov Competition in Morcone, both in Italy. During the Liszt Centennial Year in 1986 he was awarded the Franz Liszt Commemorative Plate of the Hungarian Ministry of Culture and the International Liszt Society for his outstanding interpretations of works by the great composer Franz Liszt.

He has recorded 27 albums under the labels Hungaroton, Marco Polo and Studio Liszt Productions. His album containing the complete Bellini-Liszt operatic fantasies published by the Hungaroton in 1993 received the Franz Liszt International Grand Prix du Disque from the International Liszt Society. Hungarian television companies made 12 films taken from his public concerts and transmitted them on various occasions. The total length of these films exceeds 18 hours.

In 1999 Hegedűs has been included into the roster of Steinway Artists by the Steinway Center in New York City. In Hungary in the year 2000 he was awarded the State Franz Liszt Prize. In 2004 the artist received from the hands of President Ferenc Mádl the Medal of Merit of the President of the Hungarian Republic - for his worldwide concert activities and for his abilities to create harmony between music and its audience. In the course of Mr. Hegedűs' 30 years of pianistic career he performed more than 2600 times on public appearances. Beside his live concert activities in his home-land, Hungary he regularly gives concerts in Australia, Austria, Bulgaria, Czech Republic, Finland, France, Germany, Greece, Italy, Japan, Norway, Poland, Russia, Slovakia, Switzerland, Yugoslavia, Canada and in the United States of America.

Hegedűs resides in Budapest, Hungary with his wife, Katalin (also a concert pianist). They have three children.
