= Ann Carr-Boyd =

Australian composer

Ann Carr-Boyd AM
- Born: 13 July 1938 (age 88); Sydney
- Education: University of Sydney
- Occupations: Composer, musicologist
- Father: Norbert Wentzel
- Relatives: Albert Wentzel (grandfather); Charles Wentzel (uncle)
- Awards: Albert H. Maggs Composition Award (1975)

Ann Kirsten Carr-Boyd AM (born 13 July 1938) is an Australian classical composer and musicologist. She is considered an authority on the history of European music in Australia.

== Biography ==
Ann Kirsten Wentzel was born in Sydney. Her grandfather Wentzel Albert (later changed to Albert Wentzel) came to Australia in 1888 from Bohemia, as a violinist with an orchestra helping to celebrate the centenary of European settlement. Her father Norbert Wentzel was her first teacher of piano and composition, and her uncle Charles Wentzel taught her the violin. Both her father and uncle played viola in the Sydney Symphony Orchestra.

Her formal music studies were at the University of Sydney, where in 1960, she was one of two students (the other was Norma Tyer) to graduate with a Bachelor of Music degree. Carr-Boyd then received the university's first Master of Arts in music. She also studied in London with Peter Racine Fricker and Alexander Goehr. She married and had children in London. She returned to Sydney in 1967, where she has been involved in broadcasting, teaching, and contributing to music lexicography, such as the Australian Dictionary of Biography and the Grove Dictionary of Music and Musicians.

In 1975 she won the Albert H. Maggs Composition Award. She was a co-founder of the Lane Cove Symphony Orchestra (now known as the Mosman Orchestra), and she and her three daughters play in the orchestra. One of her works was performed at the official opening of the New Parliament House, Canberra in 1988. She now lives in Moss Vale in the Southern Highlands of New South Wales. Her quasi-namesake and fellow Australian composer Anne Boyd is no relation.

== Music ==
Carr-Boyd's works encompass a symphony, concertos (piano; violin), chamber music and vocal music. The harpsichord figures prominently in her output, such as in Suite for Véronique.

She is perhaps best known to the general music-listening public for a short piece for mandolin ensemble, titled Fandango. It was nominated for the Most Performed Classical Composition at the 1999 APRA Awards, and it ranked 55 in the 2008 Classic 100 chamber survey conducted by ABC Classic FM radio.
