= String Quartets, Op. 18 (Beethoven) =

Set of six string quartets by Ludwig van Beethoven

Ludwig van Beethoven's Op. 18, published in 1801 by T. Mollo et Comp in Vienna in two books of three quartets each, comprised his first six string quartets. They were composed between 1798 and 1800 to fulfill a commission for Prince Joseph Franz Maximilian Lobkowitz, who was the employer of Beethoven's friend, the violinist Karl Amenda. They are thought to demonstrate his total mastery of the classical string quartet as developed by Joseph Haydn and Wolfgang Amadeus Mozart. The order of publication (numbering within the opus) does not correspond to the order of composition. Beethoven composed these quartets in the sequence 3, 1, 2, 5, 4, 6. See:

- String Quartet No. 1 in F major
- String Quartet No. 2 in G major
- String Quartet No. 3 in D major
- String Quartet No. 4 in C minor
- String Quartet No. 5 in A major
- String Quartet No. 6 in B♭ major

In an April 1802 letter to Hofmeister in Leipzig, Beethoven says the Mollo edition of nos. 4-6 is error-ridden ("has again, let us say, filled with faults and errata, great and small"), and Kerman makes a similar comment, leaving one to conclude that the poor Mollo edition of nos. 4-6, which incited private protests from the composer, may also be the best existing primary source for those three works, unless manuscripts or sketches for them have been discovered. This applies to nos. 4-6; the situation for no. 1, especially, is different, since an entire earlier version has been preserved, published and even recorded. While the overall set is less critically acclaimed than the "Razumovsky" quartets and the late quartets, op. 18, no. 1 has been perennially admired. It is noted for its unity, with 131 iterations of the opening motive in its 427 measures (by A. B. Marx's count).

== See also ==
- List of compositions by Ludwig van Beethoven
- Late String Quartets (Beethoven)
- String Quartets Nos. 7–9, Op. 59 – Rasumovsky (Beethoven)
