= String Quartet No. 1 (Beethoven) =

1800 string quartet by Ludwig van Beethoven

String Quartet
- No. 1
- Early string quartet by Ludwig van Beethoven
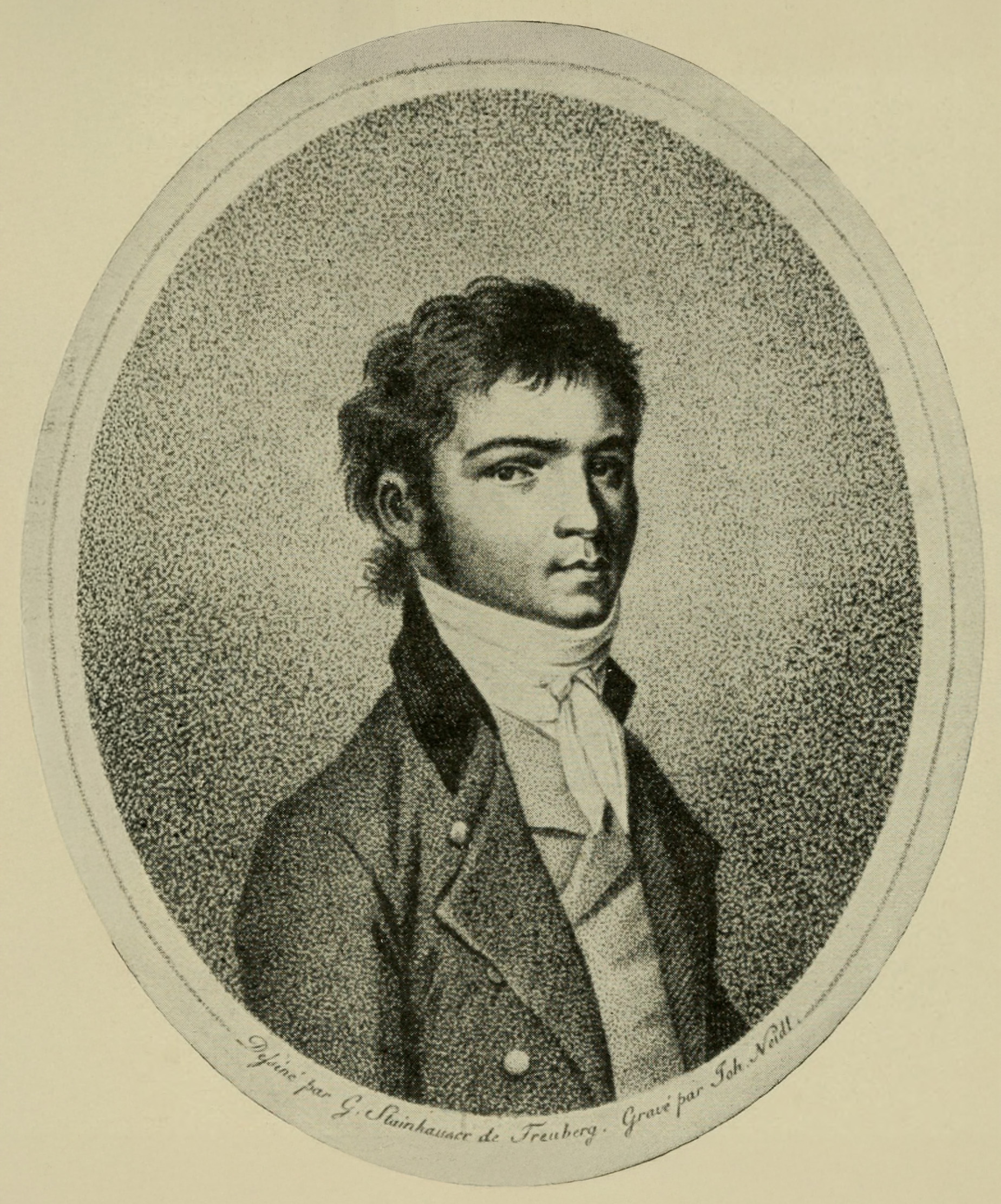
- Ludwig van Beethoven, c.1796
- Key: F major
- Opus: 18, No. 1
- Composed: 1798–1800
- Dedication: Joseph Franz von Lobkowitz
- Published: 1801
- Movements: Four

The String Quartet No. 1 in F major, Op. 18, No. 1, was written by Ludwig van Beethoven between 1798 and 1800, published in 1801. The complete set of six quartets was commissioned by and dedicated to the Bohemian aristocrat Joseph Franz von Lobkowitz. It is actually the second string quartet that Beethoven composed, following his third.

== Structure ==
The quartet consists of four movements:

1. Allegro con brio (F major)
2. Adagio affettuoso ed appassionato (D minor)
3. Scherzo: Allegro molto (F major) - Trio (B♭ major)
4. Allegro (F major)

The theme of the finale is almost directly borrowed from the finale of his earlier string trio, Op. 9, No. 3 in C minor; the themes are very closely related. The principal theme of the first movement echoes that of Mozart's Violin Sonata No. 32 K. 454 (1784) and Haydn's 1787 Opus 50, No. 1 quartet.

== History ==
According to Carl Amenda, Beethoven's friend, the second movement was inspired by the crypt scene from William Shakespeare's Romeo and Juliet. The quartet was heavily revised between the version that Amenda first received, and that was dedicated to him, and the one that was sent to the publisher a year later, including changing the second movement's marking from Adagio molto to the more specific Adagio affettuoso ed appassionato. Of these modifications, Beethoven wrote: "Be sure not to hand on to anybody your quartet, in which I have made some drastic alterations. For only now have I learnt to write quartets; and this you will notice, I fancy, when you receive them."

The "Amenda" manuscript, as it is sometimes known, was edited by Paul Mies and published by Bärenreiter around 1965, and by G. Henle Verlag of Munich (perhaps also edited by Mies) in 1962. This early version of one of Beethoven's best-known works has been recorded perhaps fewer than a half-dozen times as of July 2014.

== In popular culture ==
The second movement of the Juilliard String Quartet's recording is used in the soundtrack to the 2015 film The Lobster.

== Notes ==
=== Sources ===
- Sutcliffe, W. Dean (1992). Haydn: String Quartets, Op. 50. Cambridge: Cambridge University Press. ISBN 0521399955.
- Winter, Robert; Martin, Robert, eds. (1994). The Beethoven Quartet Companion. University of California Press. ISBN 0-520-08211-7. (Especially the essay by Michael Steinberg, pp. 150–155.)
