= String Quartet No. 9 (Beethoven) =

1808 composition by Ludwig van Beethoven

String Quartet
- No. 9
- Rasumovsky quartet by Ludwig van Beethoven
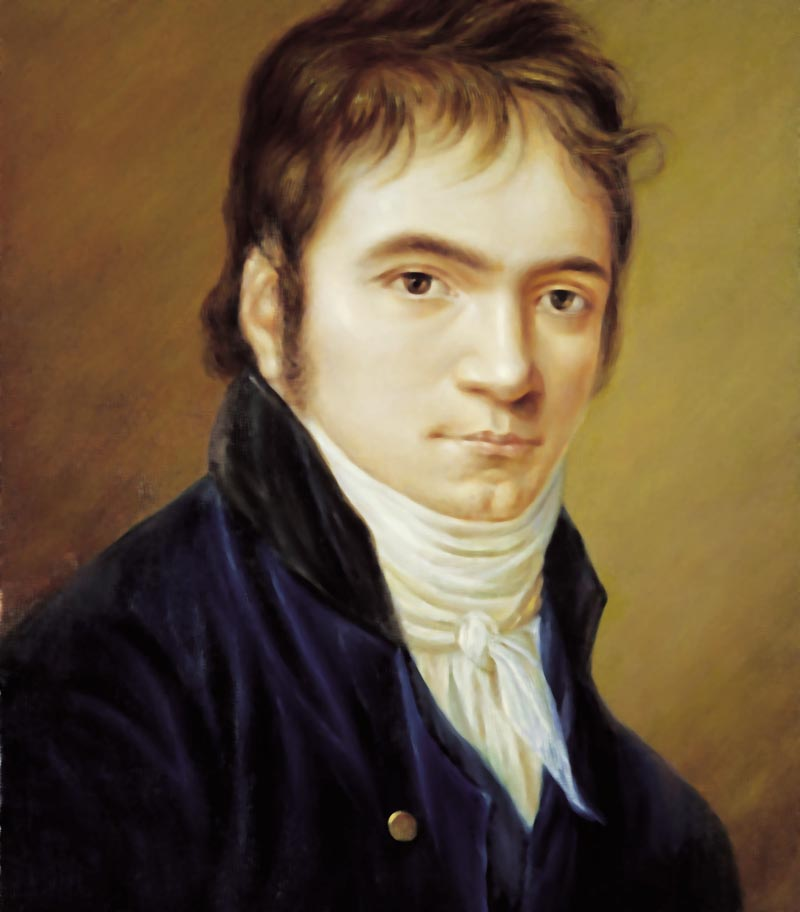
- Ludwig van Beethoven, 1803 portrait
- Key: C major
- Opus: 59, No. 3
- Published: 1808
- Duration: c. 30 min.
- Movements: Four

The String Quartet No. 9 in C major, Op. 59, No. 3, was written by Ludwig van Beethoven and published in 1808. This work is the third of three of his "Razumovsky" cycle of string quartets, and is a product of his "middle" period. It consists of four movements:

1. Andante con moto – Allegro vivace (C major)
2. Andante con moto quasi allegretto (A minor)
3. Menuetto (Grazioso) (C major)
4. Allegro molto (C major)

== Discussion ==
Part 3, 2nd movement

Part 4, 2nd movement
All of the above performed in 1933 by the Busch Quartet

The introductory andante con moto section of the first movement is not directly related to the rest of the movement and serves a similar function to the introduction of his Op. 74 quartet. Thereafter, the movement's main thematic material is exposed and developed. The relation (or apparent lack thereof) between the slow, sombre and dissonant introduction and the bright allegro which follows, is similar to what is found in Mozart's "Dissonance" Quartet, also in the key of C.

The quartet's second movement makes use of an augmented second in the descending scale first played by the first violin at the beginning of the movement. This interval, repeated through the movement, gives it an association with the Hungarian scale. Unlike the other two opus 59 quartets, this one does not have an explicit "Theme Russe" in any of its movements. Nevertheless, it can be argued that this second movement with its sparse texture and comfortless melodies, evokes a Russian feel by bringing to mind the vast, barren and desolate landscape of the Siberian tundra.

The quartet's third movement is a lighter menuetto which provides the motif that is subsequently turned upside down for the last movement, a fugal allegro molto that begins with the viola and adds the second violin, cello and first violin in that order. The movement is in alla breve time and is almost a perpetuum mobile in quavers. The fugue is semi-rigorous, somewhere between the fugato of Mozart's string quartet K.387 and the rigorous fugue of his Adagio and Fugue K.546. About halfway into the movement, a contrasting theme is introduced, which moves in minims. The movement concludes with an enormous Mannheim crescendo, peaking at an implicit fff.

== References and further reading ==
- Robert Hatten, "An Approach to Ambiguity in the Opening of Beethoven's 'String Quartet', Op. 59 no. 3, I," Indiana Theory Review Vol. 3, No. 3 (Spring, 1980): 28-35.
- Joseph Kerman, The Beethoven Quartets. New York, W.W. Norton & Co., 1966. ISBN 0-393-00909-2
- Vernon, David (2023). Beethoven: The String Quartets. Edinburgh: Candle Row Press. ISBN 978-1739659929. pp.95-146
