= Michael Steinberg (music critic) =

American music critic and author (1928-2009)

- Born: Carl Michael Alfred Steinberg; October 4, 1928; Breslau, Germany (now Wrocław, Poland)
- Died: 26 July 2009 (aged 80); Edina, Minnesota, US
- Education: Princeton University
- Occupation: Music critic
- Notable credits: The Boston Globe; San Francisco Symphony

Carl Michael Alfred Steinberg (4 October 1928 – 26 July 2009) was an American music critic and author who specialized in classical music. He was best known, according to San Francisco Chronicle music critic Joshua Kosman, for "the illuminating, witty and often deeply personal notes he wrote for the San Francisco Symphony's program booklets, beginning in 1979." He contributed several entries to the New Grove Dictionary of Music and Musicians, wrote articles for music journals and magazine, notes for CDs, and published a number of books on music, both collected published annotations and new writings.

== Life and career ==
Carl Michael Alfred Steinberg was born in Breslau, Germany (now Wrocław, Poland), on 4 October 1928. In 1939, Steinberg was among the 10,000 child refugees transported out of Germany via the Kindertransport; he and his mother settled in England. The two stayed with a family in Stapleford, Cambridgeshire, an assignment organized by the Quakers, and attended The Perse School. After four years in England, Steinberg and his mother joined the eldest brother Franz in St. Louis, US. Steinberg attended Princeton University, where his roommate was the future classical-music scholar and pianist Charles Rosen, graduating with a Bachelor of Arts in 1949.

He then received a Masters in Musicology from Princeton, after study with Oliver Strunk (musicology), Edward T. Cone and Milton Babbitt (theory) as well as the composer Bohuslav Martinů. After Princeton, he lived two years in Italy on a Fulbright scholarship, followed by a two-year stint in Germany with the U.S. Army. Once this posting ended, he became a faculty member of the Manhattan School of Music, where he taught music history.

Steinberg taught at several colleges in New York and Massachusetts before he became music critic for the Boston Globe in 1964. His time with the Globe was not without controversy. While Steinberg was lauded for his writing, the high standards by which he gauged the performances he reviewed caused friction with the Boston Symphony Orchestra. At one time, the orchestra's members voted to ban Steinberg from attending its concerts. However, after almost 12 years with the Globe, he became program annotator for this orchestra. In 1979, he worked as publications director and artistic advisor for the San Francisco Symphony; he stayed until 1989. He was program annotator for a number of other orchestras during his career, including the New York Philharmonic and the Minnesota Orchestra, the latter of which he served as artistic advisor during the 1990s.

In a 1995 interview with the San Francisco Chronicle, Steinberg said he saw his role as a critic and annotator as someone "building bridges and helping to create contact between listeners—nonprofessional listeners for the most part—and music."

Steinberg died in Edina, Minnesota, at the age of 80.

== Selected publications ==
=== Books ===
- Steinberg, Michael; Hadley, Benjamin; Gelles, George, eds. (1980). Britannica Book of Music. New York: Doubleday. ISBN 978-0-385-14191-8.
- —— (1995). The Symphony. Oxford: Oxford University Press. ISBN 978-0-19-506177-2.
- —— (1998). The Concerto. Oxford: Oxford University Press. ISBN 978-0-19-510330-4.
- —— (2005). Choral Masterworks: A Listener's Guide. Oxford: Oxford University Press. ISBN 978-0-19-802921-2.
- ——; Rothe, Larry (2006). For The Love of Music: Invitations to Listening. New York: Oxford University Press. ISBN 978-0-19-537020-1.

=== Grove articles ===
Grove Music Online. Oxford: Oxford University Press. 2001 (subscription, Wikilibrary access, or UK public library membership required)

- —— (2001). "Babin, Victor". Grove Music Online. doi:10.1093/gmo/9781561592630.article.01649.
- —— (2001). "Cliburn, Van". Grove Music Online. doi:10.1093/gmo/9781561592630.article.05963.
- —— (2001). "Dunn, Thomas". Grove Music Online. doi:10.1093/gmo/9781561592630.article.08329.
- —— (2001). "Firkušný, Rudolf". Firkušný, Rudolf. Grove Music Online. doi:10.1093/gmo/9781561592630.article.09710.
- —— (2001). "Fizdale, Robert". Grove Music Online. Revised by Ruth B. Hilton. doi:10.1093/gmo/9781561592630.article.09767.
- Steinberg, Michael (2001). "Foster, Lawrence". Grove Music Online. doi:10.1093/gmo/9781561592630.article.50019.
- —— (2001). "Freire [Pinto Freire], Nelson". Freire [Pinto Freire], Nelson. Grove Music Online. doi:10.1093/gmo/9781561592630.article.10196. ISBN 978-1-56159-263-0.
- —— (2001). "Frank, Claude". Frank, Claude. Grove Music Online. doi:10.1093/gmo/9781561592630.article.10145.
- —— (2001). "Janis [Yanks, Yankelevitch], Byron". Janis [Yanks, Yankelevitch], Byron. Grove Music Online. doi:10.1093/gmo/9781561592630.article.14132. ISBN 978-1-56159-263-0.
- —— (2001). "Mester, Jorge". Grove Music Online. Revised by Charles Barber. doi:10.1093/gmo/9781561592630.article.18500.
- —— (2001). "Ohlsson, Garrick". Grove Music Online. doi:10.1093/gmo/9781561592630.article.50075.
- —— (2004). "Istomin, Eugene". Istomin, Eugene. Grove Music Online. Revised by Dennis K. McIntire. doi:10.1093/gmo/9781561592630.article.13965.
- —— (2013). "Balsam, Artur". Grove Music Online. Revised by Anya Laurence. doi:10.1093/gmo/9781561592630.article.A2248227.
- —— (2013). "Castleman, Charles". Grove Music Online. Revised by Katie Buehner. doi:10.1093/gmo/9781561592630.article.A2248818.
- —— (2013). "Fleisher, Leon". Fleisher, Leon. Grove Music Online. Revised by Dennis K. McIntire and Rebecca Schwartz-Bishir. doi:10.1093/gmo/9781561592630.article.A2249568. ISBN 978-1-56159-263-0.
- —— (2013). "Frager, Malcolm". Frager, Malcolm. Grove Music Online. doi:10.1093/gmo/9781561592630.article.A2219061.
- —— (2013). "Goldsand, Robert". Goldsand, Robert. Grove Music Online. doi:10.1093/gmo/9781561592630.article.A2282985.
- —— (2013). "Prausnitz, Frederik". Grove Music Online. Revised by Greg A Steinke. doi:10.1093/gmo/9781561592630.article.A2292772.
- —— (2013). "Shaw, Robert". Shaw, Robert. Grove Music Online. Revised by Dennis K. McIntire and Steven M. Demorest. doi:10.1093/gmo/9781561592630.article.A2258253. ISBN 978-1-56159-263-0.
