= String Quartet No. 6 (Beethoven) =

Composition by Ludwig van Beethoven

String Quartet
- No. 6
- Early string quartet by Ludwig van Beethoven
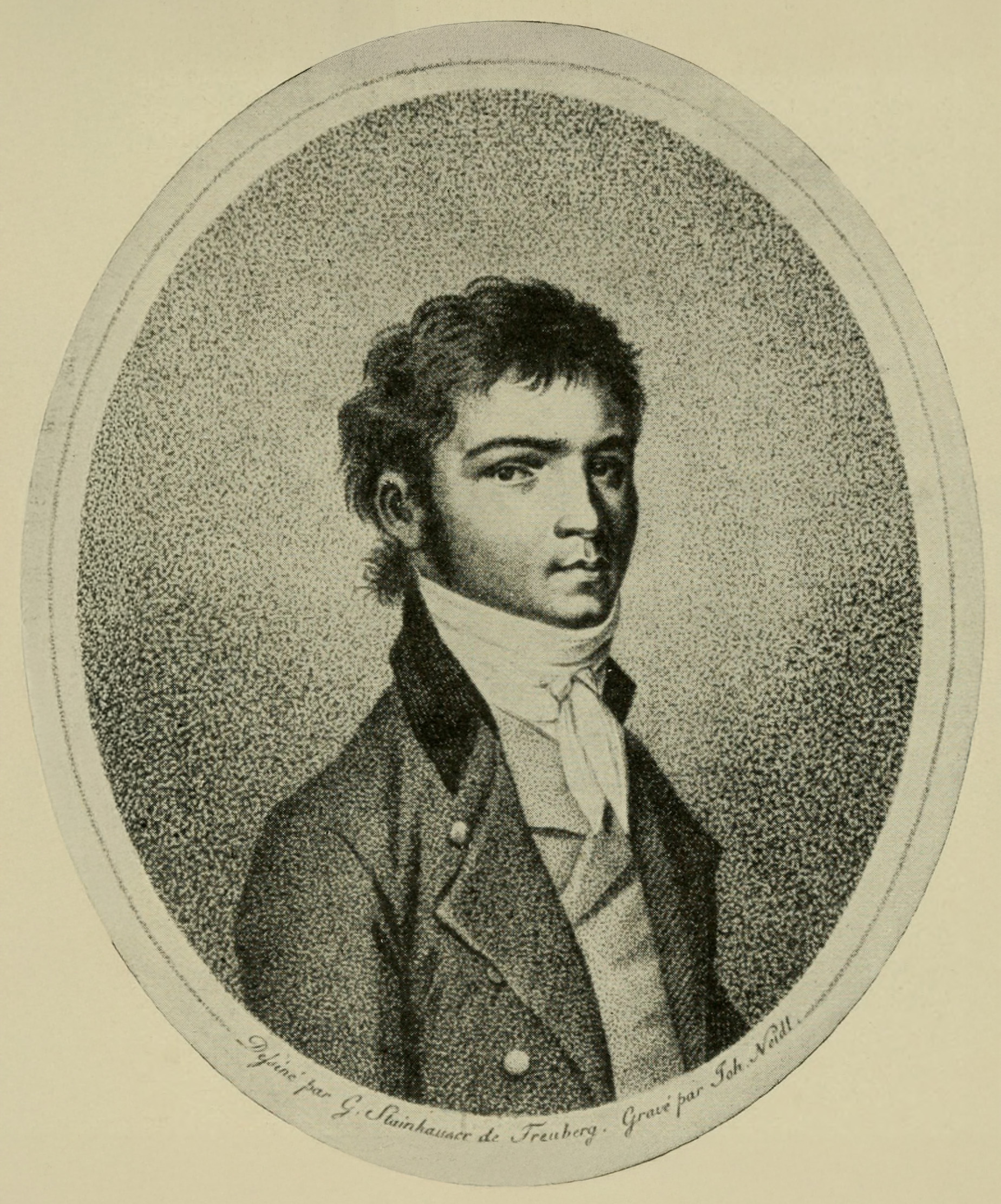
- Ludwig van Beethoven, c. 1796
- Key: B♭ major
- Opus: 18, No. 6
- Composed: 1798–1800
- Dedication: Joseph Franz von Lobkowitz
- Published: 1801
- Duration: c. 25 min.
- Movements: Four

The String Quartet No. 6 in B♭ major, Op. 18, No. 6, was written between 1798 and 1800 by Ludwig van Beethoven and published in 1801, and dedicated to Joseph Franz von Lobkowitz.

== Music ==
I. Allegro con brio (4:41)

II. Adagio ma non troppo (7:02)

III. Scherzo: Allegro (4:13)

IV. La Malinconia: Adagio - Allegretto quasi Allegro (8:13)

The quartet is in four movements:

1. Allegro con brio
2. Adagio ma non troppo (E♭ major)
3. Scherzo: Allegro - Trio
4. La Malinconia: Adagio – Allegretto quasi Allegro - adagio - Allegretto - Un poco adagio - Prestissimo

=== I. Allegro con brio ===
This work begins with a sonata form. The first theme starts in B♭ major with a conversation between the first violin and the cello. After a little bit of back and forth, the second violin takes over the conversation from the cello. Then the piece modulates to the dominant of F major and then F minor for the second theme. After a repeat of the first and second themes, the development section starts in F major. It then shifts to D major and on to G minor and eventually returns to F major before shifting to B♭ for the recapitulation. This time around the second theme stays in B♭.

=== II. Adagio ma non troppo ===
The second movement is in E♭ major and starts with the first violin playing a lyrical melody in 2/4 time. The mood shifts with the move to a minor key and unexpected accents and silences. The viola and cello interject with an odd motif marked "queste note ben marcato".

=== III. Scherzo: Allegro – Trio ===
The scherzo returns to B♭ major and is a "tour de force of syncopation" and "an explosion of rhythmic eccentricity". "It depends on rhythmic effects of 3 x 2 as against 2 x 3 within the 6 eight-notes to the bar in a moderate 3/4 meter."

=== IV. La Malinconia ===
The fourth movement is the crux of the piece and possibly the highlight of Op. 18. It is marked "Questo pezzo si deve trattare colla più gran delicatezza" ("This piece is to be played with the greatest delicacy".). The first section, in 2/4 time is marked Adagio and on one reading matches the "Melancholy" of the title. The second section marked "Allegretto quasi allegro" is in 3/8 time and is more sanguine. It is a fast and simple evocation of a Viennese ballroom or German country dance. This proceeds in contrast to the first section but eventually grinds to a halt on a fortissimo diminished chord. There follows a brief return of section 1 (10 bars) followed by a briefer return of section 2 (5 bars) (in A minor) followed by an ever briefer return of section 1 (only 2 bars).

This is followed by section 3, which is really a lengthier return of section 2, which starts in G and moves back to B♭. A similar procedure can be found in Beethoven's piano concerto Op. 19 in the same key. In the last movement, the A section returns in G major rather than B♭ and modulates back to B♭ via the same chord progression as in this quartet. Also, the main themes of the movements share the same initial pulse (short note on the first beat followed by a longer accentuated note on the second beat in a triple metre).

== References and further reading ==
- Johnson, Douglas (Autumn 1970). "Beethoven's Sketches for the Scherzo of the Quartet Op. 18, No. 6". Journal of the American Musicological Society. 23 (3): 385–404. doi:10.2307/830612.
- The Beethoven Quartets, Joseph Kerman. New York, W.W. Norton & Co., 1966. ISBN 0-393-00909-2
- Beethoven The Music and The Life, Lewis Lockwood. New York, W.W. Norton & Co., 2003
- The Beethoven Quartet Companion, edited by Robert Winter and Robert Martin. (1994: University of California Press)
