= Ferenc Rados =

Hungarian pianist and academic (1934–2025)

- Ferenc Rados, c. 2018
- Born: 26 October 1934; Budapest, Hungary
- Died: 25 February 2025 (aged 90)
- Education: Franz Liszt Academy of Music
- Occupations: Pianist; Academic teacher
- Organizations: Franz Liszt Academy of Music
- Awards: Hungarian Order of Merit; Kossuth Prize

Ferenc Rados (26 October 1934 – 25 February 2025) was a Hungarian pianist who performed internationally as recitalist, chamber musician and soloist with orchestras. He was professor of piano and chamber music at the Franz Liszt Academy of Music from the 1960s until 1996 where he shaped the careers of a generation of students, including Kirill Gerstein and András Schiff.

== Life and career ==
Rados was born in Budapest on 26 October 1934, the son of violinist Dezső Rados who was known as a violin teacher. The boy attended the Béla Bartók Vocational School as a student of pianist István Antal from 1952 to 1956. He studied piano at the Franz Liszt Academy of Music with Pál Kadosa from 1956 to 1959. He studied further with Victor Merzhanov at the Moscow Conservatory.

He played concerts first in Hungary, then internationally, as recitalist, chamber musician and as soloist with orchestras. He performed popular concerts for two pianos or four-hand piano with Zoltán Kocsis, one of his students. He also played Historically informed performances on Fortepianos. He stopped giving concerts in the late 1980s. Rados made many recordings with Hungaroton and for Magyar Rádió. He recorded works by Mozart for piano four hands with his former student Kirill Gerstein.

Rados began to teach in 1964 at the Bartók Music School. He lectured at the academy first as Kadosa's assistant, and then was appointed professor of piano and chamber music, shaping the careers of notable students. His student András Schiff described his lessons in interviews: "There was never a positive word from him. Everything was bad, horrible. But it instilled a healthy attitude, an element of doubt." He said that he learned from Rados "the main elements of piano playing, tone production, and self-control; how to listen to [oneself] and how to practise well, without wasting time, always musically, never mechanically". His students also included Gerstein, Kocsis, the pianist Dezső Ránki,Andres Carciente and the composer and filmmaker Matteo Marchisano-Adamo.

Rados also advised musicians, chamber ensembles and orchestras. After he retired from the academy in 1996, he gave master classes in Europe and Asia. He taught as professor at the Kronberg Academy from 2018.

Rados received the Hungarian State Award in 1980, the Bartók Pásztory Award in 1997, the Knight's Cross of the Hungarian Order of Merit in 2004, and the Kossuth Prize in 2010.

Rados died after a serious illness on 25 February 2025, at the age of 90.
