= String Quartet No. 4 (Beethoven) =

1800 composition by Ludwig van Beethoven

String Quartet
- No. 4
- Early string quartet by Ludwig van Beethoven
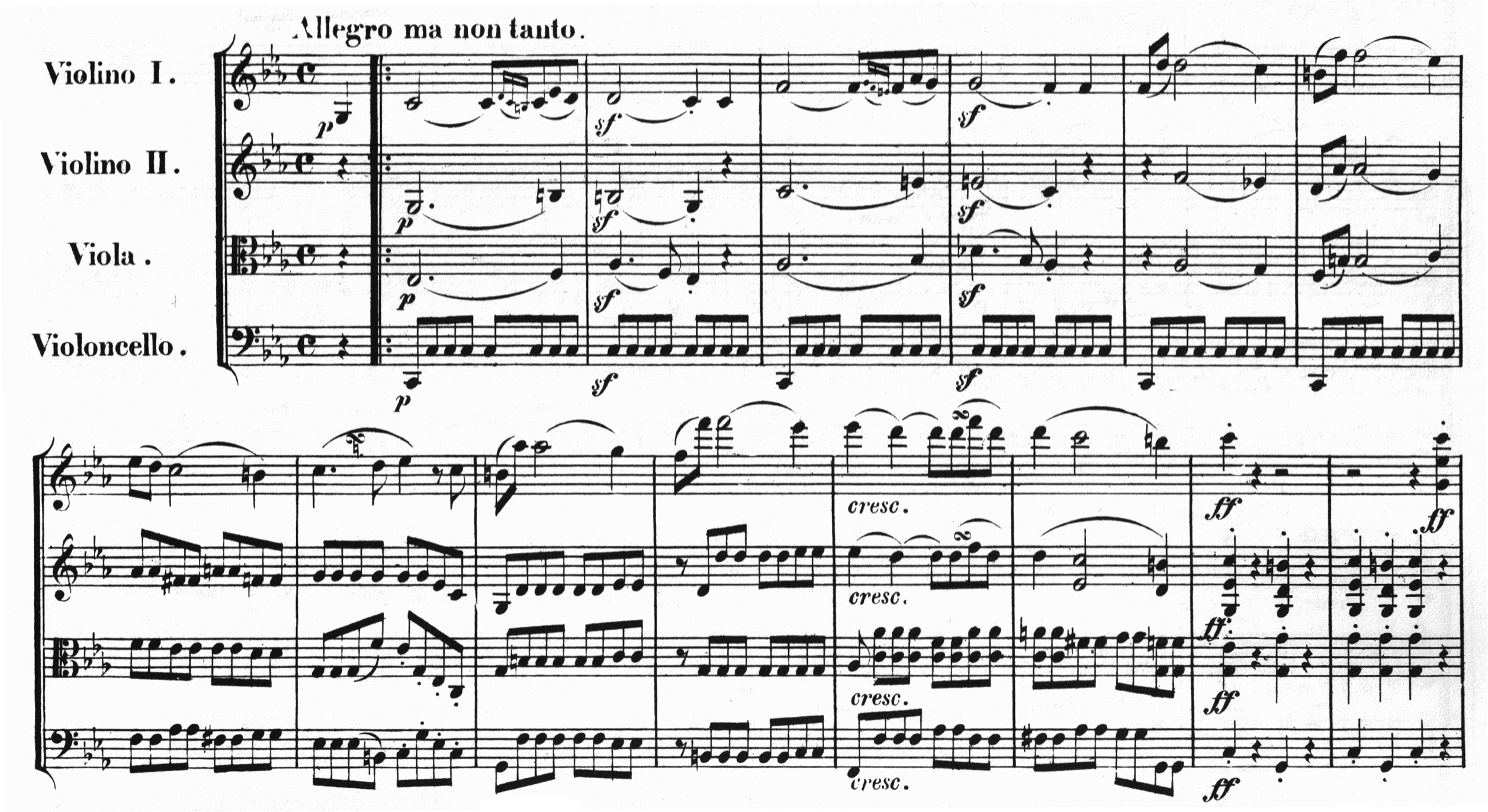
- The opening bars of the first movement from a 19th-century publication
- Key: C minor
- Opus: 18, No. 4
- Composed: 1798–1800
- Dedication: Joseph Franz von Lobkowitz
- Published: 1801
- Duration: c. 21 minutes
- Movements: Four

Ludwig van Beethoven composed his String Quartet No. 4 in C minor, Op. 18, No. 4, between 1798 and 1800 in Vienna and published in 1801. The Op. 18 collection is dedicated to Joseph Franz von Lobkowitz.

== Overview ==
The Op. 18 collection is sometimes difficult to study historically because the manuscripts no longer exist and much about them is conjecture or guesses. The fourth quartet is unique in the set in that there is no evidence that sketches or drafts of this quartet can be found. He would often draw upon earlier works when looking for inspiration, keeping journals of sketches and notes. For this reason, it may have been the last to have been composed. The key of the piece, C minor, is the only minor key in the set. This key used in other compositions of Beethoven's, such as Piano Sonata No. 8 in C minor, Op. 13 "Sonata Pathetique" and Symphony No. 5 in C minor, Op. 67. These pieces are similar in their level of intensity and stormy mood, a characteristic which seems to be a partial product of Beethoven's use of C minor in compositions.

== Movements ==
As with all of the Op. 18 quartets, the String Quartet No. 4 follows the four-movement format. The second movement is a fugal scherzo rather than the more typical slow movement.

=== I. Allegro ma non tanto (C minor) ===
The movement is in sonata form. It begins softly, but urgently, with ostinato eighth notes in the cello, while the first violin climbs ever higher through a series of leaps. This first subject culminates as the transition takes over in m. 13 with alternating tonic and dominant chords between the first violin and the other three instruments. The second subject is delayed, but enters at m. 33. It expands on the same rhythmic figure present in mm. 5 to 7. The development starts at m. 76. The recapitulation is from mm. 136 to 202 followed by a coda starting in m. 202. The first movement contains one clear relationship to another piece by Beethoven, his "mit zwei obligaten Augengläsern" (Duet for a Pair of Obbligato Eyeglasses) for viola and cello.

=== II. Andante scherzoso quasi allegretto (C major) ===
This movement replaces what would normally be a slow movement in traditional classical movement structure with a scherzo fugue. Like the first movement, it is in sonata form. In the beginning of the movement the second violin begins the piece, followed by the viola in m. 6, the first violin in m. 10, and the cello in m. 13. The first subject is from mm. 1 to 42, but is divided into two sections. In m. 33, a transition takes place until m. 42, where the second subject begins. M. 83 marks the beginning of the development section which begins with more fugal motives before transitioning into a chordal, then a fugal chordal section, and finally a recapitulation is reached at m. 147. This movement showcases Beethoven's composition skills through the use of counterpoint and polyphony.

=== III. Menuetto: Allegretto (C minor) – Trio (E♭ major) ===
This movement is a minuet with trio. In contrast with more delicate minuets of the era, this one is more serious in nature. The sforzandos placed on the 16th note of the dotted figure gives the open an almost unbalanced or off-kilter feeling. The trio is distinctive for its reversing of primary voices. The first violin plays a more accompanimental role of constant triplet eighth notes while the second violin and viola trade the melody in a call-and-response motive.

=== IV. Allegro – Prestissimo (C minor) ===
This movement is in rondo form. The principal subject lasts through the first 16 measures. There is a fermata in m. 12 preceded by a leap approached in contrary motion by the first violin and viola that presents itself as a question-like gesture that is then answered with a phrase similar to the opening consequent, ending on a unison C by means of a cadence. This resolution, with its absence of a third leads to slight ambiguity in key, which is taken advantage of later in the piece. The attempted modulation from C minor to C major is a constant source of development, only reaching its full climax in the prestissimo coda from m. 163 to the end.
