= Sándor Falvai =

Hungarian pianist

Sándor Falvai (born in Ózd, 1949) is a Hungarian pianist.

Falvai graduated in 1972 at the Ferenc Liszt Academy of Music, where he was appointed a teacher after spending a year at the Moscow Conservatory. He has performed and recorded internationally, and served as soloist for the Budapest Symphony Orchestra in concert tours.
