= String Quartet No. 7 (Beethoven) =

1808 string quartet by Ludwig van Beethoven

String Quartet
- No. 7
- Rasumovsky quartet by Ludwig van Beethoven
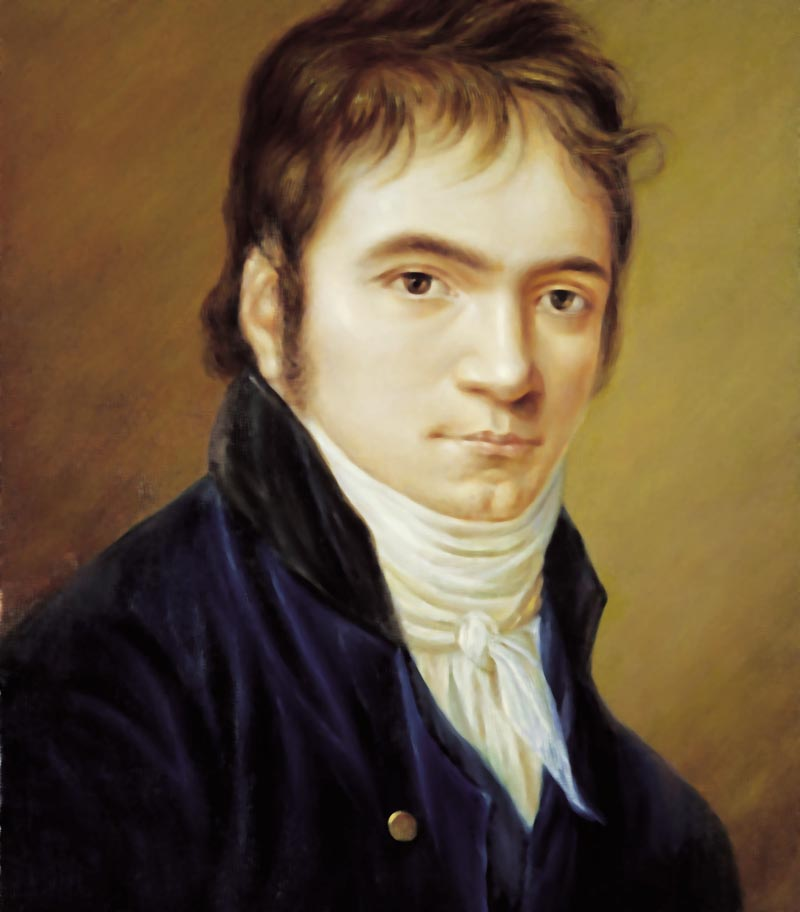
- Ludwig van Beethoven, 1803 portrait
- Key: F major
- Opus: 59, No. 1
- Published: 1808
- Duration: c. 40 min.
- Movements: Four

The String Quartet No. 7 in F major, Op. 59, No. 1, was written by Ludwig van Beethoven and published in 1808. This work is the first of three of his "Rasumovsky" cycle of string quartets.

== Overview ==
This work is the first of three quartets commissioned by prince Andrey Razumovsky, then the Russian ambassador to Vienna. This quartet is the first of Beethoven's middle period quartets and departs in style from his earlier Op. 18 quartets. The most apparent difference is that this quartet is over forty minutes long in a typical performance, whereas most of Beethoven's earlier quartets lasted twenty-five to thirty minutes. Furthermore, this quartet notoriously requires a greatly expanded technical repertoire.

== Form ==
It consists of four movements:

1. Allegro (F major)
2. Allegretto vivace e sempre scherzando (B♭ major)
3. Adagio molto e mesto - attacca (F minor)
4. "Thème Russe": Allegro (F major)

The first movement is in an expansive sonata form, including a fugato in the development and lasting nearly twelve minutes even though it forgoes the then-customary repeat of the exposition. The opening cello melody has its tonality only weakly defined, with the first cadence establishing the key of F major only occurring several bars into the movement.

Another feature of the first movement is the delayed emotional recapitulation. As became one of Beethoven's many tools for emotional manipulation, delaying the grandiosity of the recapitulation for several bars after the establishment of the tonic key allowed Beethoven to heighten expectation of a definitive statement.

While both the majestic, slow third movement and the fourth (between which there is no break) are also in sonata form, the second movement scherzo is formally one of the most unusual movements of Beethoven's middle period, easily classifiable as being also in sonata form.

The final movement is built around a popular Russian theme, likely an attempt to ingratiate the work to its Russian commissioner. According to the Ukrainian violinist, composer and musicologist Kyrylo Vadymovych Stetsenko Beethoven used the melody of the Ukrainian folk song "Oi, na dvori metelytsia" ("Oh, there's a snowstorm outside").
