= Potemkin (surname) =

Potemkin (Russian: Потёмкин, Potyomkin; or Potyomkina/Potemkina Feminine; Потёмкина) is a Russian surname which derives from the word Потёмка Potyomka meaning "dark". Persons bearing the name Potemkin rose to prominence in Muscovy from the 16th century onwards. Notable people with the surname include:

- Alexander Potemkin (1675–1746), Russian nobleman, father of Grigory.
- Alexandr Mikhailovich Potemkin (1787—1872), Russian nobleman and army officer.
- Grigory Potemkin (1739–1791), statesman and paramour of Czarina Catherina.
- Károly Potemkin (born 1977), Hungarian football player.
- Pavel Potemkin (1743–1796), Russian diplomat and military commander, cousin of Grigory Potemkin.
- Peter Potemkin (1886–1926), Russian chess master.
- Pyotr Potemkin (1617–1700), Russian diplomat and voivode.
- Tatiana Borisovna Potemkina (1797—1869), Russian noblewoman and philanthropist.
- Valeriya Reznik (born Valeriya Potemkina during 1985), Russian short-track speed-skater.
- Vladimir Potemkin (1874–1946), Soviet Russian diplomatic and academic

== See also ==
- Potemkin (disambiguation)
