= Temkin =

Temkin, Tyomkin, or Tiomkin (feminine: Temkina, Tyomkina, Temkina, or Tiomkina) are different transliterations of a Russian-language surname Тёмкин/Тёмкина.

In at least in one case – Elizabeth Temkina – the surname is the truncation of the surname Potemkin, which was sometimes done when naming illegitimate children of aristocrats in the Russian Empire.

As a Jewish surname, it can me a matronymic surname derived from the diminutive (see Jewish surnames#Ashkenazi Jewish communities) "Temka" (טֶמֶקֶה) of the feminine name "Tema" (טֶמֶה).

Notable people with the surname include:

- Aaron Temkin Beck (1921–2021), American psychiatrist
- Ann Temkin, American art curator
- Binyamin Temkin (born 1945), Israeli politician
- Brad Temkin, American photographer
- Deborah Temkin (born 1985), American child development scientist
- Dimitri Tiomkin (1894–1979), Russian and American film composer and conductor
- Dimitri Tyomkin (born 1977), Canadian chess grandmaster
- Elizabeth Temkina (1774–1854), alleged daughter of Catherine the Great and Grigory Potemkin
- Jonathan Tiomkin (born 1979), American fencer
- Larry Temkin, American philosopher
- Merle Temkin, American painter, sculptor and installation artist
- Michal Temkin Martinez, American linguist
- Nancy Temkin, American statistician
- Owsei Temkin (1902–2002), Russian-born American medical historian
- Moshik Temkin, American historian
- Richard J. Temkin (born 1945), American physicist
- Todd Temkin (born 1964), American poet
- Zena Temkin (1923–2017), American politician
