= Ana Gruzinskaya Golitsyna =

Georgian princess

Princess Ana Gruzinskaya Golitsyna
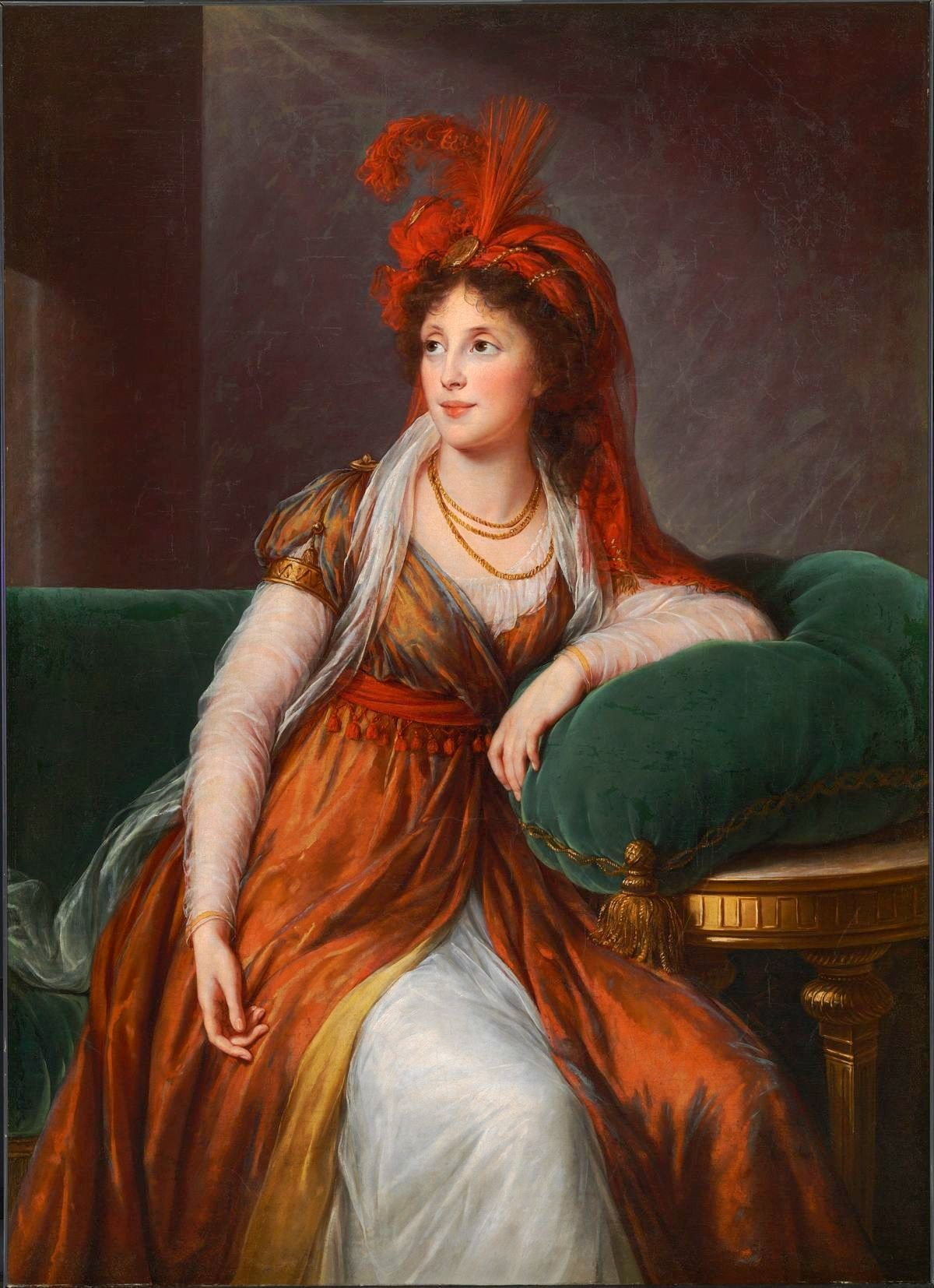
- Portrait by Louise Élisabeth Vigée Le Brun
- Born: 17 August 1763
- Died: 11 October 1842 (aged 79); Saint Petersburg
- Burial: Coastal Monastery of Saint Sergius
- Spouse: Boris Andreevich Golitsyn
- Dynasty: Bagrationi
- Father: Prince Alexander of Kartli
- Mother: Daria Alexandrovna née Menshikova
- Religion: Georgian Orthodox Church

Ana Gruzinskaya Golitsyna (Russian: Анна Грузинская-Голицына; 17 August 1763 — 11 October 1842) was a Russian aristocrat of Georgian royal origin.

== Early life ==
She was the daughter of Prince Alexander of Kartli, grandchild of Bakar of Kartli and great-grandchild of King Vakhtang VI. She had one brother, Prince Georgy Bagration-Gruzinsky. Her mother, Princess Daria Alexandrovna Menshikova, was the granddaughter of Prince Alexander Danilovich Menshikov.

== Marriage ==
Her first marriage was to Alexander Alexandrovitch Litsyn, who died in 1789. The next year, in In 1790, Ana married her third cousin once removed Prince Boris Andreevich Golitsyn, member of the House of Golitsyn, who was a close friend of Georgian general Prince Peter Bagration-Mukhansky (who was also her nephew). Her husband died of a stroke in 1822.

== Death ==
Ana died on 11 October 1842 in Saint Petersburg, and is buried in Coastal Monastery of Saint Sergius.

== Children ==
- Princess Yelizaveta Golitsyna (1790–1870)
- Prince Andrei Golitsyn (1791–1861)
- Prince Alexander Golitsyn (1792–1865)
- Prince Nikolai Golitsyn (1794–1866)
- Princess Sofia Golitsyna (1795–1871)
- Princess Tatiana Golitsyna-Potyomkina (1797–1869)
- Princess Alexandra Golitsyna (1798–1876)
- Princess Irina Golitsyna (1800–1802)
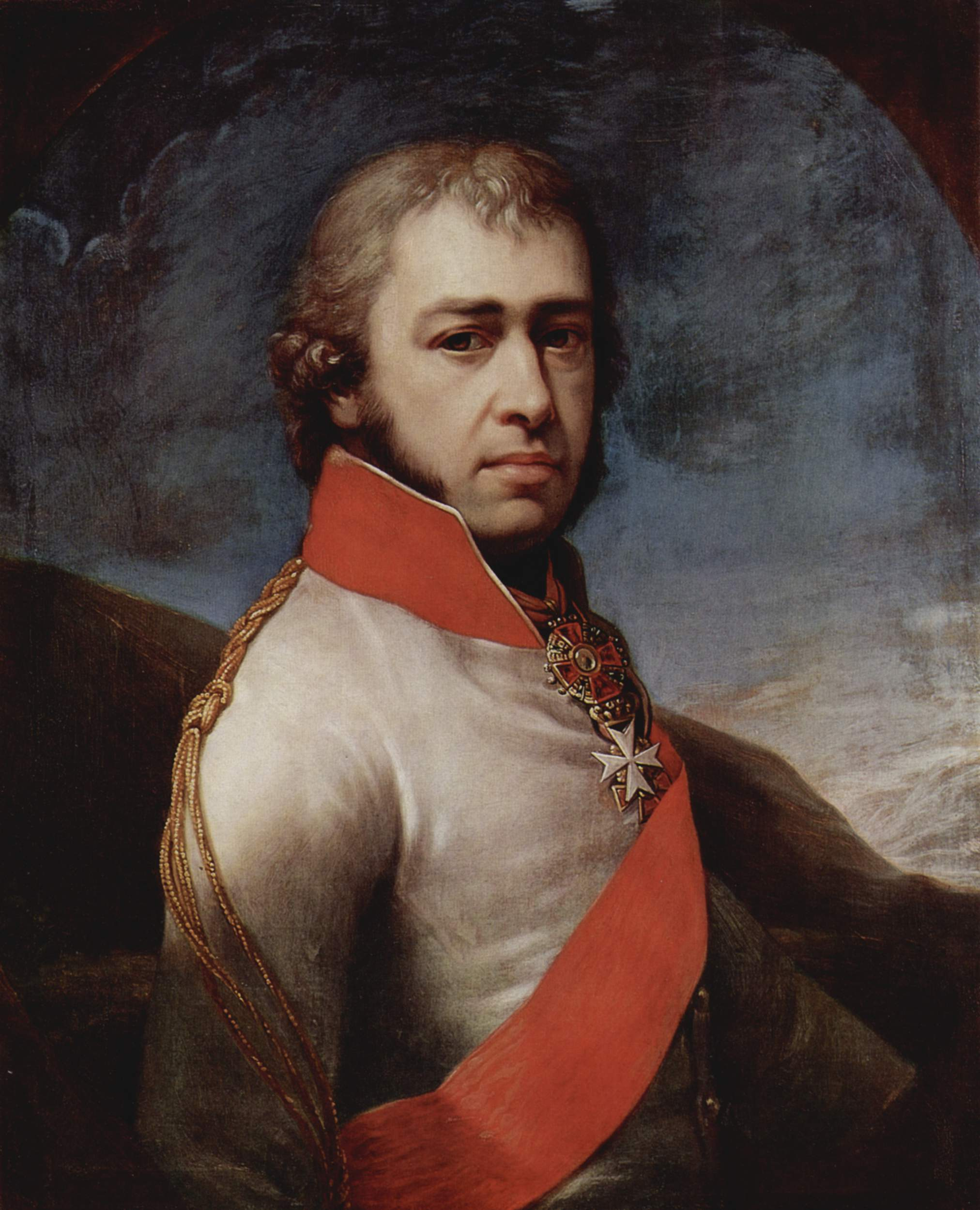
Boris Golitsyn, husband

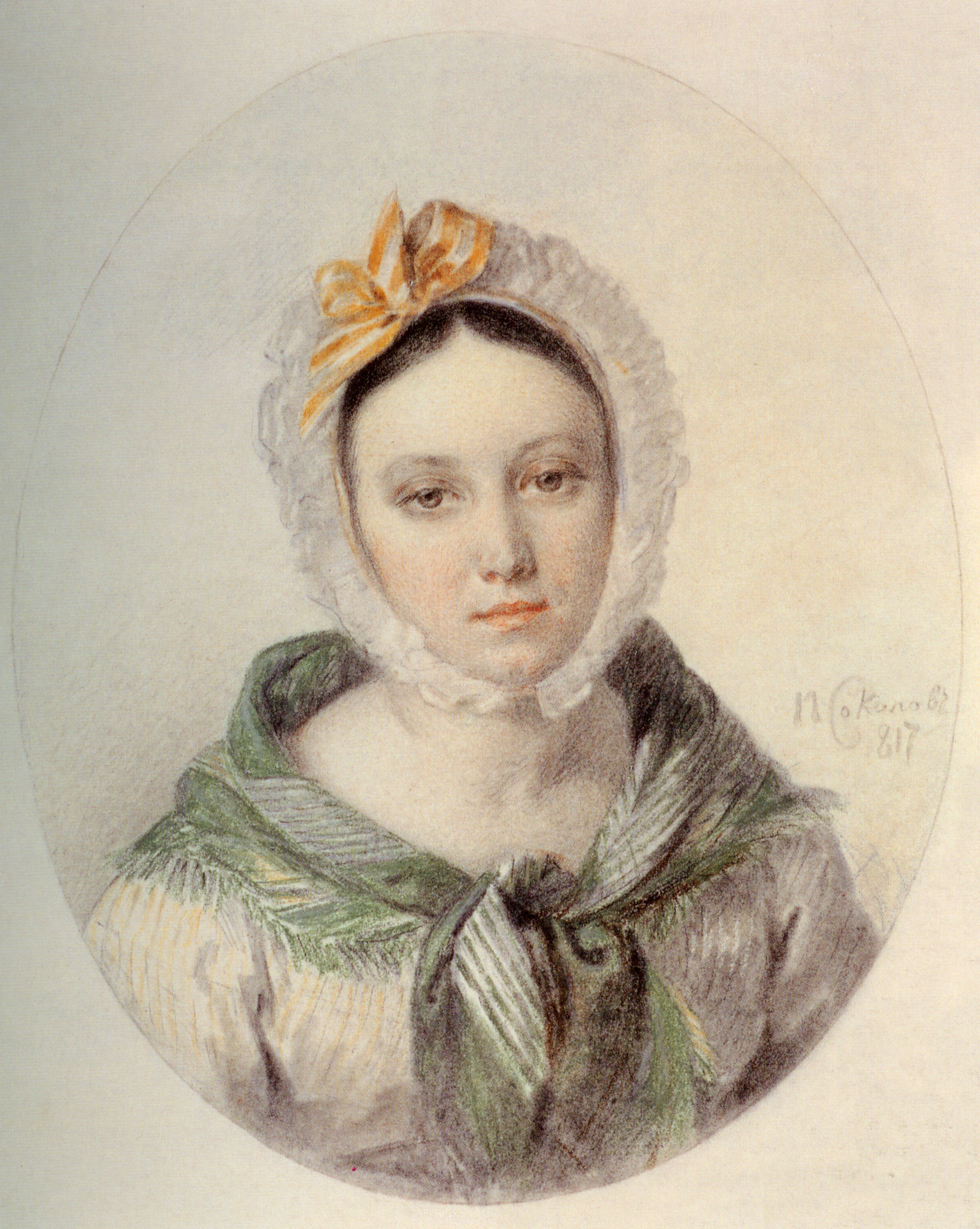
Yelizaveta, daughter

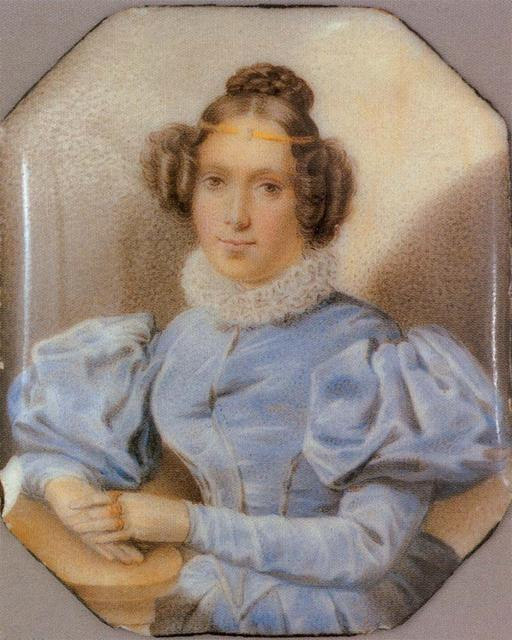
Sofia, daughter

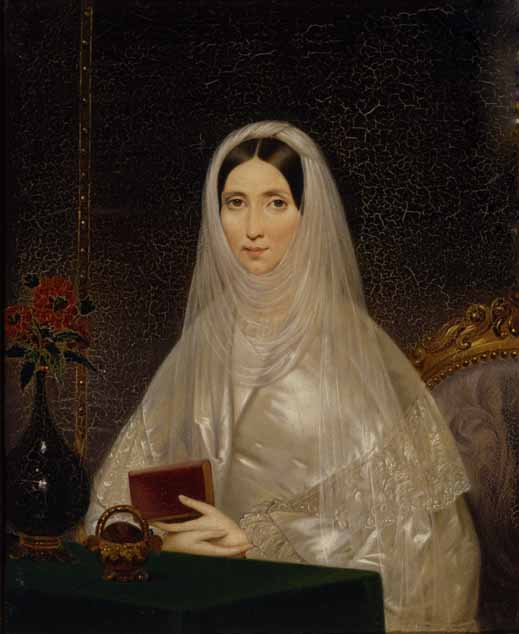
Tatiana, daughter
