= General Golitsyn =

General Golitsyn may refer to:

- Alexander Mikhailovich Golitsyn (1718–1783), Imperial Russian Army general
- Boris Andreevich Golitsyn (1766–1822), Imperial Russian Army lieutenant general
- Dmitry Golitsyn (1771–1844), Imperial Russian Army cavalry general
- Grigory Golitsyn (1838–1907), Imperial Russian Army general
- Mikhail Mikhailovich Golitsyn (Field Marshal) (1675–1730), Imperial Russian Army general
