= Prince Alexander of Kartli (1726–1791) =

Georgian prince

Alexander Gruzinsky
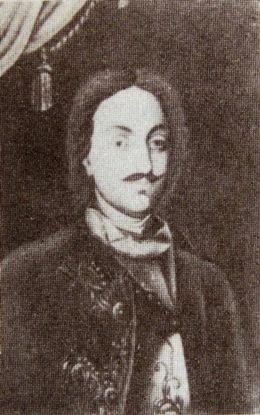
- Alexander by Aleksey Antropov
- Born: 1726
- Died: 1791 (aged 64–65)
- Spouse: Daria Menshikova
- Issue Among others: Georgy; Ana; Darya
- Dynasty: Bagrationi
- Father: Bakar of Kartli
- Mother: Ana of Aragvi
- Religion: Georgian Orthodox Church

Alexander, son of Bakar (Georgian: ალექსანდრე ბაქარის ძე, romanized: aleksandre bakaris dze) or Aleksandr Bakarovich Gruzinsky (Russian: Александр Бакарович Грузинский; 1726–1791) was a Georgian royal prince. Born in Russia into the Mukhrani branch of the Georgian royal dynasty, Alexander is known for his unsuccessful attempt to reclaim the crown of Georgia from his dynastic relatives ruling Eastern Georgia. At the request of Heraclius II, Alexander was deported back to Russia where he was held in confinement by the Russian authorities until his death. In Russia, Alexander bore the surname of Gruzinsky, meaning "Georgian".

== Early life and career ==
Alexander was the son of Bakar of Kartli who had followed his father King Vakhtang VI of Kartli into exile to Russia in 1724. Alexander was born and raised in Russia. After incomplete studies at the Moscow University, he enrolled into the Page Corps and then joined the Imperial Russian army, attaining the rank of a Captain-Poruchik.

== Claimant to the Georgian throne ==
After Bakar's death, Alexander renewed his family's claims to the lost throne of Kartli, now held by their cousins from the neighbouring Kakheti. Alexander's unsanctioned attempts to make his way to Georgia, combined with his support of the Tsar Peter III of Russia, led to him falling out of favour with the new Russian empress Catherine II of Russia. In 1766, the Russian government freed Alexander of his allegiance to Russia, depriving him of his military rank, and arranged his travel to the Caucasus. This came a year after Alexander's half-uncle, Prince Paata, was executed for plotting a coup against the rule of the Kakhetian Bagrationi.

Alexander first travelled to Shiraz to garner the support of Iran's ruler Karim Khan for his cause. Disappointed by Karim's reluctance to assist him, he found shelter at the court of Solomon I, the king of Imereti in western Georgia in 1779. As Solomon's relations with his eastern neighbour, King Heraclius II of Georgia, were not always easy, Alexander was welcomed in Imereti. From there, he entered Kartli and attempted a coup in Tbilisi while Heraclius was absent on a campaign in Erivan in 1779. The revolt was promptly suppressed and Alexander, accompanied by Prince Alexander Amilakhvari, fled to the mountains of Dagestan.

Anxious to eliminate the threat to his rule, Heraclius requested that the Russian government arrest Alexander. It was only after Georgia agreed to becoming a Russian protectorate in 1783 that Fatali Khan of Quba and Derbent was persuaded by the Russian government to surrender the pretender to the Georgian throne. The prince was deported to Smolensk and held there in confinement until his death in 1791. Thus, Heraclius II's last rival for the throne was removed from the scene.

== Family ==
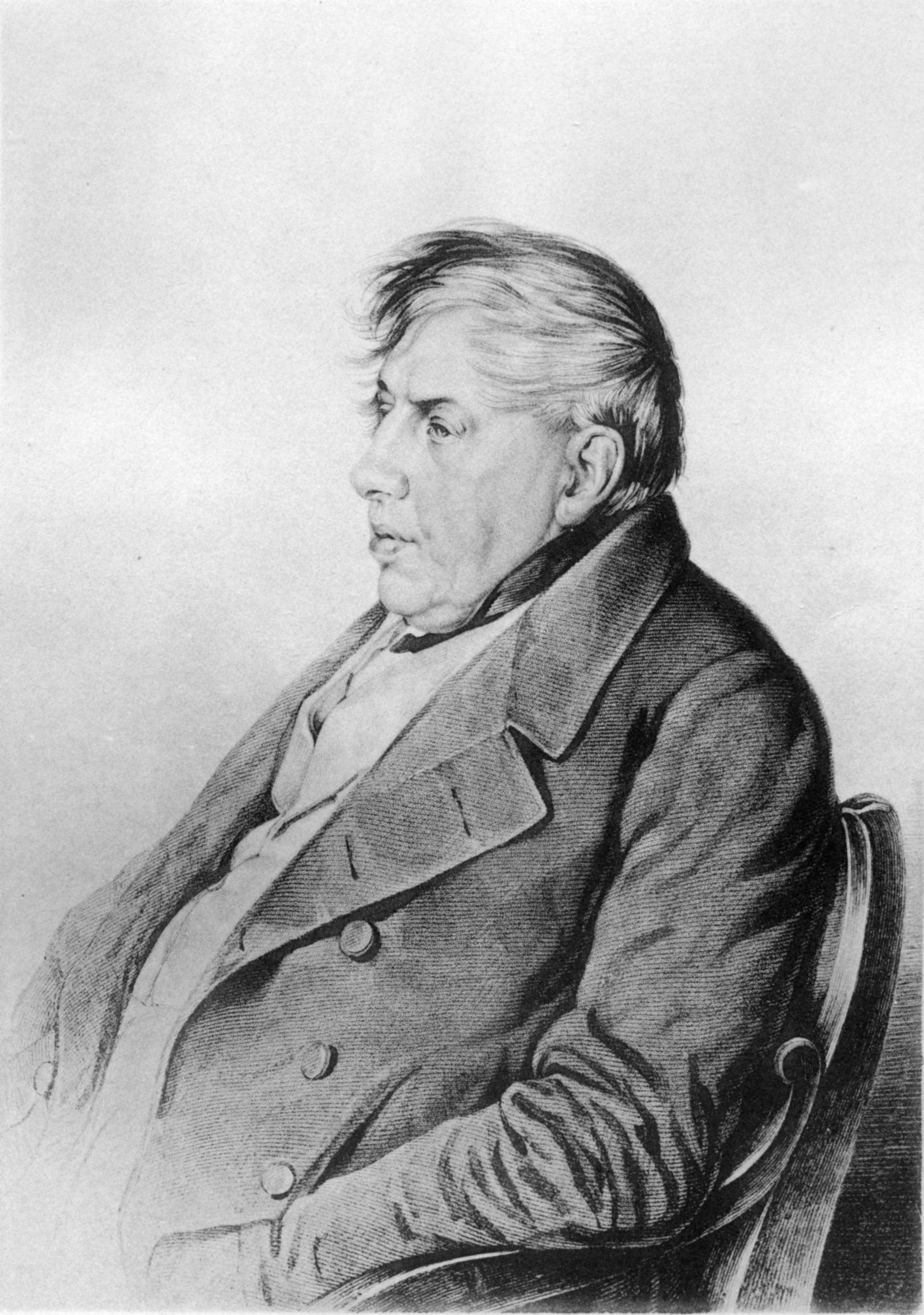
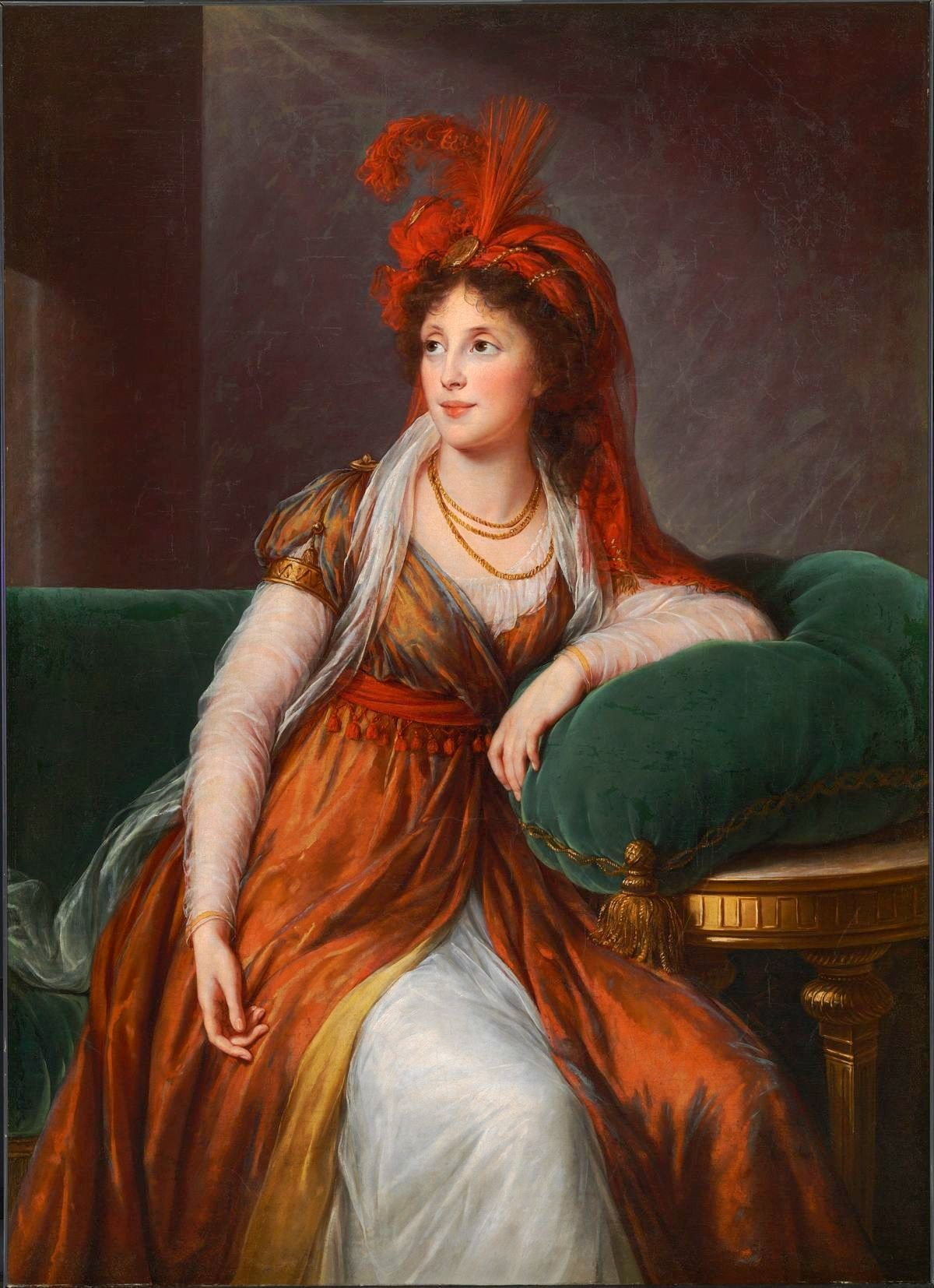
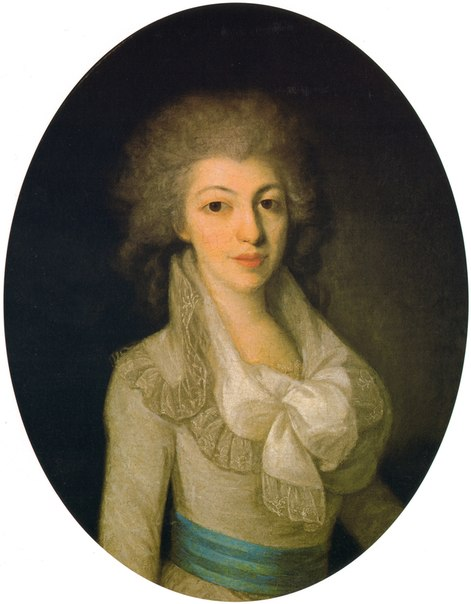
Alexander's children: Georgy, Anna and Daria

Alexander married Princess Daria Aleksandrovna née Menshikova (1747–1817), granddaughter of the once powerful Aleksandr Danilovich Menshikov. They had three sons and two daughters:

- Prince Ivane (Ivan Aleksandrovich Gruzinsky), of whom almost nothing is known.
- Prince Giorgi (Georgy Aleksandrovich Gruzinsky; 1762–1852). He had a daughter named Ana Bagration-Gruzinsky Tolstoy.
- Prince Aleksandre (Aleksandr Aleksandrovich Gruzinsky; c. 1763–1823), Colonel of the Russian army. He died unmarried.
- Princess Ana (Anna Aleksandrovna Gruzinskaya; c. 1763–1842). She was married first to Chevalier Alexander De Litzine (1760–1789), without issue, and then to General Prince Boris Andreyevich Galitzine (1766–1822), with eight children.
- Princess Darejan (Daria Aleksandrovna Gruzinskaya; d. 1796).
