= Potemkin (disambiguation) =

Grigory Potemkin (1739–1791) was a Russian military leader, statesman, nobleman and favourite of Catherine the Great's.

Potemkin may also refer to:

== Arts and entertainment ==
- Battleship Potemkin, a film about a mutiny by Sergei Eisenstein

=== Fictional entities ===
- Potemkin (Guilty Gear), a character in the Guilty Gear series of fighting games
- Potemkin, a character in the 1969 musical Celebration by Tom Jones
- Potemkin, a fictional Soviet submarine in To Kill the Potemkin
- USS Potemkin, a fictional starship in the Star Trek episode "The Ultimate Computer"

== Other uses ==
- Potemkin village, an external façade in politics and economics
- Potemkin Island, an island in Ukraine
- Russian battleship Potemkin
- Potemkin (surname)
- Potemkin (architecture), a steel park in Japan

== See also ==
- Battleship Potemkin uprising, a mutiny in 1905
- "Potemkine", a song by Jean Ferrat glorifying the uprising
