= Darya Gruzinskaya =

Georgian royal princess

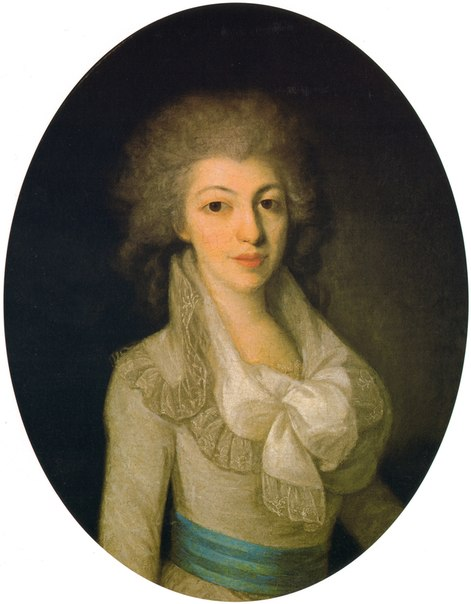
Princess Daria of Georgia by Fyodor Rokotov, late 1700s

Princess Darejan (Georgian: დარეჯანი), known in Russia as the tsarevna Darya Aleksandrovna Gruzinskaya (Russian: Дарья Александровна Грузинская) (died 1796) was a Georgian royal princess (batonishvili) of the Bagrationi dynasty. She was a daughter of Prince Alexander of Kartli.

She was married to Prince Pyotr Sergeyevich Troubetzkoy (1760–1817) and had four children:

- Sergey Trubetzkoy (1790-1860)
- Alexander Trubetzkoy (1792-1853)
- Pyotr Trubetzkoy (1793-1840)
- Elizaveta Trubezkaya (1796-1870)
