= Tema (Jewish name) =

Tema (Yiddish: טֶמֶה, also Tamah) is a Jewish feminine name. Diminutive: "Temka/Temke" (Yiddish: טֶמֶקֶה). The surname Temkin in some cases is derived from the name. Notable people with the name include:

- Tema Filanovskaya (1915–1994), Soviet chess player
- Tema Schneiderman (1917-1943), Jewish resistance courier
