= Grapevine cross =

Symbol of the Georgian Orthodox Church

The grapevine cross (Georgian: ჯვარი ვაზისა, Jvari Vazisa), also known as the Georgian cross or Saint Nino's cross, is a major symbol of the Georgian Orthodox Church and dates possibly from the 4th century AD, when Christianity became the official religion in the kingdom of Iberia (Kartli).

== Background ==
The grapevine cross is recognizable by the slight drooping of its horizontal arms. Traditional accounts credit Saint Nino, a Cappadocian woman who preached Christianity in Iberia (corresponding to modern southern and eastern Georgia, northeastern Turkey) early in the 4th century, with this unusual shape of cross. The legend has it that she received the grapevine cross from the Virgin Mary (or, alternatively, she created it herself on the way to Mtskheta) and secured it by entwining with her own hair. Nino came with this cross on her mission to Georgia. However, the familiar representation of the cross, with its peculiar drooping arms, did not appear until the early modern era.

According to traditional accounts, the cross of St. Nino was kept at Svetitskhoveli Cathedral in Mtskheta until 541. During the Persian invasions it was taken to Armenia and stayed there until David IV of Georgia recovered the Armenian city of Ani from the Muslims in 1124, and brought the cross to Mtskheta. King Vakhtang III of Georgia (1303–1307) enshrined the cross in a special envelope, decorated with the scenes from St. Nino's life. During the 1720s, when Georgia was subjected to Persian and Ottoman invasions, the cross was taken to safer areas, to Ananuri in highland Georgia. From there, the Georgian bishop Timothy brought the cross to the émigré Georgian prince Bakar, residing in Moscow and then in Lyskovo. The Georgian king Erekle II tried to recover the relic for Georgia from Bakar's family, to no avail. In 1801, Bakar's grandson Georgy presented the cross to the Russian tsar Alexander I, who returned it to Georgia in 1802 on the occasion of Georgia's incorporation within the Russian Empire. Since then, the cross has been preserved in the Sioni Cathedral in Tbilisi, Georgia.

== Gallery ==
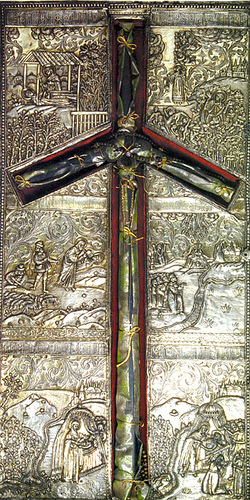
The grapevine cross at Tbilisi Sioni Cathedral.

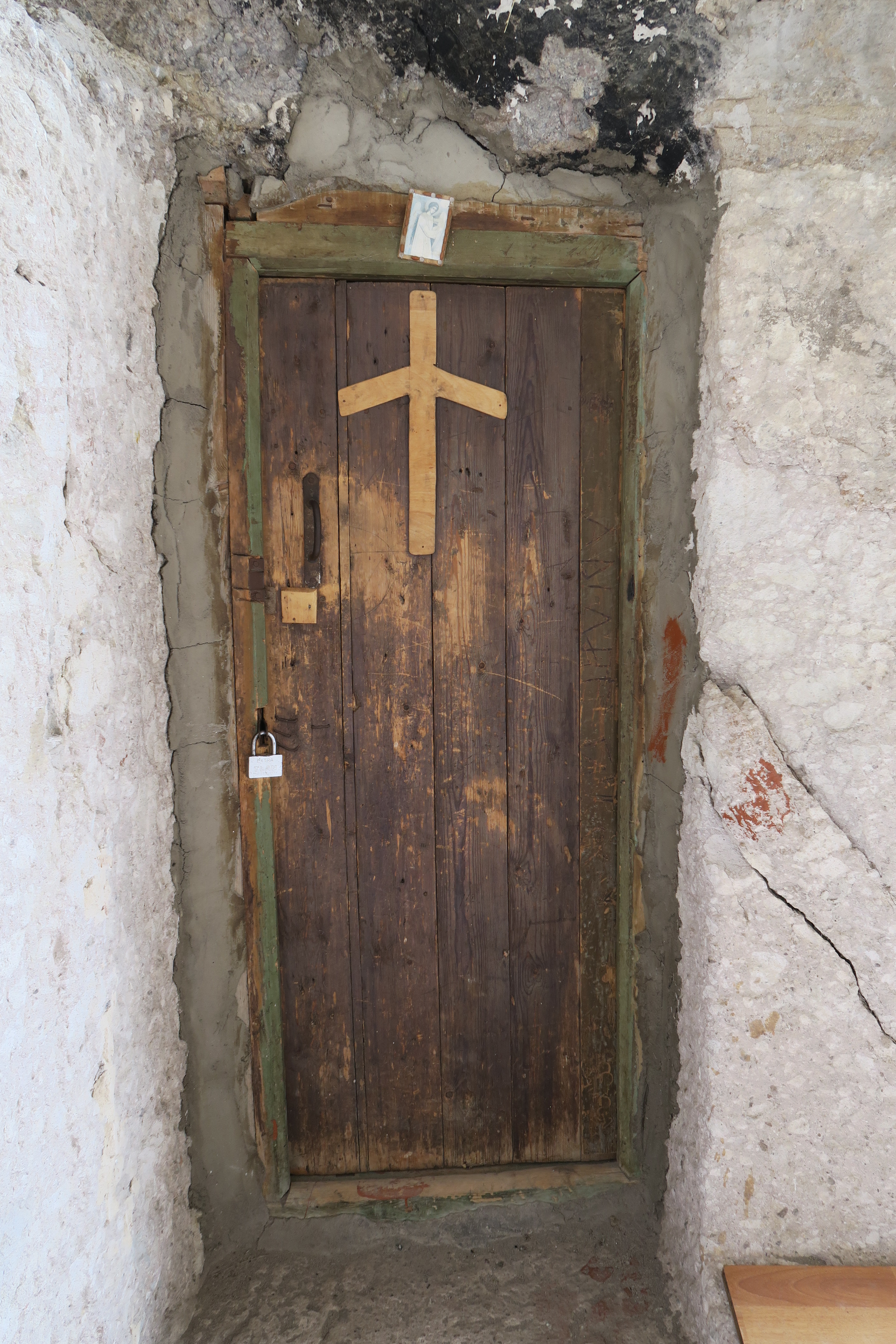
A grapevine cross inlay on a door in Vardzia cave monastery, Georgia

== See also ==
- Christian cross
