= Pnin =

Pnin is a Russian surname produced by truncation of the surname Repnin.

Notable people with the surname include:

- Ivan Pnin (1773–1805), Russian poet and political writer
- Pyotr Pnin (1803–1837), Russian painter

== Fictional characters ==
- Timofey Pnin, protagonist of the novel Pnin by Vladimir Nabokov
- Emir Pnin, a role played by Hilmi Sözer in Die Verwegene – Kämpfe um deinen Traum
