= Russian surnames of illegitimate children =

In the Russian Empire, illegitimate children were sometimes given artificial surnames, rather than the surnames of their parents. In some cases an illegitimate child of a Russian aristocrat was given a surname derived from the surname of the father by truncation of the first syllable. For example, Trubetskoy was trimmed to Betskoy (also Betskiy). There were some other ways to hint at the parent's surname, while in still other cases new surnames had no direct relation to that of parent's.

Other truncated surnames include: Yelagin to Agin, Repnin to Pnin, Golitsyn to Litsyn or deLitsyn, Vorontsov to Rantsov, Rumyantsev to Umyantsev, and Potemkin to Temkina.

In a number of cases illegitimate children received the surname of the adopting parent, as was in the case, e.g., prominent Russian poet Vasily Zhukovsky.

== See also ==
- List of illegitimate children of Russian emperors
- List of illegitimate children of Russian grand dukes
- Category:Illegitimate children of Russian monarchs
- Surnames of illegitimate children
