= Ana Gruzinskaya Tolstaya =

Georgian princess

Anna Gruzinskaya Tolstaya
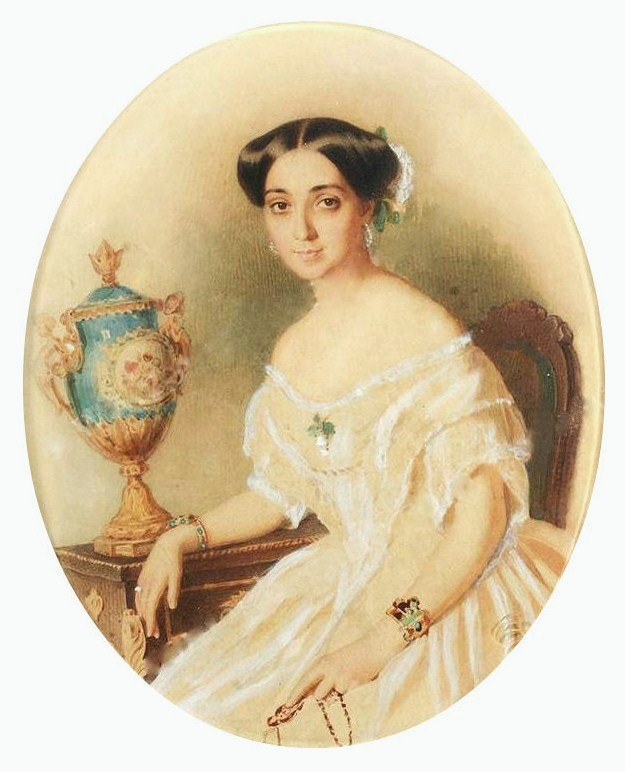
- Anna Gruzinskaya by Pyotr Sokolov
- Born: 31 January 1798; Moscow
- Died: 17 July 1889 (aged 91); Moscow
- Noble family: Bagrationi (by birth); Tolstoy (by marriage)
- Spouse: Prince Alexander Petrovych Tolstoy
- Father: Georgy Gruzinsky
- Mother: Varvara Nikolayevna Bakhmetev

Princess Anna Gruzinskaya Tolstaya (Russian: Анна Грузинская-Толстая, 1798–1889) was a Russian aristocrat of Georgian royal origin.

Princess Anna was born on 31 January 1798 in Moscow to Prince Georgy Gruzinsky and Varvara Nikolayevna Bakhmetev.

Princess Anna married Prince Alexander Petrovych Tolstoy (1801-1873) but had no children.

According to a lady-in-waiting Alexandra Smirnova:

"Princess Anna did not want to get married and wanted to live in a monastery. Her father let her go, and she went to the Belmazhskaya monastery, where she was not considered to [be] set up for the monastic life. The 35-year-old princess then married Tolstoy, a holy man. He submitted himself to her eccentric character and lived with her as brother."

She died in Moscow on 17 July 1889.
