= Elizabeth Temkina =

Russian alleged daughter of Catherine the Great and Grigory Potemkin

- Елизавета Тёмкина
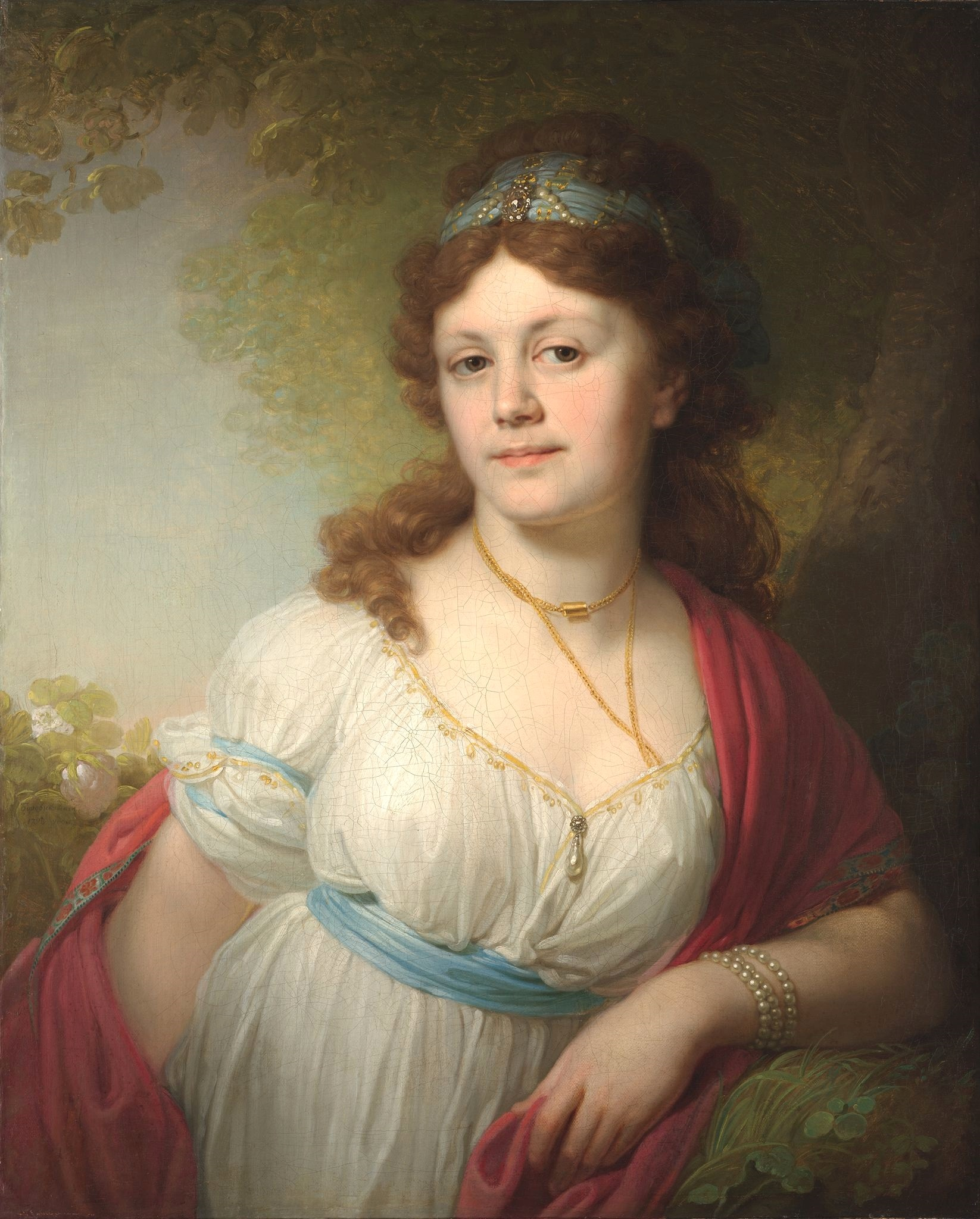
- Portrait by Vladimir Borovikovsky (1798)
- Born: 24 July 1775; Moscow, Russian Empire
- Died: 6 June 1854 (aged 78)
- Spouse: Ivan Kalageorgi
- Children: 10
- Parents: Grigory Potemkin (alleged); Catherine II of Russia (alleged)

Elizabeth Grigorievna Temkina (Russian: Елизавета Григорьевна Тёмкина, romanized: Elizaveta Grigoryevna Tyomkina; 24 July [O.S. 13 July] 1775 – 6 June [O.S. 25 May] 1854) was the once-alleged daughter of Catherine the Great and Grigory Potemkin.

== Biography ==
According to a number of historical testimonies and family legends, which, however, do not have documentary evidence and are disputed by most historians, Grigory Potemkin and Catherine the Great were secretly married. In 1775, a female infant appeared in Potemkin's house, who was named Elizaveta Grigorievna Temkina (the surname was obtained by truncation from "Potemkin" as was a Russian tradition when naming illegitimate children).

The girl was born secretly, but at the court there were rumors that the Empress was her mother, though this is now regarded as unlikely. Elizabeth was brought up in the Samoilov household, her guardian being Alexander Nikolaevich Samoilov, the son of Potemkin's sister Maria Alexandrovna Samoylova (nе́e Potemkina), which could lend some credence to the rumor that her father was one of the Potemkins or a relation of theirs. But tellingly, Elizabeth was never acknowledged by Catherine, in contrast to Count Aleksey Grigorievich Bobrinsky (1762–1813), the illegitimate son of the Empress.

In 1780s, the physician Ivan Filippovich Beck, who treated the grandchildren of the Empress, became the girl's guardian. Elizabeth finished her education in a boarding school.

On April 10, 1794, she received the estate of Mezhigore near Kiev and huge estates in the Kherson province.

In 1797, Alexander Samoilov, Elizabeth's former guardian, commissioned the artist Vladimir Borovikovsky to paint a portrait of Elizabeth, who was 22 years old at the time: "Let Elizaveta Grigorievna be painted in such a way that her neck is open, and her hair lies on it in disheveled curls without order." The portrait was ready in a year.

Her family later lived in near Kiev in the town of Mezhyhirka. The character of Elizaveta Temkina was described in different ways – some called her spoiled, self-confident and uncontrollable, others – a modest woman and a good mother.

Elizabeth died on the 6th of June, 1854, aged 78 years.

== Family ==
On 4 June 1794, Elizabeth was married to Second-Major Ivan Khristoforovich Kalageorgi. Her husband was a wealthy Greek, who had been invited from Greece to join the retinue of the emperor Paul I son Grand Duke Konstantin Pavlovich, in order to teach him Greek in preparation to the reinstatement the Byzantine monarchy with Catherine's grandson Constantine as emperor, but this plan was never realized. Nevertheless, because of this Kalageorgi had close ties to the imperial family and would come to be the governor of Kherson (which had been founded by Elizabeth's alleged father Potemkin) and then of Ekaterinoslav.

The couple had 10 children together:

- Varvara Ivanovna (1795), who married Nicholas Ovsyaniko-Kulikovsky and had four children.
- Ekaterina Ivanovna (1798 – 12 January 1837), who married Victor Lutkovsky. She died giving birth to her thirteenth child.
- Alexander Ivanovich (1799 – 1864), who married Catherine Manvelova and had two sons.
- Grigory Ivanovich
- Sophia Ivanovna
- Anastasia Ivanovna
- Nadezhda Ivanovna (19 August 1809), who married Vladimir Vladislavlev.
- Vera Ivanovna (4 December 1810), who married Peter Martos and had six children.
- Konstantin Ivanovich (29 June 1813), who married twice and had a son.
- Nikolai Ivanovich (1 June 1816 – January 1876), who married Julie von Engelhardt.

The great-grandson of Elizaveta Temkina, the famous literary critic and linguist Dmitry Ovsyaniko-Kulikovsky, described the life of his ancestors as follows: "The family lived amicably, cheerfully and noisily, but at the same time somehow very restless, expecting all sorts of troubles and misfortunes from time to time."

== Sources ==
- Montefiore, Simon Sebag (2010). Catherine the Great and Potemkin: The Imperial Love Affair. Orion. ISBN 978-0-297-86623-7.
