= Georgy Gruzinsky =

Russian nobleman

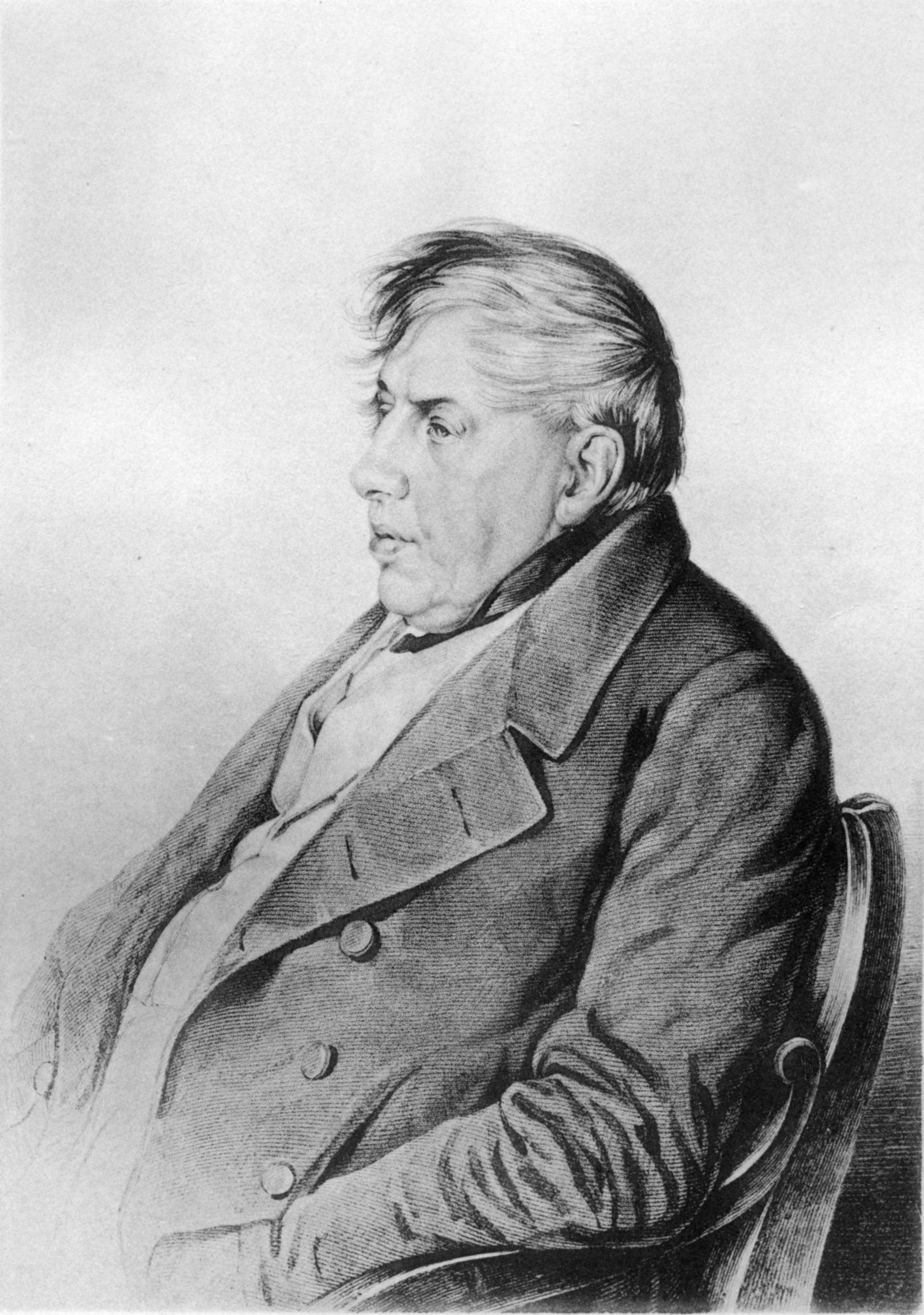
- Prince Gruzinsky by Carl Peter Mazer, 1840s
- Born: 2 November 1762
- Died: 15 May 1852 (aged 89)
- Burial: Church of Lyskovo
- Spouse: Varvara Bakhmetyeva
- Issue: Anna Gruzinsky Tolstaya
- Dynasty: Bagrationi dynasty
- Father: Alexander Gruzinsky
- Mother: Daria Menshikova
- Religion: Georgian Orthodox Church

Prince Georgy Aleksandrovich Gruzinsky (Russian: Георгий Александрович Грузинский; 2 November 1762 – 15 May 1852) was a Russian nobleman of royal Georgian descent. An influential landowner and official in Nizhny Novgorod, he was known for his authoritarian rule over his estates as well as charity. During Napoleon's invasion of Russia in 1812, he raised a local militia force to fight the French.

== Family background ==
Prince Georgy Gruzinsky was born into the family of Alexander Gruzinsky of the House of Mukhrani, claimant to the throne of Georgia, and his wife Daria Menshikova. Georgy was, thus, grandson of Bakar of Kartli and great-grandson of King Vakhtang VI on his father's side and great-grandson of the Russian statesman Aleksandr Menshikov on his mother's side.

== Career ==
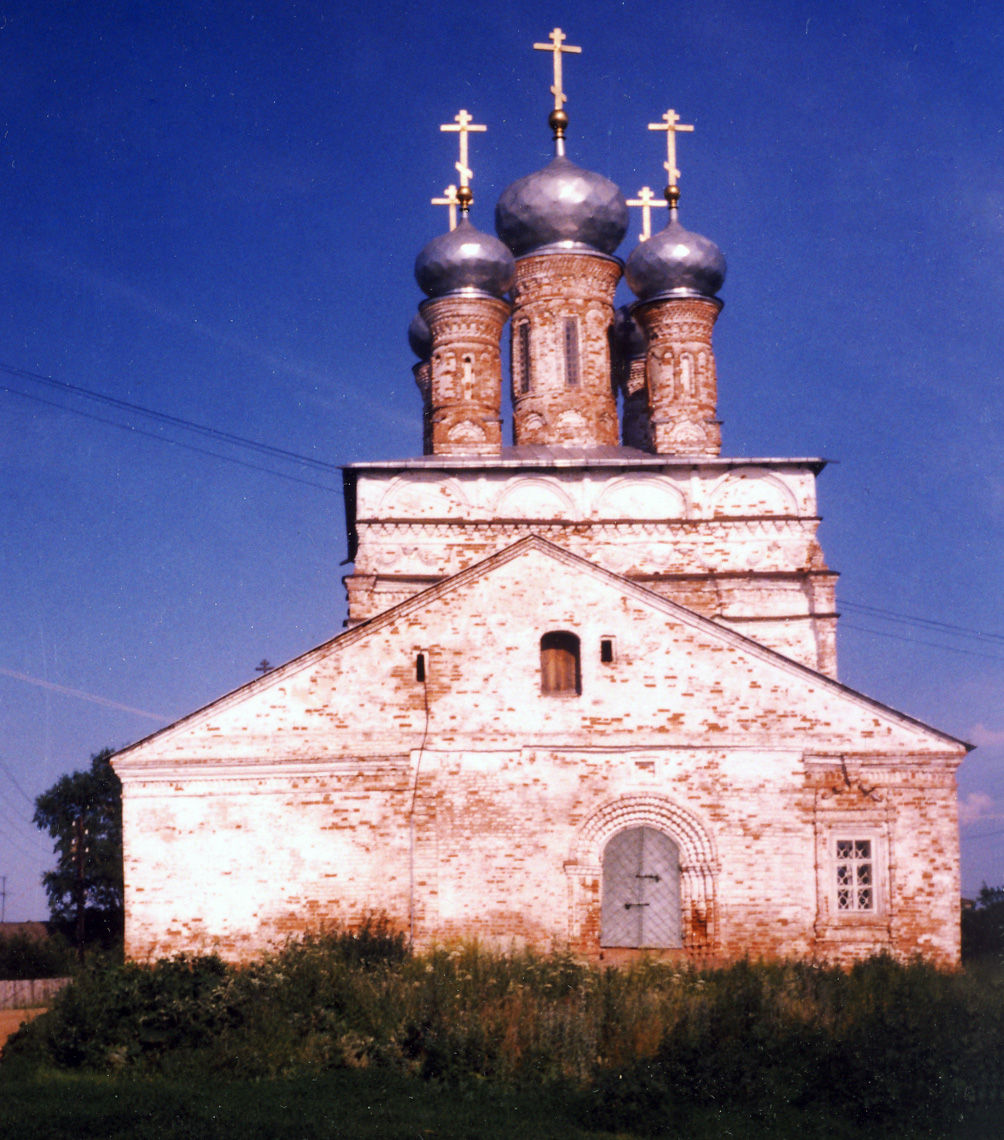
The Lyskovo Savior Transfiguration Church.

Prince Georgy succeeded to the familial domain of Lyskovo on the Volga, which he ruled as a local "tsar". Beyond Lyskovo, Gruzinsky owned estates in the cities of Nizhny Novgorod and Moscow. Lyskovo at that time housed St. Nino's Cross, the principal relic of Georgian Christianity, brought from Ottoman-occupied Georgia for Georgy's grandfather Bakar.

Prince Georgy was enlisted in the Saint-Petersburg Infantry Regiment in 1768 and retired with the rank of major in 1778. Beyond Georgian and Russian, he commanded French, German, and Italian, and was interested in history, geography, architecture, mathematics, physics, military engineering, and artillery. A theatre lover, he formed and sponsored a troupe for his own entertainment.

He was elected marshal of the nobility of the Nizhny Novgorod Governorate for two consecutive three-year terms in 1795 and again in 1798. Soon Gruzinsky fell in disfavor with the tsar Paul I. He was found guilty of cruel treatment of his peasants and various machinations, but Gruzisnky evaded the court sentence by faking death and staging his own funeral, having bribed local officials. He remained in obscurity until the accession of Alexander I who made him, in 1802, an Actual Chamberlain and appointed to a Court of Conscience in Nizhny Novgorod whence he resigned in 1804. He was reelected as the governorate's marshal of nobility in 1807 and continued to serve in this capacity for the following 21 years until removed by Nicholas I for disregard of the Russian laws.

During Napoleon's invasion of Russia in 1812, Gruzinsky organized and headed the Nizhny Novgorod militia, which amounted to 12,440 men and fought under General Nikolay Muromtsyev against the Grande Armée until the fall of Paris in 1814. After the war, Gruzinsky spent the rest of his life in Lyskovo, dispensing charity. In the 1820s, he hosted and supported Anton II, a Georgian prelate dispossessed by the Russian authorities of his office. In 1852, Gruzinsky died at the age of 89 at his estate, allegedly in a fury at the sight of a peasant entering his house with a hat. He was interred at a familial burial ground at the Transfiguration Church of Lyskovo.

== Marriage and children ==
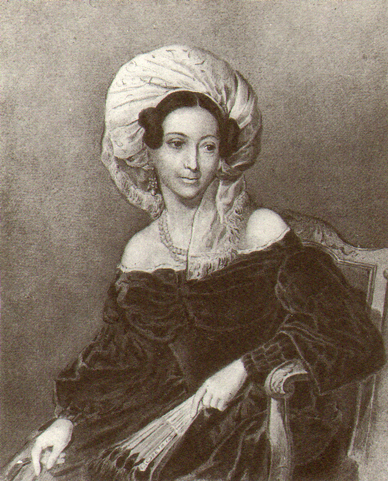
Princess Anna Georgyevna Gruzinskaya.

Georgy Gruzinsky was married to Princess Varvara Nikolayevna Bakhmetyeva, by whom he had two children: Anna (31 January 1798 – 17 July 1889) and Ivan; the latter died at a very young age. Furthermore, Prince Gruzinsky had several purported extramarital children, of whom Andrey Medvedev and Yevgraf Stogov are the best known. Gruzinsky himself claimed Medvedev as his son in order to prevent his daughter Anna from marrying him. In despair, Medvedev took a monastic oath and became a well-known cleric in Nizhny. Anna eventually married Count Alexander Pyetrovich Tolstoy, without issue.
