= Alexander Potemkin =

Father of Grigory Potemkin

Alexander Vasilyevich Potemkin (1673–1746) was a Russian nobleman. He is known for being the father of Grigory Potemkin. He died on 2 June 1746.

== Biography ==
Alexander was the only son of Vasili Silych Potemkin (died 1702), and a grandson of the governor of Kolomna, Sila Semyonovich Potemkin (died c. 1689).

He joined the Smolensk garrison in 1699 and was a fought in the Great Northern War and the Russo-Turkish War. On 10 March 1708, he was promoted to ensign of the Ustyug infantry regiment. In 1709 he defended Battle of Poltava against the Swedish. He accompanied Swedish prisoners to Smolensk before joining Sheremetev's Livonian campaign near Riga, after which he was promoted to second lieutenant and lieutenant of the Ustyug Infantry Regiment. After the Siege of Riga in 1710, he was promoted once more to captain-lieutenant of the Ustyug Infantry Regiment.

In 1712, he operated in Finland and was promoted to Captain of the Grenadier Infantry Regiment of Colonel I. A. von Mengden.

On 23 October 1728 he was promoted to the rank of Major and dischaged from military service. He was then sent to the King of Arms' Office and assigned to civil affairs where he served in the Judicial Arrears Office in Alatyr Province until the endo of 1729.

Potemkin participated in the Battle of the Palaces and was among those who signed to restore autocratic power to Empress Anna Ivanovna.

Potemkin was the owner of the village of Denisyevo, Kolomensky district, consisting on 6 peasant households; the village of Pyatnitsa, Tula district, consisting of 4 peasant households; half the village of Chizhevo, Smolensk district, of which he owned 18 peasant households.

In 1744, he owned No. 87 Dolshaya Nikitskaya Street in the Zemlyanoy Gorod district of Moscow.

== Marriage and Children ==
Potemkin was married twice. He married Marina Ivanovna no later than 1699. She was a landowner in the village of Nekhalyo, Kineshmesky district. In 1726, she took monastic vows and became a nun at the Yegorevsky Convent in Moscow. This marriage was childless.

He married secondly to the widow Daria Vasilievna Skuratova née Kaftyreva (1704-1780), daughter and heiress of Vasili Ivanovich (1665-1729). In 1776, she was made a lady-in-waiting at the court of Catherine the Great. Despite their six children, the marriage proved unhappy. Following the birth of their son, Alexander's cousin, Sergei Potemkin, visited the family and informed the patriarch that Grigori was not his son. It is assumed that he did this in order to inherit the estates. Alexander petitioned to annull the marriage and declare Grigori a bastard. Not wanting to enter a nunnery like his first wife, Daria summoned her son's godfather, Kizlovsky who persuaded Alexander to drop the petition. Alexander was paranoid and jealous, forbidding his sons-in-law from kissing his wife on the hand.

Their children were;

- Martha Elena (1724-1775), married Vasili von Engelhardt and had six daughters, the famous Potemkin Nieces
- Maria, married Nikolai Samoilov
- Grigori Alexandrovich (1739–1791)
- Pelagia, married Peter E. Vysotsky
- Daria, married Alexander A. Likachev
- Nadia (1738-1757), died unmarried

== Sources ==
- Montefiore, Simon Sebag (4 October 2001). Prince of Princes: The Life of Potemkin. London: Weidenfeld & Nicolson. ISBN 978-1-84212-438-3.
- Soloveytchik, George (1938). Potemkin. Taylor & Francis. Retrieved 6 January 2011.
