= Boris Andreevich Golitsyn =

Russian nobleman

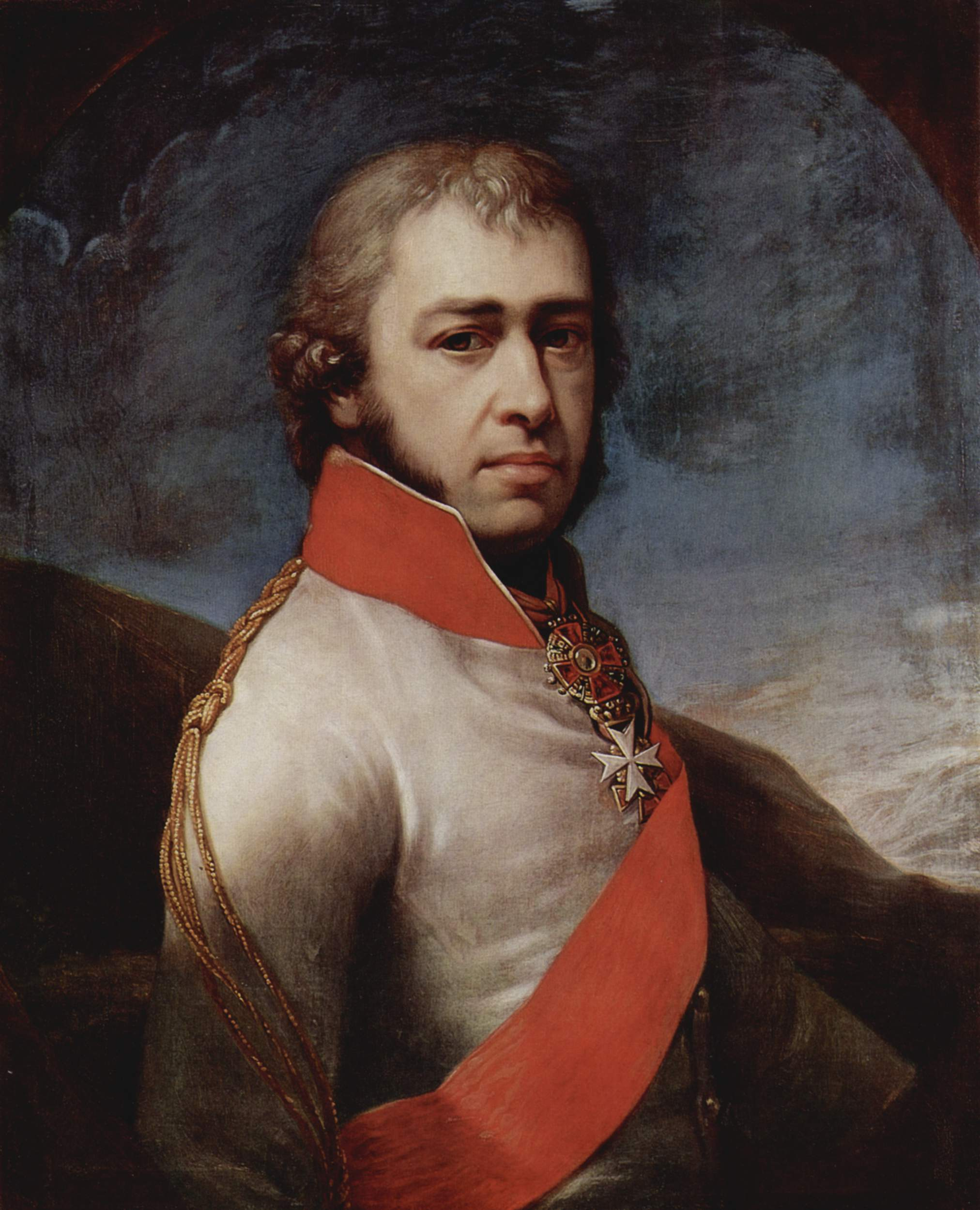
Golitsyn by Johann Baptist von Lampi the Elder, 1797

Prince Boris Andreevich Golitsyn (Russian – Борис Андреевич Голицын; 15 May 1766 – 30 March 1822) was a Russian nobleman, army officer and member of the Golitsyn family.

== Life ==
His parents were Andrei Michailovich Golitsyn (1729–1770) and his wife princess Elizabeta Borisovna Jusupova (1743–1770). He was named after his maternal uncle, Boris Grigorievich Jusupov, while his paternal uncle was Mikhail Mikhailovich Golitsyn (1675–1730).

He joined the Preobraženski Regiment in 1779. Four years later, he rose to the rank of sub-lieutenant. He fought against the Swedes in 1790 and the Poles in 1794, rising to major general. He was made a marshal to Grand Duke Konstantin Pavlovich of Russia on 28 November 1796 and on 18 March 1798 became a lieutenant general. He transferred to a cavalry regiment on 27 November 1798 before finally retiring on 5 January 1800. He married Anna Bagration, and was a close friend of her nephew and Georgian general Pyotr Bagration who died of gangrene on his estate at Sima, Vladimir Oblast. Boris joined the Napoleonic wars afterwards and took part in the 1813 siege of Danzig.

== Marriage and issue ==
In 1790 he married princess Ana of Georgia. They had eight children:

- Elizaveta Borisovna (1790–1870), married prince Boris Alekseevich Kurakin, three children;
- Andrei (1791–1861);
- Aleksandr (1792–1865), married Anna Vasilevna Lanskaya, one daughter;
- Nikolai (1794–1866);
- Sofia (1795–1871), married Konstantin Markovich Poltorackij, one son;
- Tatiana (1797—1869), married Aleksandr Michajlovich Potëmkin;
- Aleksandra (1798—1876), married Sergej Ivanovič Meščerskij;
- Irina (1800–1802).

== Death ==
He died from a stroke, aged 55, and was buried at Saint Alexander Nevsky Monastery.

== Sources ==
- Долгоруков И. М. Капище моего сердца, или Словарь всех тех лиц, с какими я был в разных отношениях в течение моей жизни.-М., 1997.
