= Tatiana Borisovna Potemkina =

Russian noblewoman (1797–1869)

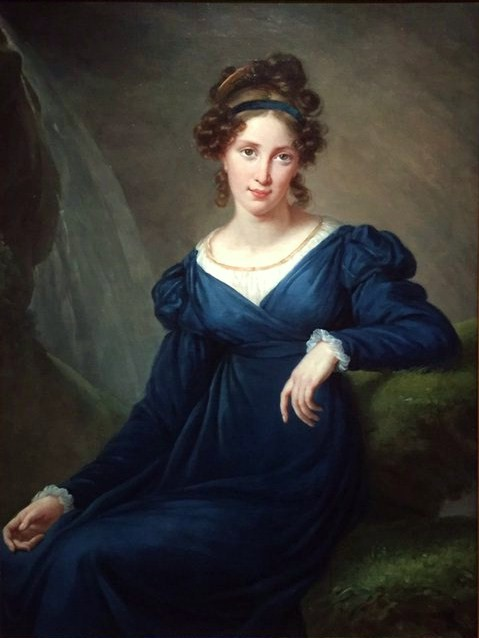
- Tatiana in 1820
- Born: Tatiana Borisovna Golitsyna; 30 January 1797; Saint Petersburg, Russian Empire
- Died: 1 July 1869 (aged 72); Berlin, Kingdom of Prussia
- Buried: Annunciation Church of the Alexander Nevsky Lavra
- Noble family: House of Golitsyn
- Spouse: Alexandr Mikhailovich Potemkin
- Father: Boris Andreevich Golitsyn
- Mother: Princess Ana Gruzinskaya Bagrationi

Tatiana Borisovna Potemkina (Russian: Татья́на Бори́совна Потёмкина; née Golitsyna [Голи́цына]; 30 January 1797 – 1 July 1869) was a Russian noblewoman, philanthropist, and state lady from the house of Golitsyn. She was a daughter of Ana Gruzinsky and her husband Boris Andreevich Golitsyn. In 1814 she married Alexandr Mikhailovich Potemkin. She funded the restoration of the Holy Mountains Lavra monastery, in Donetsk Oblast, eastern Ukraine.
