= Alexandr Mikhailovich Potemkin =

Russian nobleman (1787–1872)

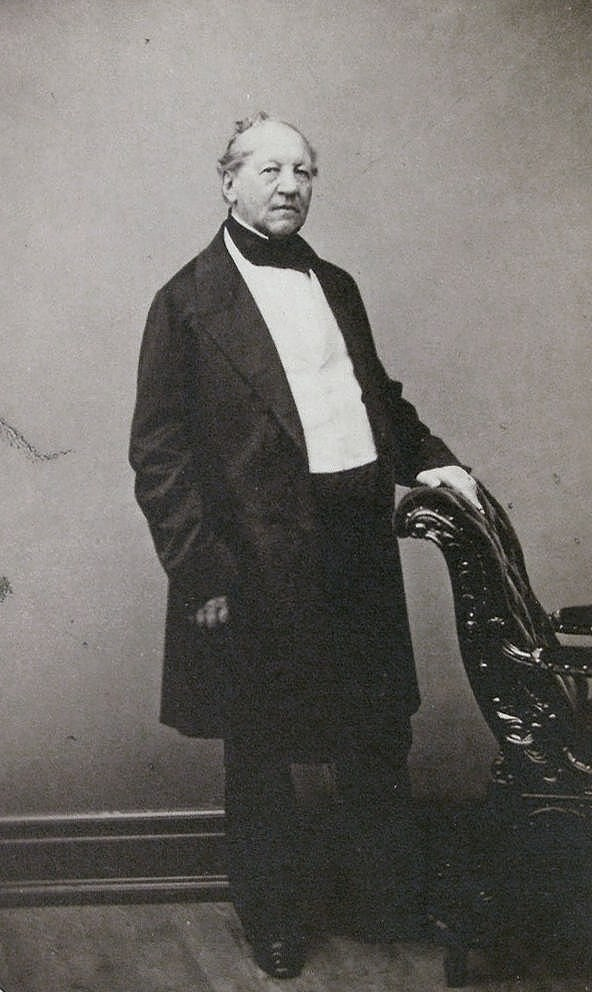
- Born: 30 January 1787; Saint Petersburg, Russian Empire
- Died: 19 July 1872 (aged 85); Gostilitsy, Russian Empire
- Noble family: Potemkin
- Spouse: Princess Tatyana Golitsyna (m. 1814; died 1869)
- Father: Mikhail Sergeevich Potemkin
- Mother: Tatiana Vasilievna Engelhardt

Alexandr Mikhailovich Potemkin (30 January 1787 - 19 July 1872) was a Russian nobleman and army officer. He fought against the French invasion of Russia in 1812, the 1813-15 campaign and the Battle of Paris, rising to the rank of colonel. He also led the nobility in the Saint Petersburg Governorate, served as an Active Privy Councillor and (with his wife Tatiana) owned, re-opened and restored the Holy Mountains Lavra monastery.

== Sources ==
- История лейб-гвардии Преображенского полка 1683—1883 // Сост. А. Чичерин, С. Долгов, А. Афанасьев. — СПб, 1883. — С. 174.
