= Grigory Potemkin =

Russian military leader and statesman (1739–1791)

His Serene Highness Prince Grigory Potemkin
- Григорий Потёмкин
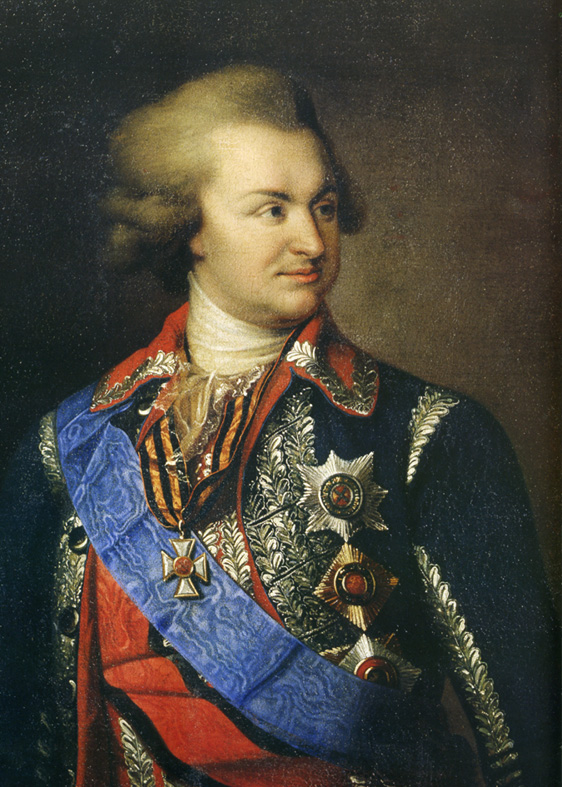

President of the College of War
- In office 1774–1791
- Preceded by: Zakhar Chernyshev
- Succeeded by: Nikolay Saltykov

Personal details
- Born: 11 October 1739 (N.S.) (Note: A number of dates as late as 1742 have been found on record; the veracity of any one is unlikely to be proved. This is his "official" birth-date as given on his tombstone.) Chizhevo, Smolensk Governorate, Russian Empire
- Died: 16 October 1791 (aged 52) (N.S.) Iași, Principality of Moldavia, Ottoman Empire
- Spouse: Catherine II of Russia (possible)
- Children: Elizabeth Grigorieva Temkina (alleged)
- Parents: Alexander Potemkin (father); Daria Skuratowa (mother)

Military service
- Allegiance: Russia
- Branch/service: Imperial Russian Army; Imperial Russian Navy
- Years of service: 1762–1791
- Rank: Field marshal
- Commands: Black Sea Fleet, Yekaterinoslav Army, (Note: 1787–1789) Southern Army (Note: 1789–1791)
- Battles/wars: See list: Russo-Turkish War (1768–1774); Battle of Focșani (1770); Battle and Storming of Giurgiu (1770); Battle of Turnu (1771); Siege of Silistra (1773); Russo-Turkish War (1787–1792); Siege of Ochakov (1788); Siege of Bender (1789)

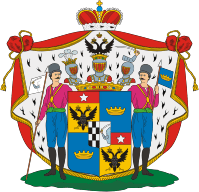
Princely arms of Grigory Potemkin

Prince Grigory Aleksandrovich Potemkin-Tauricheski (Note: /pəˈtɛmkɪn/ pə-TEM-kin, also UK: /pɒˈ-/ po-, US: /poʊˈ-, pəˈtjɔːmkɪn/ poh-, pə-TYAWM-kin; Russian: Князь Григорий Александрович Потёмкин-Таврический, romanized: Knyaz' Grigoriy Aleksandrovich Potyomkin-Tavricheskiy, IPA: [ɡrʲɪˈɡorʲɪj ɐlʲɪkˈsandrəvʲɪtɕ pɐˈtʲɵmkʲɪn tɐˈvrʲitɕɪskʲɪj]) (11 October [O.S. 30 September] 1739 – 16 October [O.S. 5 October] 1791) was a Russian Imperial statesman who rose to prominence as a favourite and, according to a widely supported theory, the morganatic spouse of Catherine the Great.

Potemkin was born into a family of middle-income landowners of Russian nobility. He first attracted Catherine's favor for helping in her 1762 coup, then distinguished himself as a military commander in the Russo-Turkish War (1768–1774). He became Catherine's lover, favorite and possibly her consort. After their passion cooled, he remained her lifelong friend and favored statesman. Catherine obtained for him the title of Prince of the Holy Roman Empire and gave him the title of Prince of the Russian Empire among many others; he was both a Grand Admiral and the head of all of Russia's land and irregular forces. Potemkin's achievements include the peaceful annexation of the Crimea (1783) and the successful second Russo-Turkish War (1787–1792), during which the armed forces under his command besieged Ochakov. He died during negotiations over the Treaty of Iași, which ended a war with the Ottoman Empire that he had overseen.

In 1775, Potemkin became the governor-general of Russia's new southern provinces. An absolute ruler, he worked to colonize the wild steppes, controversially dealing firmly with the Cossacks who lived there. He founded the towns of Kherson, Nikolayev, Sevastopol, and Yekaterinoslav. Ports in the region became bases for his new Black Sea Fleet.

His rule in the south is associated with the (probably mythical) "Potemkin village", a ruse involving the construction of painted façades to mimic real villages, full of happy, well-fed people, for visiting officials to see. Potemkin was known for his love of women, gambling, and material wealth. He oversaw the construction of many historically significant buildings, including the Tauride Palace in Saint Petersburg.

== Biography ==
=== Early life ===
A distant relative of the Muscovite diplomat Pyotr Potemkin (1617–1700), Grigory was born in the village of Chizhovo near Smolensk into a family of middle-income noble landowners. His father, Alexander Potemkin (1673–1746), was a decorated war veteran. His mother Daria Vasilievna Kondyreva (1704–1780) was "good-looking, capable and intelligent", though their marriage proved ultimately unhappy. Potemkin received his first name in honour of his father's cousin Grigory Matveevich Kizlovsky, a civil servant who became his godfather. Historian Simon Sebag Montefiore has suggested that Kizlovsky fathered Potemkin, who became the centre of attention, heir to the village and the only son among six children. As the son of an (albeit petty) noble family, he grew up with the expectation that he would serve the Russian Empire.

After Alexander died in 1746, Daria took charge of the family. In order to achieve a career for her son, and aided by Kizlovsky, the family moved to Moscow, where Potemkin enrolled at a gymnasium school attached to the University of Moscow. The young Potemkin became adept at languages and interested in the Russian Orthodox Church. He enlisted in the army in 1750 at age eleven, in accordance with the custom of noble children. In 1755 a second inspection placed him in the élite Horse Guards regiment.

Having graduated from the university school, Potemkin became one of the first students to enroll at the university itself. Talented in both Greek and theology, he won the university's gold medal in 1757 and became part of a twelve-student delegation sent to Saint Petersburg later that year. The trip seems to have affected Potemkin: afterwards he studied little and was soon expelled. Faced with isolation from his family, he rejoined the Guards, where he excelled. At this time his net worth amounted to 430 souls (serfs), equivalent to that of the poorer gentry. His time was taken up with "drinking, gambling, and promiscuous lovemaking", and he fell deep in debt.

Grigory Orlov, one of Catherine's lovers, led a palace coup in June 1762 that ousted the Emperor Peter III and enthroned Catherine II. Sergeant Potemkin represented his regiment in the revolt. Allegedly, as Catherine reviewed her troops in front of the Winter Palace before their march to the Peterhof, she lacked a sword-knot (or possibly hat plumage), which Potemkin quickly supplied. Potemkin's horse then appeared to refuse to leave her side for several minutes before Potemkin and the horse returned to the ranks.

After the coup, Catherine singled out Potemkin for reward and ensured his promotion to second lieutenant. Though Potemkin was among those guarding the ex-Tsar, it appears that he had no direct involvement in Peter's murder in July. Catherine promoted him again to Kammerjunker (gentleman of the bedchamber), though he retained his post in the Guards. Potemkin was soon formally presented to the Empress as a talented mimic; his imitation of her was well received.

=== Courtier and general ===
Although Catherine had not yet taken Potemkin as a lover, it seems likely that she passively—if not actively—encouraged his flirtatious behaviour, including his regular practice of kissing her hand and declaring his love for her: without encouragement, Potemkin could have expected trouble from the Orlovs (Catherine's lover Grigory and his four brothers) who dominated court. Potemkin entered Catherine's circle of advisers, and in 1762 took his only foreign assignment, to Sweden, bearing news of the coup. On his return, he was appointed Procurator, and won a reputation as a lover. Under unclear circumstances, Potemkin then lost his left eye and fell into a depression. According to legend, Grigory and Alexei Orlov invited Potemkin to a friendly game of billiards, then attacked him with their cues "for flirting with Catherine", resulting in Potemkin's eye being damaged during the brawl; the wound then turned septic "after being mistreated by a quack physician". Other sources claim that Potemkin's eye was struck by a ball "during a tennis match". According to Simon Sebag Montefiore, the cause of the damage was most likely just "an infection." His confidence shattered, Potemkin withdrew from court, becoming something of a hermit.

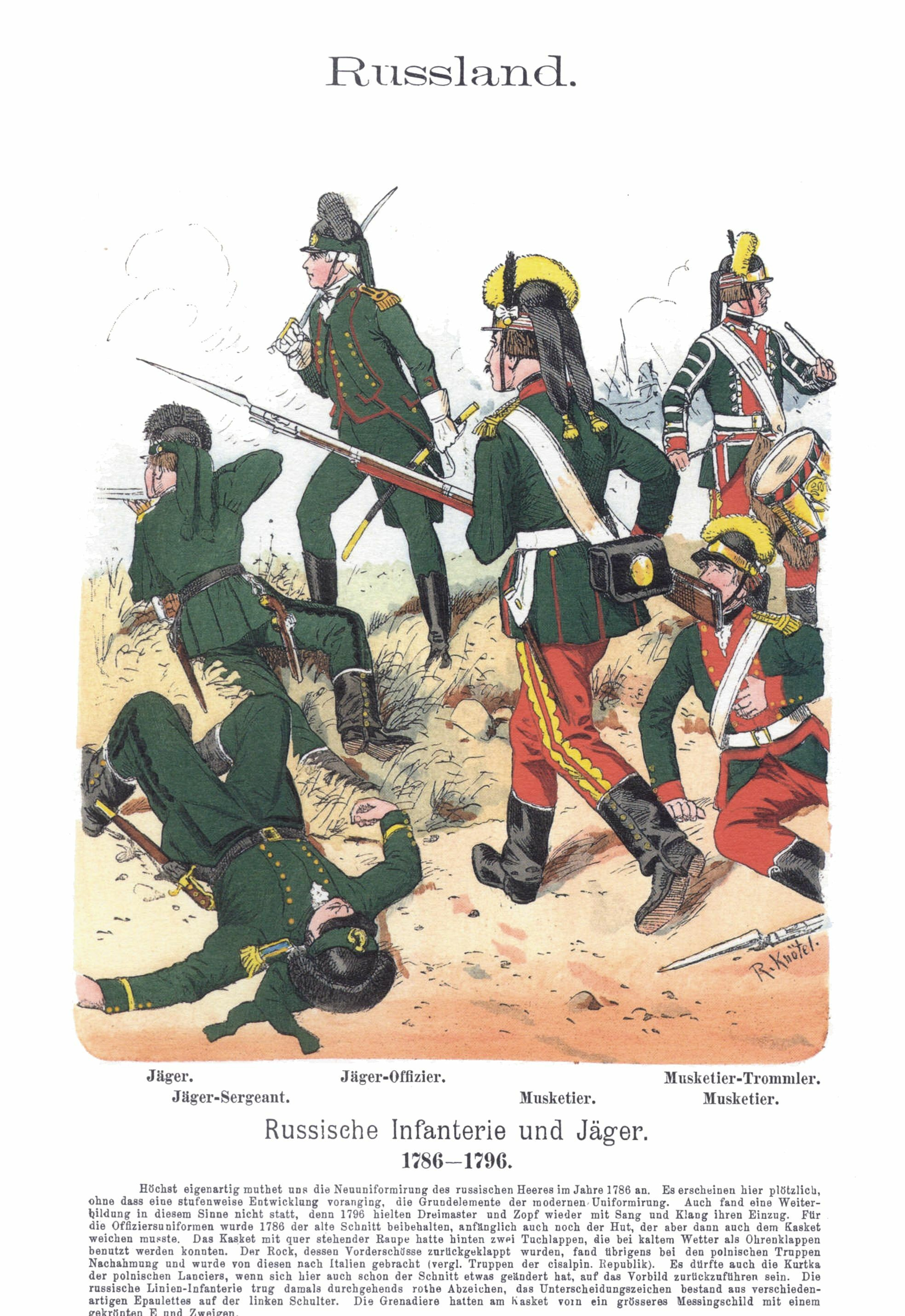
Potemkin uniforms, in service from 1786 until 1796. Russian infantry and jägers. (in German)

Eighteen months later, Potemkin reappeared, probably summoned by Catherine. Upon his return, "the man once known as Alcibiades for his wit and beauty was re-nicknamed 'Cyclops'." He became an army paymaster and oversaw uniform production. Shortly thereafter, he became a Guardian of Exotic Peoples at the new All-Russian Legislative Commission, a significant political post. In September 1768, Potemkin became Kammerherr (chamberlain). Two months later Catherine had his military commission revoked, fully attaching him to court. In the interval, the Ottoman Empire had started the Russo-Turkish War of 1768 to 1774 and Potemkin was eager to prove himself, writing to Catherine:

The only way I can express my gratitude to Your Majesty is to shed my blood for Your glory. This war provides an excellent opportunity for this and I cannot live in idleness. Allow me now, Merciful Sovereign, to appeal at Your Majesty's feet and request Your Majesty to send me to... the front in whatever rank Your Majesty wishes... [to serve] just for the duration of the war.

— Potemkin, Correspondence, dated May 1769.

Potemkin served as Major General of the cavalry. He distinguished himself in his first engagement, helping to repulse a band of unruly Tatar and Turkish horsemen. He fought in Russia's victory at the Battle of Kamenets and the taking of the town. Potemkin saw action virtually every day, particularly excelling at the Battle of Prashkovsky, after which his commander Aleksandr Mikhailovich Golitsyn recommended him to Catherine. Potemkin's army, under Pyotr Rumyantsev, continued its advance. Potemkin fought at the capture of Jurja, a display of courage and skill for which he received the Order of St. Anna. At the Battle of Larga, he won the Order of St. George, third class, and fought well during the rout of the main Turkish force that followed. On leave to Saint Petersburg, the Empress invited him to dine with her more than ten times.

Back at the front, Potemkin won more military acclaim, but then fell ill; rejecting medicine, he recovered only slowly. After a lull in hostilities in 1772 his movements are unclear, but it seems that he returned to Saint Petersburg where he is recorded, perhaps apocryphally, to have been one of Catherine's closest advisers. Though Orlov was replaced as her favourite, it was not Potemkin who benefited. Alexander Vasilchikov, another Horse-Guardsman, replaced Orlov as the queen's lover. Potemkin returned to war in 1773 as Lieutenant-General to fight in Silistria, participating in the siege of the city. It appears that Catherine missed him, and that Potemkin took a December letter from her as a summons. In any case Potemkin returned to Saint Petersburg as a war hero.

=== Favourite of Catherine II ===
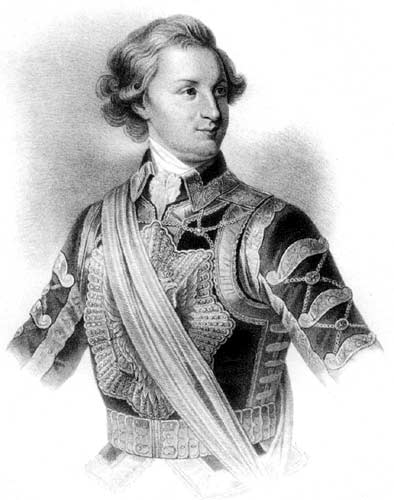
A probably later portrait of a 35-year-old Potemkin at the height of his love affair with Catherine

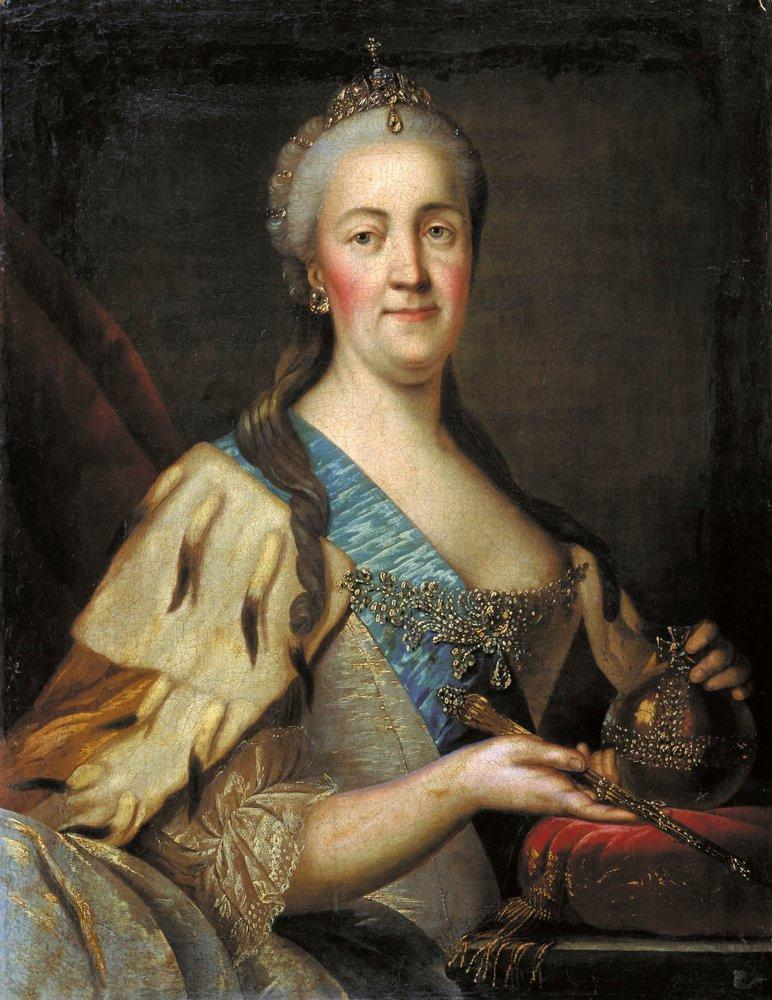
The Empress Catherine (45) at around the same time

Potemkin returned to court in January 1774 expecting to walk into Catherine's arms. The political situation, however, had become complex. Yemelyan Pugachev had just arisen as a pretender to the throne, and commanded a rebel army thirty thousand strong. In addition, Catherine's son Paul turned eighteen and began to gain his own support. By late January Potemkin had tired of the impasse and effected (perhaps with encouragement from Catherine) a "melodramatic retreat" into the Alexander Nevsky Monastery. Catherine relented and had Potemkin brought back in early February 1774, when their relationship became intimate.

Several weeks later he had usurped Vasilchikov as Catherine's favourite, and was given the title of Adjutant General. When Catherine's friend Friedrich Melchior, Baron von Grimm, objected to Vasilchikov's dismissal, she wrote back to him, "Why do you reproach me because I dismiss a well-meaning but extremely boring bourgeois in favour of one of the greatest, the most comical and amusing, characters of this iron century?" His uncouth behavior shocked the court, but Potemkin showed himself capable of suitable formality when necessary.

The frequent letters the pair sent to each other survive, revealing their affair to be one of "laughter, sex, mutually admired intelligence, and power". Many of their trysts seem to have centered around the banya sauna in the basement of the Winter Palace; Potemkin soon grew so jealous that Catherine had to detail her prior love-life for him. Potemkin also rose in political stature, particularly on the strength of his military advice. In March 1774, he became Lieutenant Colonel in the Preobrazhensky Guards, a post previously held by Alexei Orlov. He also became captain of the Chevaliers-Gardes from 1784.

In quick succession he won appointment as Governor-General of Novorossiya, as a member of the State Council, as General-in-Chief, as vice-president of the College of War and as Commander-in-Chief of the Cossacks. These posts made him rich, and he lived lavishly. To improve his social standing he was awarded the prestigious Order of St. Alexander Nevsky and Order of St. Andrew, along with the Polish Order of the White Eagle, the Prussian Order of the Black Eagle, the Danish Order of the Elephant and the Swedish Royal Order of the Seraphim.

That Catherine and Potemkin married is "almost certain", according to Simon Sebag Montefiore, although biographer Virginia Rounding has expressed some doubts. In December 1784, Catherine first explicitly referred to Potemkin as her husband in correspondence, though 1775, 1784, and 1791 have all been suggested as possible nuptial dates. In all, Catherine's phrasing in 22 letters suggested he had become her consort, at least secretly. Potemkin's actions and her treatment of him later in life fit with this: the two at least acted as husband and wife.

By late 1775, their relationship was changing, though it is uncertain exactly when Catherine took a secretary, Pyotr Zavadovsky, as a lover. On 2 January 1776, Zavadovsky became Adjutant General to the Empress (he became her official favorite in May) and Potemkin moved to command the Saint Petersburg troop division. Signs of a potential "golden adieu" for Potemkin include his 1776 appointment, at Catherine's request, to the title of Prince of the Holy Roman Empire.

Though he was "bored" with Catherine, the separation was relatively peaceful. The Prince was sent on a tour to Novgorod, but, contrary to the expectations of some onlookers (though not Catherine's), he returned a few weeks later. He then snubbed her gift of the Anichkov Palace, and took new apartments in the Winter Palace, retaining his posts. Though no longer Catherine's favorite, he remained her favored minister.

Though the love affair appeared to end, Catherine and Potemkin maintained a particularly close friendship, which continued to dominate their lives. Most of the time this meant a love triangle in the court between the pair and Catherine's latest swain. The favorite had a high-pressure position: after Zavadovsky came Semyon Zorich (May 1777 to May 1778), Ivan Rimsky-Korsakov (May 1778 to late 1778), Alexander Lanskoy (1780–1784), Alexander Yermolov (1785–1786), Alexander Dmitriev-Mamonov (1786–1789) and Platon Zubov (1789–1796). Potemkin checked candidates for their suitability; it also appears that he tended to the relationships and "filled in" between favorites. Potemkin also arranged for Catherine to walk in on Rimsky-Korsakov in a compromising position with another woman. During Catherine's (comparatively) long relationship with Lanskoy, Potemkin was particularly able to turn his attentions to other matters. He embarked upon a long series of other romances, including with his own nieces, one of whom may have borne him a child.

=== Diplomat ===
Potemkin's first task during this period was foreign policy. An Anglophile, he helped negotiate with the English ambassador, Sir James Harris, during Catherine's initiative of Armed Neutrality, though the south remained his passion. His plan, known as the Greek Project, aspired to build a new Byzantine Empire around the Turkish capital in Constantinople. Dismembering the Ottoman Empire would require détente with Austria (technically still the Habsburg monarchy), and its ruler Joseph II. They met in May 1780 in the Russian town of Mogilev. The ensuing alliance represented the triumph of Potemkin's approach over courtiers such as Catherine's son Paul, who favored alliance with Prussia. The May 1781 defensive treaty remained secret for almost two years; the Ottomans were said to still have been unaware of it even when they declared war on Russia in 1787.

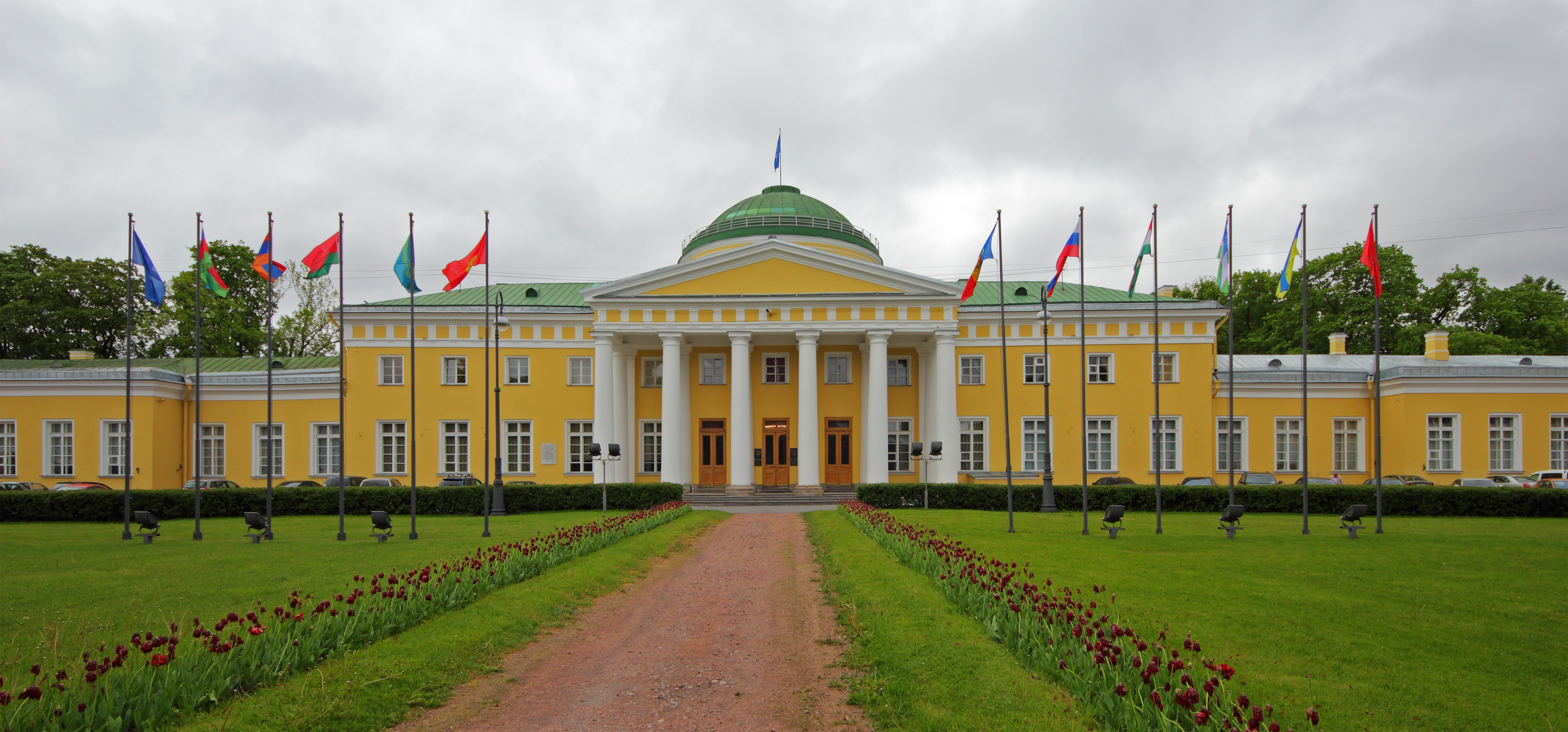
Potemkin's Tauride Palace in St. Petersburg

Elsewhere, Potemkin's scheme to develop a Russian presence in the rapidly disintegrating state of Persia failed. Plans for a full-scale invasion had previously been cut back and a small unit sent to establish a trading post there was quickly turned away. Potemkin focused instead on Russia's southern provinces, where he was busy founding cities (including Sevastopol) and creating his own personal kingdom, including his brand new Black Sea Fleet. That kingdom was about to expand: under the Treaty of Kuçuk Kainarji, which had ended the previous Russo-Turkish war, the Crimean Khanate had become independent, though effectively under Russian control. In June 1782 it was descending again into anarchy.

By July 1783, Potemkin had engineered the peaceful annexation of Crimea and Kuban, capitalizing on the fact that Britain and France were fighting elsewhere. The Kingdom of Kartli-Kakheti accepted Russian protection a few days later with the Treaty of Georgievsk searching for protection against Persia's aim to reestablish its suzerainty over Georgia; the Karabakh Khanate of Persia initially looked as though it might also, but eventually declined Russian help. Exhausted, Potemkin collapsed into a fever he barely survived. Catherine rewarded him with one hundred thousand roubles, which he used to construct the Tauride Palace in Saint Petersburg.

=== Governor-General and city builder ===
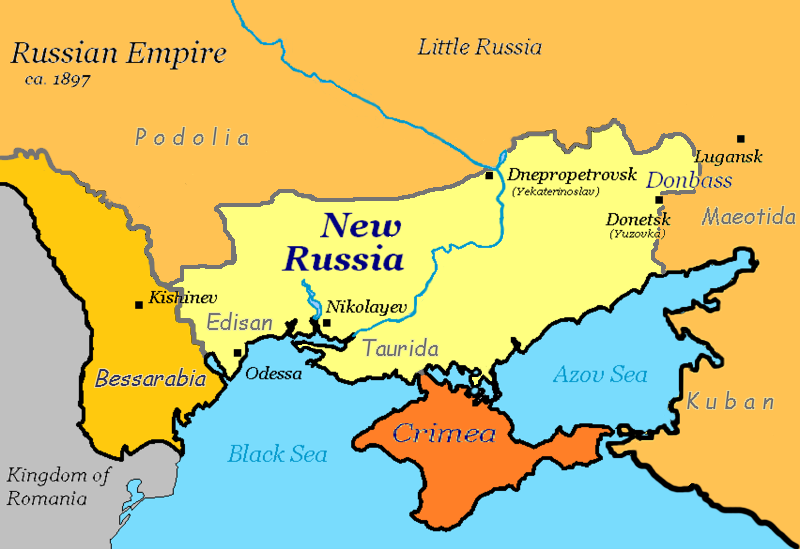
The approximate extent of Novorossiya by Potemkin's death in 1791

Potemkin returned to St. Petersburg in November 1783 and was promoted to Field Marshal when Crimea was formally annexed the following February. He also became President of the College of War. The province of Taurida (Crimea) was added to the state of Novorossiya (lit. New Russia). Potemkin moved south in mid-March, as the "Prince of Taurida" or "Potemkin-Tauricheski". He had been the namestnik of Russia's southern provinces (including Novorossiya, Azov, Saratov, Astrakhan, and the Caucasus) since 1774, repeatedly expanding the domain via military action. He kept his own court, which rivalled Catherine's: by the 1780s he operated a chancellery with fifty or more clerks and had his own minister, Vasili Popov, to oversee day-to-day affairs. Another favored associate was Mikhail Faleev.

The "criminal" breaking of the Cossack hosts, particularly the Zaporozhian Cossacks in 1775, helped define his rule. However, Montefiore argues that given their location, and in the wake of the Pugachev rebellion, the Cossacks were likely doomed in any case. By the time of Potemkin's death, the Cossacks and their threat of anarchic revolt were well controlled. Among the Zaporizhian Cossacks he was known as Hrytsko Nechesa.

==== Builder ====
Potemkin then embarked on a period of city-founding. Construction started at his first effort, Kherson, in 1778, as a base for a new Black Sea Fleet he intended to build. Potemkin approved every plan himself, but construction was slow, and the city proved costly and vulnerable to plague. Next was the port of Akhtiar, annexed with Crimea, which became Sevastopol. Then he built Simferopol as the Crimean capital. His biggest failure, however, was his effort to build the city of Yekaterinoslav (lit. 'glory of Catherine'), now the city of Dnipro. (Note: A previous town with the same founded in 1775 but in a badly chosen location was duly renamed Novomskovsk.) The second most successful city of Potemkin's rule was Nikolayev (now Mykolaiv), which he founded in 1789. Potemkin also initiated the redesign of Odessa after its capture from the Turks; it was to turn out to be his greatest city planning triumph.

Potemkin's Black Sea Fleet was a massive undertaking for its time. By 1787, the British ambassador reported twenty-seven ships of the line. It put Russia on a naval footing with Spain, though far behind the Royal Navy. The period represented the peak of Russia's naval power relative to other European states. Potemkin also rewarded hundreds of thousands of settlers who moved into his territories. It is estimated that by 1782 the populations of Novorossiya and Azov had doubled during a period of "exceptionally rapid" development. Immigrants included Russians, foreigners, British convicts diverted from Australia, Cossacks and controversially Jews. Though the immigrants were not always happy in their new surroundings, on at least one occasion Potemkin intervened directly to ensure families received the cattle to which they were entitled. Outside of Novorossiya he drew up the Azov-Mozdok defense line, constructing forts at Georgievsk, Stavropol, and elsewhere and ensured that the whole of the line was settled.

In 1784, Alexander Lanskoy died and Potemkin was needed at court to console the grieving Catherine. After Alexander Yermolov was installed as the new favorite in 1785, Catherine, Yermolov and Potemkin cruised the upper Volga. When Yermolov attempted to unseat Potemkin (and attracted support from Potemkin's critics), he found himself replaced by Count Alexander Dmitriev-Mamonov in the summer of 1786. Potemkin returned to the south, having arranged that Catherine would visit in the summer of 1787. She reached Kiev in late January, to travel down the Dnieper after the ice had melted (see Crimean journey of Catherine the Great). Potemkin had other lovers at this time, including a 'Countess' Sevres and a Naryshkina. Leaving in April, the royal party arrived in Kherson a month later. On visiting Sevastopol, Austria's Joseph II, who was traveling with them, was moved to note that "The Empress is totally ecstatic... Prince Potemkin is at the moment all-powerful".

==== "Potemkin village" ====
The notion of the Potemkin village, coined in German by critical biographer Georg von Helbig as German: Potemkinsche Dörfer, arose from Catherine's visit to the south. Critics accused Potemkin of using painted façades to fool Catherine into thinking that the area was far richer than it was. Thousands of peasants were alleged to have been stage-managed for this purpose. Certainly, Potemkin had arranged for Catherine to see the best he had to offer, organizing numerous exotic excursions, and at least two cities' officials concealed poverty by building false houses. It seems unlikely that the fraud approached the scale alleged. The Prince of Ligne, a member of the Austrian delegation, who had explored on his own during the trip, later proclaimed the allegations to be false.

=== Commander-in-Chief ===
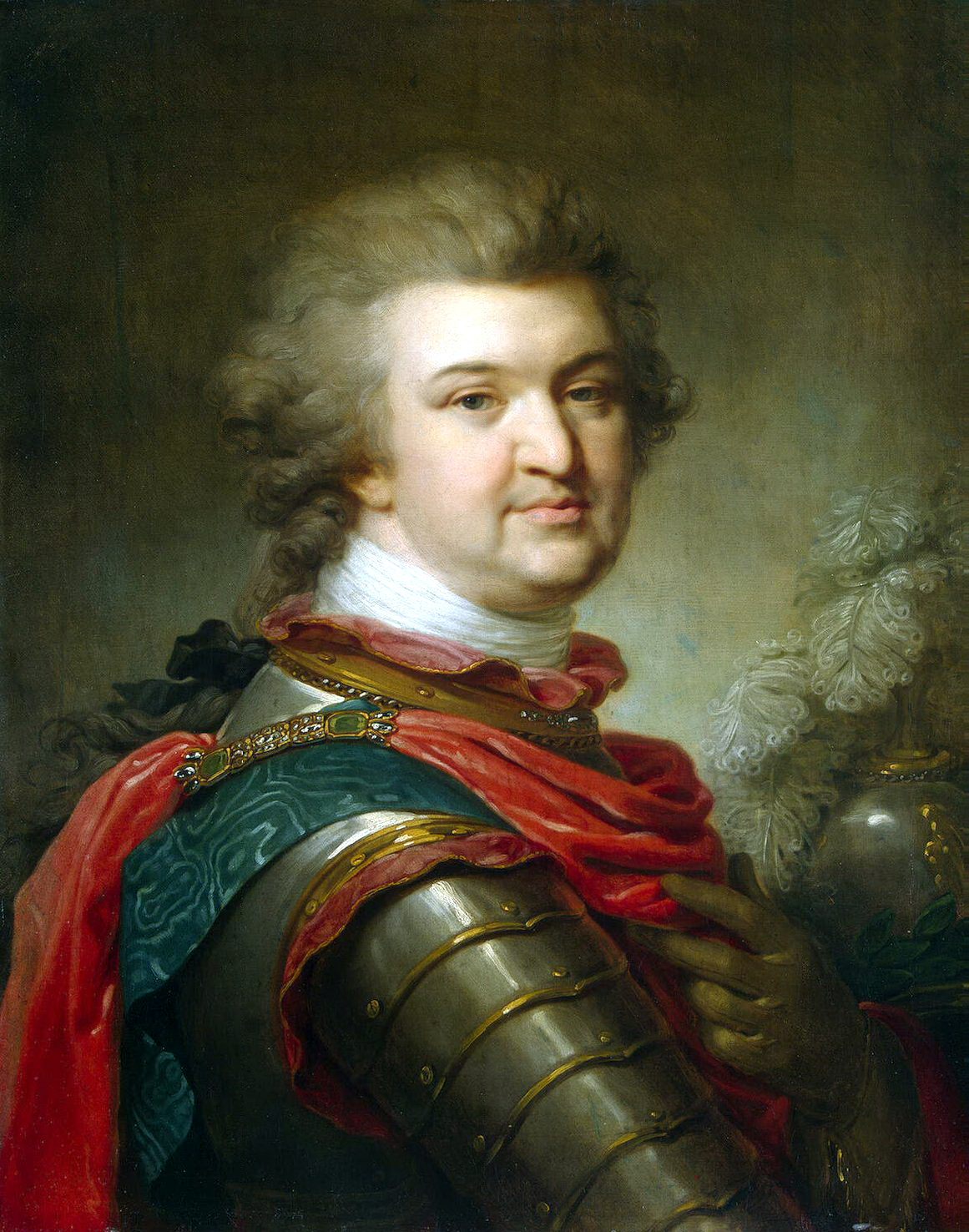
Potemkin in the knightly armour, 1790s, by Johann Baptist von Lampi the Elder. Once believed to be a lifetime likeness, this portrait is now considered posthumous.

Potemkin remained in the south, gradually sinking into depression. His inactivity was problematic, given that he was now Russia's commander-in-chief and, in August 1787, another Russo-Turkish war broke out, the second of Potemkin's lifetime. His opponents were anxious to reclaim the lands they had lost in the last war, and they were under pressure from Prussia, Britain, and Sweden to take a hostile attitude towards Russia. Potemkin's bluster had probably contributed to the hostility, either deliberately or accidentally. Either way, his creation of the new fleet and Catherine's trip to the south had certainly not helped matters. In the center, Potemkin had his own Yekaterinoslav Army, while to the west lay the smaller Ukraine Army under the command of Field Marshal Rumyantsev-Zadunaisky. On water he had the Black Sea Fleet, and Potemkin was also responsible for coordinating military actions with Russia's Austrian allies.

Potemkin and Catherine agreed on a primarily defensive strategy until the spring. Though the Turks were repelled in early skirmishes against the Russian fortress at Kinburn, news of the loss of Potemkin's beloved fleet during a storm sent him into a deep depression. A week later, and after kind words from Catherine, he was rallied by the news that the fleet was not destroyed, but only damaged. General Alexander Suvorov won an important victory at Kinburn in early October. With winter now approaching, Potemkin was confident the port would be safe until the spring.

Turning his attention elsewhere, Potemkin established his headquarters in Elisabethgrad and planned future operations. He assembled an army of forty or fifty thousand, including the newly formed Kuban Cossacks. He divided his time between military preparation (creating a fleet of a hundred gunboats to fight within the shallow liman) and chasing the wives of soldiers under his command. Meanwhile, the Austrians remained on the defensive across central Europe, though they did manage to hold their lines. Despite advice to the contrary, Potemkin pursued an equally defensive strategy, though in the Caucasus, Generals Tekeeli and Pavel Potemkin were making some inroads.

In early summer 1788, fighting intensified as Potemkin's forces won their naval confrontation with the Turks with few losses, and began the siege of Ochakov, a Turkish stronghold and the main Russian war aim. Less promising was that Saint Petersburg, exposed after Russia's best forces departed for Crimea, was now under threat from Sweden in the Russo-Swedish War of 1788–1790. Potemkin refused to write regularly with news of the war in the south, compounding Catherine's anxiety.

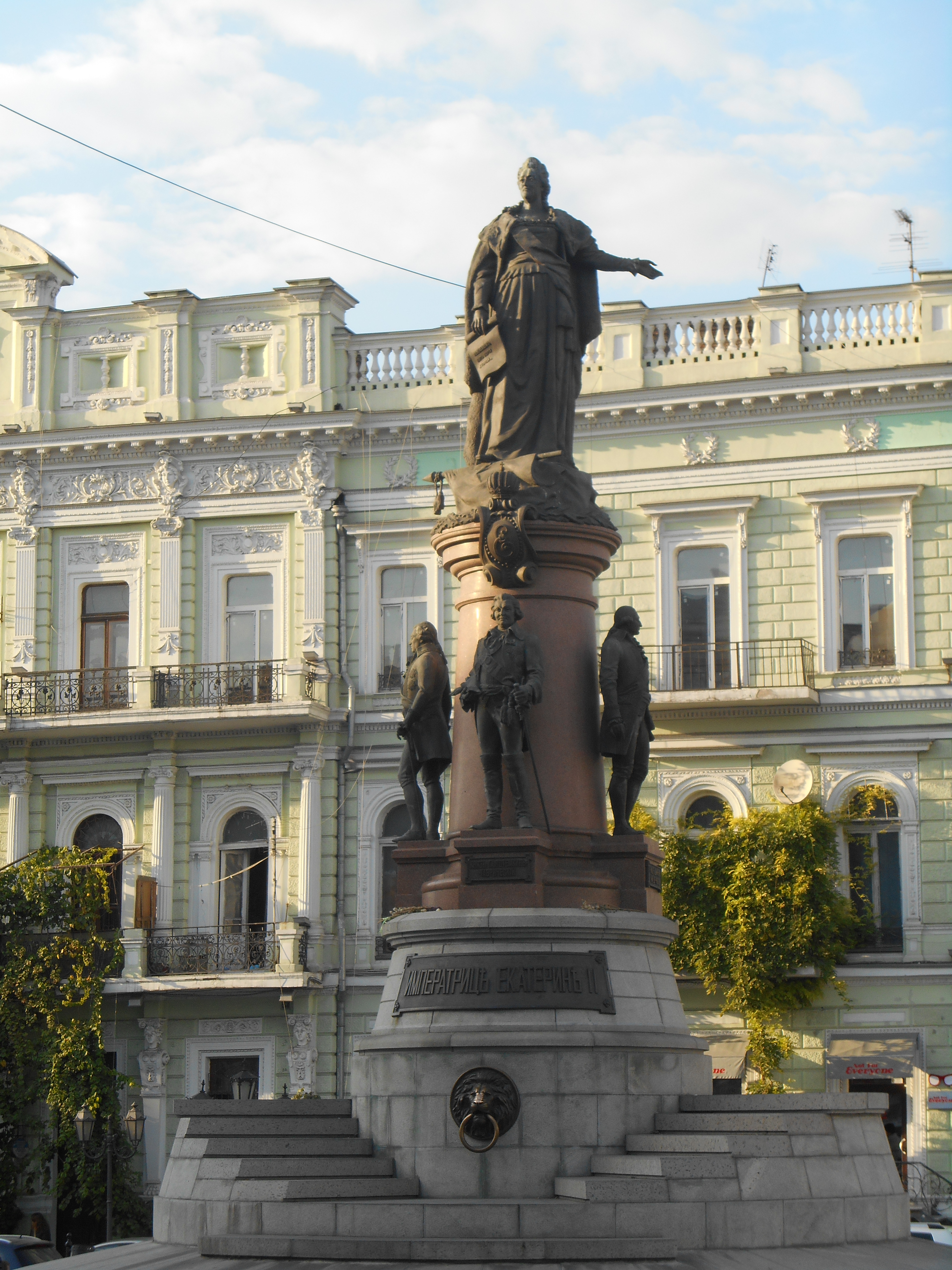
Monument to the founders of Odessa in Odesa, Ukraine

Potemkin argued with Suvorov and Catherine herself, who were both anxious to assault Ochakov, which the Turks twice managed to supply by sea. Finally, on 6 December, the assault began and four hours later the city was taken, a coup for Potemkin. Nearly ten thousand Turks had been killed at a cost of (only) two-and-a-half thousand Russians. Catherine wrote that "you [Potemkin] have shut the mouths of everyone... [and can now] show magnanimity to your blind and empty-headed critics".

Potemkin then visited the naval yard at Vitovka, founded Nikolayev, and traveled on to St. Petersburg, arriving in February 1789. In May, he left once more for the front, having agreed on contingency plans with Catherine should Russia be forced into war with either Prussia or the upstart Poland, which had recently successfully demanded the withdrawal of Russian troops from its territory. (Catherine herself was just about to change favorites for the final time, replacing Dmitriev-Mamonov with Platon Zubov.) Back on the Turkish front, Potemkin advanced towards the fortress of Bender on the Dniester River.

The summer and autumn of 1789 saw numerous victories against the Turks, including the Battle of Focşani in July; in early September, the Battle of Rymnik and the capture of both Kaushany and Hadjibey (modern-day Odesa); and finally the surrender of the Turkish fortress at Akkerman in late September. The massive fortress at Bender surrendered in November without a fight. (Note: Under the terms of the surrender, the garrison was allowed to leave unharmed, but three hundred guns were captured by the Russians in the process.) Potemkin opened up a lavish court at Iași, the capital of Moldavia, to "winter like a sultan, revel in his mistresses, build his towns, create his regiments—and negotiate peace with [the Turks]... he was emperor of all he surveyed". Potemkin even established a newspaper, Le Courrier de Moldavie. His preferred lover at the time—though he had others—was Praskovia Potemkina, an affair which continued into 1790. Potemkin renamed two ships in her honor. As part of the diplomatic machinations, Potemkin was given the new title of "Grand Hetman of the Black Sea and Yekaterinoslav Cossack Hosts" and in March he assumed personal control of the Black Sea fleet as Grand Admiral.

Potemkin's forces succeeded in advancing deep into Ottoman territory, capturing the fortress at Izmail (lower left). The ultimate result of the war would be the ceding of the land between the Bug and Dniester rivers (striped) to Russia.

In July 1790, the Russian Baltic Fleet was defeated by the Swedish at the Battle of Svensksund. Despite the damage, the silver lining for the Russians was that the Swedes now felt able to negotiate on an even footing and a peace was soon signed (Treaty of Värälä on 14 August 1790) based on the status quo ante bellum, thus ending the threat of invasion. The peace also freed up military resources for the war against the Turks. Potemkin had moved his ever more lavish court to Bender and there were soon more successes against Turkey, including the capture of Batal-Pasha and, on the second attempt, of Kiliya on the Danube. By the end of November, only one major target remained: the Turkish fortress of Izmail. At Potemkin's request, General Suvorov commanded the assault, which proved to be costly but effective. The victory was commemorated by Russia's first, albeit unofficial, national anthem, "Let the thunder of victory sound!", written by Gavrila Derzhavin and Osip Kozlovsky.

After two years, he returned to Saint Petersburg to face the threat of war against an Anglo-Prussian coalition in addition to the war with Turkey. His return was widely celebrated with the "Carnival of Prince Potemkin". The Prince came across as polite and charming though his latest mistress, Princess Ekaterina Dolgorukaya, appeared sidelined, (Note: Dolgorukaya was soon replaced by a new mistress, Sophie (de) Witte (nicknamed "The Beautiful Greek"), who was renowned in the courts of Europe at that time and had an accommodating husband.) and Potemkin found himself embroiled in court intrigue whilst trying to force Zubov out. Catherine and Potemkin fought over military strategy; the Empress wanted no compromise, while Potemkin wanted to buy time by appeasing the Prussians.

Fortunately for the Russians, the Anglo-Prussian alliance collapsed and a British ultimatum that Russia should accept the status quo ante bellum was withdrawn. In this way, the threat of a wider war receded. Though Russia was still at war with the Ottomans, Potemkin's focus was now Poland. Potemkin had conservative allies including Felix Potocki, whose schemes were so diverse that they have yet to be fully untangled. For example, one idea was for Potemkin to declare himself king.

Success on the Turkish front continued, mostly attributable to Potemkin. He now had the opportunity to confront the Turks and dictate a peace, but that would mean leaving Catherine. His procrastination soured Catherine's attitude towards him, a situation compounded by Potemkin's choice of the married Princess Paskovia Adreevna Golitsyna (née Shuvalova) as his latest mistress. In the end, Potemkin was given the requisite authority to negotiate with the Turks (and, afterwards, to pursue his Polish ambitions), and dispatched by Catherine back to the south. She sent a note after him, reading "Goodbye my friend, I kiss you".

=== Death ===
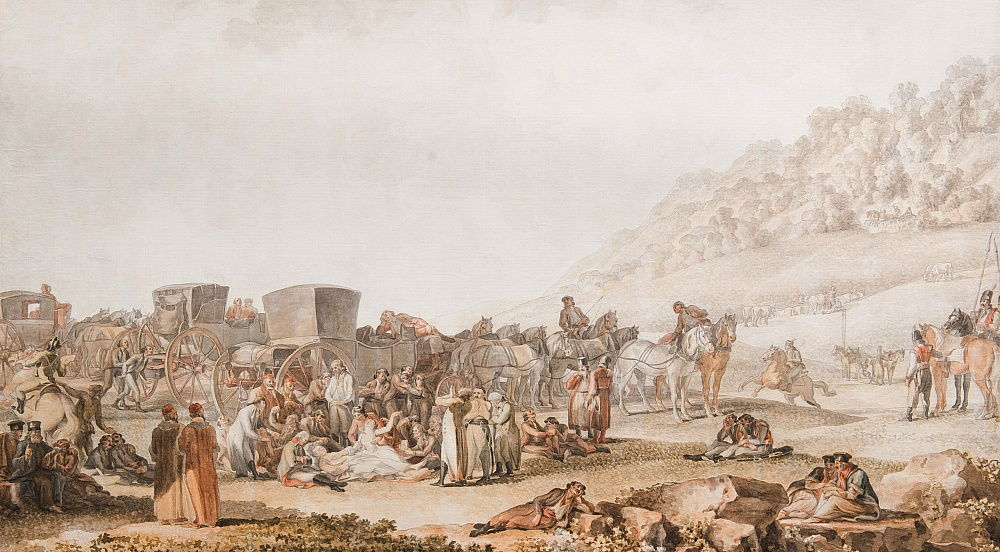
The Death of Grigory Potemkin on the Bessarabian Steppe by Mikhail Matveevich Ivanov (1791)

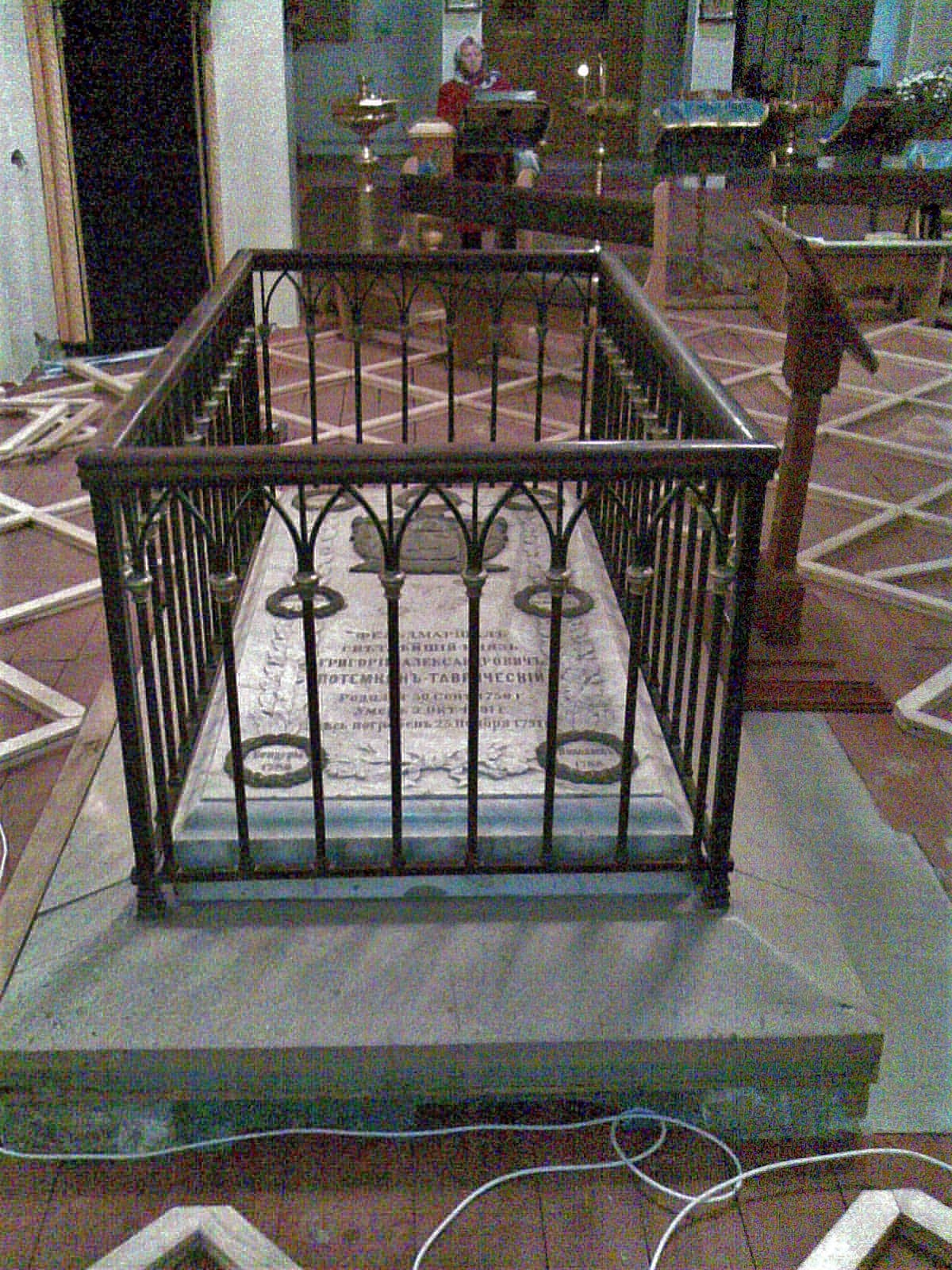
Potemkin's former grave in the Kherson Cathedral

Potemkin fell ill in the fever-ridden city of Iași, then often known as Jassy in English, although he kept busy, overseeing peace talks, (Note: The talks, which were continued by Catherine's secretary and foreign minister Alexander Bezborodko, led to the Treaty of Jassy, in which Russia annexed a significant amount of land from the Ottomans.) planning his assault on Poland, and preparing the army for renewed war in the south. He fasted briefly and recovered some strength, but refused medicine and began to feast once again, consuming a "ham, a salted goose and three or four chickens". On 13 October [O.S. 2 October], he felt better and dictated a letter to Catherine before collapsing once more. Later, he awoke and dispatched his entourage to Nikolayev. On 16 October [O.S. 5 October] 1791 Potemkin died in the open steppe, 60 km from Iași. Picking up on contemporary rumor, historians such as the Polish Jerzy Łojek have suggested that he was poisoned because his madness made him a liability, but this is rejected by Montefiore, who suggests he succumbed to bronchial pneumonia instead.

Potemkin was embalmed, and a funeral was held for him in Iași. Eight days after his death, he was buried. Catherine was distraught and ordered social life in Saint Petersburg be put on hold. Derzhavin's ode Waterfall lamented Potemkin's death. Likewise many in the military establishment had looked upon Potemkin as a father figure and were especially saddened by his demise. Polish contemporary Stanisław Małachowski claimed that Aleksandra von Engelhardt, a niece of Potemkin's and the wife of Franciszek Ksawery Branicki, a magnate and prominent leader of the Targowica Confederation, worried for the fate of Poland after the death of the man who had planned to revitalise the Polish state with himself as its new head.

Potemkin had used the state treasury as a personal bank, preventing the resolution of his financial affairs to this day. Catherine purchased the Tauride Palace and his art collection from his estate, and paid off his debts. Consequently, he left a relative fortune.

Catherine's son Paul, who succeeded to the throne in 1796, attempted to undo as many of Potemkin's reforms as possible. The Tauride Palace was turned into a barracks, and the city of Gregoripol, which had been named in Potemkin's honor, was renamed.

Potemkin's grave survived a destruction order issued by Paul and was eventually displayed by the Bolsheviks. His remains appeared to lie in his tomb at St. Catherine's Cathedral in Kherson. The exact whereabouts of some of his internal organs, including his heart and brain first kept at Golia Monastery in Iași, remain unknown. Pro-Russian officials during the Russian invasion of Ukraine said that his remains were taken from his tomb and transported to Russia. This was the ninth time that Potemkin's remains were moved.

== Personality and reputation ==
Potemkin "exuded both menace and welcome"; he was arrogant, demanding of his courtiers, and very changeable in his moods, but also fascinating, warm, and kind. It was generally agreed among his female companions that he was "amply endowed with 'sex appeal'".

Louis Philippe, comte de Ségur described him as "colossal like Russia", "an inconceivable mixture of grandeur and pettiness, laziness and activity, bravery and timidity, ambition and insouciance". The internal contrast was evident throughout his life: he frequented both church and numerous orgies, for example. In Ségur's view, onlookers had a tendency to unjustly attribute to Catherine alone the successes of the period and to Potemkin the failures. An eccentric workaholic, Potemkin was vain and a great lover of jewelry (a taste he did not always remember to pay for), but he disliked sycophancy and was sensitive about his appearance, particularly his lost eye. He only agreed to have portraits made of him twice, in 1784 and again in 1791, both times by Johann Baptist von Lampi and from an angle which disguised his injury. Potemkin was often noted for his uncouth behavior, most notably his unscrupulous sexual liaisons and biting his nails. Potemkin's nail-biting was so persistent that it was frequently noticed by courtiers and guests, and resulted in hangnail.

It is possible that Potemkin was affected by bipolar disorder. His highs and lows, his inability to follow through on his ideas, his material and sexual excesses, his impulsive whims, his energy and lethargy, and his depressive spells suggest some kind of bipolar disorder. In a time that was not aware of mental illness, Potemkin, and the people in his life such as Catherine, suffered from this lack of understanding.

Potemkin was an intellectual. The Prince of Ligne noted that Potemkin had "natural abilities [and] an excellent memory". He was interested in history, generally knowledgeable, and loved the classical music of the period, as well as opera. He liked all food, both peasant and fine, his favorites including roast beef and potatoes; while his Anglophilia meant that English gardens were prepared wherever he went. A practical politician, his political ideas were "quintessentially Russian", and he believed in the superiority of the Tsarist autocracy. He once described the French revolutionaries as "a pack of madmen". One evening, at the height of his power, Potemkin declared to his dinner guests:

Everything I have ever wanted, I have... I wanted high rank, I have it; I wanted medals, I have them; I loved gambling, I have lost vast sums; I liked giving parties, I've given magnificent ones; I enjoy building houses, I've raised palaces; I liked buying estates, I have many; I adore diamonds and beautiful things – no individual in Europe owns rarer or more exquisite stones. In a word, all my passions have been sated. I am entirely happy!

Ultimately, Potemkin proved a controversial figure. Criticisms include "laziness, corruption, debauchery, indecision, extravagance, falsification, military incompetence, and disinformation on a vast scale", but supporters hold that "the sybaritism [devotion to luxury] and extravagance... are truly justified", stressing Potemkin's "intelligence, force of personality, spectacular vision, courage, generosity and great achievements". Although not a military genius, he was "seriously able" in military matters. Potemkin's contemporary Ségur was quick to criticise, writing that "nobody thought out a plan more swiftly [than Potemkin], carried it out more slowly and abandoned it more easily". Another contemporary, the Scotsman Sir John Sinclair, added that Potemkin had "great abilities" but was ultimately a "worthless and dangerous character". Russian opponents such as Semyon Vorontsov agreed: the Prince had "lots of intelligence, intrigue and credit", but lacked "knowledge, application and virtue".

== Family ==
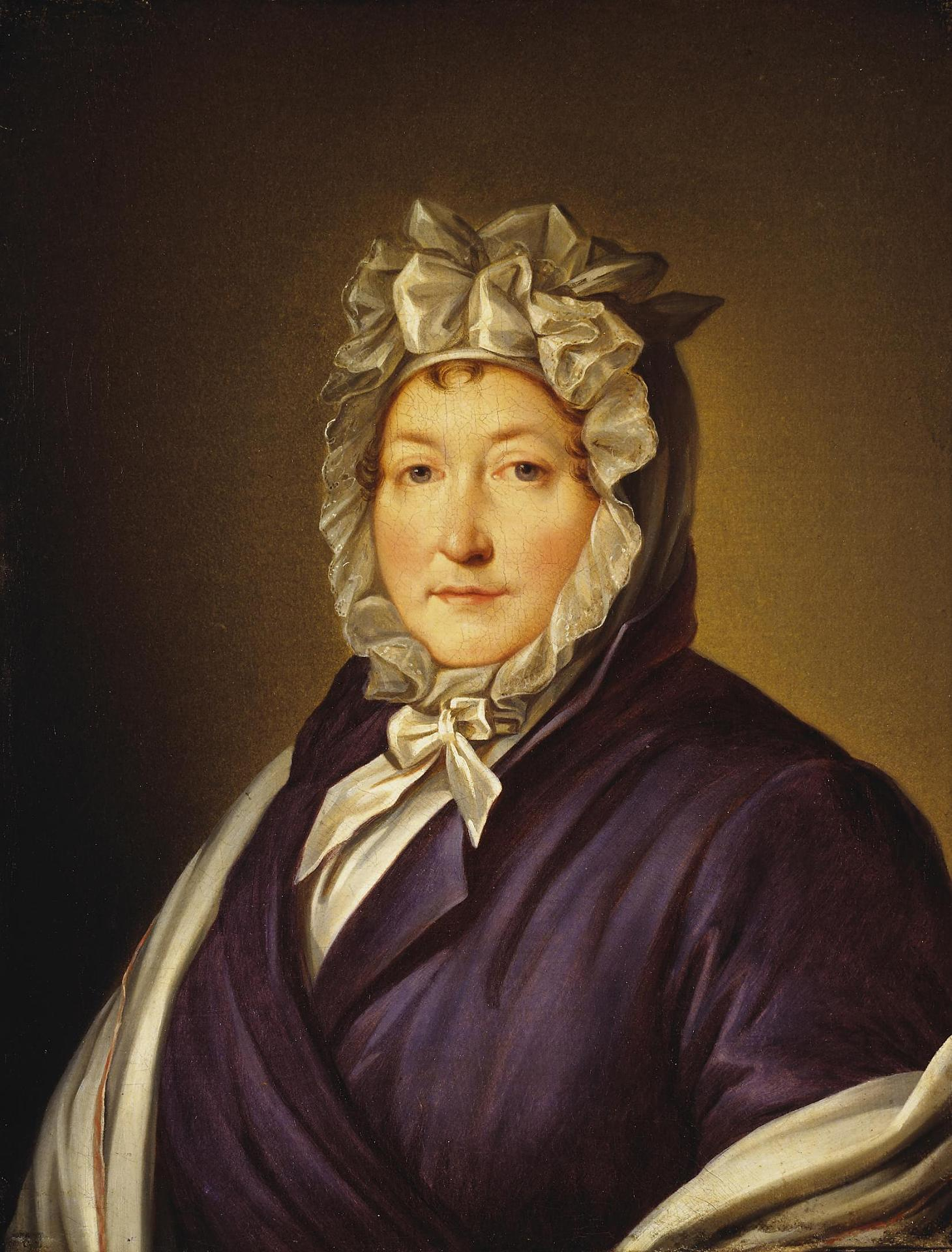
Varvara Galitzine (née Engelhardt), one of Potemkin's favourite nieces and at one time also his lover

Potemkin had no legitimate descendants, though it is probable he had illegitimate issue. Elizabeth Temkina was the once-alleged daughter of Catherine the Great and Grigory Potemkin.

Four of his five sisters lived long enough to bear children, but only the daughters of his sister Marfa Elena (sometimes rendered as 'Helen') received Potemkin's special attention. The five unmarried Engelhardt sisters arrived in court in 1775 on the direction of their recently widowed father Vassily. Legend suggests Potemkin soon seduced many of the girls, one of whom was twelve or thirteen at the time. An affair with the third eldest, Varvara, can be verified; after that had subsided, Potemkin formed close—and probably amorous—relationships successively with Alexandra, the second eldest, and Ekaterina, the fifth.

Potemkin also had influential relatives. Potemkin's sister Maria, for example, married Russian senator Nikolay Samoylov: their son Alexander was decorated for his service under Potemkin in the army; their daughter Ekaterina married first into the Raevsky family, and then the wealthy landowner Lev Davydov. She had children with both husbands, including highly decorated General Nikolay Raevsky, Potemkin's great-nephew. His wider family included several distant cousins, among them Count Pavel Potemkin, another decorated military figure, whose brother Mikhail married Potemkin's niece Tatiana Engelhardt. A distant nephew, Felix Yusupov, helped murder Rasputin in 1916.

== Legacy ==
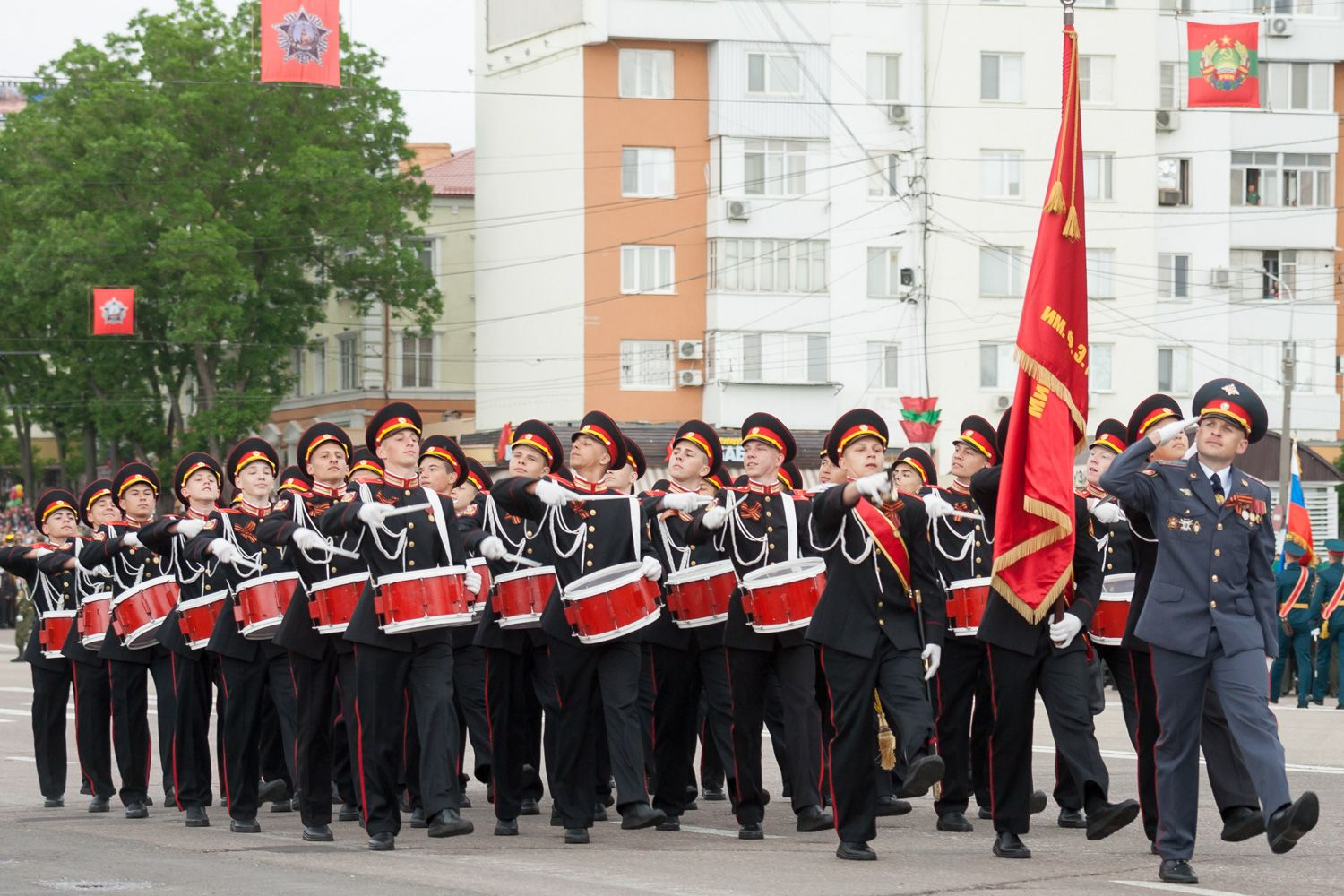
The corps of drums of the Potemkin Republican Cadet Corps

Despite attempts by Paul I to play down Potemkin's role in Russian history, his name found its way into numerous items of common parlance:

- A century after Potemkin's death, the Battleship Potemkin was named in his honour. The ship became famous for its involvement in the Russian Revolution of 1905 and subsequent dramatization in Battleship Potemkin, a Soviet movie by Sergey Eisenstein, which at one point was named the greatest film of all time.
- The name of the giant seaside staircase in Odesa, featured in The Battleship Potemkin, eventually became known as the Potemkin Stairs.
- The phrase Potemkin village entered common usage in Russia and globally, despite its fictional origin.
- The Grigory Potemkin Republican Cadet Corps is a specialized institution in the Ministry of Internal Affairs of Transnistria that is named after the Russian prince.

== Sources ==
- Kaus, Gina (1935). Catherine: Portrait of an Empress. Viking.
- Lieven, Dominic (2003). Empire: The Russian Empire and Its Rivals. Pimlico. ISBN 978-0-7126-0546-5.
- Łojek, Jerzy (1986). Geneza i obalenie Konstytucji 3 Maja (in Polish). Wyd.Lubelskie. ISBN 978-83-222-0313-2.
- Montefiore, Simon Sebag (4 October 2001). Prince of Princes: The Life of Potemkin. London: Weidenfeld & Nicolson. ISBN 978-1-84212-438-3.
- Pascu, Giorge (1940). Calatori straini în Moldova si Muntenia în secolul XVIII : Carra, Bauer si Struve (in Romanian). Iași: Institutul de Arte Grafice "Bravo".
- Rounding, Virginia (2006). Catherine the Great. London: Hutchinson. ISBN 978-0-09-179992-2.
- Smith, Douglas (ed. and tr.), Love and Conquest: Personal Correspondence of Catherine the Great and Prince Grigory Potemkin (DeKalb, Northern Illinois University Press, 2004).
- Soloveytchik, George (1938). Potemkin. Taylor & Francis.
