= Alexander Kokorinov =

Russian architect and educator

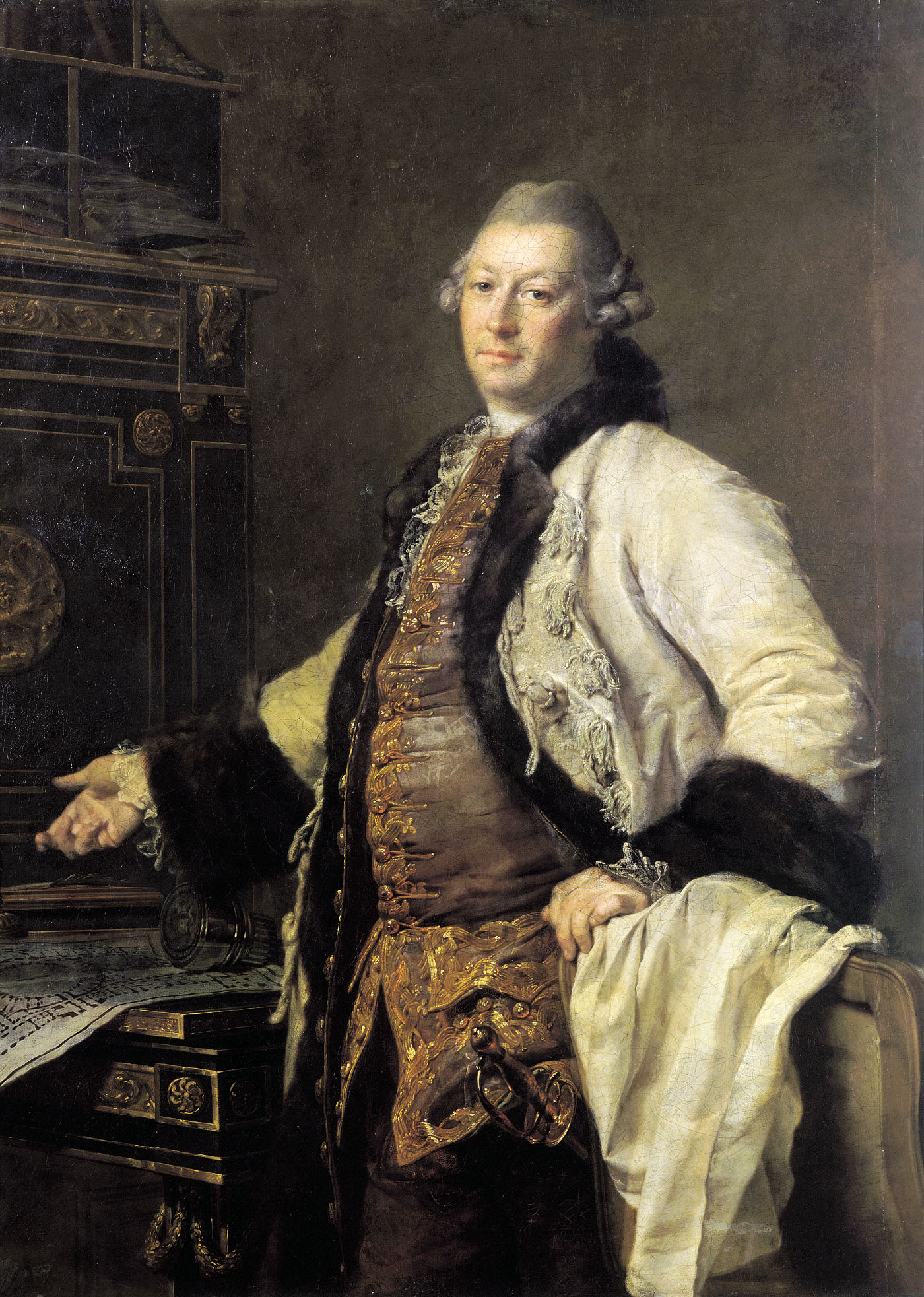
Dmitry Levitsky, Alexander Kokorinov, 1769, oils; Russian Museum, Saint Petersburg

Alexander Filippovich Kokorinov (Russian: Алекса́ндр Фили́ппович Коко́ринов; 10 July 1726 – 21 March 1772) was a Russian architect and educator of Siberian origin, generally remembered for his role in establishing the Imperial Academy of Arts in Saint Peterburg, of which he was the official builder and then administrator from 1758 until his death. Kokorinov has been house architect of the Razumovsky family and Ivan Shuvalov, the founding president of the Academy. Kokorinov's surviving architectural legacy, once believed to be substantial, has been reduced by recent research to only two buildings, the Imperial Academy of Arts and Kirill Razumovsky palace in Saint Petersburg. The Academy was designed by Jean-Baptiste Vallin de la Mothe based on an earlier proposal by Jacques-François Blondel, while Kokorinov managed the construction in its early phases (1764–1772).

== Biography ==
=== Early years and family ===
Alexander Kokorinov was born in Tobolsk in the family of a government clerk. His grandfather was a priest. At the age of 14 Alexander began training with Johann Blank (father of Karl Blank), a self-proclaimed architect exiled from Saint Petersburg for his involvement in the alleged conspiracy of Artemy Volynsky (1740). With the ascension of Elisabeth in 1741 survivors of the Volynsky affair were amnestied and the Blanks returned to Moscow, taking Kokorinov with them.

=== Education ===
After the death of Johann Blank, in 1745 Alexander Kokorinov and Karl Blank studied arts and architecture in Moscow under Dmitry Ukhtomsky, then the leading Moscow architect of Elisabethan Baroque and dean of an architectural school based in Moscow Kremlin. Soon Kokorinov was invited into the group of Ivan Korobov, where the young architect gave such a good account of himself that was promoted by the master and in 1749 was awarded the title of apprentice. This title allowed Kokorinov to build and take private orders by himself.

In this post Kokorinov also was in charge of reconstruction and restoration of the Moscow Kremlin towers and walls. Soon the architect's reputation was that good that even hetman Kirill Razumovski hired him to work on his Petrovskoe estate.

He received the degree of Master of Mathematics from Moscow University and in 1754 Kokorinov passed professional examination as a junior architect, joined the staff of Francesco Bartolomeo Rastrelli and relocated to Saint Petersburg where he made contact with count Ivan Shuvalov, founder of Moscow State University (1755) and the Imperial Academy of Arts (1757). Kokorinov joined the staff of the Academy since its first days.

=== Career ===
Shuvalov initially proposed to set up the Academy in Moscow and commissioned Jacques-François Blondel to design the new campus there. Empress Elisabeth insisted that the Academy must be based in Saint Petersburg, and the task of adapting Blondel's plans was awarded to Kokorinov, who has already designed Shuvalov's own house in Saint Petersburg. Kokorinov, firmly trained only in Baroque styling, struggled with Blondel's French neoclassical design and in 1759 Shuvalov hired another Frenchman to assist Kokorinov. Jean-Baptiste Vallin de la Mothe, Blondel's cousin and a recent graduate of the Royal Academy of Architecture, became Kokorinov's peer on the Academy project and soon surpassed him. Design of the building is traditionally credited by Kokorinov and de la Mothe, but recent research in French archives indicate that it was de la Mothe's own work, while no drafts by Kokorinov were ever found. The Academy, a complex structure measuring 140 by 125 meters, bears traces of Blondel's style yet, according to Dmitry Shvidkovsky, "is more up to date ... especially noticeable in plan. Where Blondel specified a corinthian order, the stricter Roman Doric was actually used. The cupola too is more laconic than as designed by Blondel. The complete building turned out even more austere than it appears in de la Mothe's drawings."

In 1761 Kokorinov was appointed director of the Academy (subordinate to its President), but it was not until 1765 when he became its professor. He taught elementary architectural theory and history of architecture, while de la Mothe taught advanced architectural subjects.

While the architects finalized their proposal, Russia was shaken by a brief reign (5 January 1762 – 9 July 1762) and murder of emperor Peter III, succeeded by Catherine II. The new empress sent Shuvalov to a de facto exile in his country estate and installed Ivan Betskoy as the new President of the Academy. On 18 March 1764 she authorized financing for construction in earnest and set up construction board, headed by Kokorinov. De la Mothe, who always shied away from practical construction, was not actively involved on site; for the first time in Russian history, architectural profession was split into architectural design and construction management.

During Russian-Turkish war of 1768–1774 financing of the project virtually stopped, while Betskoy initiated a criminal case against alleged fraud on the site. Kokorinov, blamed with cost overruns, died in 1772; unofficial opinion held it that he committed suicide. De la Mothe left Russia in 1775, the building was completed by Yury Felten in 1788.

== Sources ==
- Lisovsky, Vladimir G. [in Russian] (2006). Леонтий Бенуа и петербургская школа художников-архитекторов (in Russian). Saint Petersburg: Kolo. ISBN 5-901841-44-1.
- Shvidkovsky, Dmitry S. (2007). Russian architecture and the West. Yale University Press. ISBN 978-0300109122.
- Shuisky, Valery K. [in Russian] (2008). Золотой век барокко и классицизма в Санкт-Петербурге (in Russian). Centrpoligraph. ISBN 978-5-9524-3777-7. OCLC 37943875.
- Krasheninnikov, Arkady F. [in Russian] (2008). Архитектор Александр Кокоринов [Architect Alexander Kokorinov] (in Russian). Moscow: Progress-Traditsiya. ISBN 978-5-89826-205-1. OCLC 259743758.
