= Yekaterina Naryshkina =

Russian lady of state and cavalier lady

Ekaterina Ivanovna Naryshkina
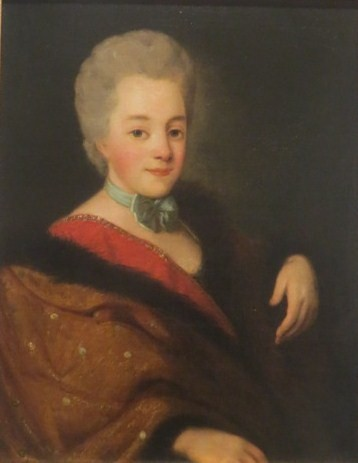
- Portrait, 1750s
- Born: 11 May 1729
- Died: 22 July 1771 (aged 42); St. Petersburg
- Buried: Annunciation Church of the Alexander Nevsky Lavra
- Spouse: Kirill Razumovsky
- Issue: Natalya Kirillovna; Alexei Kirillovich; Elizaveta Kirillovna; Pyotr Kirillovich; Andrei Kirillovich; Daria Kirillovna; Anna Kirillovna; Praskovya Kirillovna; Lev Kirillovich; Grigory Kirillovich; Ivan Kirillovich
- Father: Ivan Lvovich Naryshkin
- Mother: Daria Kirillovna Naryshkina

Countess Ekaterina Ivanovna Razumovskaya (Russian: Екатерина Ивановна Разумовская; née Naryshkina (Нарышкина); May 22 [O.S. May 11] 1729 – August 2 [O.S. July 22] 1771) was a Russian lady of state, cavalier lady, and the wife of the last hetman of the Zaporizhian Host, Kirill Razumovsky.

== Biography ==
Born into the Naryshkin family, Ekaterina was the daughter of naval captain Ivan Lvovich Naryshkin (1700–1734) and Daria Kirillovna Naryshkina (1709–1730). Her father was the nephew of the Russian Tsarina, Natalya Naryshkina, making Ekaterina the second cousin of Elizabeth I. Her mother died when Ekaterina was only a year old. Four years later her father also died, orphaning her. She was raised in the house of her uncle Alexander Lvovich until Elizabeth made her a maid of honour.

Once Elizabeth acceded to the throne, she wanted to marry Kirill Razumovsky, younger brother of her favourite Alexei Razumovsky, to a rich noble girl. Ekaterina seemed like an ideal choice in terms of wealth and pedigree. The wedding took place on 27 October 1746 in the presence of the Empress, aristocrats, and foreign ambassadors, with almost royal honours and celebrations. The following day, Ekaterina was appointed Lady of State and given a 'rich portrait'. Her dowry amounted to almost the half of the vast fortune of the Naryshkins: up to 44,000 peasants, with the large Penza estates near Moscow Petrovsky-Razumovsky, Troitsky-Lykov, Polivanov, Cherkizovo, and a whole quarter in Moscow, Romanov Dvor. As well as 50 chests and caskets with jewelry, furs, silver, linens, brocade, books, engravings, money, and more.

When Catherine the Great came to the throne, she honoured the Razumovskys with her visit, on 25 July 1762, she bestowed Ekaterina with the Order of St. Catherine. However, relations between the couple and the Empress soured. Catherine II was dissatisfied with Razumovsky's hetmanship, and began to distrust not only him, but his wife as well.

In the last years of Ekaterina's life, the marriage was no longer harmonious, her husband having numerous affairs, and often disagreeing on the best way to raise their numerous children, who Ekaterina is said to have spoiled.

Ekaterina Ivanovna Razumovskaya died in Saint Petersburg in 1771. She was buried in the Annunciation Church of the Alexander Nevsky Lavra, beside her brother-in-law, Alexei Razumovsky. According to family tradition, chamberlains and court ladies were on duty at her coffin as a representative of the late Empress.

== Issue ==
Ekaterina Ivanovna and Kirill Grigorievich Razumovsky had six sons and five daughters:

- Natalya Kirillovna (1747–1837), maid of honour as of 1772, married Nikolai Alexandrovich Zagryazhsky (1743–1821).
- Alexei Kirillovich (1748–1822), chamberlain, privy councilor, senator, and minister of public education.
- Elizaveta Kirillovna (1749–1813), maid of honour. She had an affair with Adjutant General Pyotr Fedorovich Apraksin (1728–1811) and fell pregnant. They were betrothed against the will of her father, who requested that Catherine II, imprison him in the Peter and Paul Fortress for six months. He was released on the condition that he never communicate with Elizaveta or her family again. Upon his release the couple secretly married, for which he was a secret prisoner in a monastery in the Ural Mountains for more than two years. After his release, the couple lived together in Kazan as they were forbidden from entering the capitals. They had six children; their son Alexander became an agent of the Russian government in Austria.
- Pytor Kirillovich (1751–1823), chief chamberlain. Married maid of honour Sofia Stepanovna Chertoryzhskaya, née Ushakova (1746–1806) against the will of his father.
- Andrei Kirillovich (1752–1836), His Serene Highness, Prince, and diplomat.
- Daria Kirillovna (1753–1762), died aged nine. Buried in her mother's family vault in the Bogolyubsky church of the Moscow Vysoko-Petrovsky Monastery.
- Anna Kirillovna (1754–1826), maid of honor, distinguished by her beautiful appearance, was married to Prince V. S. Vasilchikov.
- Praskovya Kirillovna (1755–1808), maid of honor, was married against her will to Field Marshal Ivan V. Gudovich (1741–1820).
- Lev Kirillovich (1757–1818), major general, was married to Maria Grigorievna Golitsyna (1772–1865).
- Grigori Kirillovich (1759–1837), geologist, botanist, writer, lived almost constantly abroad.
- Ivan Kirillovich (1761–1802), major general, commander of the Little Russian Grenadier Regiment.
