= Razumovsky (disambiguation) =

Razumovsky is a Ukrainian-Russian noble family.

It may refer to:

- Count Andrey Razumovsky (1752-1836), Russian diplomat and patron of the arts
- Vasili Razumovsky (1857-1935), Russian surgeon
- Grigory Razumovsky (born 1936), a Soviet politician in the Brezhnev-Gorbachev Eras.

== See also ==
- Palais Rasumofsky, a neoclassical palace in Vienna, commissioned as an embassy building by Andrey Razumovsky
- Razumovsky Quartets (or Rasumovsky Quartets), a set of three string quartets (Op. 59) composed by Ludwig van Beethoven
