= Imperial Academy of Arts =

Former art school in Saint Petersburg, Russia

- Императорская Академия художеств
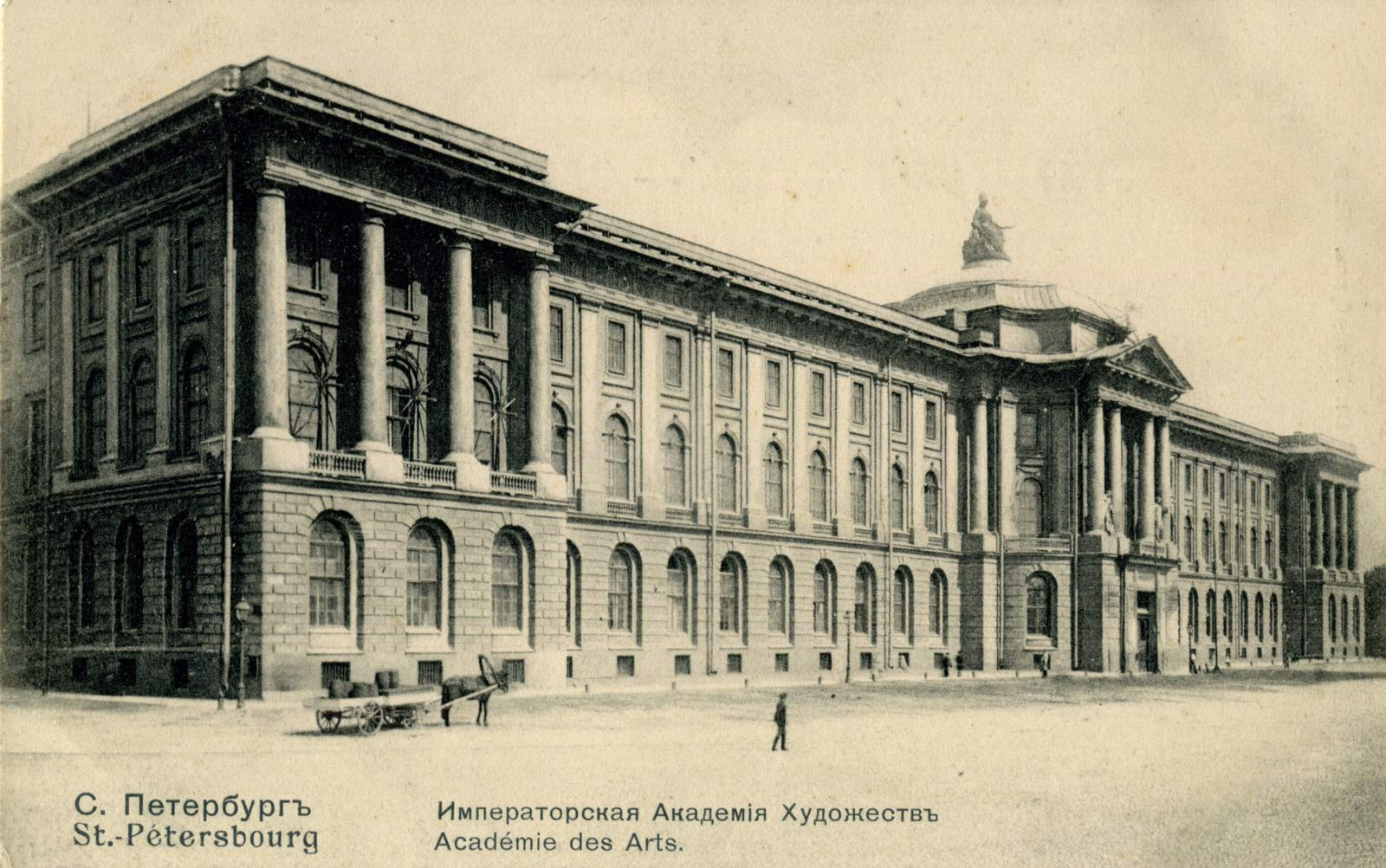
- Imperial Academy of Arts (1912)
- Type: Imperial Academy of Arts of the Russian Empire
- Active: 1757–1917
- Founders: Ivan Shuvalov
- Location: Saint-Petersburg, Russian Empire; 59°56′15″N 30°17′25″E

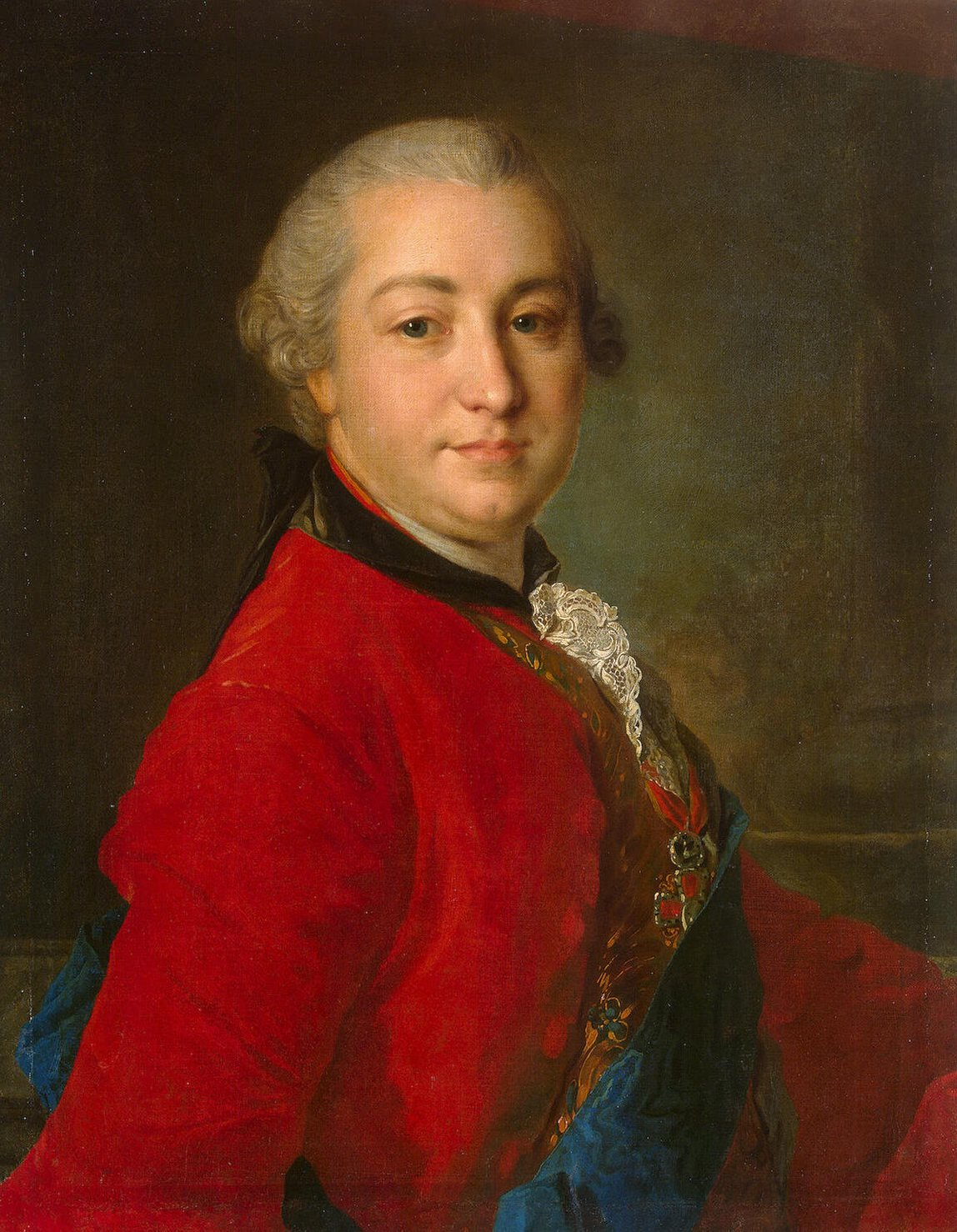
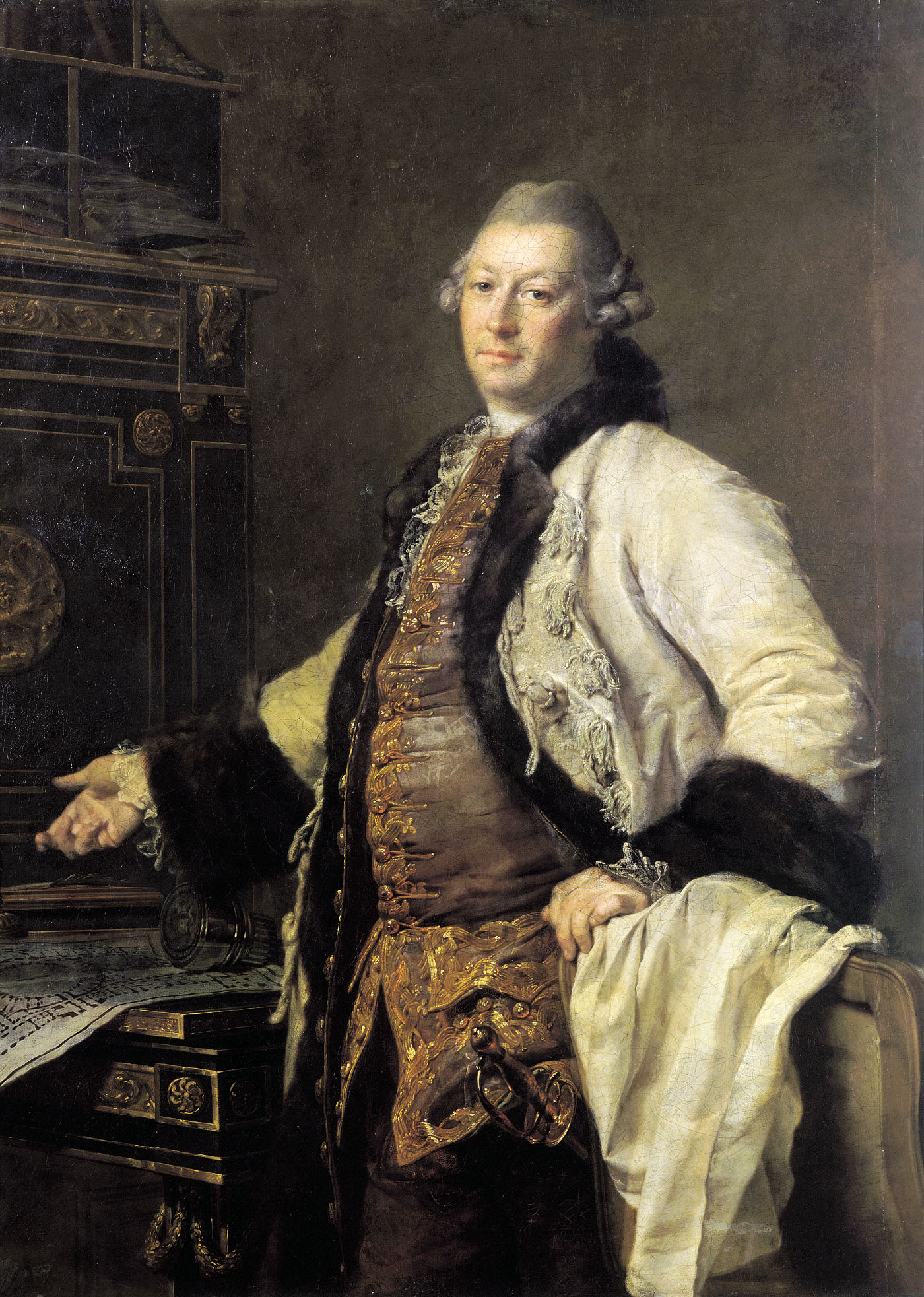
The founders of the academy, Ivan Shuvalov and Alexander Kokorinov

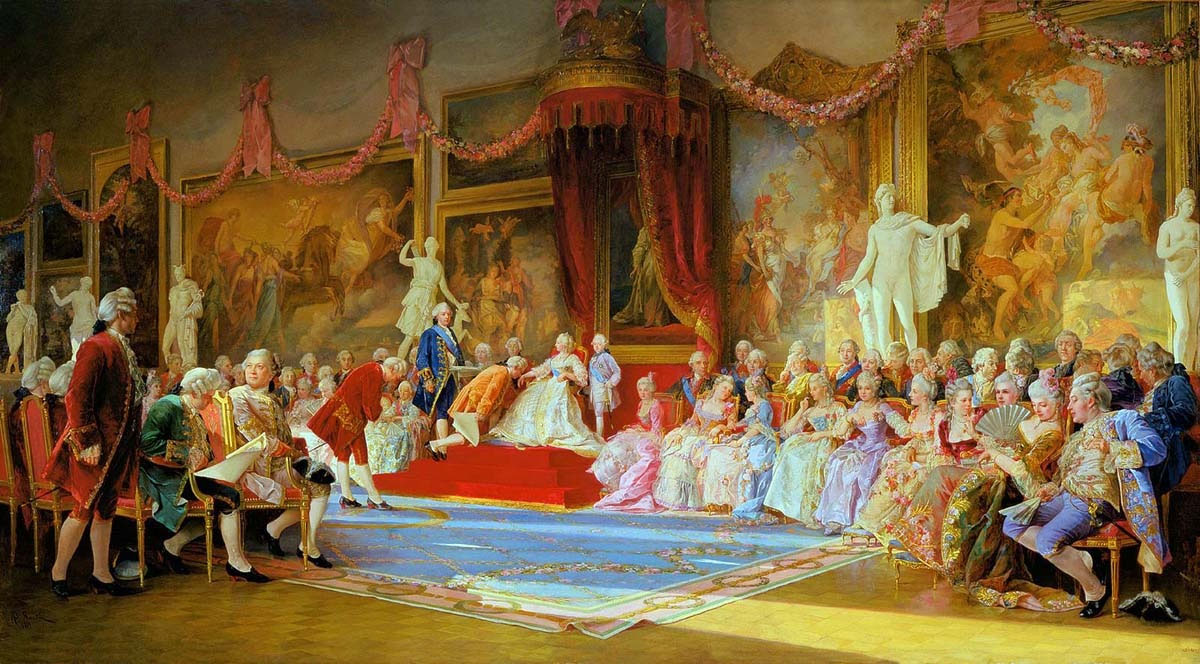
The Inauguration of the Academy of Arts, a painting by Valery Jacobi.

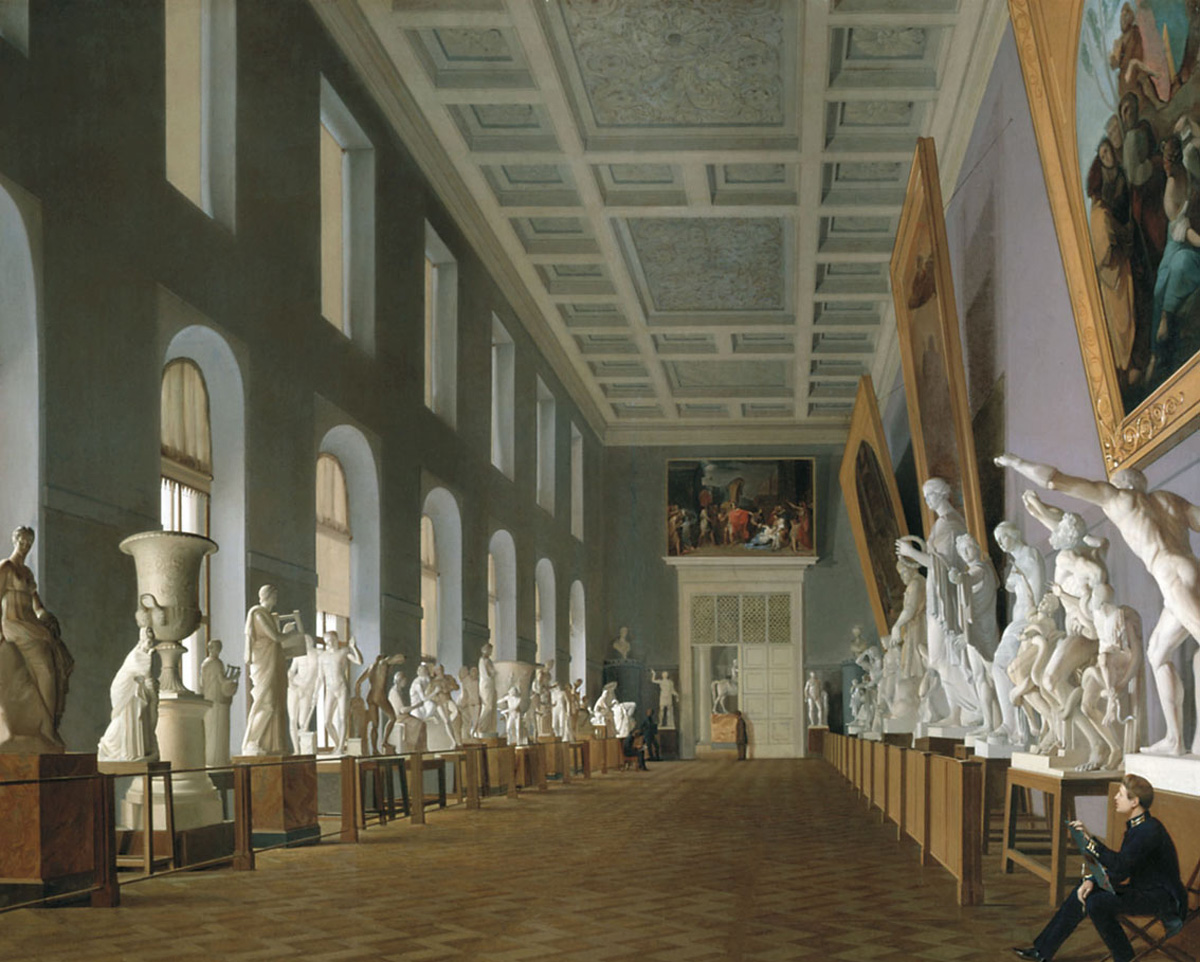
G. K. Mikhailov, Second Antique Gallery at the Academy of Arts (1836)

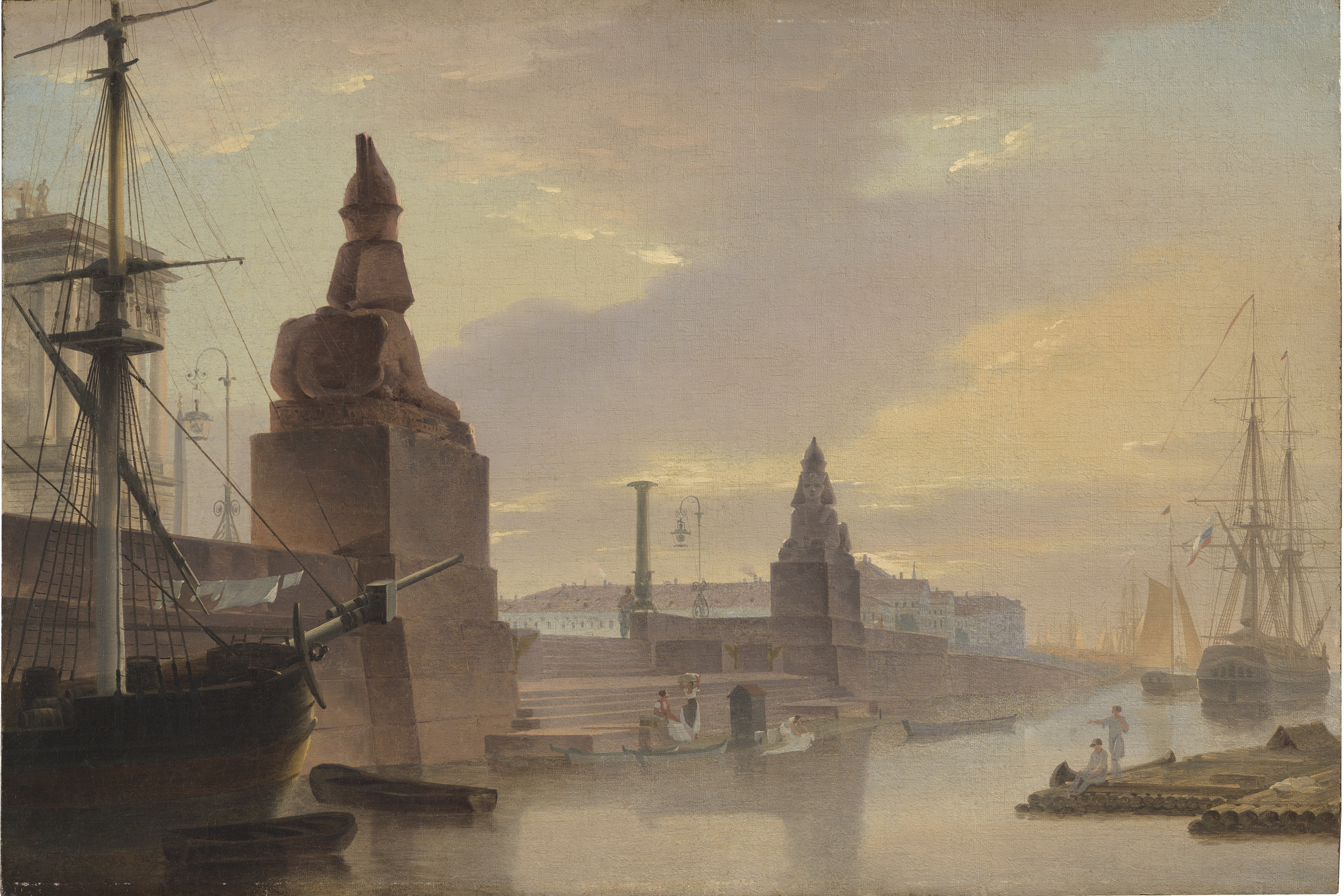
Maksim Vorobyov, Egyptian sphinxes lining Academy Quay (1835)

The Imperial Academy of Arts, informally known as the Saint Petersburg Academy of Arts, was an art academy in Saint Petersburg, founded in 1757 by Ivan Shuvalov, the founder of the Imperial Moscow University, under the name Academy of the Three Noblest Arts. Catherine the Great renamed it the Imperial Academy of Arts and commissioned a new building, completed 25 years later in 1789 by the Neva River. The academy promoted the neoclassical style and technique, and sent its promising students to European capitals for further study. Training at the academy was virtually required for artists to make successful careers.

Formally abolished in 1918 after the Russian Revolution, the academy was renamed several times. It established free tuition; students from across the country competed fiercely for its few places annually. In 1947 the national institution was moved to Moscow, and much of its art collection was moved to the Hermitage. The building in Leningrad was devoted to the Ilya Repin Leningrad Institute for Painting, Sculpture and Architecture, named in honor of Ilya Repin, one of the foremost realist artists in Russia. Since 1991, it has been called the St. Petersburg Institute for Painting, Sculpture and Architecture.

== In Imperial Russia ==
The academy was initially located in the Shuvalov Mansion on Sadovaya Street. In 1764, Catherine the Great renamed it the Imperial Academy of Arts and commissioned its first rector, Alexander Kokorinov, to design a new building. It took 25 years to complete the Neoclassical edifice, which opened in 1789. Konstantin Thon was responsible for the sumptuous decoration of the interiors. He also designed a quayside in front of the building, with stairs down to the Neva River, and adorned it with two 3000-year-old sphinxes, which were transported from Egypt.

Ivan Betskoy reorganized the academy into a de facto government department; it supervised matters concerning art throughout the country, distributing orders and awarding ranks to artists. The academy vigorously promoted the principles of Neoclassicism by sending the most notable Russian painters abroad, in order to learn the ancient and Renaissance styles of Italy and France. It also had its own sizable collection of choice artworks intended for study and copying.

In the mid-19th century, the Academism of training staff, much influenced by the doctrines of Dominique Ingres, was challenged by a younger generation of Russian artists who asserted their freedom to paint in a Realistic style. The adherents of this movement became known as peredvizhniki (Itinerants, related to their desire to bring art to the people). Led by Ivan Kramskoi, they publicly broke with the Academy and organized their own exhibitions, which traveled from town to town across Russia. Ilya Repin, Mikhail Vrubel and some other painters still regarded the academy's training as indispensable for the development of basic professional and technical skills.

=== Higher Art School of the Academy of Arts ===
In 1893, Imperial Academy of Arts was divided into the Academy of Arts itself, which was responsible for all the artistic work in the Russian Empire, and the Higher Art School of the Academy of Arts, which dealt only with academic affairs. The initiator of the reform was the vice-president of the Academy, Count Ivan Ivanovich Tolstoy.

The Charter, approved at the end of 1893, divided the former Academy into two institutions:

- Academy itself (Academic «Assembly» consisting of the President, Vice-president, Conference secretary, 60 Full members and 20 Honorary members of the Academy), a state institution «for the maintenance, development and dissemination of art in Russia».
- Educational institution — Higher Art School at the Academy, managed by the «Council of Professors» with the Rector at the head.

Both institutions were located in St. Petersburg in the historic building of the Academy of Arts.

Instead of the old professors, peredvizhniki artists were invited to teaching positions at the Higher Art School. The program of study at the Higher School has changed significantly: the institute of professors and managers was established and free topics for competitive tests were established. New professors came to the academy, among whom Ilya Repin stood out. Famous artists were invited by the heads of personal workshops: Vladimir Makovsky, Ivan Shishkin, Arkhip Kuindzhi, Aleksey Kivshenko. Later came: Alexander Kiselyov, Dmitry Kardovsky, Nikolay Dubovskoy, Nikolay Samokish, Vasily Mate.

=== Big Gold Medal of the Imperial Academy of Arts ===
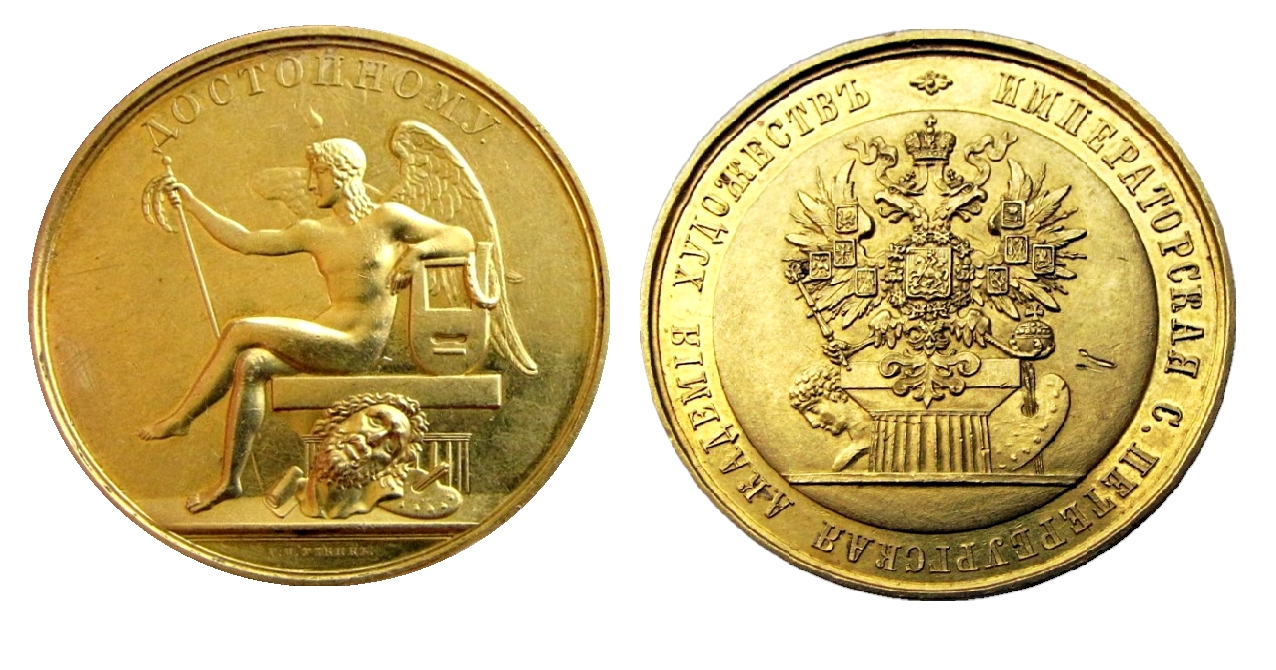
Big Gold Medal of the Imperial Academy of Arts

The Big Gold Medal, which granted the right to a foreign pensioner (from three to six years), was awarded in a competition to which the most talented graduates of the Academy were allowed to complete their studies, awarded to the beginning of the competition with the small gold medal of the Academy «For Success in Drawing». Graduates who received a large gold medal remained at the Academy of Arts for another year; they were provided with a separate workshop, materials for work and a generous cash allowance. Those admitted to the competition were obliged to execute the «program», to draw a picture according to the program (creative task), one for all, approved by the Council of the Academy of Arts. The task, most often on a historical theme, was made in such a way that the participant showed all the professional skills and knowledge he mastered during his studies.

- Category:Awarded with a large gold medal of the Academy of Arts

=== Personalities of the Imperial Academy of Arts ===
- Category:Imperial Academy of Arts alumni
- Members of the Imperial Academy of Arts
- Full Members of the Imperial Academy of Arts

== In the Soviet Union ==
After the Russian Revolution of 1917, the Imperial Academy passed through a series of transformations. It was formally abolished in 1918 and the Petrograd Free Art Educational Studios (Pegoskhuma) created in its place; this was renamed the Petrograd Svomas (Free Art Studios) in 1919, the Petrograd State Art-Educational Studios of the Reconstructed Academy of Arts in 1921, Vkhutein in 1928, the Institute of Proletarian Fine Arts in 1930, the Russian Academy of Arts in 1933, and the Academy of Arts of the USSR in 1947. After the Academy's move to Moscow that year, the building in what was then called Leningrad was renamed Ilya Repin Leningrad Institute for Painting, Sculpture and Architecture.

The national academy has stayed in Moscow. In 1991 it was renamed the Russian Academy of Arts. The old academy's art collection, which included major works by Poussin, David and Ingres, was removed to the Hermitage Museum across the river.

During the Soviet era, academies were free of tuition fees as they were financed by the government, but admission was intensely competitive. Many would-be students would apply to the Academy for as many as six or seven years in a row without success. With just twenty places available and thousands of applicants, the competition was brutal.

=== Graduates of Ilya Repin Leningrad Institute (1930–1950) ===
Well-known graduates of Ilya Repin Leningrad Institute for Painting, Sculpture and Architecture in 1930–1950s include:

- Category:Repin Institute of Arts alumni

== Current situation ==
The Russian Academy of Arts has been headquartered in Moscow since 1947. Its current president is Zurab Tsereteli and its vice-president is Tair Salakhov.

The historic building on the Neva River in St. Petersburg is used for the Saint Petersburg Repin Academy of Arts, in honor of one of its well-known alumni. It is also called the St. Petersburg State Academic Institute of Fine Arts, Sculpture and Architecture (as on its website).

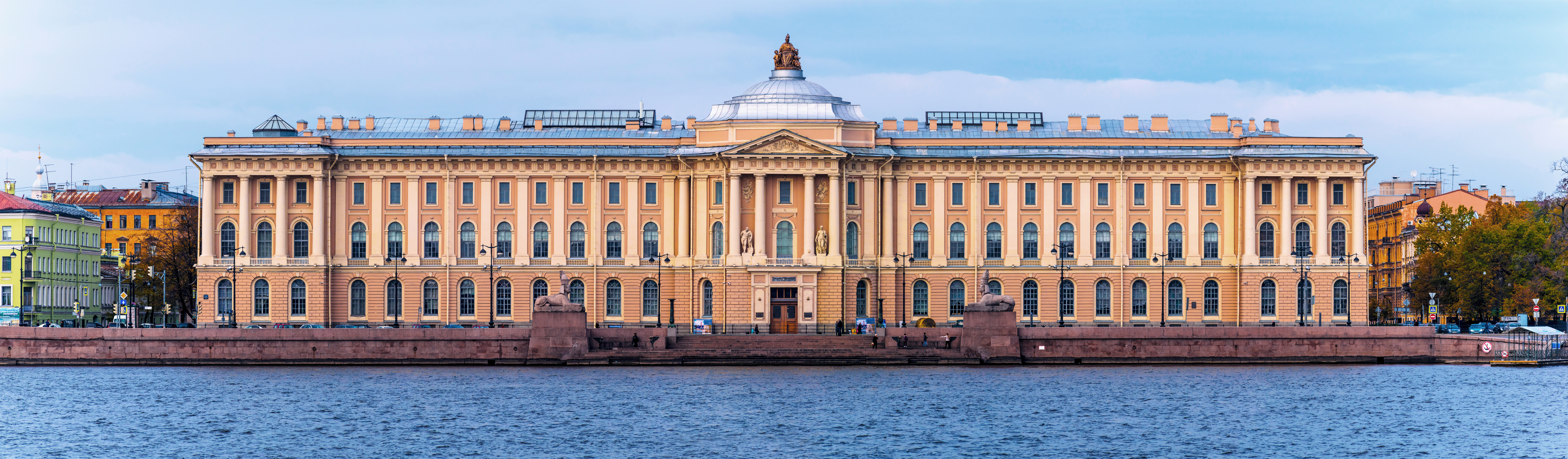
Panorama of the building

== See also ==
- Russian Academy of Arts
- Academic art
- Alexander Kokorinov
- Peredvizhniki
- List of Russian artists
- List of 20th-century Russian painters
- List of painters of Saint Petersburg Union of Artists

== Bibliography ==
- Howard, Jeremy (2006). East European Art, 1650–1950. Oxford History of Arts. Oxford, New York: Oxford University Press. ISBN 0-19-284224-2. OCLC 1148939700 – via the Internet Archive.
- Sergei V. Ivanov. Unknown Socialist Realism. The Leningrad School. – Saint Petersburg: NP-Print Edition, 2007. – p. 447. ISBN 5-901724-21-6, ISBN 978-5-901724-21-7.
- С. Н. Кондаков (1915). Юбилейный справочник Императорской Академии художеств. 1764–1914 (in Russian). Vol. 1. p. __.
- С. Н. Кондаков (1915). Юбилейный справочник Императорской Академии художеств. 1764–1914 (in Russian). Vol. 2. p. __.
- "Санкт-Петербургская академия художеств | Институт имени И. Е. Репина". artsacademy.ru.
