= Grigory Razumovsky =

Russian nobleman, political philosopher, botanist, zoologist and geologist

- Григорий Разумовский; Григорій Розумовський
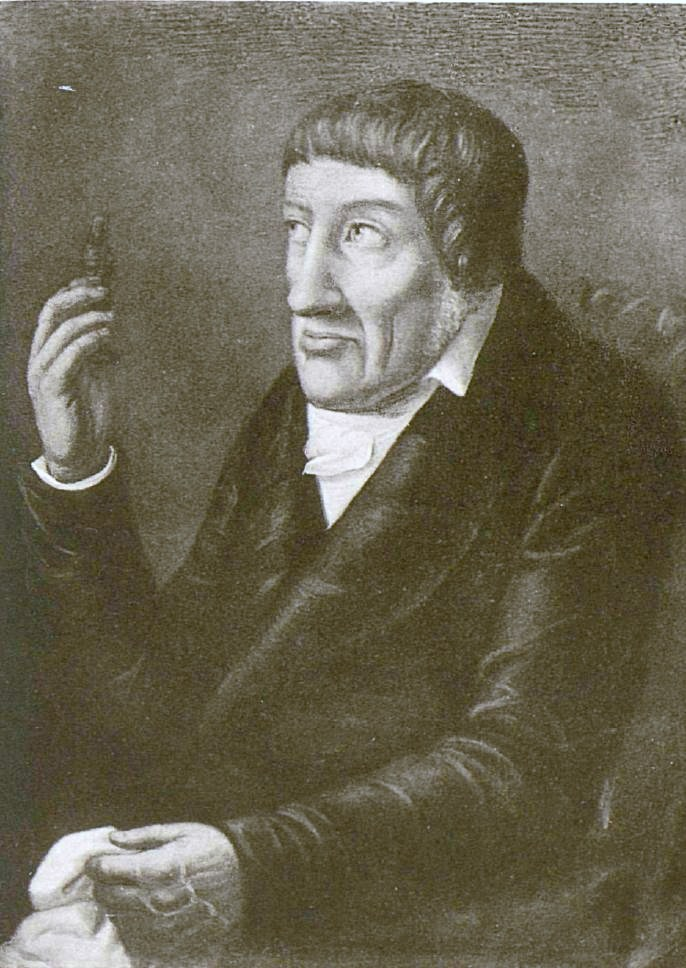
- Born: 10 November 1759; Saint-Petersburg, Russian Empire
- Died: 3 June 1837 (aged 77); Böhmisch Rudoletz, Austrian Empire
- Education: University of Leiden
- Title: Graf
- Spouse(s): Henriette von Malsen-Tilborch; Therese Elisabeth Schenk von Kastel
- Parents: Kirill Razumovsky (father); Yekaterina Naryshkina (mother)

Count Grigory Kirillovich Razumovsky (Russian: Григорий Кириллович Разумовский; Ukrainian: Григорій Кирилович Розумовський; 10 November 1759 – 3 June 1837) was a nobleman, botanist, zoologist, geologist and mineralogist from the Russian Empire. He was a member of the Razumovsky noble family. Razumovsky is known from his writings in the West as Gregor or Grégoire.

== Career ==
Razumovsky was born on 10 November 1759 in Saint-Petersburg, Russia into a family of Ukrainian Cossack origin. He was the fifth son of Kirill Razumovsky, the last hetman of the Zaporozhian Host, and Yekaterina Naryshkina. Razumovsky studied mineralogy and geology at the University of Leiden with Jean-Nicolas-Sébastien Allamand. In 1782, he went to Lausanne, Switzerland to continue his education, and was later a co-founder of the city's Society of Physical Sciences. He corresponded with Horace Bénédict de Saussure in Geneva and Jakob Samuel Wyttenbach in Bern. In 1788, Razumovsky was elected a foreign member of the Royal Swedish Academy of Sciences.

Razumovsky left Switzerland in 1793 and returned to the Russian Empire, where he continued his scientific studies. He emigrated to the Austrian Empire in the 1810s, following a conviction of bigamy in Russia, and was subsequently incorporated into the Bohemian nobility (Inkolat im Herrenstande) and accorded the title of count (Graf). Razumovsky was a member of the numerous scientific societies, including those of Basel, Lausanne, and Zurich. He died on 3 June 1837 in Böhmisch Rudoletz, Moravia (now Český Rudolec, Czech Republic), aged 77.

== Science ==
Razumovsky was one of the first geologist to take an interest in the Swiss Alps. As a natural scientist, he was the first to describe and classify Lissotrion helveticus. In the field of geology, Razumovsky has been described as a "non-actualistic catastrophist". He was also an advocate of Neptunism.

== Publications ==
- Observations Minéralogiques sur les environs de Vienne (1822).
- «Essai d’un système de transition de la nature dans le règne minéral. Lausanne»
- «Oeuvres de M. le comte Grégoire de Razoumowsky». Lausanne, chez Maures Cadet. 1784. 2 vol.
- "Histoire naturelle de Jorat et de ses environs et celle des trois lacs de Neufchatel, Morat et Brienne, précédée d’un essai sur le climat, les productions, le commerce, les animaux de la partie du pays de Vaud ou de la Suisse Romanne, qui entre dans le plan de cet ouvrage, par le comte de Razoumowsky (Lausanne, chez Jean Maures. 1789. 2 vol).
- Von der Ukrainischen Stutereien. Lernbegriff von den Krankheiten der Pferde und deren Heilung von I. C. Zeihers. Berlin. 8

== Memberships ==
- Royal Swedish Academy of Sciences
- Royal Academy of Turin
- Bavarian Academy of Sciences and Humanities
- Russian Mineralogical Society
- Jena Mineralogical Society
- Imperial Moscow Society of Naturalists
- Zurich Physical Society
- Basel Medical Physics Society
- Turin Agronomic Society
