= Karl Blank =

Russian architect (1728–1793)

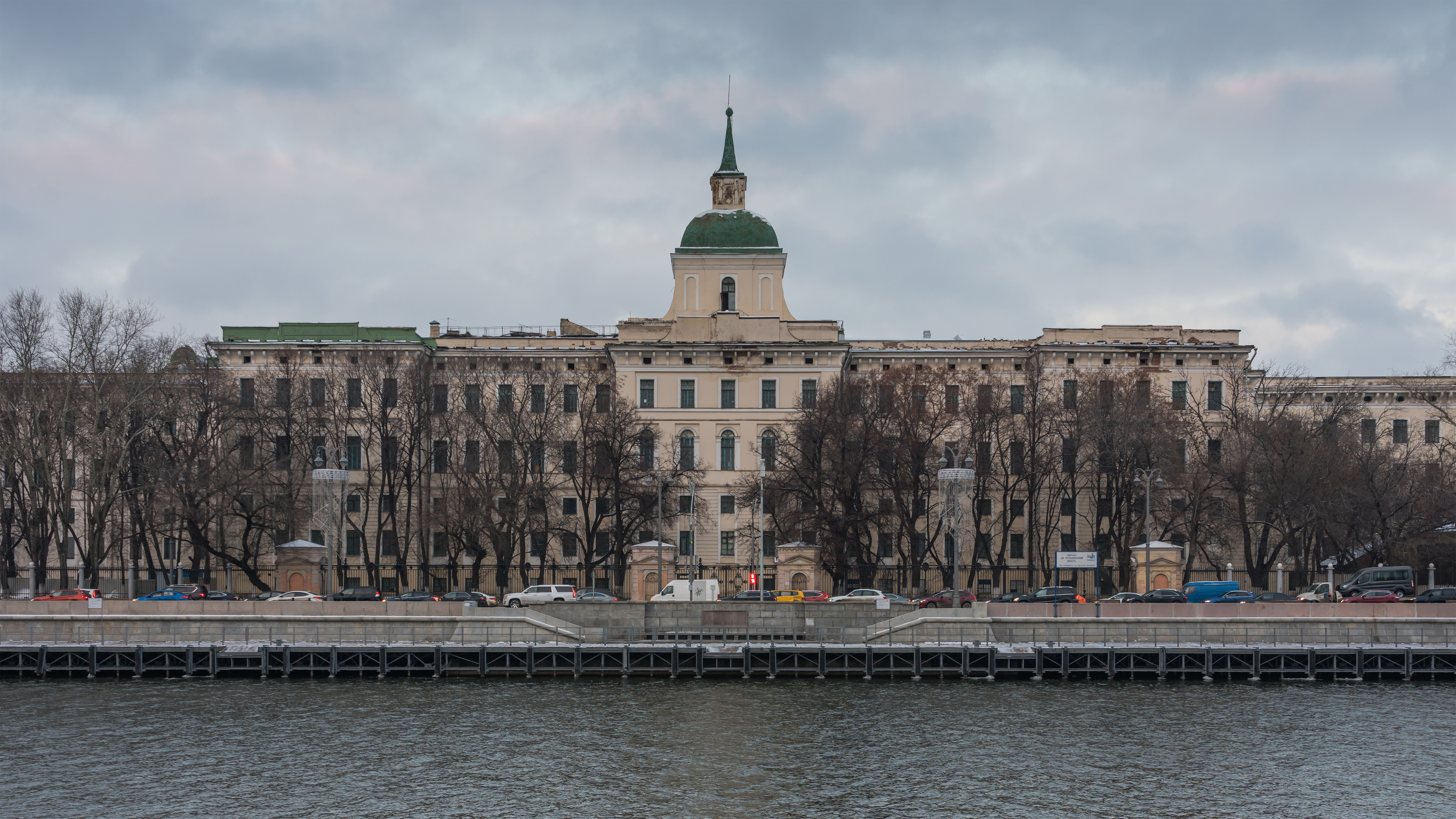
- Moscow Orphanage
- Born: 1728; Saint Petersburg, Russia
- Died: 1793 (aged 64–65); Moscow, Russia
- Occupation: Architect
- Buildings: Baroque churches in Moscow
- Projects: Moscow Orphanage

Karl Ivanovich Blank (Russian: Карл Иванович Бланк; 1728–1793) was a Russian architect, notable as one of the last practitioners of Baroque architecture and the first Moscow architect to build early neoclassical buildings. His surviving, undisputed legacy consists of three baroque churches and Moscow Orphanage. The Ukrainian palace of Kachanivka is also attributed to him.

== Biography ==
Blank's ancestors were French Huguenot refugees who settled in Germany. His grandfather, Jacob, a skilled blacksmith, migrated to Russia during the reign of Peter I. His father, who already had a russified name, Ivan Yakovlevich Blank, began his career as an interpreter for the German architects in Saint Petersburg. Eventually, he became an assistant to Russian architect, Pyotr Yeropkin, who was closely associated with then-powerful courtier Artemy Volynsky. In June 1740, Volynsky and Yeropkin were executed in the form of beheading for the alleged conspiracy against Anna of Russia. Ivan Blank was sentenced to lifelong exile in Siberia with all his family. Karl's mother died during the long way to Tobolsk. In Tobolsk, Ivan and Karl met a talented local boy, Alexander Kokorinov. In 1741, when Elizabeth of Russia came to power and pardoned all involved in Volynsky trial, Blanks were allowed to return home; they took Kokorinov with them and left for Moscow. However, Ivan Blank died soon after his return.

Karl Blank and Alexander Kokorinov joined state construction crews led by Ivan Korobov and Pyotr Obukhov. By 1749, Karl passed junior architects' exams to the panel presided by Bartolomeo Rastrelli and was appointed as an assistant to Alexey Yevlashev. Rastrelli supervised Blank's early career and instructed him to plan restoration and expansion drafts for the main cathedral of the New Jerusalem Monastery. This early project never materialized, but a few years later, from 1756 to 1759 Blank himself took the lead in restoring New Jerusalem.

His own early designs, like the completed Annenhof palace in Lefortovo, did not survive (they were burnt down in the Fire of 1812 or otherwise perished before the invention of photography). Blank's career peaked in 1760s, during the reign of Catherine II. He successfully managed the architectural part of Catherine's coronation in Moscow; the new empress commissioned him to build church of St. Catherine in Zamoskvorechye. Despite subsequent fires and rebuilds, original dome of St. Catherine's still stands in Bolshaya Ordynka Street. Blank became a house architect for Ivan Vorontsov, and built two extant churches on Vorontsov's lands (one in Moscow, one in his country estate). The fourth extant church stands near Yauza Gates; two other Moscow churches were demolished in 1930s. Some researchers also give him full credit for the Trinity church in present-day Zheleznodorozhny.

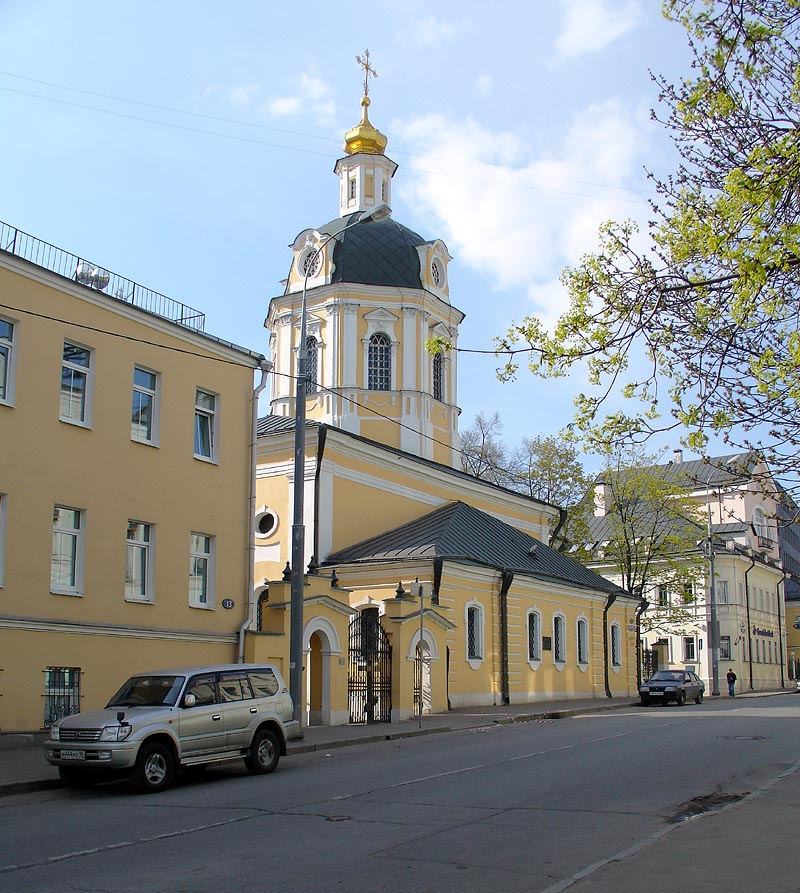
St. Nicholas church, Rozhdestvenka Street

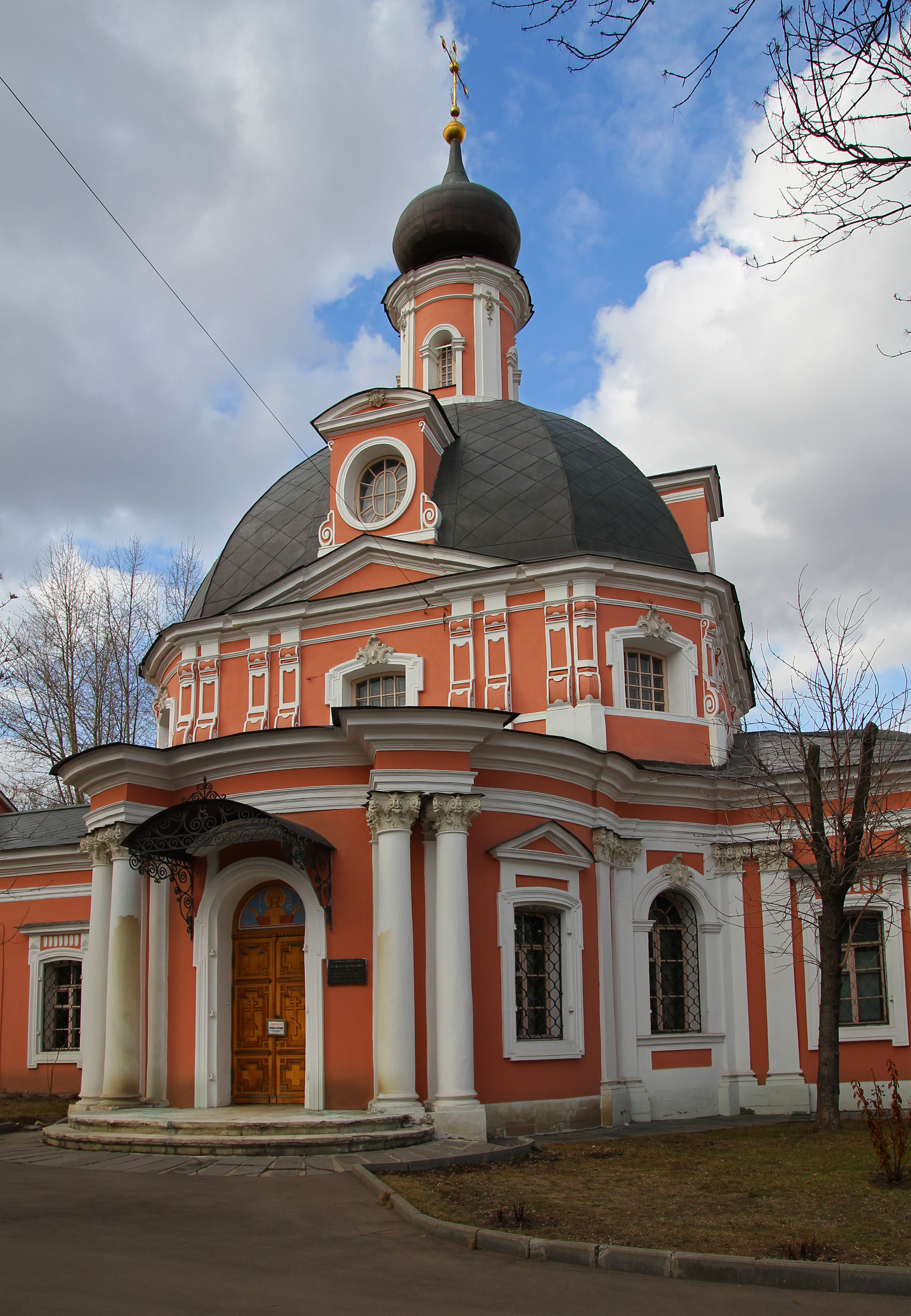
St. Catherine church, Zamoskvorechye

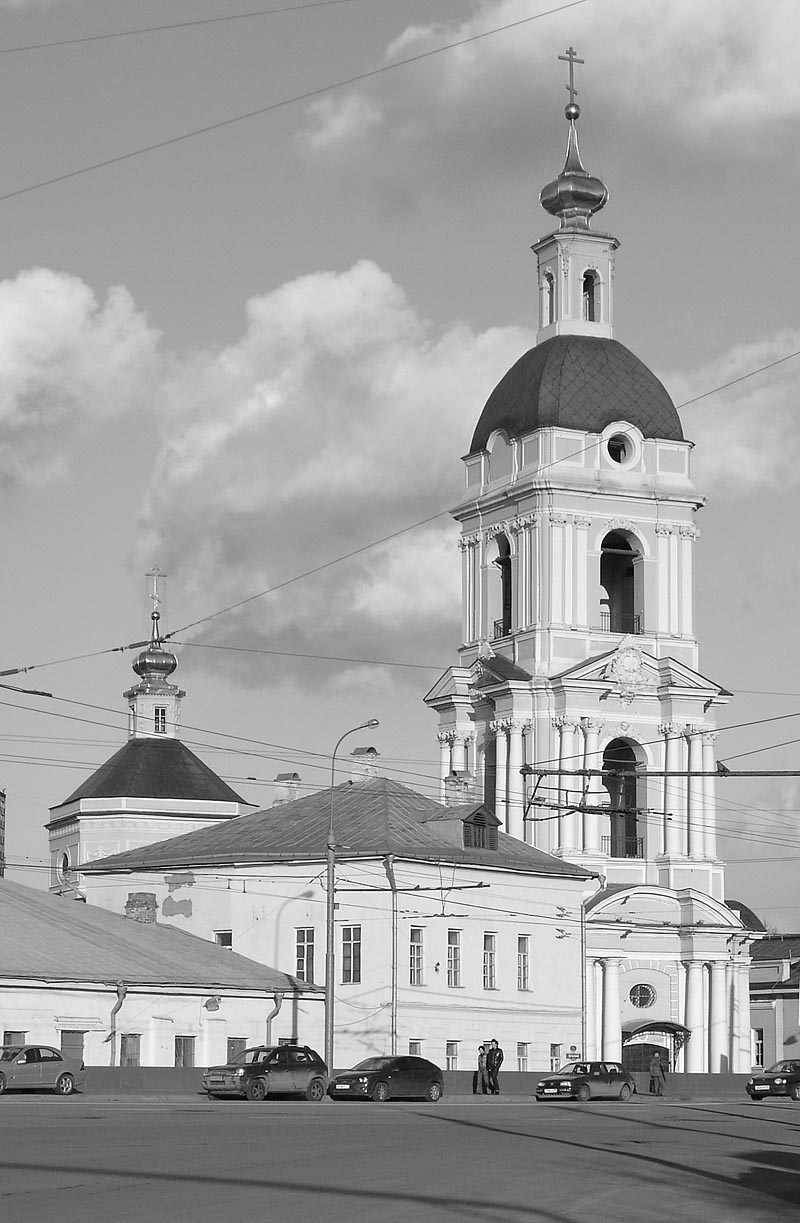
Trinity church by Yauza River

From 1764 to 1781, Blank built his largest project, Moscow Orphanage, designed to house 8,000 resident children and staff. Only two thirds of his original plan were completed; the eastern wing was added only in 1940s. The Orphanage is believed to be Moscow's first neoclassical building, and is surely the earliest extant example of the style, retaining most of original exterior. The Orphanage earned him a reputation of a manager who could handle the largest projects of his time; at the same time its austere looks scared off the customers. Soon after acquiring the Kremlin Senate commission in 1775, Blank was stripped from the job (the Senate was redesigned and completed by Matvey Kazakov); his third large work for the state, Catherine's Institute in Meshchansky District of Moscow, burnt down in 1812.

In the 1780s, Blank quit independent construction management and became a consultant in landscaping and interior design; his advice was sought after by the wealthiest nobles. Notably, he consulted count Pyotr Sheremetyev on Kuskovo a palace project, and personally designed the Hermitage and Dutch house pavilions.

Blank had five children; among his descendants are Nikolay Basargin, a convicted decembrist, and notable geographer Pyotr Semenov-Tyan-Shansky.
