= Český Rudolec =

- Municipality
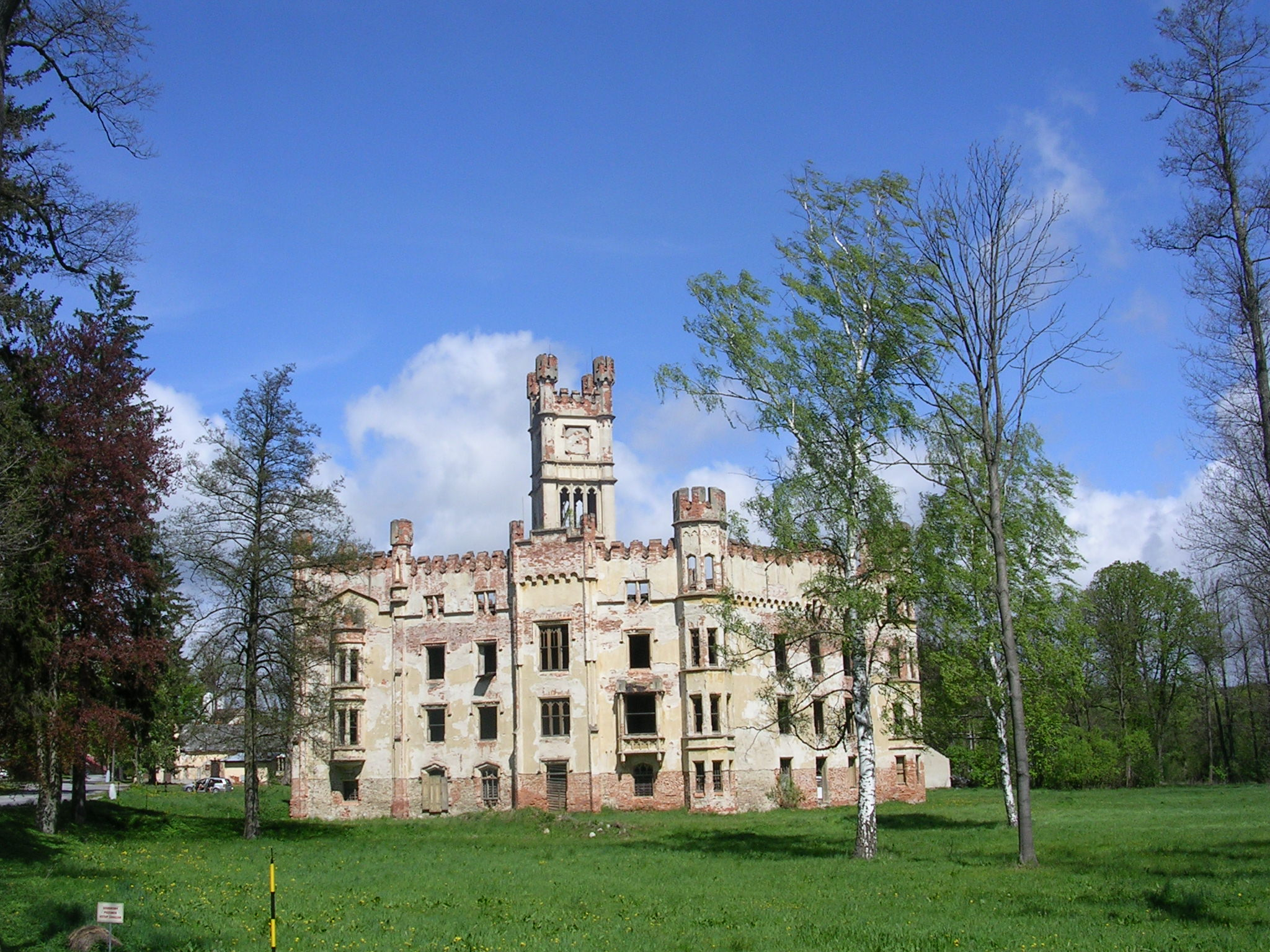
- Český Rudolec Castle

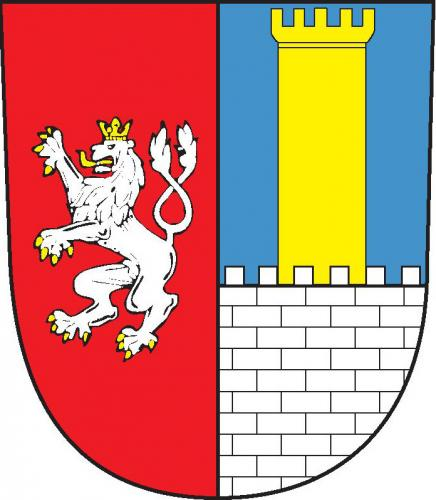
- Coat of arms

- Location in the Czech Republic
- Coordinates: 49°4′6″N 15°19′28″E
- Country: Czech Republic
- Region: South Bohemian
- District: Jindřichův Hradec
- First mentioned: 1343

Area
  - Total: 49.28 km^{2} (19.03 sq mi)
- Elevation: 511 m (1,677 ft)

Population (2026-01-01)
  - Total: 862
  - Density: 17.5/km^{2} (45.3/sq mi)
- Time zone: UTC+1 (CET)
  - Summer (DST): UTC+2 (CEST)
- Postal codes: 378 53, 378 81, 378 83, 380 01
- Website: www.ceskyrudolec.cz

Český Rudolec (German: Böhmisch Rudoletz) is a municipality and village in Jindřichův Hradec District in the South Bohemian Region of the Czech Republic. It has about 900 inhabitants.

Český Rudolec lies approximately 26 kilometres (16 mi) east of Jindřichův Hradec, 63 km (39 mi) east of České Budějovice, and 131 km (81 mi) south-east of Prague.

== Administrative division ==
Český Rudolec consists of ten municipal parts (in brackets population according to the 2021 census):

- Český Rudolec (556)
- Horní Radíkov (3)
- Lipnice (58)
- Markvarec (128)
- Matějovec (60)
- Nová Ves (10)
- Nový Svět (6)
- Radíkov (26)
- Rožnov (3)
- Stoječín (22)

== Demographics ==
Historical population
Year	Pop.	±%
1869	2,735	—
1880	2,661	−2.7%
1890	2,542	−4.5%
1900	2,463	−3.1%
1910	2,274	−7.7%
1921	2,217	−2.5%
1930	2,074	−6.5%
1950	1,248	−39.8%
1961	1,363	+9.2%
1970	1,150	−15.6%
1980	1,106	−3.8%
1991	1,018	−8.0%
2001	1,010	−0.8%
2011	916	−9.3%
2021	872	−4.8%
Source: Censuses
