= Kirill Razumovsky =

Russian statesman (1728–1803)

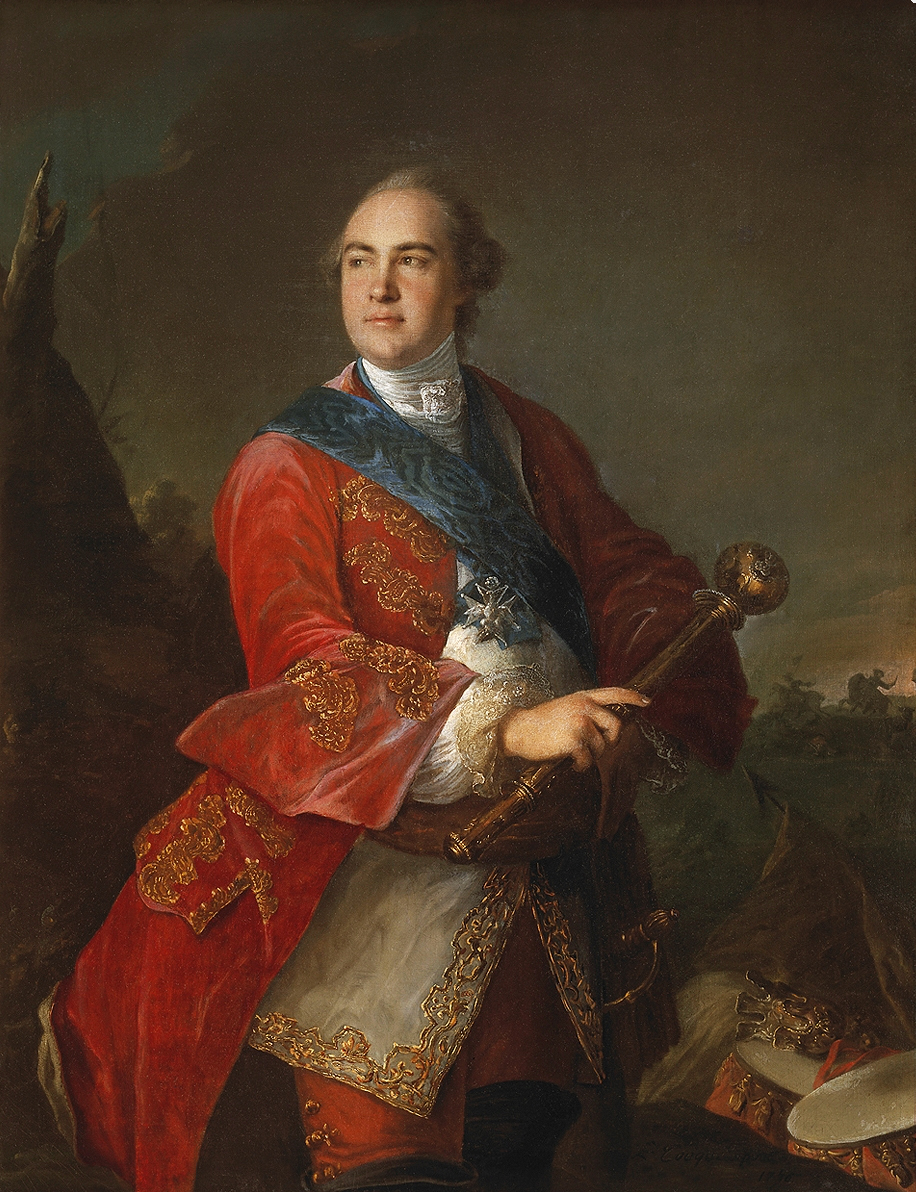
- Portrait by Louis Tocqué, 1758

Hetman of the Zaporizhian Host
- In office 1750–1764
- Monarchs: Elizabeth; Peter III; Catherine the Great
- Preceded by: Office re-established (previously Danylo Apostol)
- Succeeded by: Office abolished

President of the Russian Academy of Sciences
- In office 1746–1798
- Monarchs: Elizabeth; Peter III; Catherine the Great; Paul
- Preceded by: Office vacant
- Succeeded by: V. Orlov

Personal details
- Born: 18 March 1728 Lemeshi, Kiev Regiment, Cossack Hetmanate, Russian Empire (now Kozelets settlement hromada, Ukraine)
- Died: 9 January 1803 (aged 74) Baturin, Chernigov Governorate, Russian Empire (now in Ukraine)
- Resting place: Refectory Church of Resurrection of Christ, Baturyn
- Spouse: Yekaterina Naryshkina
- Children: 11, including Aleksey, Andrey, Grigory and Natalia

Military service
- Allegiance: Russia
- Rank: General field marshal (1764)

Count Kirill Grigoryevich Razumovsky or Razumovski (Note: Also known as Cyril Razumovski; Russian: Кирилл Григорьевич Разумовский; Ukrainian: Кирило Григорович Розумовський, romanized: Kyrylo Hryhorovych Rozumovskyi.) (29 March [O.S. 18 March] 1728 – 21 January [O.S. 9 January] 1803) was a Russian statesman of Ukrainian Cossack origin who served as the last hetman of the Zaporozhian Host on both sides of the Dnieper (from 1750 to 1764) and then as a General field marshal in the Imperial Russian Army. Razumovsky was also the president of the St. Petersburg Imperial Academy of Sciences from 1746 to 1798.

== Early life ==
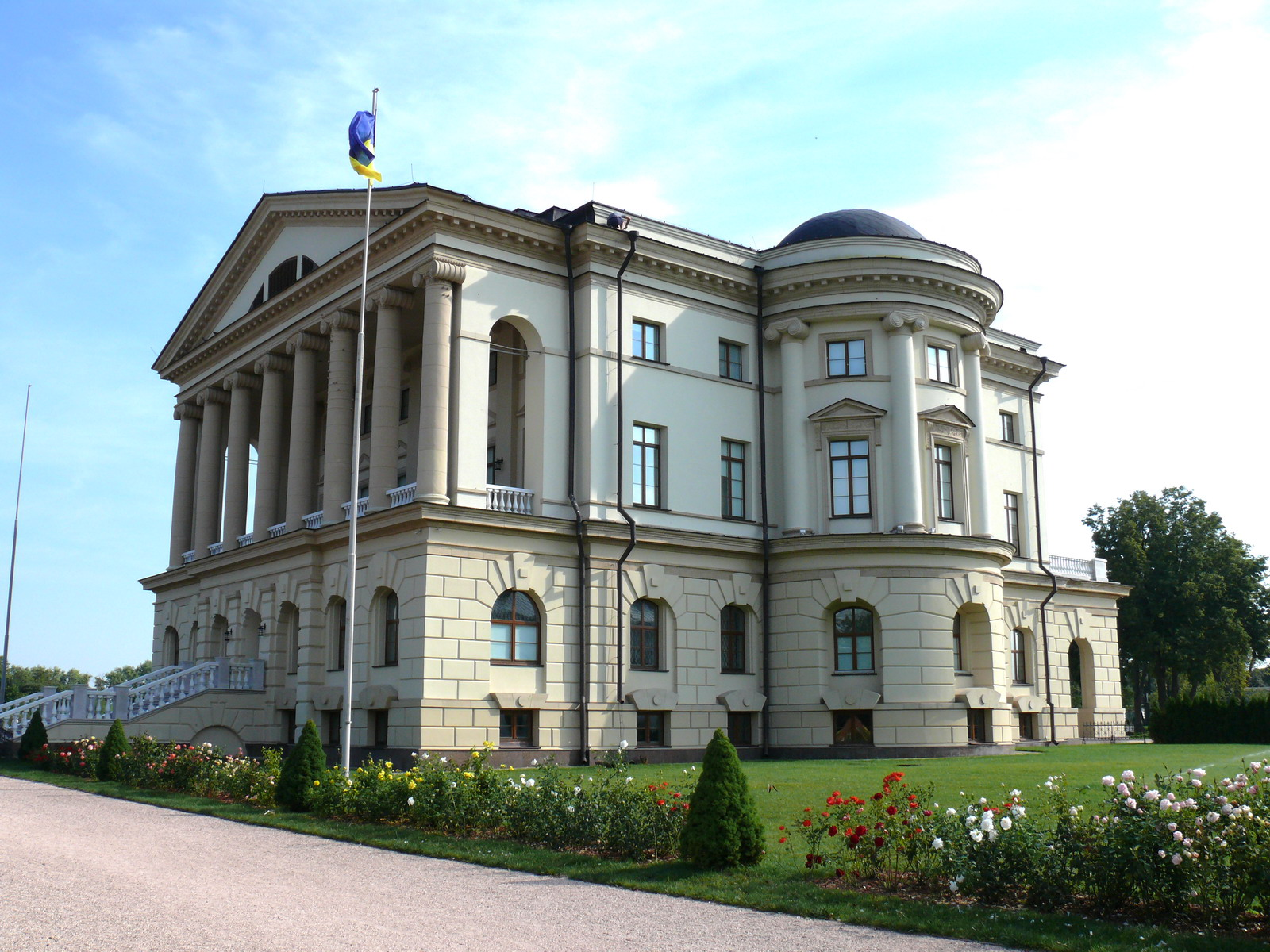
Restored Palace of Rozumovsky in Baturyn

Kirill Razumovsky was born in Lemeshi, Kiev Regiment, Cossack Hetmanate, Russian Empire, on 29 March 1728. He was a member of the Razumovsky family, at that time low-rank family of Cossack Grigory (Hryhoriy) Rozum. He was the younger brother of Alexei Razumovsky, partner of Elizabeth of Russia. Razumovsky was sent to study in Königsberg under Leonhard Euler at age 15. He graduated from the University of Göttingen.

In July 1744, Razumovsky was given the title of count. In 1746, Razumovsky was appointed as president of the Russian Academy of Sciences and served until 1765.

== Hetman ==
In 1750, Razumovsky was elected Hetman of the Zaporozhian Host. He became the largest landowner in Ukraine, with over 100,000 peasants within his lands. Grigory Teplov was his advisor during his time as Hetman. He sought to increase the independence and autonomy of the Hetmanate. The administration of the state was reformed with the state being divided into twenty counties, courts being established, and the Cossack starshyna being called more frequently. Non-Cossacks were allowed to become starshynas.

The finances of the Hetmanate were placed under the control of the imperial government in 1754, and its tariffs were abolished in 1755. The Hetman's power to appoint colonels and distribute hereditary titles were taken away and given to the Governing Senate in 1756. Control over Kiev was taken away from Razumovsky in 1761.

Razumovsky aided Catherine the Great assume the throne in 1762. In 1763, he requested that the position of Hetman be made hereditary and remain in his family. Catherine abolished the position on 10 November 1764, and Razumovsky was given the title of General Field Marshal. This was the last Cossack leadership position to be abolished.

== Later life ==
The construction of St Andrew's Church in Kiev was launched by Razumovsky. Razumovsky travelled across Europe and visited Germany, France, and Italy from 1765 to 1767. A place designed by Aleksey Yanovsky was constructed for Razumovsky in the 1780s.

Razumovsky died in Baturyn, Chernigov Governorate, on 15 January 1803.

== Works cited ==
=== Books ===
- Bowron, Edgar; Rishel, Joseph (2000). Art in Rome in the Eighteenth Century. Philadelphia Museum of Art. ISBN 0876331363.
- Durant, Will; Durant, Ariel (1967). Rousseau and Revolution: A History of Civilization in France, England, and Germany from 1756, and in the Remainder of Europe from 1715, to 1789. Simon & Schuster.
- Kondufor, Yuri, ed. (1986). A Short History of the Ukraine. Naukova Dumka.
- Plokhy, Serhii (2017). Lost Kingdom: A History of Russian Nationalism from Ivan the Great to Vladimir Putin. Penguin Books. ISBN 9780241255575.
- Turner, Jane, ed. (1996). The Dictionary of Art. Grove Press. ISBN 1884446000.

=== Journals ===
- Lang, D. (1951). "Count Todtleben's Expedition to Georgia 1769-1771 according to a French Eyewitness". Bulletin of the School of Oriental and African Studies. 13 (4). Cambridge University Press: 878–907. doi:10.2307/609022. JSTOR 609022.

=== Web ===
- "Rozumovsky, Kyrylo". Encyclopedia of Ukraine. 1993. Archived from the original on 16 July 2025.
