= Natalia Zagryazhskaya =

Russian philanthropist

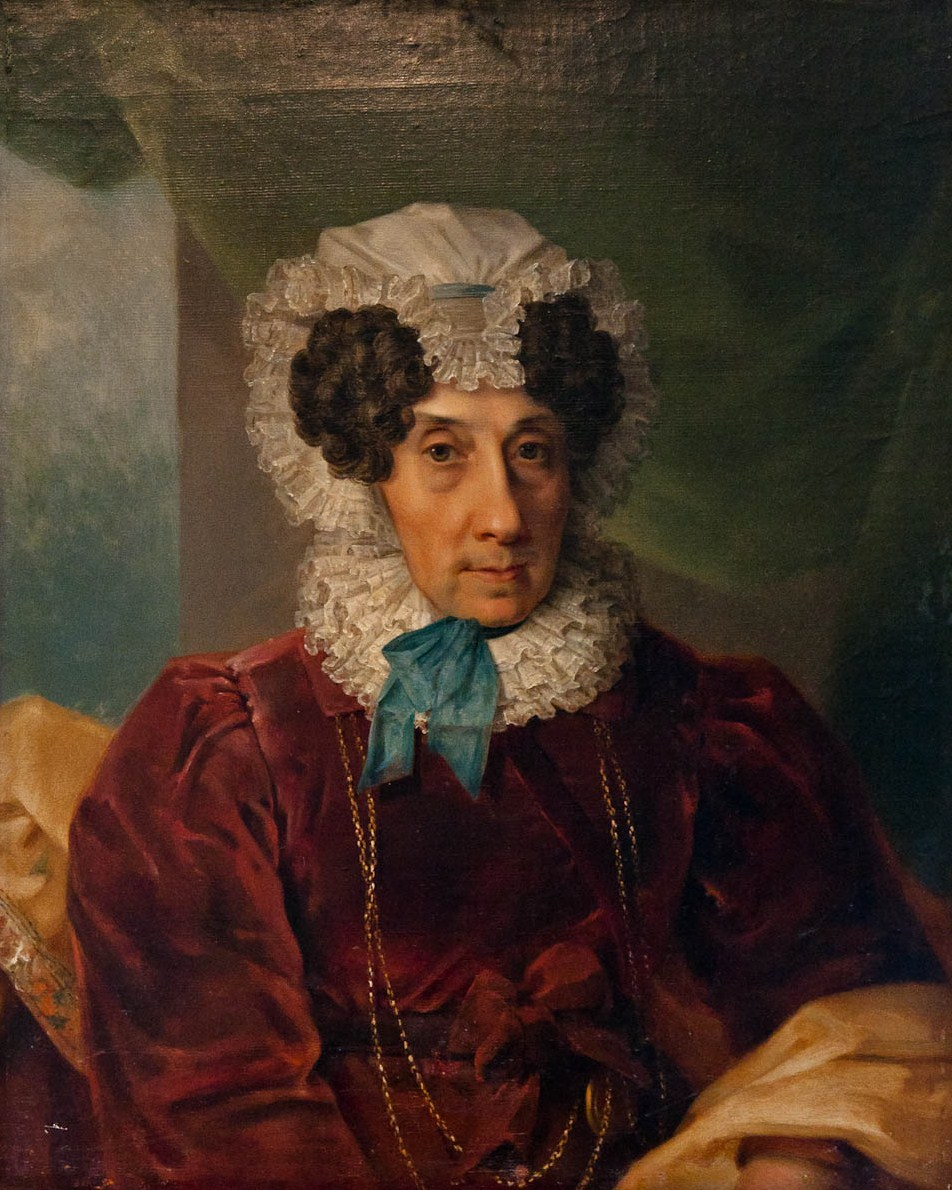
Natalia Zagryazhskaya in her old age

Countess Natalia Kirillovna Zagryazhskaya (née Razumovskaya; 5 September 1747 – 19 May 1837) was a Russian philanthropist, salonist and lady-in-waiting. She was a leading member of Saint Petersburg society from the 1770s until her death in 1837 and is often mentioned in contemporary memoirs and diaries.

== Early life ==
She was the daughter of Kirill Razumovsky, the last hetman of Ukraine, and Yekaterina Ivanova Naryshkina; her brother was the diplomat Andrey Razumovsky.

== Biography ==
In 1762 she became a lady-in-waiting to Empress Catherine the Great, and – in contrast to other ladies-in-waiting – was allowed to live at home. In 1772 she married officer Nikolai Zagryazhsky (1743–1821), but their relationship soon ended and they lived their lives apart. She was a friend of Empress Maria Fyodorovna and in 1798 was given the order of Catherine. A frequent host of members of the Imperial family, she was known as a contact person who could successfully ask them for favours on others' behalf. The poets Vasily Zhukovsky, Pyotr Vyazemsky and Alexander Pushkin were guests at her salon.

== Personal life ==
She was married to Nikolai Zagryazhski (1743-1821), Imperial court Councillor. They didn't have children. Her niece and adoptive daughter Natalia Ivanovna Zagryazhskaya (1785—1848) was the mother of Natalia Goncharova, Pushkin's wife.
