= Razumovsky =

Russian noble family

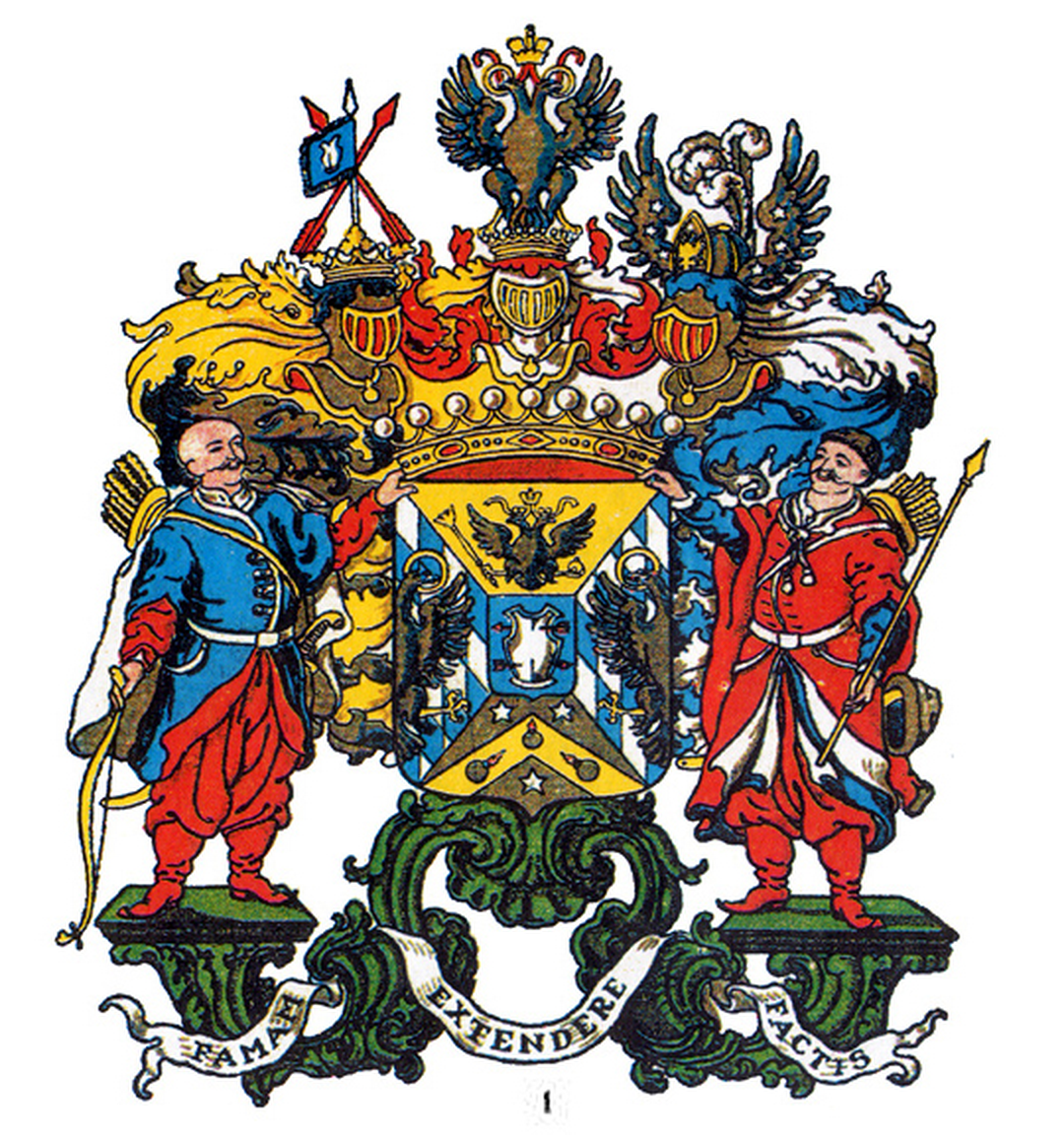
Coat of arms of the Razumovsky family (1751)

The House of Razumovsky or Rozumovsky (Russian: Разумовский, Ukrainian: Розумовський, German: Razumofsky) is the name of an Imperial Russian noble family of Zaporozhian Cossack origin from Ukraine. The main family line became extinct in the 19th century, while its Austrian branch exists to this day. The Austrian branch was started by Grigory Razumovsky, who was forced to relocate to the Austrian Empire in 1816, after he received the hereditary title of Prince in 1815 from Francis I, Emperor of Austria.

== History ==
The family traces its origin to a khutir called Lemeshi (today a village in Chernihiv Raion, Chernihiv Oblast).

Yakiv Rozum and his son Hryhoriy were registered Cossacks of the Kiev Regiment. Hryhoriy's son, Oleksiy (Alexei), was the first to use the name Rozumovsky.

Ivan Yakovlevich Rozum was raised to the rank of Count of the Holy Roman Empire by Emperor Charles VII, but died without children. His brother, Grigoriy Yakovlevich Rozum, had two children — Kirill and Alexey. After Alexey became a favorite of the Russian Empress Elizabeth of Russia, the family name was changed to Razumovsky for all Rozums. Notable representatives of the family include:

- Aleksey Grigorievich Razumovsky (1709–1771) - the favorite and possible morganatic husband of Empress Elizabeth. He was made Count of the Holy Roman Empire in Frankfurt in 1742 and Count of the Russian Empire in 1745.
- Kirill Grigorievich Razumovsky (1728–1803) - officially his younger brother, rumored to be a son from an earlier marriage, the last hetman of Left (1750–1764) and Right (1754–1764) Bank Ukraine, last Hetman of Zaporizhian Host (1754–1769), created Count of the Russian Empire in 1745.
- Aleksey Kirillovich Razumovsky (1748–1822) - the latter's first son, minister of education of the Russian Empire from 1806 to 1816, highly criticised by Pushkin for his reactionary stance;
- Andrey Kirillovich Razumovsky (1752–1836) - Kirill's second son, was the Ambassador from the Russian Empire to the Congress of Vienna. Andrey was created HSH Prince in 1815 and settled there in the end, converting to Catholicism. It was alleged that he had a role in the murders of Gustav III of Sweden and Paul I of Russia. He was architect of the Second Partition of Poland. He is remembered for his patronage of the arts, especially of the composer Ludwig van Beethoven: Beethoven both wrote the Razumovsky Quartets (Op. 59 Nos. 1, 2, and 3) for Andrey, and dedicated the 5th and 6th Symphonies to him.
Razumovsky residences

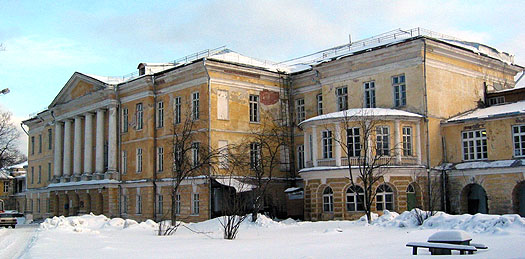
Gorenki Palace, Balashikha.

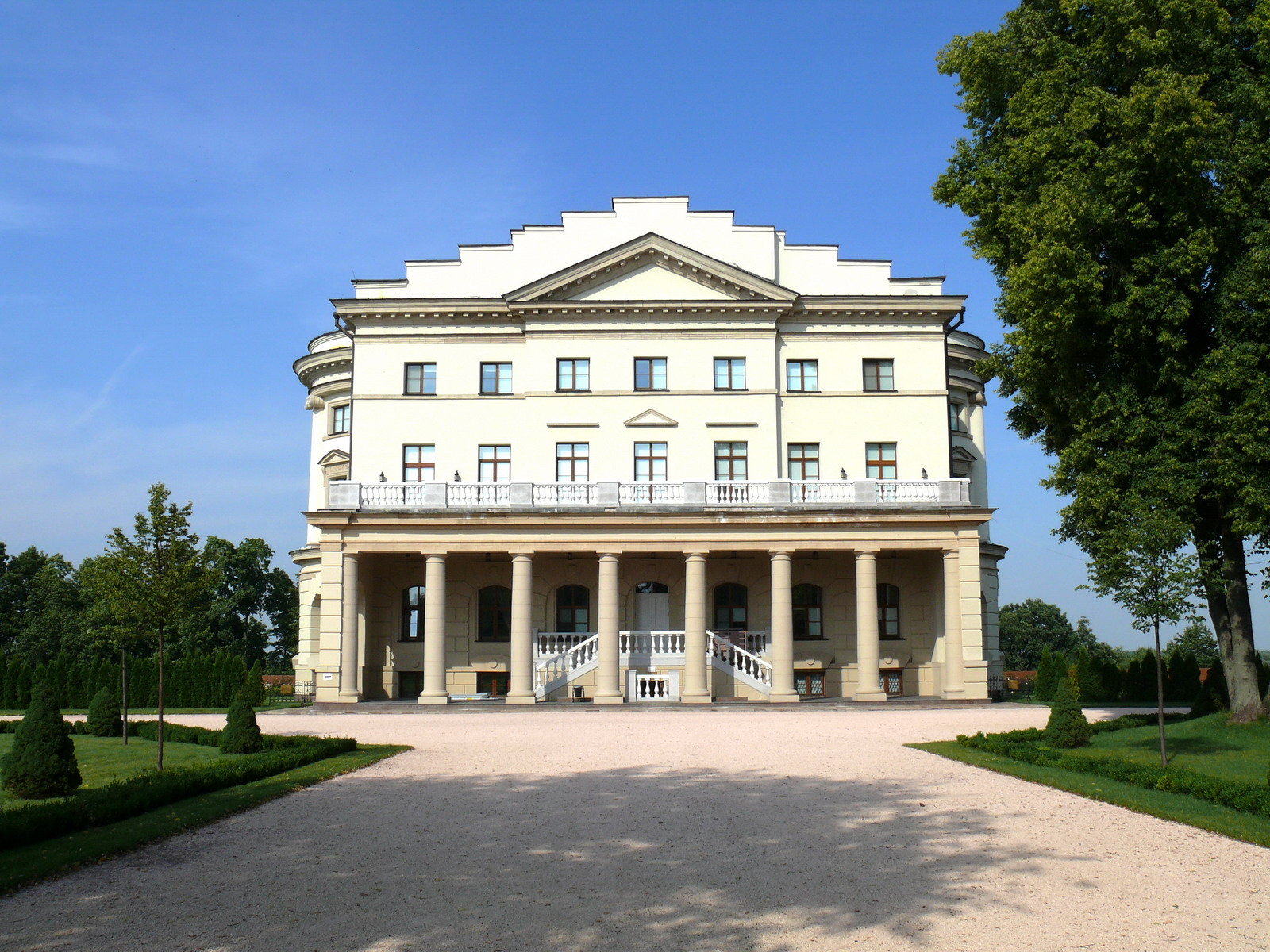
Hetman's Palace, Baturyn.

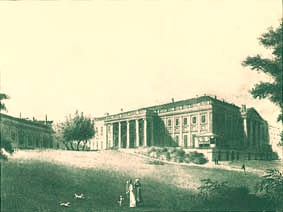
Palais Rasumofsky, Vienna.
- Grigory Kirillovich Razumovsky (1759–1837) - the fifth son of Kirill, known from his writings in the West as Gregor or Grégoire, he was a geologist, botanist and zoologist, as well as prominent political dissenter with Imperial Russia, who lost his Russian allegiance in 1811 and was subsequently incorporated into the Bohemian nobility and accorded the rank of Count in the Austrian Empire. Gregor was the first to describe and classify the Lissotrion helveticus. His branch of the family survives to this day.
- Leon (Lev) Grigorievich Razumovsky von Wigstein (1816–1868), grandson of Kirill, son of aforementioned Count Grigory and his wife, Baroness Theresa Elisabeth Schenk von Castell (1785-1818), envoy of Saxe-Coburg to the court of Napoleon III. Father of Camillo Lvovich Razumovsky.
- Kamillo Lvovich Razumovsky von Wigstein (1853–1917), son of aforementioned Count Leon and his wife, Maria Rosa Albrecht, Baroness von Löwenstern (1814-1889), philanthropist in Czech Silesia; built numerous churches, schools and hospitals around Opava (today Czech Republic) and in Western Ukraine; caused a commotion by flouting the social conventions of the 19th century Vienna when he married a woman of the Jewish faith, Marie Wiener von Welten (1856-196), daughter of Eduard, Ritter Wiener von Welten (1822-1886) and his wife, Henriette Goldschmidt (b. 1829).
- Andreas Andreievich Razumovsky von Wigstein (1929–2002), grandson of the latter, elder son of Count Andreas Wolfgang Razumovsky von Wigstein (1892-1981) and his wife, Princess Katharina zu Sayn-Wittgenstein (1895-1983), well-known political analyst and media figure in Germany and Austria; expelled from Czechoslovakia, where he had been posted as a correspondent for the Frankfurter Allgemeine Zeitung, in 1967 for warning of an imminent invasion by Warsaw Pact troops; analysed and published a book in 1981 on the forces leading to the dismembering of Yugoslavia.
- Dorothea Razumovsky von Wigstein (*1935-2014), née Princess zu Solms-Hohensolms-Lich, wife of aforementioned Count Andreas Andreievich, well-known media-figure and political analyst, widely criticised for adopting a stance during conflicts arising from the dismemberment of Yugoslavia that was interpreted as being too pro-Serb.
- Katharina Razumovsky von Wigstein (*1961), daughter of Andreas and Dorothea, artist living in Vienna, Austria and Moscow, Russia.
- Gregor (Grigoriy) Razumovsky von Wigstein (*1965), son of Andreas and Dorothea, President of the Razumovsky Society for Art and Culture, which supports artistic exchange and co-operation between East and West; also the honorary president of the European Institute for the Furtherance of Democracy, an Austrian-based think-tank.

== See also ==
- Razumovsky (disambiguation)

== Literature ==
- Maria Razumovsky. Die Rasumovskys: eine Familie am Zarenhof. Köln 1998. — 300 S.
- Разумовская М. А. Разумовские при царском дворе: Главы из российской истории, 1740-1815 гг. СПб., 2004. — 272 с.
- Розанов С. С. Родственные связи семейства Разумовских: Книга 1: Род и потомство К.Г. Разумовского. Родословная роспись: Справочное генеалогическое издание. — М.: Ирисъ, 2007. — 120 с.
