= Ivan Betskoy =

Russian educational reformer (1704–1795)

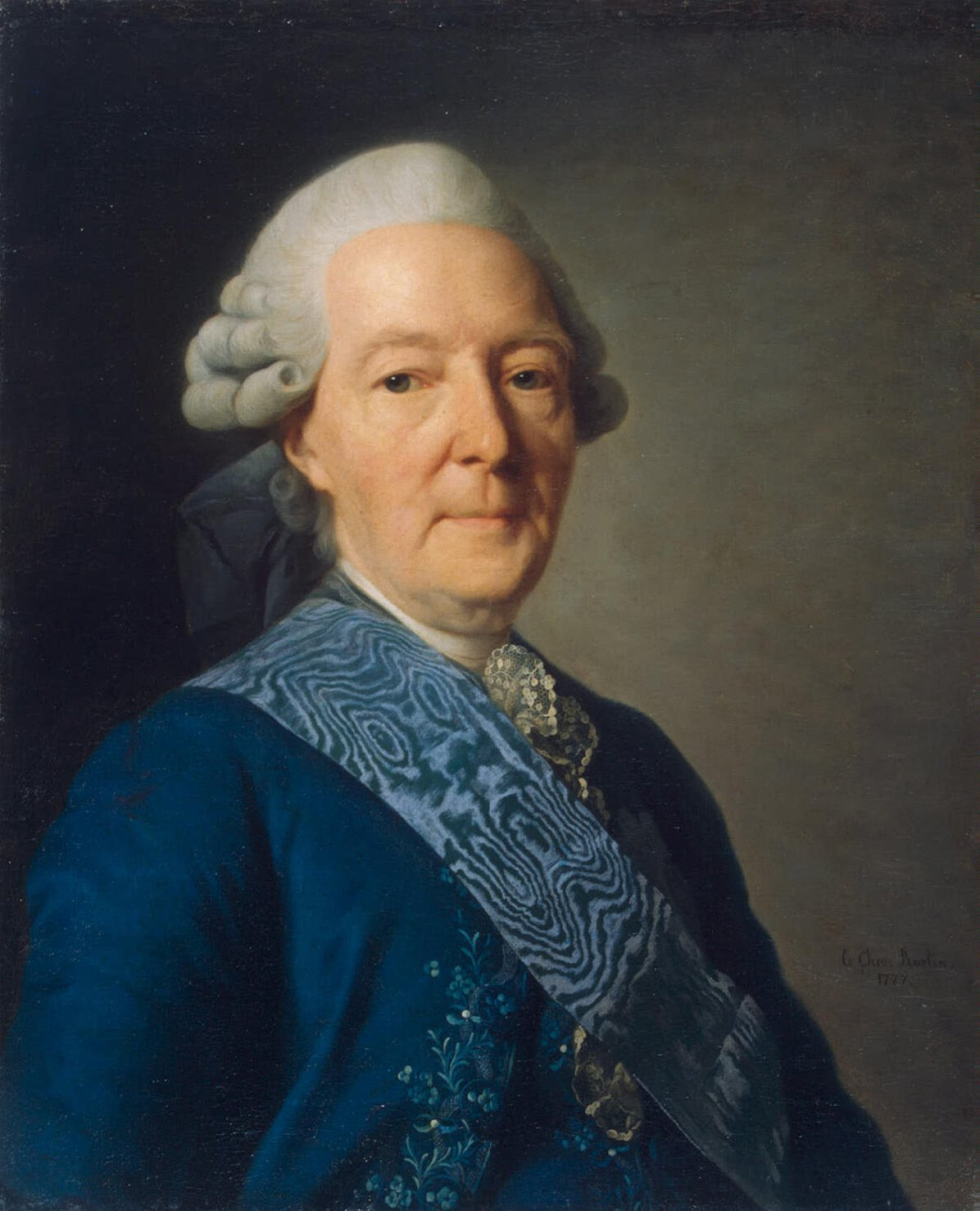
Portrait by Alexander Roslin, Saint Petersburg, Hermitage Museum (1777)

Ivan Ivanovich Betskoy or Betskoi (Russian: Ива́н Ива́нович Бецко́й; 14 February [O.S. 3 February] 1704 – 11 September [O.S. 31 August] 1795) was a Russian statesman and figure of the Russian Enlightenment. He was educational reformer who served as Catherine II's advisor on education and as president of the Imperial Academy of Arts for from 1764 to 1794. Perhaps the crowning achievement of his long career was the establishment of Russia's first unified system of public education.

== Life ==
Betskoy's parents were Prince Ivan Trubetskoy, a Russian field marshal, and his Swedish mistress, Baroness von Wrede. His surname is the abbreviated form of his father's – a tradition for Russian surnames of illegitimate children.

He was born in Stockholm, where Trubetskoy was held captive throughout the Great Northern War, and went to Copenhagen to get a military education before joining a Danish cavalry regiment. It was in the Danish service that he sustained a fall from a horse which forced him to retire from the service. Field Marshal Trubetskoy, having no other sons but Betskoy, called him to the Russian Empire in 1729. At first he served as his father's aide-de-camp but later would be sent on diplomatic missions to various capitals of Europe.

Betskoy was actively involved in a coup d'etat that brought Elizaveta Petrovna to the Russian throne. The grateful empress promoted him to General Major and asked him to attend Joanna Elisabeth of Holstein-Gottorp, whose daughter Catherine was selected as a bride for the Empress' nephew and heir, Grand Duke Peter. In truth, Betskoy had been on friendly terms with Johanna Elisabeth for two decades previous, their intimacy giving rise to rumours that Catherine was his biological daughter.

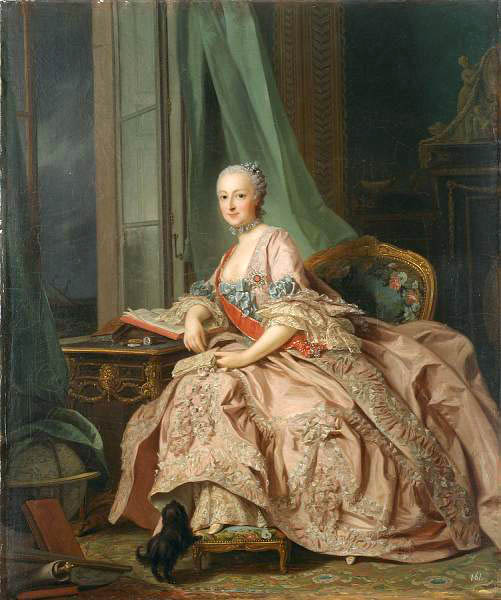
Half-sister Princess Anastasia Ivanovna Trubetskaya, Landgravine von Hesse-Homburg. Portrait by Alexander Roslin, 1757.

After Johanna Elisabeth was expelled from Russia in 1747, Betskoy found it necessary to lay down his offices and settle in Paris, where he spent the following 15 years in commerce with the Encyclopédistes especially to Jean-Jacques Rousseau. And to Denis Diderot, he was at least in correspondence with him. He was introduced to the highest echelons of the French aristocracy by his half-sister Princess Anastasia Ivanovna Trubetskaya, Landgravine von Hesse-Homburg (her first husband was Prince Demetre Cantemir, ruler of Moldavia).

Peter III of Russia recalled Betskoy to Russia and put him in charge of imperial palaces and gardens. Upon arriving to Saint Petersburg, Betskoy renewed his acquaintance with the sovereign's wife (and his own purported daughter), helping her depose Peter in 1762. His hopes to profit from his prominent share in the conspiracy were high. In her memoirs, Ekaterina Dashkova recalls an episode when Betskoy importuned the Empress with questions like "Was I not the one who incited the Guards? Was I not the one who threw money to the people?"

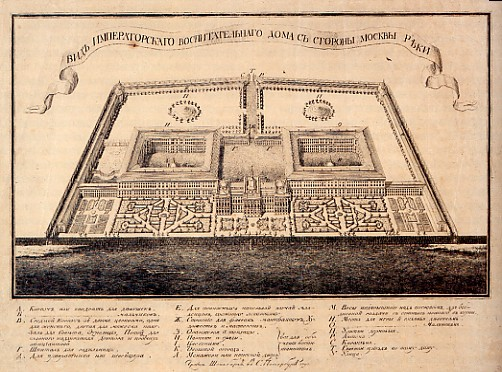
Betskoy's plan for the Foundling Home in Moscow.

Although Betskoy held no post of any consequence until 1764, when Catherine made him President of the Imperial Academy of Arts, he went on to become a pillar of the Russian establishment. His position at Catherine's court is not easy to classify. Some historians define his post as a "personal secretary"; others regard Betskoy as an "unofficial education minister" to the Empress. He was one of the few people who enjoyed unlimited access to the Tsarina on daily basis for most of her reign. It was at his suggestion that Étienne Maurice Falconet was commissioned to sculpt the Bronze Horseman; and it was he who engaged Georg von Veldten to design a magnificent iron fence for the Summer Garden.

Betskoy's influence continued unabated until the late 1780s when Catherine's tolerance towards the ideas of the Enlightenment began to be eroded and Betskoy was declared "reverting to childhood" on account of his advanced age. Death overtook him in his ninety-second year, when he had long been incapacitated by blindness. Betskoy never married and left his estates to a natural daughter who enjoyed Catherine's particular favour; she married Jose de Ribas, a Spanish adventurer who founded the city of Odessa.

== Educational reform ==
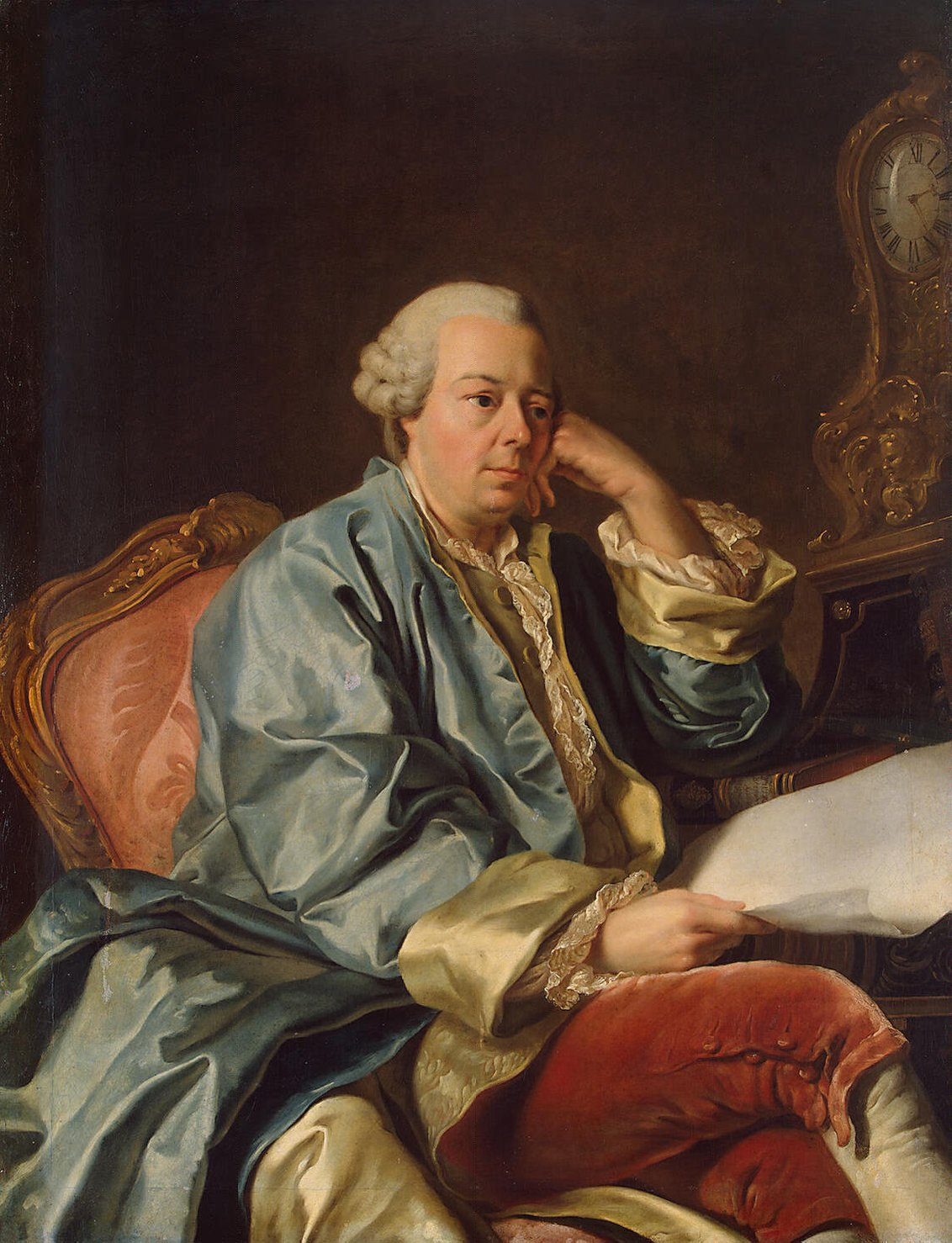
Portrait of Ivan Betskoy, by Alexander Roslin (1791)

In 1763, Betskoy presented to Catherine the Statute for the Education of the Youth of Both Sexes, studded with citations from Comenius, John Locke, and Rousseau. The treatise contained a proposal to educate young Russians of both sexes in state boarding schools, aimed at creating "a new race of men". Betskoy set forth a number of arguments for general education of children rather than specialized one: "in regenerating our subjects by an education founded on these principles, we will create... new citizens." Boarding schools were to be preferred to other institutions of education in accordance with Rousseau's notion that "isolating the pupils enabled their tutors to protect them from the vices of society."

The Empress endorsed his proposal and established the Society for the Training of Well-Born Girls, with Betskoy as a trustee. This so-called Smolny Institute of Noble Maidens was the first female educational institution in Russia and one of the first in Europe. The Smolny was to become a training ground for Rousseau's ideas on education: the girls – viewed as the future centers of their families – were protected from every pernicious influence and their moral education was given more prominence than intellectual one. The Empress personally maintained a correspondence with some of the pupils, perhaps viewing the school for women as a vindication of her own place at the pinnacle of Russian society.

For the students of this institution Betskoy and Catherine brought out an instruction entitled On the Duties of Man and Citizen. This essay not only discussed the pupil's duties in regard to God and to society but also contained practical advice on health, hygiene, and other everyday matters. An extensive collection of Betskoy's aids and manuals was published in Amsterdam in 1775. This edition was revised and expanded to two volumes printed in 1789–1791.

Born out of wedlock himself and anxious to reduce the frequency of infanticide, Betskoy found in illegitimate children and orphans an ideal material for implementing his educational theories. It was by his advice that two large foundling homes were established, first in Moscow (1764) and then in Saint Petersburg (1770). The Saint Petersburg Foundling House was a precursor of the modern Herzen University. Not less potent was his encouragement of education for merchant's sons. Betskoy deplored the fact that "we have only two classes of society, either peasants or noblemen" and sought to spur the development of middle-class consciousness by establishing a commercial school in Moscow.

== Sources ==
- "Бецкий, Иван Иванович" . Brockhaus and Efron Encyclopedic Dictionary (in Russian). 1906.
