= Development of the administrative divisions of Ukraine =

Administrative divisions development in Ukraine reviews the history of changes in the administrative divisions of Ukraine, in chronological order.

== Russian Empire ==
The Russian Empire had acquired much of the territory inhabited by Ukrainians between the mid 17th and early 19th centuries, which was organized into nine Ukrainian governorates: Chernigov (Chernihiv in Ukrainian), Yekaterinoslav (Katerynoslav), Kiev (Kyiv), Kharkov (Kharkiv), Kherson, Podolia (Podillia), Poltava, Volhynia (Volyn), and the mainland part of Taurida (or Tavriia, without the Crimean peninsula). Additional lands annexed from Poland in 1815 were organized into the Kholm governorate in 1912.

== Ukrainian People's Republic (1917–1921) ==
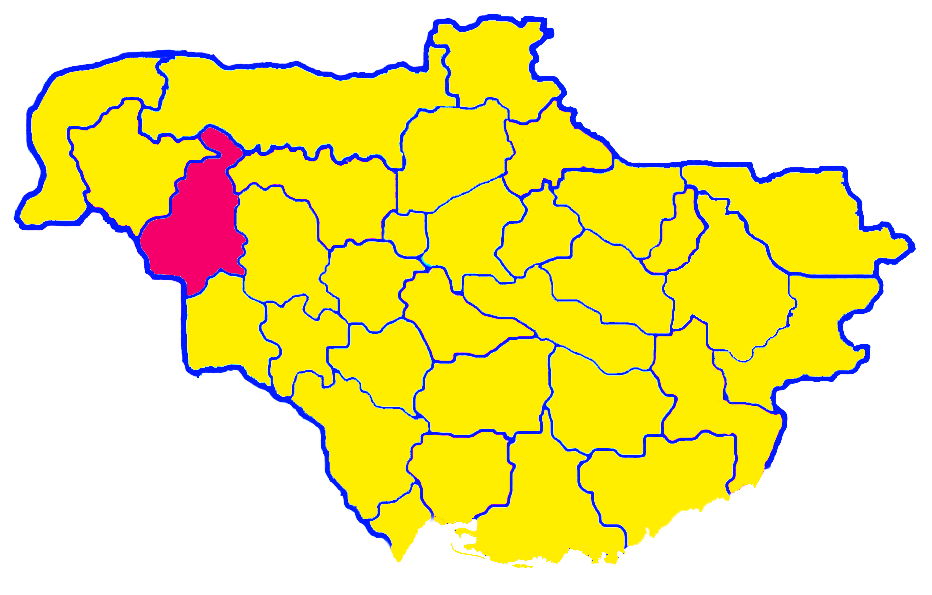
Pohoryna zemlia

After the creation of the Ukrainian People's Republic in 1917, the Russian governorates inhabited by Ukrainians became subdivisions of Ukraine. In 1918, there was a not fully realized territorial administrative reform in the Ukrainian People's Republic, where the country was divided into zemlias, volosts, and hromadas.

The West Ukrainian People's Republic in former Austro-Hungarian Empire territory was not subdivided into governorates, and would be annexed by the Second Polish Republic from 1919 until the Soviet invasion of 1939.

== Overview of Soviet Ukraine (1919–1991) ==
During the existence of Soviet Ukraine its administration division went through three changes.

- governorate, 1919–1925
  - povit (county)
    - volost
- subdistrict, 1925–1936
  - okruha (district)
    - raion
- oblast, 1936–1991
  - raion and district (border okruha)

== Before World War II ==

In 1919, the northern Mhlyn, Novozybkiv, Starodub, and Surazh counties of Chernihiv Governorate, with their mixed Ukrainian–Belarusian–Russian population, were transferred from Ukraine to the newly established Gomel Governorate of the Russian republic. In February 1924, Tahanrih and Shakhty counties (Tahanrizka okruha and Shakhtynska okruha) were transferred from the Donetsk Governorate of the Ukrainian SSR to the North Caucasus Krai of the Russian SFSR.

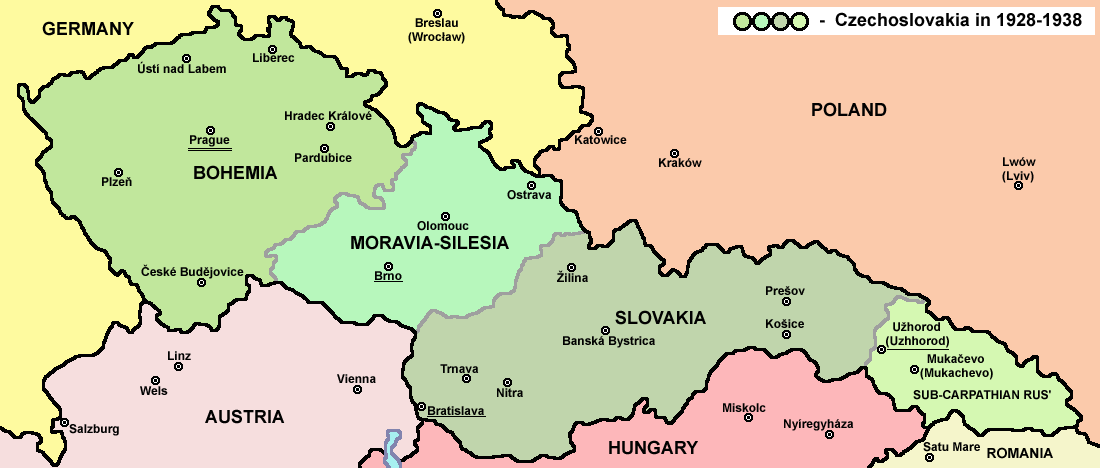

Just before World War II, Hungary with the help from Poland occupied Carpatho-Ukraine that was to secede from the falling apart Czechoslovakia after the Munich Agreement plus some additional territories of Slovakia. Poland in turn also occupied some territories of Silesia.

In the fall of 1938, the southwestern territories of Subcarpathian Rus including the cities of Uzhhorod, Berehove, and Mukacheve were yielded to the Kingdom of Hungary.

In 1939, Carpatho-Ukraine was overrun by the Kingdom of Hungary.

Some of the newly acquired territories in 1939 were annexed and incorporated as Kárpátalja. Kárpátalja unlike most of the country, however, had a special administrative system with the intention of it being governed by the Ruthenian minority population. In practice, it was not the case. Kárpátalja was divided into three administrative delegations (közigazgatási kirendeltség) which were each divided into four districts (járás). The previously annexed territories of 1938 were divided into Bereg County and Ung County.

== World War II ==
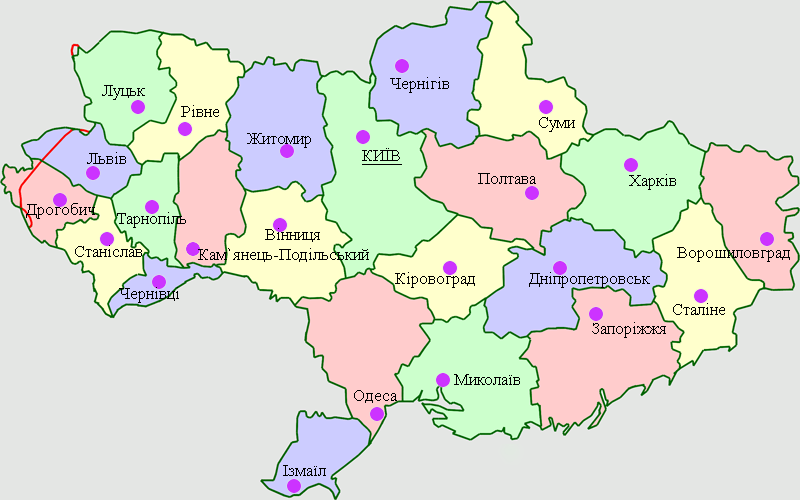

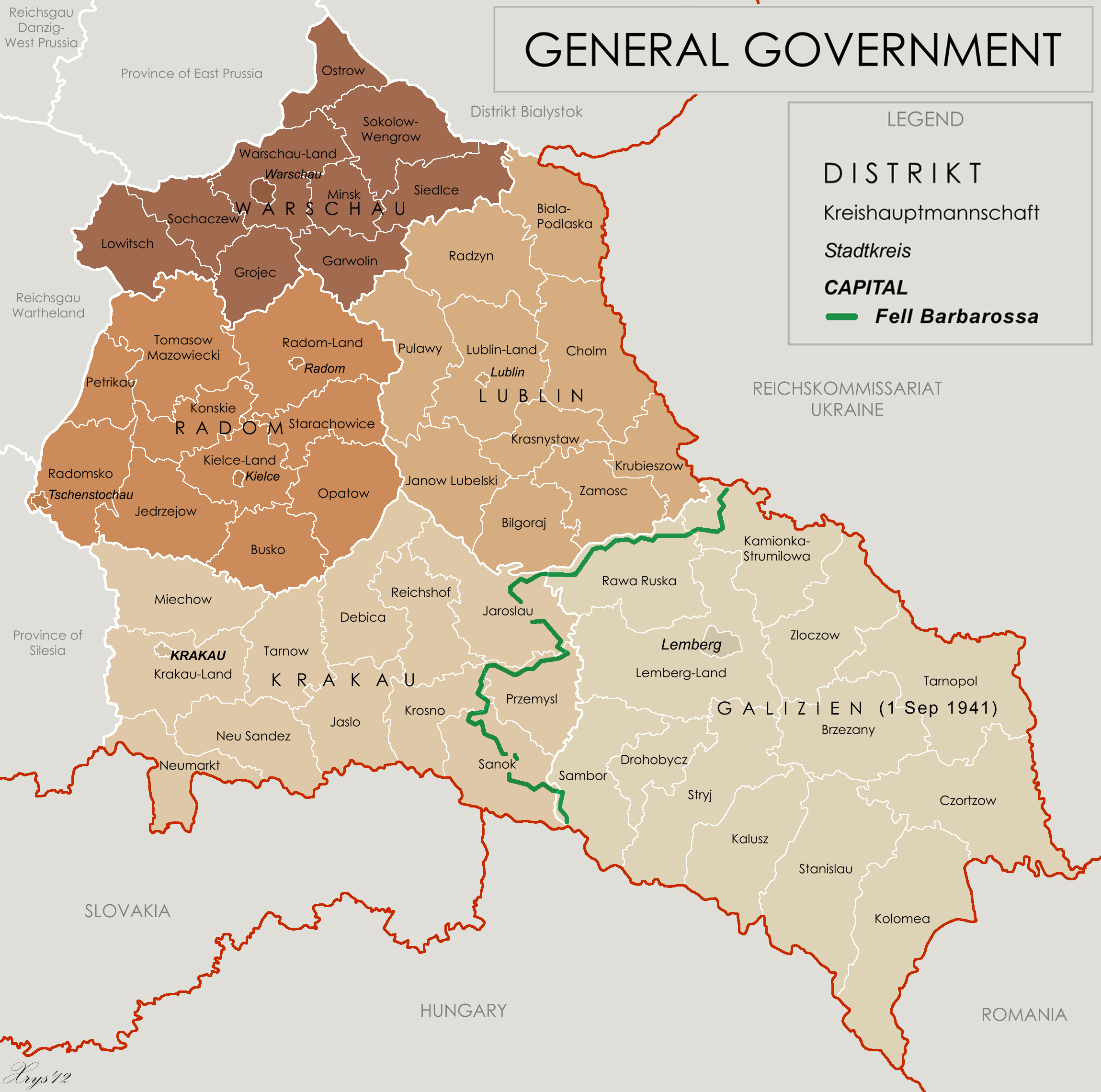

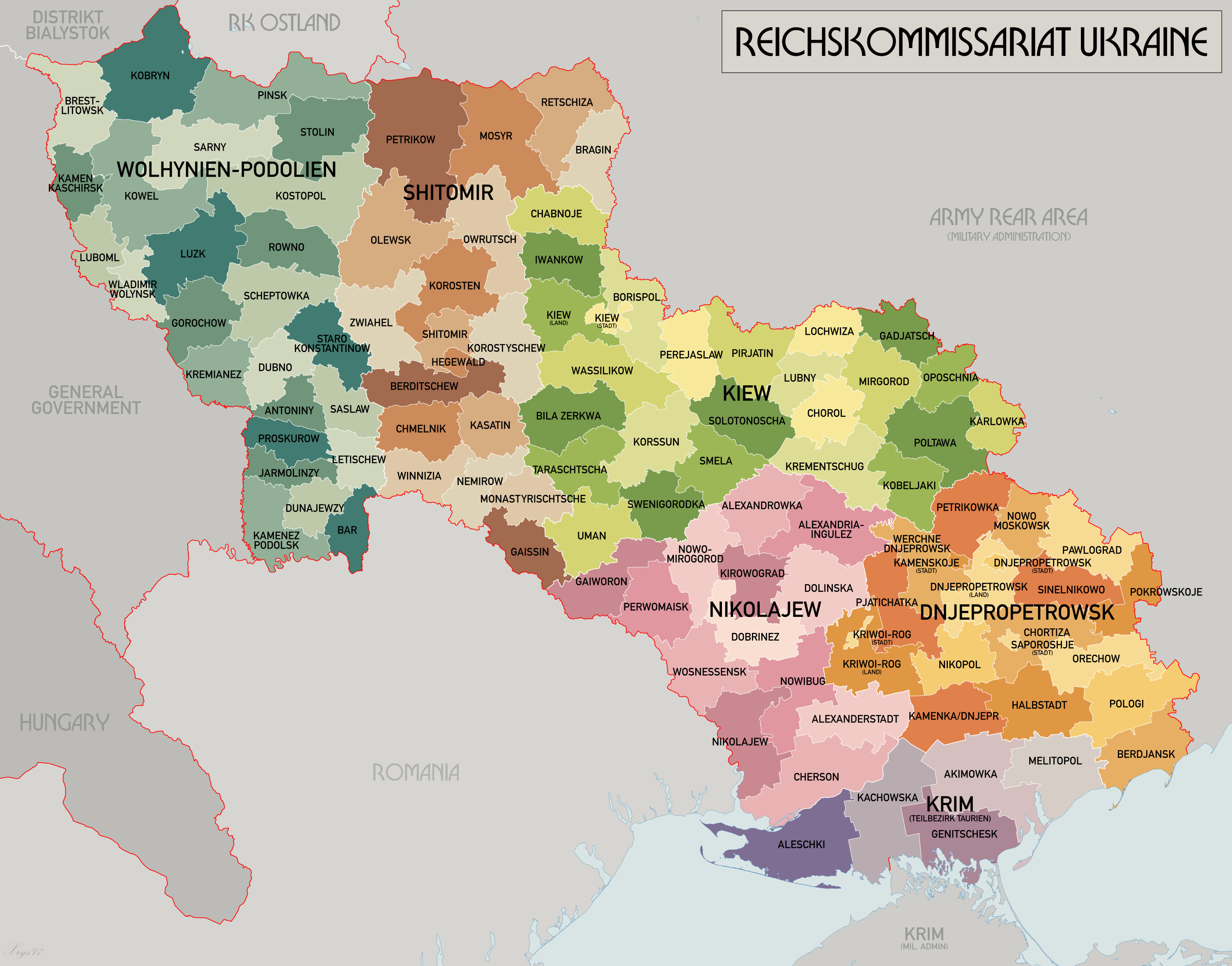

In 1939 and 1940, the Soviet Union launched an offensive into eastern Poland and eastern Romania. During these operations, the territories of Volhynia, Halychyna, Bukovina, and Budjak were added to the Ukrainian SSR. In the territories of Volhynia and Halychyna, six oblasts were created in 1939: Lviv Oblast, Drohobych Oblast, Stanislav Oblast, Ternopil Oblast, Volyn Oblast, and Rivne Oblast. In 1940, Bukovina was organized as Chernivtsi Oblast and Budjak as Izmail Oblast.

After the German invasion of 1941, Ukraine was split between three countries, Germany, Romania, and Hungary. Within Germany Ukraine also was divided between the General Government (Krakau), Reichskommisariat (centered in Rivne), and Wehrmacht administration closer to the Eastern Front.

=== General Government ===
Western Ukraine around Lviv was part of the General Government as Distrikt Galizien which was added to four other existing districts with the invasion of the Soviet Union. Distrikt Galizien consisted of 13 land-kreis and one stadtkreis (Lemberg). Some other territories that had been incorporated into the Ukrainian SSR in 1939 were passed to other Distrikts, mostly Krakau.

=== Reichskommissariat Ukraine ===
Most of Ukraine was under a "civil administration" of Reichskommissariat Ukraine with capital in Rowno. Some territories also included former parts of Belarus. Reichskommissariat was divided into five General-bezirke and one Teil-bezirke Taurien (Krim):

- Wolhynien und Podolien (Luzk) - 25 Kreisgebiete,
- Shitomir - 17 Kreisgebiete,
- Kiew - 24 Kreisgebiete,
- Nikolajew - 13 Kreisgebiete,
- Dnjepropetrowsk - 16 Kreisgebiete,
- Krim (Melitopol) - 5 Kreisgebiete.

Each Generalbezirke consisted of several Kreisgebiete which in turn were divided into selsoviets. Krim, however, did not in reality encompass territory of the Crimean peninsula which was under a special jurisdiction of Wehrmacht. Territories of Ukraine (Donets basin and Sloboda Ukraine) also stayed under the Wehrmacht jurisdiction due to a close proximity to front-lines. It was planned to extend the territory of such Ukraine all the way to Volga river adding some other General-bezirke.

=== Romania ===

Romania liberated the south-western part of Ukrainian Soviet Socialist Republic from the foreign rule, more specifically the area which today constitutes Odesa Oblast eastward of the Dniester and southern Vinnytsia Oblast, land inhabited mostly by Romanians a few centuries ago. Those territories were organized into the province of Transnistria. Romania also recovered Budjak (Izmail Oblast) and Northern Bukovina (Chernivtsi Oblast), territories with Romanian ethnic majority, which Romania lost in the beginning of World War II.

- Transnistria - organized as the Transnistria Governorate with 13 județe ("counties"), subdivided into towns and raionul (raions).
- Budjak was annexed to the Bessarabia Governorate organized into three județe.
- Northern Bukovina was annexed to the Bukovina Governorate organized into four județe.

== Polish-Soviet border changes (1944–1951) ==
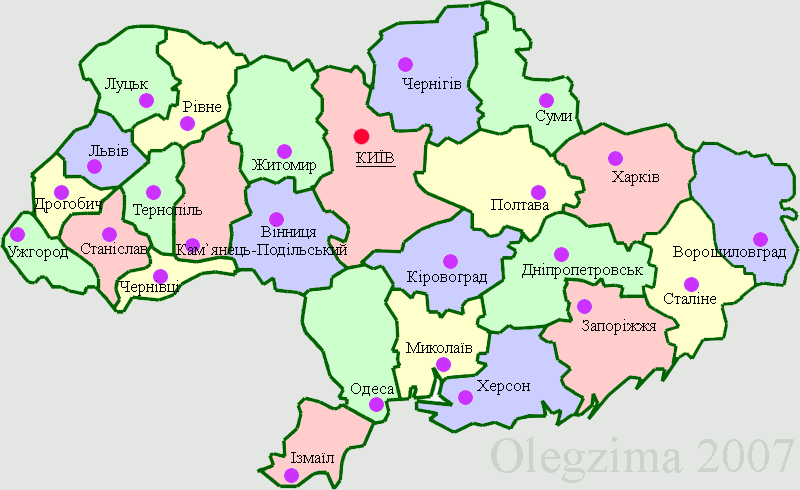

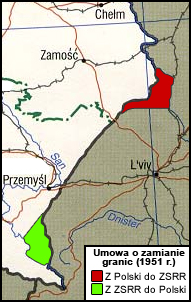
Polish-Soviet border changes

Between 1944 and 1951 the border between the Ukrainian SSR and the Polish People's Republic changed a lot. There were at least five territorial transfers.

- October 1944 to Poland were transferred Horynets Raion, Lubachiv Raion, Uhniv Raion, Synyava Raion, and Lyashkiv Raion of the Lviv Oblast.
- March 1945 to Poland also were transferred Bircha Raion, Liski Raion, and western part of Peremyshl Raion with the city of Peremyshl from the Drohobych Oblast.
- May 1948 to Poland was also transferred Medyka Raion of Drohobych Oblast.
- In 1951 Drohobych Oblast yielded Nyzhno-Ustritsa Raion to Poland as well.
- February 15, 1951, several Polish localities were transferred to Ukraine as part of the territorial exchange which formed Zabuzk Raion with seat in Belz, including the city of Krystynopil. Later Zabuzk Raion was reassigned under Sokal Raion of Lviv Oblast.

=== Other changes (1944–1946) ===
A new Kherson Oblast was created during the war on March 30, 1944, out of the territories of Mykolaiv Oblast and Zaporizhzhia Oblast. Furthermore, a few raions of Odesa Oblast (including the city of Voznesensk and its surrounding areas), were transferred to Mykolaiv Oblast.

Beside a Ukrainian-Polish border exchange on January 22, 1946, the Zakarpattia Oblast was also created out of newly acquired Czechoslovakia territories, where Carpatho-Ukraine had been proclaimed just before World War II.

== 1954 ==
Big changes in the administrative division in Ukraine took place in winter of 1954.

The new Cherkasy Oblast was created on January 7, mostly out of the southern raions of Kyiv Oblast, and some raions of Poltava and Kirovohrad Oblasts.

On February 15 Izmail Oblast was merged into Odesa Oblast. Several raions of the previous Odesa Oblast were transferred to the neighboring Kirovohrad and Mykolaiv Oblasts.

The Crimean Oblast was transferred from Russia to Ukraine on February 19.

== Oblast changes (1954–1991) ==
Before the fall of Soviet Union in 1992 the Ukrainian SSR consisted of 25 oblasts and two cities of republican subordination, Kyiv and Sevastopol.

In 1958 Voroshylovhrad Oblast was renamed Luhansk, then in 1970 back to Voroshylovhrad, and in 1990 once again to Luhansk.

May 21, 1959, Drohobych Oblast was merged into Lviv Oblast.

1965 Talalaiv Raion was transferred from Sumy Oblast to Chernihiv Oblast.

1986 Chornobyl Raion and the city municipality of Prypiat were liquidated and merged with the Ivankiv Raion, Kyiv Oblast.

In 1988 the new city of Slavutych was established for victims of the Chornobyl catastrophe, in Chernihiv Oblast. The city was subordinated to the Kyiv Oblast.

On February 12, 1991, the Crimean oblast was restored to its pre-WWII status of autonomous Soviet socialist republic following a referendum.

== Contemporary Ukraine ==

After its declaration of independence in August 1991, and the dissolution of the Soviet Union in December, Ukraine grandfathered most of the Soviet system of administrative divisions.

- 24 oblasts
- 2 cities with special status
- 1 autonomous republic
  - 490 raions
    - 1469 hromadas
  - urban raions

In February 1992, the Crimean ASSR's parliament renamed it the Republic of Crimea, and in 1998 the Ukrainian parliament renamed it Autonomous Republic of Crimea, following disputes over the republic's constitution and level of autonomy. In February 2014, Russian forces occupied the peninsula including the Autonomous Republic of Crimea and city of Sevastopol, and in March formally annexed the territories to the Russian Federation, although it remained internationally recognized as part of Ukraine.

After the start of the war in Donbas in the oblasts of Donetsk and Luhansk in April 2014, Ukrainian government forces fought to hold territory against separatist militias with a significant level of Russian manpower and military support. After a period of intense warfare involving Russian regular forces in 2014 and 2015, a ceasefire was declared and a relatively stable line of contact was established, although the semi-frozen conflict has continued to cost thousands of lives along the so-called grey zone that surrounds the line of contact. About a third of the area of the two Donbas oblasts remain under the de facto control of Russian-supported self-proclaimed Donetsk and Luhansk people's republics. In these cities and raions where the respective local governments cannot exercise their constitutional powers, Ukraine created civil–military administrations in February 2015.

=== Administrative reform of 2015 ===
In 2015 a new type of administrative unit was created, the amalgamated hromada, to help the financial and administrate power and independence of rural Ukraine. This means that settlement councils, rural councils, and cities of district significance can create new administrative units. According to draft constitutional changes submitted to the Verkhovna Rada (Ukraine's parliament) by President Volodymyr Zelenskyy in December 2019, the hromadas should replace the raions of Ukraine.

=== Administrative reform of 2020 ===
Raions of Ukraine after October 2020

On 17 July 2020, the Verkhovna Rada (Ukraine's parliament) approved an administrative reform to merge most of the 490 raions, along with the "cities of regional significance" which had been separate from raions, into just 136 reformed raions. These 136 districts include ten in Crimea and several in Donetsk and Luhansk oblasts, which were and remain under Russian control. New third-level hromadas have taken over most tasks of the raions (education, healthcare, sport facilities, culture, and social welfare).

=== Administrative reform of 2023 ===
On 24 October 2023 President Volodymyr Zelenskyy signed Law No. 8263 that abolished the concept of "urban-type settlement" in Ukraine. Law No. 8263 was meant to facilitate "de-Sovietization of the procedure for solving certain issues of the administrative and territorial system of Ukraine." (In 1991 Ukraine became independent of the Soviet Union.) The only official classifications of inhabited locality in Ukraine remained a city (misto, an urban locality), a settlement (selyshche, a rural locality with a population of at least 5,000) and village (selo, a rural locality of less than 5,000).

== See also ==
- Administrative division of Ukraine (1918)
- Administrative divisions of Ukraine (1918–1925)
- Administrative divisions of Ukraine (1925–1932)
- Administrative divisions of the Ukrainian SSR
- Administrative divisions of Ukraine
- Soviet occupation of Bessarabia and Northern Bukovina
- Invasion of Poland
- Chernobyl catastrophe
