= Administrative divisions of the Ukrainian Soviet Socialist Republic =

During its existence from 1919 to 1991, the Ukrainian Soviet Socialist Republic consisted of many administrative divisions. Itself part of the highly centralized Soviet Union, sub-national divisions in the Ukrainian SSR were subordinate to higher executive authorities and derived their power from them. Throughout the Ukrainian SSR's history, other national subdivisions were established in the republic, including guberniyas and okrugs, before finally being reorganized into their present structure as oblasts. At the time of the Ukrainian SSR's independence from the Soviet Union, the country was composed of 25 oblasts (provinces) and two cities with special status, Kiev, the capital, and Sevastopol, respectively.

== Background ==
Prior to the First World War, most of the Ukrainian lands were integrated into the Imperial Russian structure of guberniyas (Governorate) which in turn split into uezds and volosts. The map to the right shows the outline of the governorates with regard to modern division of Ukraine. These included Volhynia, Podolia, Kiev, Poltava, Kharkov and Taurida, Kherson, Yekaterinoslav, the larger part of Chernigov Governorate, small parts of Bessarabia, Kursk and Don Host Oblast, and bordering regions of the Minsk and Orel Governorates. The structure has remained stable throughout the 19th century, with minor variations. In 1912, and additional Kholm Governorate was formed out of Vistula Land and passed to the Southwestern Krai.

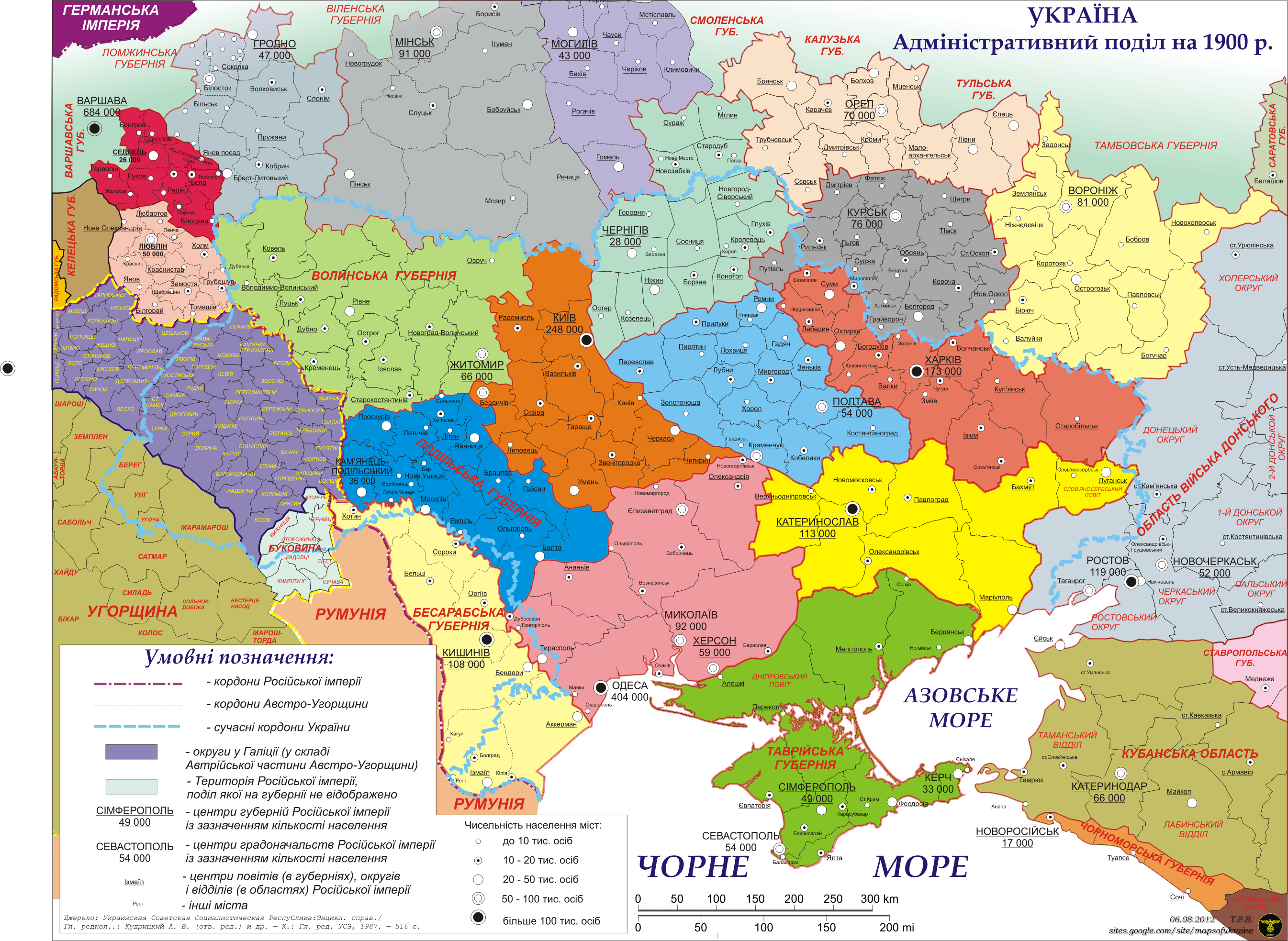
Ukraine's modern border superimposed on the administrative division of 1900 for both the Russian and the Austro-Hungarian Empires.

After the February Revolution in Petrograd, the Central Council of Ukraine was proclaimed in Kyiv, initially as an autonomous entity within future Russia. The Russian Provisional Government recognised the competency of this administration of only five Ukrainian governorates: Kyiv, Chernigov, Poltava, Podolia and Volhynia.

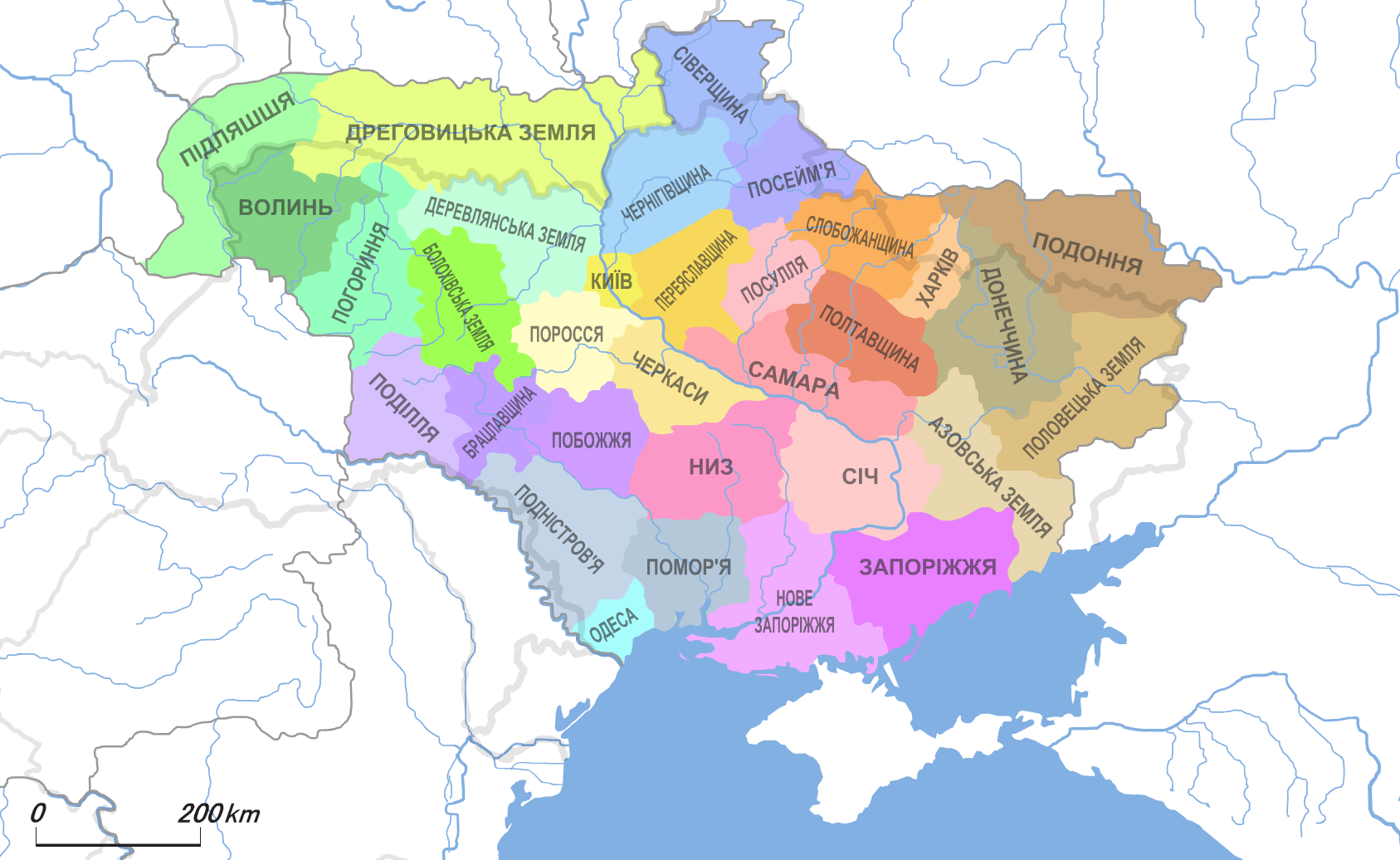
The 1918 Ukrainian administrative territorial reform

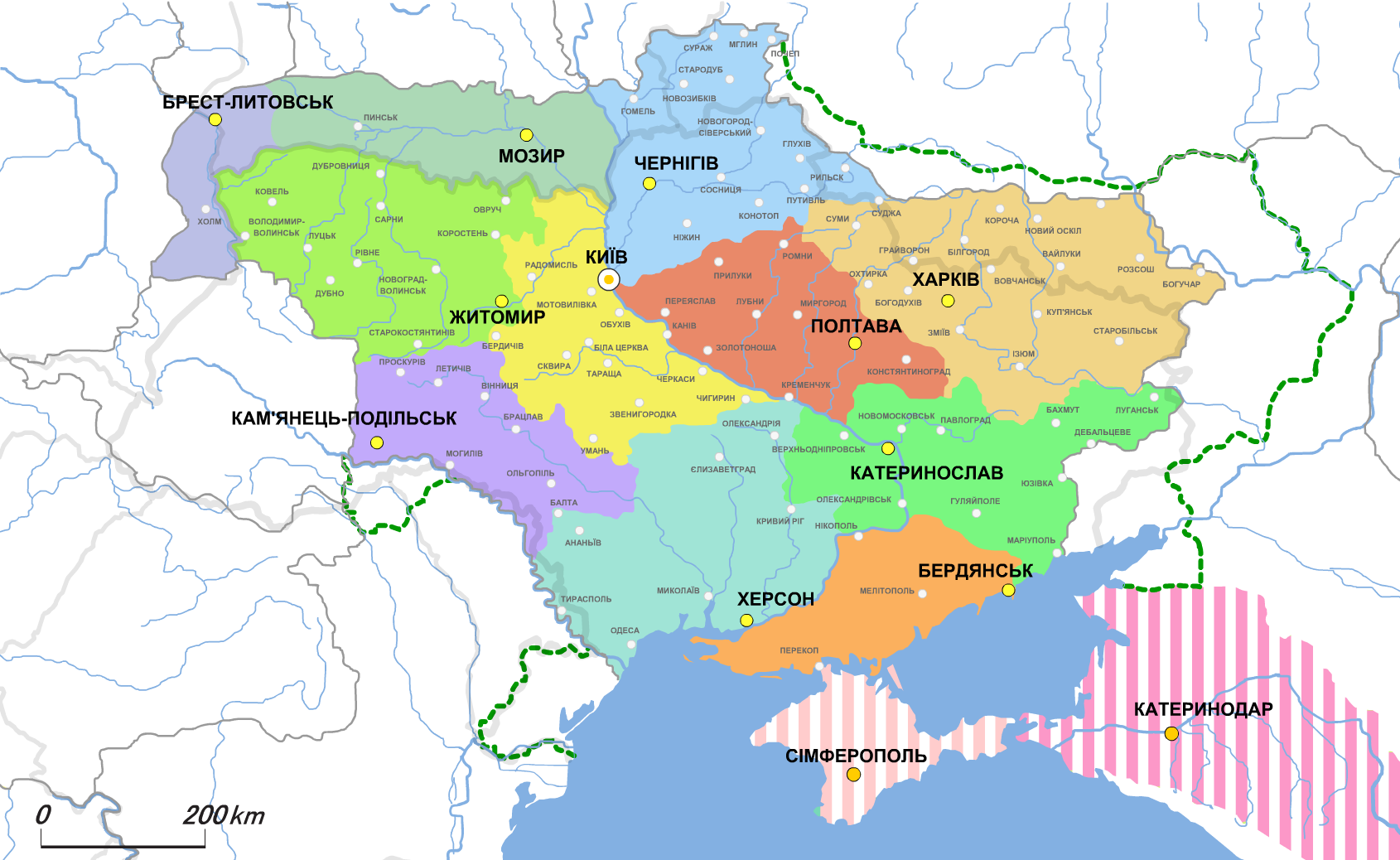
Administrative territorial division of Ukraine after abortion of the reform

With the Communist October Revolution and fall of the Provisional Government, the Central Council government extended its claims to all nine governorates where according to the 1897 Russian Census more population was Ukrainophone. After several failed attempts to take power in Kyiv and despite holding cease fire negotiations with Central Powers, Bolsheviks sent an expeditionary force of Vladimir Antonov-Ovseyenko to overthrow the government of the Central Council. The Central Council in its turn appealed for military support to the Central Powers to stop the Russian invasion during which number of Soviet puppet states sprung across the whole Ukraine such as Odesa Soviet Republic and Donetsk-Krivoy Rog Soviet Republic eventually re-uniting in March 1918 into a single Ukrainian Soviet Republic.

With help of the German Army, Ukrainian forces managed to remove the Russian occupation forces. The Ukrainian government attempted to implement its own administrative territorial reform by reviving the long forgotten Ukrainian term zemlia which would replace the system of governorates and counties (uyezd). On March 6, 1918, the Central Council of Ukraine passed the law to start the reform. By the end of April however, Pavlo Skoropadsky with the help of German military administration in Kyiv caused a coup d'état establishing the Hetmanate. The reform that lasted less than for two months was aborted. The previous governorates were returned, while certain changes took places in regards to borders. The Kharkov Governorate was enlarged eastward overtaken territories of the east Sloboda Ukraine. In place of "continental" part Taurida Governorate, there was created the Taurida Okruha (district). Ukraine also received southern portions of the Belarusian governorates creating the Polissia Okruha.

== Governorates ==
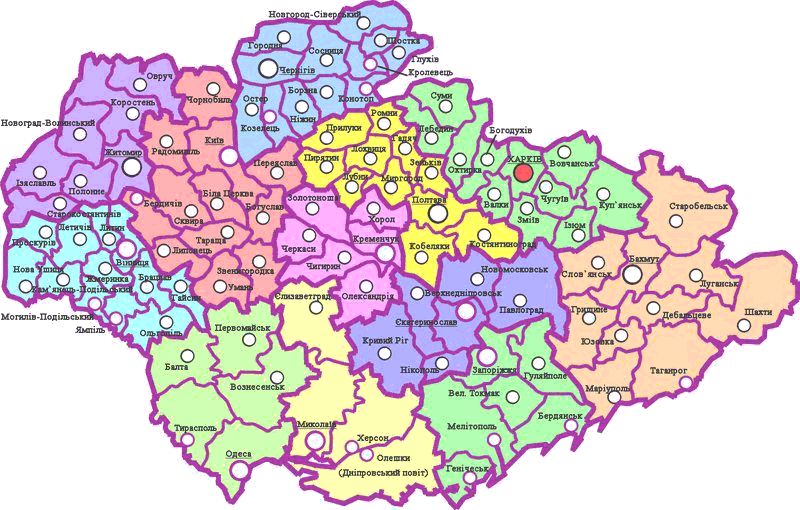
Administrative divisions in 1921 consisted of Huberniias and povits.

Until the Riga Peace Treaty with Poland on 18 March 1921 the Ukrainian SSR had the governmental administrative division of Imperial Russia and consisted of ten guberniyas. That administrative division was confirmed during the establishment of the Ukrainian State in 1918 when the Red Army withdrew from Ukraine following the Treaty of Brest-Litovsk with Central Powers.

1. Chernihiv Governorate
2. Katerynoslav Governorate
3. Kharkiv Governorate
4. Kherson Governorate, later reformed into Odessa Governorate
5. Kyiv Governorate
6. Podolia Governorate
7. Poltava Governorate
8. Volhynian Governorate

In 1920-1921 series of territorial changes took place as well as changing in administrative division.

16 April 1920

- Donetsk Governorate was created out of the surrounding Kharkiv, Katerynoslav Governorates and the Don Army Oblast. It was initially created in 1919, but with the advance of Anton Denikin its reorganization was temporarily halted.
- Kremenchuk Governorate was created out of bordering areas of Poltava, Kyiv, and Kherson Governorates.
- Zaporizhzhia Governorate was created out Katerynoslav Governorate and Taurida Governorate (initially as Aleksandrovsk)
- Odesa Governorate was split from the Kherson Governorate once again with the last changing name to Mykolaiv Governorate and acquiring the Dniprovsk uyezd of the Taurida Governorate while the peninsula became part of the Russian SFSR (later forming an autonomous republic).

18 March 1921 (Peace of Riga)

- Kholm Governorate being occupied by Polish forces was secured after Poland.
- Five full uyezds and partially the Ostroh uyezd of Volhynian Governorate were transferred to Poland.
- Four povits of Chernigov Governorate were transferred to the Homel Governorate of Russian SFSR.

21 October 1922

- Zaporizhzhia Governorate was annexed to Katerinoslav Governorate
- Mykolaiv Governorate was annexed to Odesa Governorate
- Kremenchuk Governorate was liquidate

== Oblasts ==
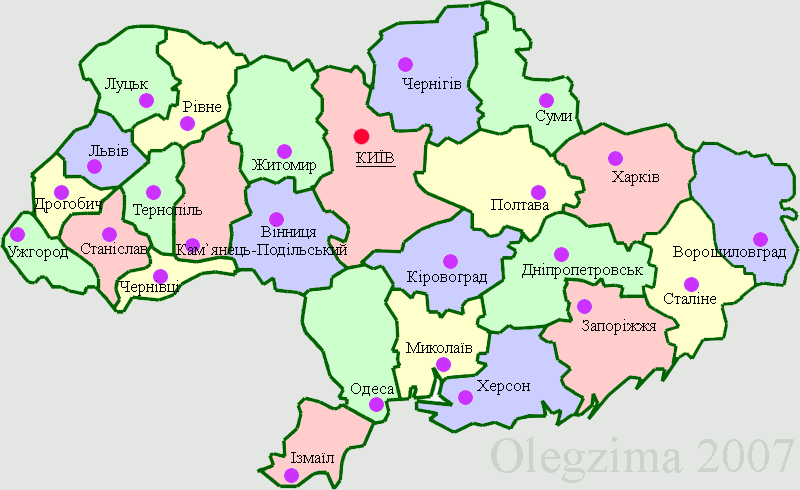
Subdivisions in 1953, pictured with 25 oblasts; Crimea would be transferred in 1954 and the Drohobych and Izmail oblasts would be absorbed by the Lviv and Odessa oblasts respectively.

=== Initial development ===
The raion system proved very difficult to administer wholly, and on February 27, 1932, they were grouped into five oblasts, though Moldovan ASSR was kept:

- Vinnytsia Oblast
- Odessa Oblast
- Dnipropetrovsk Oblast
- Kharkiv Oblast
- Kyiv Oblast

The latter three were soon partitioned in the same year to create the following two oblasts:

- Donetsk Oblast (from Dnipropetrovsk and Kharkiv) on 2 July 1932
- Chernihiv Oblast (from Kyiv) on 15 October 1932

It was during this configuration, that Ukraine underwent the first two five-year plans, (a consequence of which was the catastrophic Holodomor famine in 1933), and the collectivization and industrialization that they brought. In 1934 the capital moved to Kyiv, and on 30 January 1937, the Supreme Rada of the Ukrainian Socialist Soviet Republic adopted its version of the 1936 Soviet Constitution creating the Ukrainian Soviet Socialist Republic. To meet the economic and social demands, a restructure in the administrative division was initiated, and 22 September 1937 four more oblasts were added to the existing seven.

- Zhytomyr Oblast
- Kamianets-Podilskyi Oblast (with its centre in Proskuriv beginning in 1941)
- Mykolaiv Oblast
- Poltava Oblast

As the Donbas continued to grow both industrially and in population, on 3 July 1938, the Donetsk Oblast was effectively split into two:

- Staline Oblast
- Voroshylovhrad Oblast

In a further re-structure 10 January 1939 the twelve existing oblasts and one republic were joined by a further three:

- Zaporizhia Oblast
- Kirovohrad Oblast
- Sumy Oblast

=== Start of World War II ===
After the Soviet invasion of Poland and the resulting annexation of its eastern half by the Soviet Union. The territorial administration was somewhat preserved converting Polish voivodeships into Soviet oblasts. Thus, six new oblasts were established in Western Ukraine on 4 December 1939:

- Volyn Oblast (with its centre in Lutsk, western part of Wolyn Voivodeship)
- Rovno Oblast (eastern part of Wolyn Voivodeship)
- Lviv Oblast (northeastern part of Lwow Voivodeship and northern part of Tarnopol Voivodeship)
- Drohobych Oblast (southeastern part of Lwow Voivodeship)
- Stanislaviv Oblast (Stanislawow Voivodeship)
- Tarnopil Oblast (southern part of Wolyn Voivodeship and most of Tarnopol Voivodeship)

In late June 1940 the Soviet Union annexed Bessarabia and Northern Bukovina from the Kingdom of Romania. On the 28th of June 1940, the Moldavian SSR, a full Union republic was formed out of most of Bessarabia and Moldavian ASSR that Ukraine gave up. In return it gained the Northern Bukovina province and the southern Budjak region from Bessarabia. The new territories were integrated into Ukraine on 7 August 1940, as respectively:

- Akkerman Oblast
- Chernivitsi Oblast

The former was renamed to Izmail Oblast on 7 December 1940, and the centre moved to Izmail. Thus, in the prelude of Soviet Union's entry to World War II, Ukraine gained eight new Oblasts, which combined with the fifteen existing previously, brought a total to twenty three.

=== German occupation ===
As the Red Army liberated Ukraine throughout 1943/1944, several changes were made, including the complete reinstatement of the pre-World War II oblasts. On 29 March 1944 the city of Chernivitsi was renamed to Chernivtsi, as was the oblast. In a similar fashion, Tarnopil became Ternopil on 15 April 1944.

The liberation left a German-occupied zone in Crimea and Taurida. To facilitate the Crimean Offensive, on 30 March 1944, a new, 24th oblast was created in Taurida:

- Kherson Oblast

=== Post World War II ===
After the war ended, the Carpathian Ruthenia province of Czechoslovakia was passed to the USSR and on 21 January 1946, the territory was annexed to Ukraine as the

- Zakarpattia Oblast

During the post-war rebuilding the administrative division remained stable. However the political aftermath following death of Stalin in 1953 brought a number of re-organisation policies into Ukraine. Already, on 7 January 1954, a new entity was created in central Ukraine via donation of bordering raions from neighbouring oblasts, called

- Cherkasy Oblast

In the prelude to the 300th anniversary of the Treaty of Pereyaslavl on 4 February, the city of Proskuriv was renamed to Khmelnytskyi, after the historic Cossack leader Bohdan Khmelnytskyi, along with the oblast. On 19 February the Izmail Oblast was disbanded and merged with the Odessa Oblast. However, arguably the most significant change in 1954 was the transfer of Crimea from the Russian SFSR, and thus Ukraine gained the

- Crimean Oblast

After the political defeat of the so-called Anti-Party Group, consisting of famous politicians such as Vyacheslav Molotov and Lazar Kaganovich, a nationwide renaming campaign was undertaken. To ensure further disturbances of such manner be avoided, in early 1958 Moscow passed a decree not to name any object or locale in honour of a living person, and on 5 March 1958, the city of Voroshylovhrad (bearing the name of its native, Kliment Voroshilov) was renamed to its historical name of Luhansk as was the oblast.

Drohobych Oblast was continuously reduced in size, ceding three raions to the Polish Committee of National Liberation in autumn 1944 (including the city of Peremyshl). Another raion (village of Medyka) followed in May 1948, and losing a further 480 km^{2} of territory in 1951 to the now People's Republic of Poland. The rural oblast also proved to be economically inefficient and was thus disbanded; its territory merged into Lviv Oblast on 21 May 1959. The latter would be the last major change of internal borders of Ukraine's administrative divisions until present day, the oblast count would stay stable at twenty five up to the republic's independence in 1991.

Minor changes would continue nonetheless. The 22nd Congress of the CPSU initiated a cosmetic phase to the De-Stalinization programme by breaking Joseph Stalin's cult of personality. On 9 November 1961, the city of Stalino was renamed to Donetsk and the oblast followed suit. Exactly a year later, the city and oblast of Stanislaviv was renamed to Ivano-Frankivsk in honour of the Ukrainian writer and poet Ivan Franko. Following the death of Kliment Voroshilov in December 1969, the city and oblast of Luhansk once again became Voroshylovhrad on 5 January 1970.

This arrangement would enter a stable phase right into perestroika. On 4 May 1990 Voroshylovhrad would be renamed to Luhansk, along with the oblast. On 11 June 1991, the city of Rovno was renamed to Rivne, the oblast too. However, the most significant change took place on June 19 1991, when the Crimean Oblast would re-establish as the Crimean Autonomous Soviet Socialist Republic, which it held as part of the Russian SFSR until 18 May 1944, and would declare sovereignty on 4 September.

The present Administrative division of Ukraine have retained the Soviet-time arrangement, though legal formalities such as the Crimea's status as an Autonomous republic and the status of Sevastopol would be settled in the mid-1990s. However, Crimea would be eventually annexed forcibly into Russia in 2014 while four Ukrainian oblasts of Kherson, Zaporizhzhia, Donetsk and Luhansk were also illegally annexed into Russia in September 2022. The pro-Russian states of Donetsk People's Republic and Luhansk People's Republics unilaterally declared independence from Ukraine in 2014.

== See also ==
- Administrative divisions of Ukraine
- Development of the administrative divisions of Ukraine
