= Counties of Poland =

Provincial unit in Poland

Map of Poland and its counties

Counties in Poland (Polish: powiat, [ˈpɔvjat]; pl. powiaty) are the second-level unit of local government and administration in Poland, equivalent to a district or prefecture (LAU-1 [formerly NUTS-4]) in other countries. The term powiat is most often translated into English as "county" or "district" (sometimes "poviat"). In historical contexts, this may be confusing because the Polish term hrabstwo (an administrative unit administered/owned by a hrabia (count) is also literally translated as "county".

A county is part of a larger unit, the voivodeship.

A county is usually subdivided into municipalities. Major towns and cities, however, function as separate counties in their own right, without subdivision into municipalities. They are termed city-counties, and have roughly the same status as former county boroughs in the United Kingdom. The other type of counties are termed land counties (powiaty ziemskie).

As of 2018, there were 380 county-level entities: 314 land counties, and 66 city counties. For a complete alphabetical listing, see List of Polish counties. For tables of counties by voivodeship, see the articles on the individual voivodeships (e.g., Greater Poland Voivodeship).

== History ==
The history of Polish counties goes back to the second half of the 14th century. They remained the basic unit of territorial organization in Poland, then in the Polish–Lithuanian Commonwealth, until the latter's partitioning in 1795.

In the 19th century, the counties continued to function in the part of Poland that had been incorporated into the Russian Empire and in the confederated "Congress Kingdom of Poland"—the equivalent of the Russian uyezd–and, in the German-governed Grand Duchy of Poznań, as the Polish equivalent of the German Kreis.

After Poland regained independence in 1918, the counties were again the second-level territorial units.

counties were abolished in 1975 in favour of a larger number of voivodeships but were reintroduced on 1 January 1999. This reform also created 16 larger voivodeships.

== Functioning ==
Legislative power within a county is vested in an elected council (rada powiatu), while local executive power is vested in an executive board (zarząd powiatu) headed by the starosta, elected by the council. The administrative offices headed by the starosta are called the starostwo. However, in city counties these institutions do not exist separately – their powers and functions are exercised by the city council (rada miasta), the directly elected mayor (burmistrz or prezydent), and the city office/town hall (urząd miasta).

Sometimes, a county has its seat outside its territory. For example, Poznań County (powiat poznański) has its offices in Poznań, although Poznań is itself a city county, and is therefore not part of Poznań County.

Counties have relatively limited powers since many local and regional matters are dealt with either at gmina or voivodeship level. Some of the main areas in which the county authorities have decision-making powers and competences include:

- education at the high-school level (the gminas run primary and middle schools)
- healthcare (at the county level)
- public transport
- maintenance of certain designated roads
- land surveying
- issuing of work permits to foreigners
- vehicle registration (see Polish car number plates).

== Names and English equivalents ==
The Polish the name of a county, in the administrative sense, consists of the word powiat followed by a masculine-gender adjective (because powiat is a masculine noun). In most cases, this is the adjective formed from the name of the town or city where the county has its seat. Thus the county with its seat at the town of Kutno is named powiat kutnowski (Kutno County). (In modern Polish both parts of the name are written in lower case; however, names of counties in the Grand Duchy of Poznań were written in upper case.) Suppose the name of the seat comprises a noun followed by an adjective, as in Maków Mazowiecki ("Mazovian Maków"). In that case, the adjective will generally be formed from the noun only (powiat makowski). There are also a few counties whose names are derived from the names of two towns (such as powiat czarnkowsko-trzcianecki, Czarnków-Trzcianka County), from the name of a city and a geographical adjective (powiat łódzki wschodni, Łódź East County), or a mountain range (powiat tatrzański, Tatra County).

There is more than one way to render such names into English. A common method is to translate the names as "(something County)", as in the examples above. (This system is the standard used in Wikipedia.) Thus in most cases, the English name for a county consists of the name of the city or town which is its seat, followed by the word County.

Different counties sometimes have the same name in Polish, since the names of different towns may have the same derived adjective. For example, the counties with their seats at Grodzisk Wielkopolski and Grodzisk Mazowiecki are both called powiat grodziski, and those with seats at Brzeg and Brzesko are both called powiat brzeski. In English, this ambiguity does not occur in some cases (Brzeg County and Brzesko County); in others, it was formerly avoided by using the complete name of the seat (e.g. Grodzisk Wielkopolski County, Grodzisk Mazowiecki County), but current usage is to also state the voivodeship (Grodzisk County, Greater Poland Voivodeship and Grodzisk County, Masovian Voivodeship).

== See also ==
- Povit, equivalent in Ukraine
