= Starosta =

Slavic title for an official or unofficial position of leadership

Starosta /ˈstɑːrɒstə/ or starost (Cyrillic: старост/а, Latin: capitaneus, German: Starost, Hauptmann) is a community elder in some Slavic lands.

The Slavic root of "starost" translates as "senior". Since the Middle Ages, it has designated an official in a leadership position in a range of civic and social contexts throughout Central and Eastern Europe. In reference to a municipality, a starosta was historically a senior royal administrative official, equivalent to a county sheriff or seneschal, and analogous to a gubernator. In Poland, a starosta administered a crown land district called starostwo.

In the early Middle Ages, a starosta could head a settled urban or rural community or other community, as in the case of a church starosta or an artel starosta. A starosta also functioned as a master of ceremonies.

== Czech Republic and Slovakia ==
In the Czech Republic and Slovakia starosta is the title of a mayor of a town or village. Mayors of major cities use the title primátor. The term corresponds to the Austrian or German Bürgermeister.

== Holy Roman Empire ==
Historically, the title "Starost" was also used in parts of the Holy Roman Empire. The German word Starostei referred to the office or crown land district of a Starost. In German, the title starost/starosta is also translated as Hauptmann and analogous to a gubernator.

== Poland ==
=== Kingdom of Poland ===
In the Kingdom of Poland and the Polish–Lithuanian Commonwealth, the Starosta was from the 15th century the office of a territorial administrator, usually conferred on a local landowner and member of the nobility, Szlachta. Until the Third Partition of Poland in 1795, there were two types of Starosta:

- Castle Starosta (formerly Castellan or capitaneus cum iurisdictione), Starosta grodowy, as a local representative of the king, would supervise fiscal and judicial administration as well as matters of crime in a district, termed powiat; and
- Land-Starosta, Starosta niegrodowy, capitaneus sine iurisdictione, as an overseer of crown land tenants and land tenure (see tenant-in-chief), had no real obligations. The absence of an Interdict against the accumulation of thus administered districts, called starostwa, resulted in some nobles becoming immensely rich and earning the sobriquet magnates.

There were also general starosts who were provincial governors. All starosts disappeared after the Kosciuszko Insurrection in 1794 and were not reinstated until after World War I when their role was altered.

=== Contemporary ===
In contemporary Poland, starosta designates a district administrator, who heads the district administration starostwo and manages a powiat district, akin to the leader of a town or rural council.

== Ukraine ==
=== Revolutionary period ===
In the Ukrainian State during 1918, gubernatorial and povitian starostas controlled who represented the central government in regions.

=== Contemporary ===
In 2014–2015, administrative and territorial reform began in Ukraine, during which adjacent territorial hromadas began to unite into larger amalgamated territorial hromadas. In order for the interests of residents of all villages, towns and cities in united territorial communities to be properly represented, the law "On Voluntary Unification of Territorial Communities" adopted on February 5, 2015, introduced the institute of starosta, who were to be elected by residents of the respective settlements and represent their interests in the executive bodies of the council of the amalgamated territorial hromada.

The mayor, in particular, is a member of the executive committee of the amalgamated territorial hromada council ex officio, he must help the residents of his settlements with the preparation of submitting documents to local self-government bodies, participate in the preparation of the amalgamated territorial hromada budget in the part that concerns his settlements, and also perform other duties specified in Regulations on the starosta, which were approved by the council of the amalgamated territorial hromada. In particular, the council of the amalgamated territorial hromada could authorize the starosta to perform notarial acts on his own, or to transfer relevant documents from residents to the executive body of the council and back.

By the decree of the Cabinet of Ministers dated July 22, 2016, the starosta was assigned to the fifth category of positions in local self-government bodies, and later by the law dated February 9, 2017 to the sixth category. This made it possible to streamline the structure and terms of payment for the newly elected starostas.

On February 9, 2017, a law was adopted that more clearly defined the status and powers of the starosta. Also, this law introduced the concept of starosta okruhs (elderships)―the territory on which the starost is elected and over which his powers extend. The starosta okruhs were to be formed by the amalgamated territorial hromada council and could consist of several settlements, in addition to the administrative center of the amalgamated territorial hromada. It was also fixed for the starostas the right to a guaranteed speech at the meetings of the amalgamated territorial hromada council and its standing commissions on issues related to their starosta okruh, as well as added control functions over the use of communal property objects and the state of improvement in their okruh.

According to the monitoring of the Ministry of Communities and Territories Development regarding the implementation of the reform of local self-government and territorial organization of power in Ukraine, as of October 1, 2023, only 7,567 starostas were approved by the local council, while 7,567 starosta okruhs were allocated as part of territorial communities throughout Ukraine.

== Other countries ==
- In Ruthenia (Kievan Rus) it was a lower government official.
- In Galicia and Bukovina under Austrian rule a starosta supervised the county administration.
- In Russia the word was used until the early 20th century to denote the elected leader of an obshchina.
- In Romania, in the Middle Ages, the word was used until the early 19th century to denote the elected leader of the merchants or craftsmen guilds.

== Contemporary religious uses ==
Starosta is an official elected position in many Orthodox Christian churches, especially in Russia, Ukraine, and other Slavic-speaking countries. Though the position varies depending on the diocese and jurisdiction, the Starosta is generally responsible for housekeeping matters within the parish, facilitating logistics for services and cross processions, maintaining the physical church building and grounds, and ordering candles and other supplies for worship.

== See also ==
- Offices in the Polish–Lithuanian Commonwealth
- Starets
