= Starosta okruh =

Fourth-level administrative divisions of Ukraine

Starosta okruh (Ukrainian: Старостинський округ, romanized: Starostyns'kyj okruh, lit. 'Elder's district') is an administrative unit in Ukraine, an optional subdivision of the hromadas.

== Description ==
A starosta okruh is a political subdivision of a hromada whose purpose is to represent the local interests of one or more settlements within the hromada. Typically, they are formed on the territory of settlements which were formerly local governments in their own right, but which were merged to create the current amalgamated hromadas. As a rule, they cannot be formed on a settlement that serves as the administrative center of a hromada.

== List of starosta okruhs ==
According to a Ministry of Communities and Territories Development report on the implementation of the reform of local self-government and territorial organization of power, as of January 1, 2025, there were 7,740 starosta okruhs allocated within territorial hromadas throughout Ukraine, although only 7,442 starostas had been approved by the local council.

Approximately 10% of starosta okruhs have a population of less than 500 people, 61% have between 500 and 1500 people, 22% have between 1500 and 3000 people, and 7% have over 3000 people.

As of January 2024, there are only rural and settlement starosta okruhs in Ukraine, but in the Lviv urban hromada, it is planned to form Vynnyky and Dubliany urban starosta okruhs, the administrative centers of which will have the status of cities.

| Region | Number of approved starostas | Number of starosta okruhs |
|---|---|---|
| Cherkasy Oblast | 364 | 354 |
| Chernihiv Oblast | 403 | 373 |
| Chernivtsi Oblast | 179 | 200 |
| Dnipropetrovsk Oblast | 243 | 257 |
| Donetsk Oblast | 141 | 156 |
| Ivano-Frankivsk Oblast | 384 | 420 |
| Kharkiv Oblast | 344 | 348 |
| Kherson Oblast | 161 | 226 |
| Khmelnytskyi Oblast | 453 | 466 |
| Kirovohrad Oblast | 268 | 260 |
| Kyiv Oblast | 454 | 457 |
| Luhansk Oblast | 111 | 132 |
| Lviv Oblast | 504 | 460 |
| Mykolaiv Oblast | 206 | 237 |
| Odesa Oblast | 346 | 358 |
| Poltava Oblast | 290 | 325 |
| Rivne Oblast | 216 | 235 |
| Sumy Oblast | 277 | 289 |
| Ternopil Oblast | 436 | 450 |
| Vinnytsia Oblast | 486 | 505 |
| Volyn Oblast | 282 | 296 |
| Zakarpattia Oblast | 250 | 262 |
| Zaporizhzhia Oblast | 200 | 216 |
| Zhytomyr Oblast | 444 | 458 |
| Ukraine | 7442 | 7740 |

== History ==
In 2014–2015, administrative and territorial reform began in Ukraine, during which adjacent territorial hromadas began to unite into larger amalgamated territorial hromada. In order for the interests of residents of all villages, towns and cities in united territorial hromadas to be properly represented, the law "On Voluntary Unification of Territorial Hromadas" adopted on February 5, 2015, introduced the institute of starosta, who were to be elected by residents of the respective settlements and represent their interests in the executive bodies of the council of the amalgamated territorial hromada.

The mayor, in particular, is a member of the executive committee of the amalgamated territorial hromada council ex officio, he must help the residents of his settlements with the preparation of submitting documents to local self-government bodies, participate in the preparation of the amalgamated territorial hromada budget in the part that concerns his settlements, and also perform other duties specified in Regulations on the starosta, which were approved by the council of the amalgamated territorial hromada. In particular, the council of the amalgamated territorial hromada could authorize the starosta to perform notarial acts on his own, or to transfer relevant documents from residents to the executive body of the council and back.

By the decree of the Cabinet of Ministers dated July 22, 2016, the starosta was assigned to the fifth category of positions in local self-government bodies, and later by the law dated February 9, 2017 to the sixth category. This made it possible to streamline the structure and terms of payment for the newly elected starostas.

On February 9, 2017, a law was adopted that more clearly defined the status and powers of the starosta. Also, this law introduced the concept of starosta okruhs (elderships) ― the territory on which the starost is elected and over which his powers extend. The starosta okruhs were to be formed by the amalgamated territorial hromada council and could consist of several settlements, in addition to the administrative center of the amalgamated territorial hromada. It was also fixed for the starostas the right to a guaranteed speech at the meetings of the amalgamated territorial hromada council and its standing commissions on issues related to their starosta okruh, as well as added control functions over the use of communal property objects and the state of improvement in their okruh.

== See also ==
- Dzielnica, Osiedle, Sołectwo – similar divisions in Poland
- Eldership – similar division in Lithuania
- Civil parish – similar division in Great Britain and Ireland
- Frazione – similar division in Italy
- Freguesia – similar division in Portugal
