= Administrative divisions of Ukraine (1918–1925) =

Governorates of Ukraine
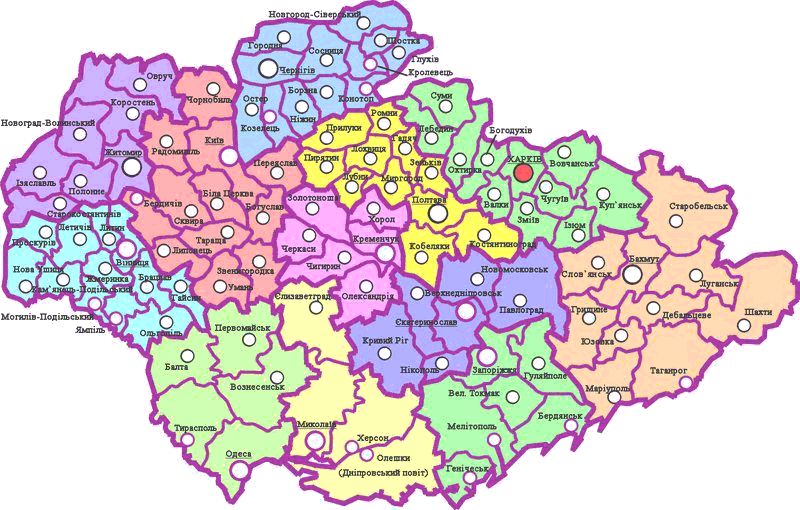
- Governorates and counties in 1921.
- Category: Subdivision of a unitary state
- Location: Ukrainian People's Republic; Ukrainian State; Ukrainian SSR
- Created: 1918–1925
- Number: 12 (7 initially) (as of 1925)
- Subdivisions: Povits (counties)

The administrative division of Ukraine in 1918 was inherited from the Russian Empire, and based on the largest unit of the gubernia (also called a province, government, or governorate; Ukrainian huberniia) with smaller subdivisions county or district (povit), and rural district (volost).

New administrative reform was adopted by the Central Council of Ukraine on March 4, 1918, which saw restructuring the subdivision of Ukraine based on a new system of the land (zemlia) and abolishing the system of governorates and povits. Implementation of the new system was never fully realized and was abandoned after Skoropadsky's coup-d'etat on April 29, 1918.

The system of governorates was abolished by the government of the Soviet Union in 1925, and replaced with the region (okruha) and district (raion).

== Regions ==
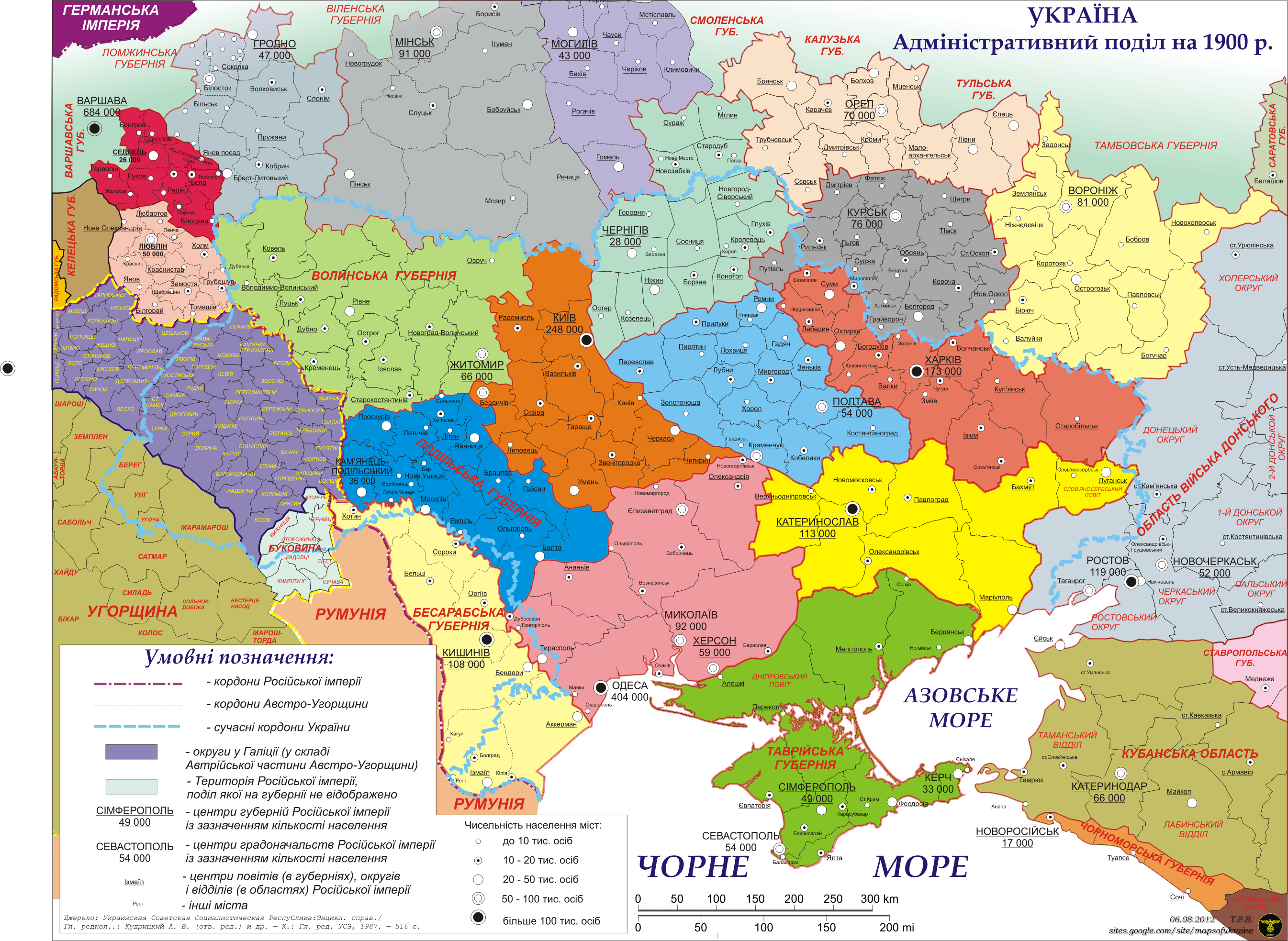
Ukraine's modern border superimposed on the administrative division of 1900 for both the Russian and the Austro-Hungarian Empires.

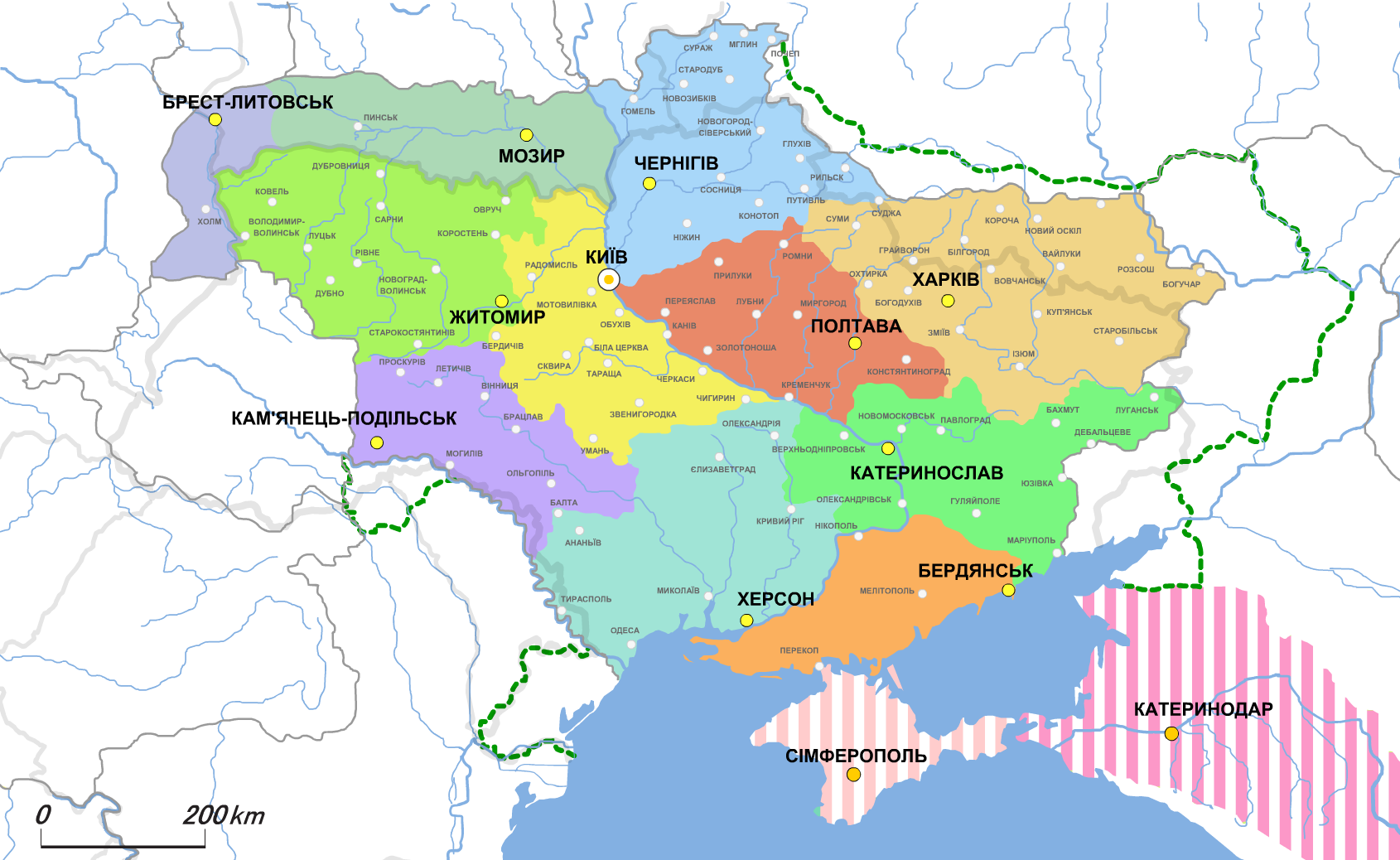
The Skoropadsky administration restored the Russian governorate system of administration.

Ukraine was divided into nine governorates, two okruhas and three cities with special status.

=== Governorates ===
- Chernihiv Governorate
- Katerynoslav Governorate
- Kiev Governorate
- Kharkiv Governorate
- Kherson Governorate
- Podolia Governorate
- Poltava Governorate
- Volhynia Governorate

Kholm Governorate was reestablished November 1918 (previously part of the Volhynia governorate), but it was never fully realized. In 1919 it was fully occupied by the Polish Army and in 1920 transferred to the Second Polish Republic after the Warsaw Treaty. In January 1919 the West Ukrainian People's Republic joined the Ukrainian People's Republic as its Western Oblast by the Unification Act, while de facto being almost completely occupied by Poland.

Chernihiv Governorate also included Homiel county that was ceded from the Mahilou Governorate. Some parts of Kursk Governorate were ceded to Chernihiv and Kharkiv governorates. Kharkiv governorate also received some counties of Voronezh governorate.

With reestablishment of the Soviet regime some transformations took place. The following were created:

- Kremenchuk Governorate
- Donets Governorate
- Odesa Governorate
- Zaporizhia Governorate

Kherson Governorate was renamed Mykolaiv Governorate in 1921, and later merged into Odesa Governorate.

Volhynia Governorate was lost to Poland after the Peace of Riga. The Moldavian Autonomous Soviet Socialist Republic was created from parts of Odesa Governorate.

=== Okruhas ===
- Polissia Okruha
- Tavria Okruha

Tavria (Taurida) Okruha was created after the liberation of Ukraine from Soviet occupation in 1918 when the Crimean peninsula was administered by the Crimean Regional Government, while the continental part of the Taurida Governorate became the Taurida Okruha.

Polissia Okruha was created in August 1918 from the southern counties of the Minsk Governorate.

Both okruhas were liquidated after the 1920 invasion of Soviet forces.

More systematic division of okruhas was created in Soviet Ukraine in 1923 when okruhas were at first a subdivision of governorates, then and after the 1925 liquidation of governorates okruhas became the main subdivision of the republic until 1930.

=== Cities ===
- Kyiv
- Odesa
- Mykolaiv

== See also ==
- Administrative division of Ukraine (1918)
- Administrative divisions of Ukraine (1925–1932)
- Administrative divisions of the Ukrainian SSR
- Development of the administrative divisions of Ukraine
