= Administrative division of Ukraine (1918) =

Regions of the Ukrainian People's Republic
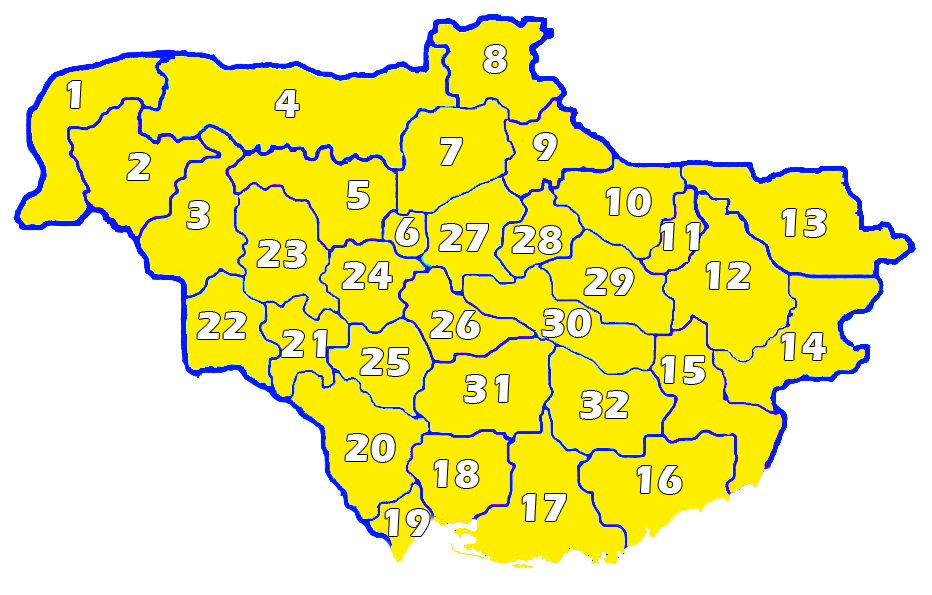
- Zemlias in 1918
- Category: Subdivision of a unitary state
- Location: Ukrainian People's Republic
- Created: 1918
- Number: 32 (as of 1918)
- Populations: ~1 million
- Subdivisions: Volosts

The system of administrative division of Ukraine in 1918 was inherited from the Russian Empire, and was based on the governorate division (also called province or government; Ukrainian: губернія, romanized: huberniia) with the smaller subdivisions district (povit) and rural district (volost). A new administrative reform was adopted by the Central Council of Ukraine on March 6, 1918 which saw restructuring the subdivision of Ukraine based on a new system of regions (zemlias) and abolishing the system of governorates and povits. The zemlias were divided into volosts, which were further divided into hromadas. Implementation of the new system was never fully realized and after the Skoropadsky's coup-d'état on April 29, 1918 was abandoned.

== Regions ==
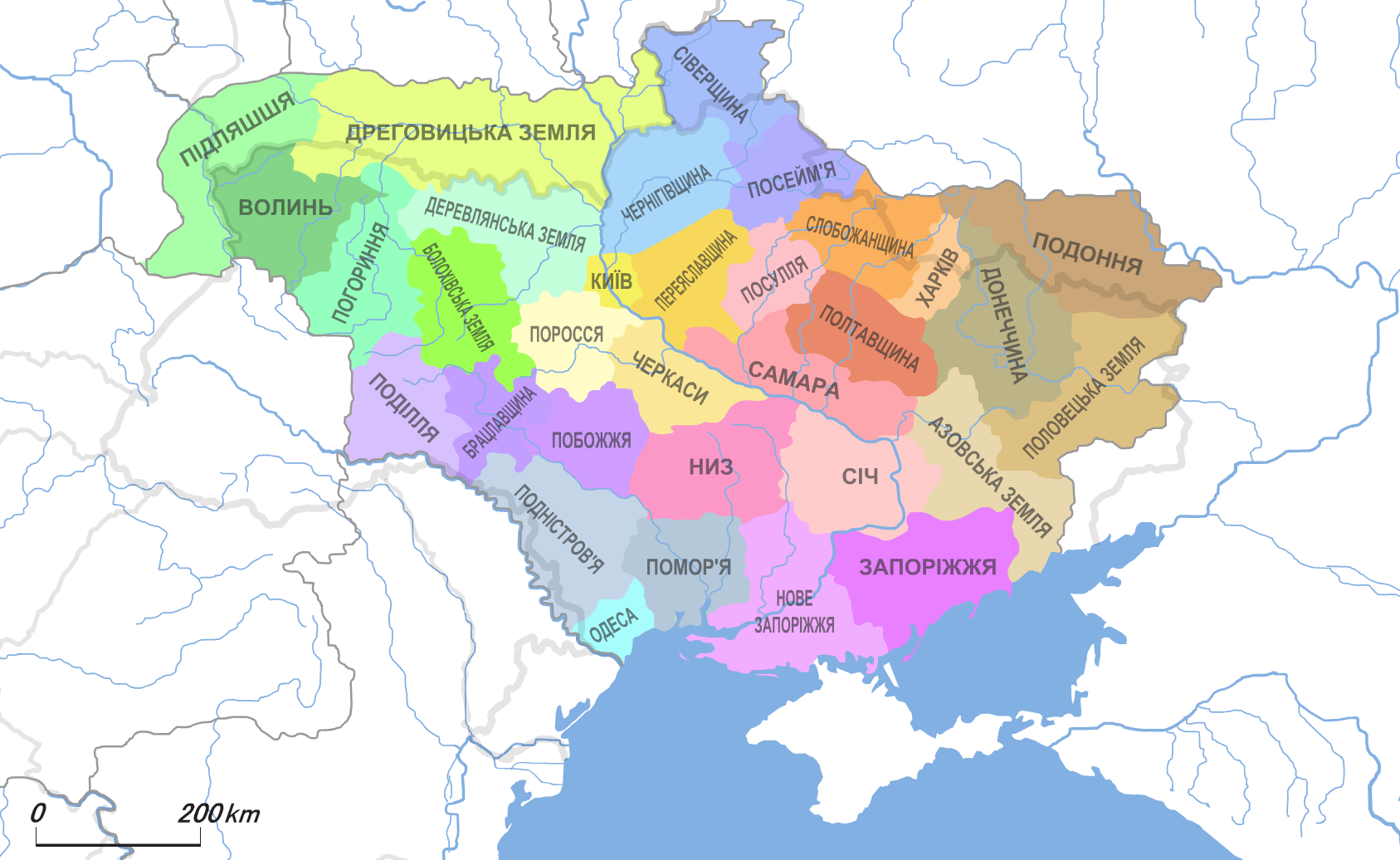
Zemlias in 1918 (superimposed on modern borders)

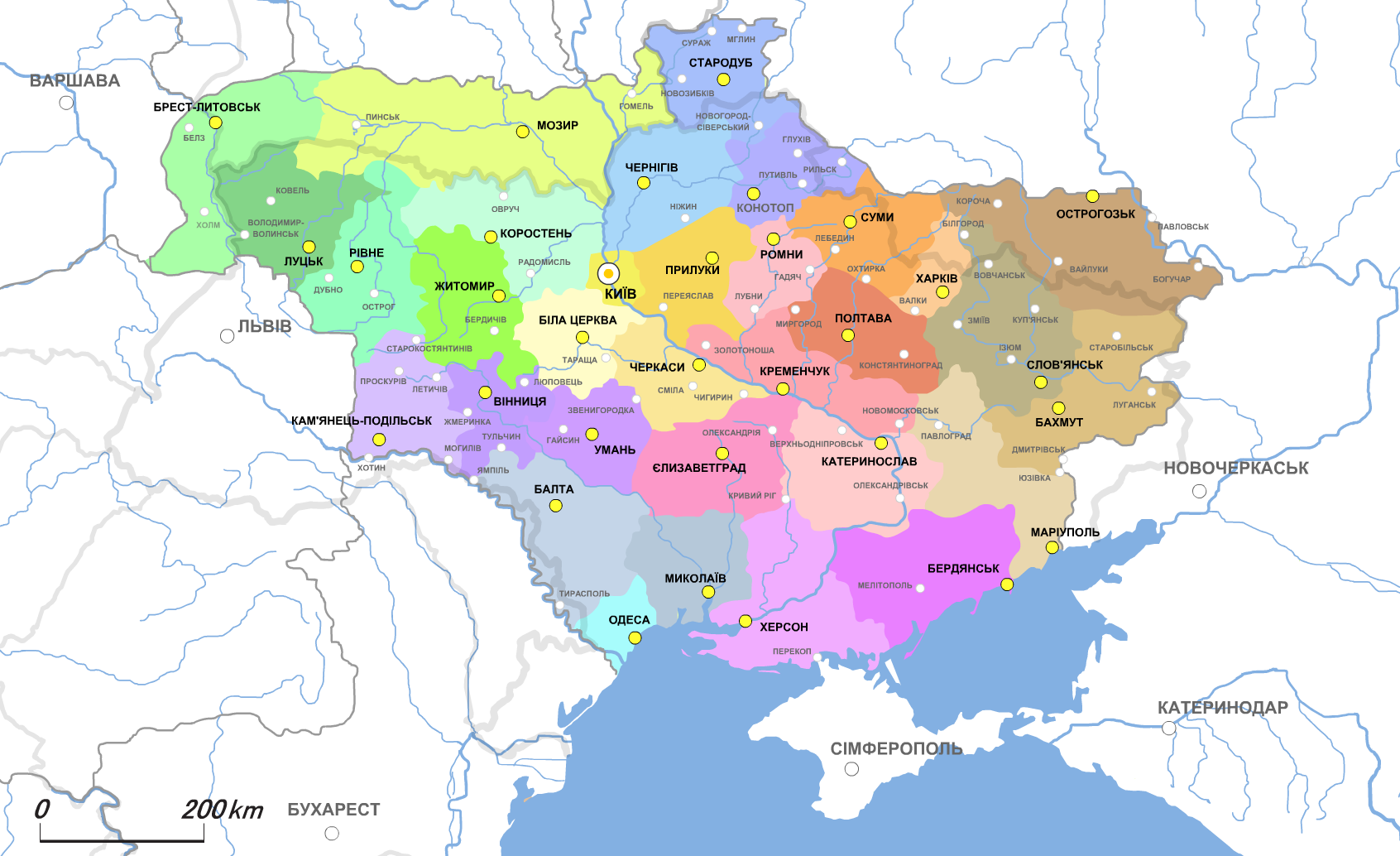
Zemlias and their cities in 1918 (superimposed on modern borders)

Ukraine was divided into 32 regions (Ukrainian: землі, romanized: zemli) with three cities that had status of a region (Kyiv, Kharkiv and Odesa).

=== List of regions ===
The following table shows the list of lands in accordance with the adopted law and the description of their territories in accordance with the previous project proposed by Mykhailo Hrushevskyi in a publication dated December 1917.

Location	No.	Name	Centre	Territory according to the project of Hrushevskyi
	1	Pidliashshia	Berestia	Was not considered
	2	Volhynia	Lutsk	Volodymyr, Lutsk, Kovel povit and parts of Dubno povit
	3	Pohorynnia	Rivne	Rivne, Ostroh, Zaslav, Kremenets povits, southern part of Dubno povit and western part of Starokostiantyniv povit
	4	Bolokhiv	Zhytomyr	Zhytomyr, Novohrad-Volynskyi povits and parts of Berdychiv, Lityn, and Vinnytsia povits
	5	Derevlianshchyna	Iskorosten	Radomyshl and Ovruch povits, Kyiv povit without southern part and northern part of Rivne povit
	6	Drehovychchyna	Mozyr	Was not considered
	7	Kyiv		Kyiv with outskirts, to Irpin and Stuhna as well as 20 verst beyond Dnieper
	8	Porossia	Bila Tserkva	Vasylkiv, Skvyra, Tarashcha povits, southern part of Kyiv povit and eastern part of Berdychiv povit
	9	Cherkashchyna	Cherkasy	Cherkasy, Kaniv, Chyhyryn povits and parts of Zvenyhorod povit
	10	Pobozhzhia	Uman	Uman, Haisyn, and parts of Lypovets, Balta, Yelysavethrad povits
	11	Podillia	Kamianets-Podilskyi	Kamianets, Proskuriv, Ushytsia povits and parts of Mohyliv and Starokostyantyniv povits
	12	Bratslavshchyna	Vinnytsia	Vinnytsia, Bratslav povits and parts of Lityn, Lypovets, Mohyliv, and Yampil povits
	13	Podnistrovia	Mohyliv-Podilskyi	Olhopil, Tyraspil povits and parts of Yampil, Balta, and Ananiiv povits
	14	Pomoria	Mykolaiv	Odesa povit and parts of Ananiiv, Yelysavethrad, and Kherson povits
	15	Odesa		Odesa with outskirts, with territory up to the Dniester Estuary
	16	Nyz	Yelysavethrad	Parts of Yelysavethrad, Oleksandriia, Verkhniodniprovsk povits
	17	Sich	Katerynoslav	Katerynoslav povit, and parts of Verkhniodniprovsk, Kherson, Novomoskovsk, and Oleksandriia povits
	18	Zaporizhzhia	Berdiansk	Melitopol and Berdiansk povits
	19	Nove Zaporizhzhia	Kherson	Dnipro povit and parts of Kherson povit
	20	Azov	Mariupol	Mariupol, Pavlohrad povits and parts of Oleksandrivsk povits
	21	Sivershchyna	Starodub	Mhlyn, Surazh, Novozybkiv, Starodub and Novhorod-Siverskyi povits
	22	Chernihivshchyna	Chernihiv	Chernihiv, Horodnia, Oster, Sosnytsia povits and parts of Kozelets, Nizhyn, and Borzna povits
	23	Pereiaslavshchyna	Pryluky	Pereiaslav, Pryluky, Pyriatyn povits, and parts of Kozelets, Nizhyn, Borzna, and Zolotonosha povits
	24	Poseimia	Konotop	Krolevets, Konotop, Hlukhiv, and Putyvl povits
	25	Posullia	Romny	Romny, Lokhvytsia, Hadiach povits, and parts of Lubny and Myrhorod povits
	26	Samara	Kremenchuk	Kremenchuk, Kobeliaky povits, and parts of Zolotonosha, Khorol, Novomoskovsk povits
	27	Poltavshchyna	Poltava	Poltava, Zinkiv, Kostiantyniv povits, and parts of Myrhorod, Khorol, Valky, Okhtyrka, and Bohodukhiv povits
	28	Slobozhanshchyna	Sumy	Sumy, Lebedyn, Sudzha, Hraivoron povits, and parts of Okhtyrka and Bohodukhiv povits
	29	Kharkiv		Kharkiv with its povit and parts of Valky and Bilhorod povits
	30	Donechchyna	Sloviansk	Zmiiv, Izium, Vovchansk, Kupiansk povits and parts of Koroch
	31	Podonnia	Ostrohozk	Novyi Oskil, Biriuchansk, Ostrohozk, Bohuchar povits and parts of Korocha and Starobilsk povits
	32	Polovechchyna	Bakhmut	Starobilsk, Slovianoserbsk, and Bakhmut povits

== History ==
=== Project of Hrushevskyi ===
In December 1917, Mykhailo Hrushevskyi appeared in the Ukrainian newspaper Narodna Volia with the article The New Division of Ukraine, in which he described the principles of the new division of Ukraine, which were to be approved by the future Ukrainian Constituent Assembly in the new constitution of the Ukrainian People's Republic: instead of the then division into governorates and povits a division into zemlias larger than povits, but smaller than governorates was proposed. These zemlias should serve as constituencies for the Ukrainian National Assembly, the basis for building an administrative and judicial network and for the development of public self-government on the basis of decentralization.

On the advice of specialists, Hrushevskyi allocated zemlias based on the principle that a little more than a million people lived in each. Such a population would be sufficient for the independent establishment of sanitary, road, land, industrial and cultural affairs, as well as for the organization of a sufficient network of secondary education. Each land would have to send at least 10 deputies to the national assembly, which would ensure the possibility of party grouping and proportional elections.

In total, Hrushevsky proposed a detailed division into 30 lands only in the territory of Ukraine where the elections to the constituent assembly were to be held; the question of annexation or withdrawal of other adjacent territories should be decided later by a free expression of the will of the people. Therefore, in particular, he did not include Kholm region, Khotyn region, Galicia, Prykarpattia, Bukovyna and Eastern Bessarabia.

=== Enactment ===
On March 6, 1918, the Little Rada of the Central Rada adopted the "Law on the Division of Ukraine into Zemlias", according to which the division of Ukraine into governorates and povits was abolished, and the territory of the Ukrainian People's Republic was divided into 32 zemlias. At the same time, only the administrative centers of the lands were defined in the law, and the exact delimitation of the lands was planned to be carried out later. It was also indicated that in the case of separation of the Ukrainian People's Republic from neighboring states, the amount of zemlias may be changed. The law was promulgated in the Bulletin of the Council of People's Ministers of the Ukrainian People's Republic on March 15, 1918.

The organization of local authorities had to meet the new conditions, but the Central Rada did not have time to do so. As part of the administrative reform that the government was preparing in the spring of 1918, the abolition of zemlia committees began, and the reorganization of zemlia committees was planned. During the time of the Central Rada, the government did not manage to create an effective system of local authorities and branch administration, which led to the loss of political and economic control over the provincial areas, without which the state administration system turned out to be ineffective. The weakness of one of the main structural links of the executive vertical — the system of local bodies — was considered one of the reasons for the fall of the Central Rada.

The adopted law also announced the inclusion of the Podonnia zemlia with the centre in Ostrohozk into the UPR, which included the Ukrainian ethnic povits of the Voronezh and Kursk governorates, and the Bilhorod povit was divided between Kharkiv and Donechchyna of the UPR. However, the corresponding declaration was never transformed into their real inclusion in Ukraine, which became possible only during the time of the Hetmanate of Pavlo Skoropadskyi.

On April 29, 1918, the Central Council adopted the Constitution of the Ukrainian People's Republic, which granted zemlias, volosts and hromadas the rights of broad local self-government based on the principles of decentralization.

After coming to power on April 30, 1918, Hetman Pavlo Skoropadskyi canceled the previous administrative-territorial division and returned to the Russian scheme (governorates, povits and volosts).

== See also ==
- Development of the administrative divisions of Ukraine
- Administrative divisions of Ukraine (1918–1925)
- Administrative divisions of Ukraine (1925–1932)
