= Powiat brzeski =

Powiat brzeski may refer to either of two counties (powiats) in Poland:

- Brzeg County, in Opole Voivodeship (south-west Poland)
- Brzesko County, in Lesser Poland Voivodeship (south Poland)
