= Powiat grodziski =

Powiat grodziski may refer to either of two counties (powiats) in Poland:

- Grodzisk County, Greater Poland Voivodeship (west-central Poland)
- Grodzisk County, Masovian Voivodeship (east-central Poland)
