= Hromada =

Third-level administrative divisions of Ukraine

Territorial hromadas of Ukraine
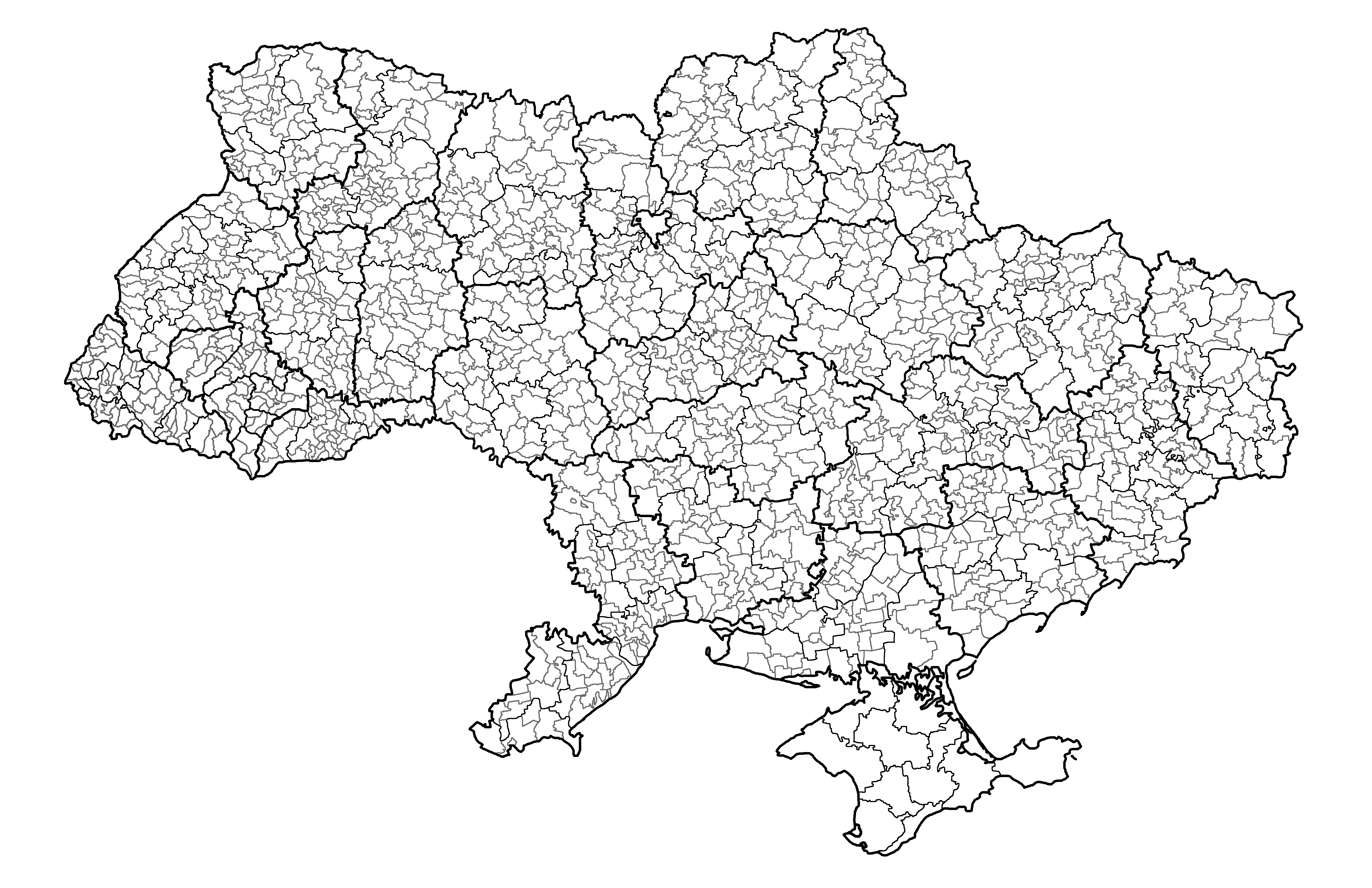
- Hromadas of Ukraine as of 2020 (raions in Crimea)
- Category: Third-level subdivision
- Location: Ukraine
- Found in: Raions
- Created: 12 June 2020
- Number: 1469 (as of 2023)
- Subdivisions: Starosta okruhs

Territorial hromada (територіальна громада [ɦrɔˈmɑdɐ]; lit. 'territorial community') is the main type of municipality and the third level local self-government in Ukraine. The current hromadas were established by the government of Ukraine on 12 June 2020.

A municipality is designated urban hromada if its administration is located in a city; settlement hromada if it is located in a settlement (selyshche), and rural hromada if it is located in a village (selo) or a settlement. Hromadas are grouped to form raions (districts); groups of raions form oblasts (provinces). Optionally, a municipality may be divided into starosta okruhs (similar to civil parishes in Great Britain or frazioni in Italy), which are the lowest level of local government in Ukraine.

Similar terms exist in Poland (gromada) and in Belarus (hramada). The literal translation of this term is "community", similar to the terms used in western European states, such as Germany (Gemeinde), France (commune), Italy (comune), and Portugal (freguesia), or in several English-speaking countries (township).

== List of hromadas ==
In total, there are 1469 hromadas (as of 1 October 2023), including:

- 409 urban hromadas (Ukrainian: міська громада),
- 435 settlement hromadas (Ukrainian: селищна громада),
- 625 rural hromadas (Ukrainian: сільська громада).

Region	Number of hromadas			
Region	Hromada type			Total
Region	urban	settlement	rural	Total
Zakarpattia Oblast	11	18	35	64
Cherkasy Oblast	16	10	40	66
Chernivtsi Oblast	11	7	34	52
Chernihiv Oblast	16	24	17	57
Donetsk Oblast	43	14	9	66
Dnipropetrovsk Oblast	20	25	41	86
Kharkiv Oblast	17	26	13	56
Kherson Oblast	9	17	23	49
Khmelnytskyi Oblast	13	22	25	60
Ivano-Frankivsk Oblast	15	23	24	62
Kyiv Oblast	24	23	22	69
Kirovohrad Oblast	12	16	21	49
Luhansk Oblast	20	12	5	37
Lviv Oblast	39	16	18	73
Mykolaiv Oblast	9	14	29	52
Odesa Oblast	19	25	47	91
Poltava Oblast	16	20	24	60
Rivne Oblast	11	13	40	64
Sumy Oblast	15	15	21	51
Ternopil Oblast	18	16	21	55
Vinnytsia Oblast	18	22	23	63
Volyn Oblast	11	18	25	54
Zaporizhzhia Oblast	14	17	36	67
Zhytomyr Oblast	12	22	32	66
Ukraine	409	435	625	1469

== History ==
=== Medieval era ===
During the period of Kyivan Rus, the basic unit of administrative division was known as verv, with several such communities forming a volost. Other concurrent units of administrative division were desiatka ("ten"), sotnia ("hundred") and tysiacha ("thousand").

During the 14-15th centuries, the populations of Galicia and the Grand Duchy of Lithuania were divided into self-governed volost communities (hromadas) according to the norms of Ruthenian Law. Heads of all households would take part in communal gatherings, known as veche, electing their head (starosta). The veche also known as kopa, also served as a judicial organ and fulfilled policing functions. Members of a community bore collective responsibility for the gathering of taxes and delivering criminals from among their rows.

=== Polish-Lithuanian and Russian rule ===
The establishment of the Polish-Lithuanian Commonwealth was accompanied with mass introduction of German Law, which led to the decline of traditional self-government in Ukrainian lands. Communal gatherings lost their power in favour of the viyt, who was appointed by local landlords. Under the pressure of the gentry, during the 16th century, bigger communities were divided into smaller ones. Another type of hromadas which existed in the Carpathians was based on the so-called Wallachian Law, and encompassed members of herding communities, who possessed their own self-government and elected a leader ("kniez").

During the 17th century, self-governed communities continued to exist in Left-bank Ukraine, where they were divided into Cossack, peasant and mixed hromadas. Cossack and mixed hromadas elected an otaman, meanwhile members of peasant hromadas were headed by a viyt or starosta. The former would be responsible for calling up community gatherings in order to decide on the matters of local government, justice and use of communal land. By the 18th century communal land ownership in Ukrainian lands had declined, however it saw a revival following the Emancipation reform of 1861, during which land was transferred not to separate peasants, but to communities. During that period communal ownership of land was most widespread in the Left-bank and Southern Ukraine.

=== 19th century ===
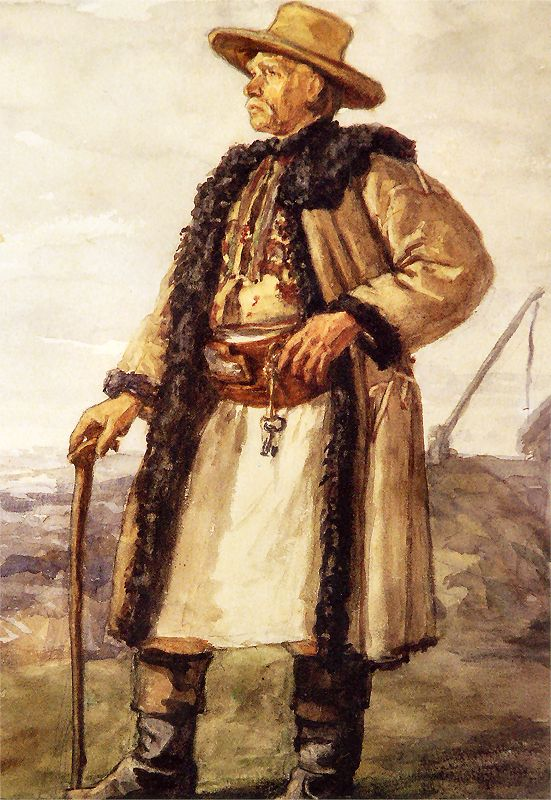
Portrait of a viyt from Galicia, 1867

Until 1861, only state serfs were members of communities, but in the aftermath emancipated peasants were also given limited self-government. After the Emancipation reform, peasant communities were tasked with redistribution of land between their members and bore collective responsibility for taxation and redemption payments. The chief organ of a peasant community was the skhod ("gathering"), which involved village officials and adult men heading peasant families of the village, with 2 men representing 10 households. The gathering would elect the starosta along with other officials, establish local taxes and discuss other communal issues. Self-government of local communities was limited and remained under supervision of volost organs and administration.

In the Austrian Empire peasant communities had a greater degree of self-government than in Russian-ruled areas of Ukraine. Along with its normal functions, a community could also fulfill tasks, entrusted by the administration. In Austrian lands the hromada was represented by its council (rada) and viyt. Electoral rights in the community belonged exclusively to adult male taxpayers, as well as representatives of certain professions and occupations. In Galicia under Austrian rule Ukrainian language was used in communal government.

=== 20th century ===
The role of peasant communes suffered a new decline as a result of Stolypin reform, during which peasants in Ukrainian lands of the Russian Empire were especially active in adopting private land ownership.

The period of the Ukrainian People's Republic saw the democratization of local government, but it turned out to be short-lived due to the establishment of Soviet and Polish rule.

In Poland until 1933 local government was executed mostly by government-appointed commissars. According to a law adopted in 1933, hromadas under Polish rule were subjected to gminas, with head of the hromada (soltys) being elected by all of its members over 24 years of age. The head of hromada had to be confirmed by the state administration, but in many communities direct appointment by the government administration continued to be practiced. In Transcarpathia, self-governed hromadas would be headed by starostas and administratively united into notariates.

In the USSR, the soviet system was introduced in local councils, represented by city and village councils.

=== Contemporary Ukraine ===
Prior to 2020, the basic units of administrative division in Ukraine were rural councils, settlement councils and city councils, which were often referred to by the generic term hromada.

The concept of modern hromadas was developed as part of the decentralization reform initiated in the mid-2010s. In June 2014, President Petro Poroshenko proposed constitutional amendments to reorganize the administrative divisions of Ukraine into oblasts, raions and hromadas.

On 5 February 2015, the Ukrainian parliament adopted the law "On voluntary association of territorial communities", which enabled the creation of amalgamated hromadas (Ukrainian: об'єднана територіальна громада). These were formed through the voluntary merger of existing local councils (rural, settlement, and cities of district significance) into larger administrative units intended to improve governance capacity and financial sustainability.

Amalgamated hromadas became the key instrument of decentralization reform. They were granted expanded powers and resources, taking over many responsibilities previously held by raions, including education, healthcare, cultural services, and social welfare. They also gained increased fiscal autonomy, collecting and managing local taxes more effectively than the former fragmented system.

The formation of amalgamated hromadas progressed rapidly between 2015 and 2020, primarily on a voluntary basis. New local elections were held in these units as they were established. By March 2020, 1,045 amalgamated hromadas had been created, with plans to complete nationwide coverage.

On 12 June 2020, the Cabinet of Ministers of Ukraine approved a comprehensive reform of the administrative-territorial structure at the basic level. This reform established a unified system of hromadas covering the entire territory of Ukraine (except Crimea). All previously existing amalgamated hromadas, along with older local councils, were incorporated into the new system of hromadas (territorial communities).

Initially, 1,470 hromadas were approved. On 12 August 2020, the Sokoliv hromada of Cherkasy Oblast was merged into the Zhashkiv hromada, bringing the total number to 1,469.

The Constitution of Ukraine and the law "On local self-governance" define the rights and responsibilities of hromadas as the primary units of local self-government in Ukraine.

== Administrative tasks and objectives ==
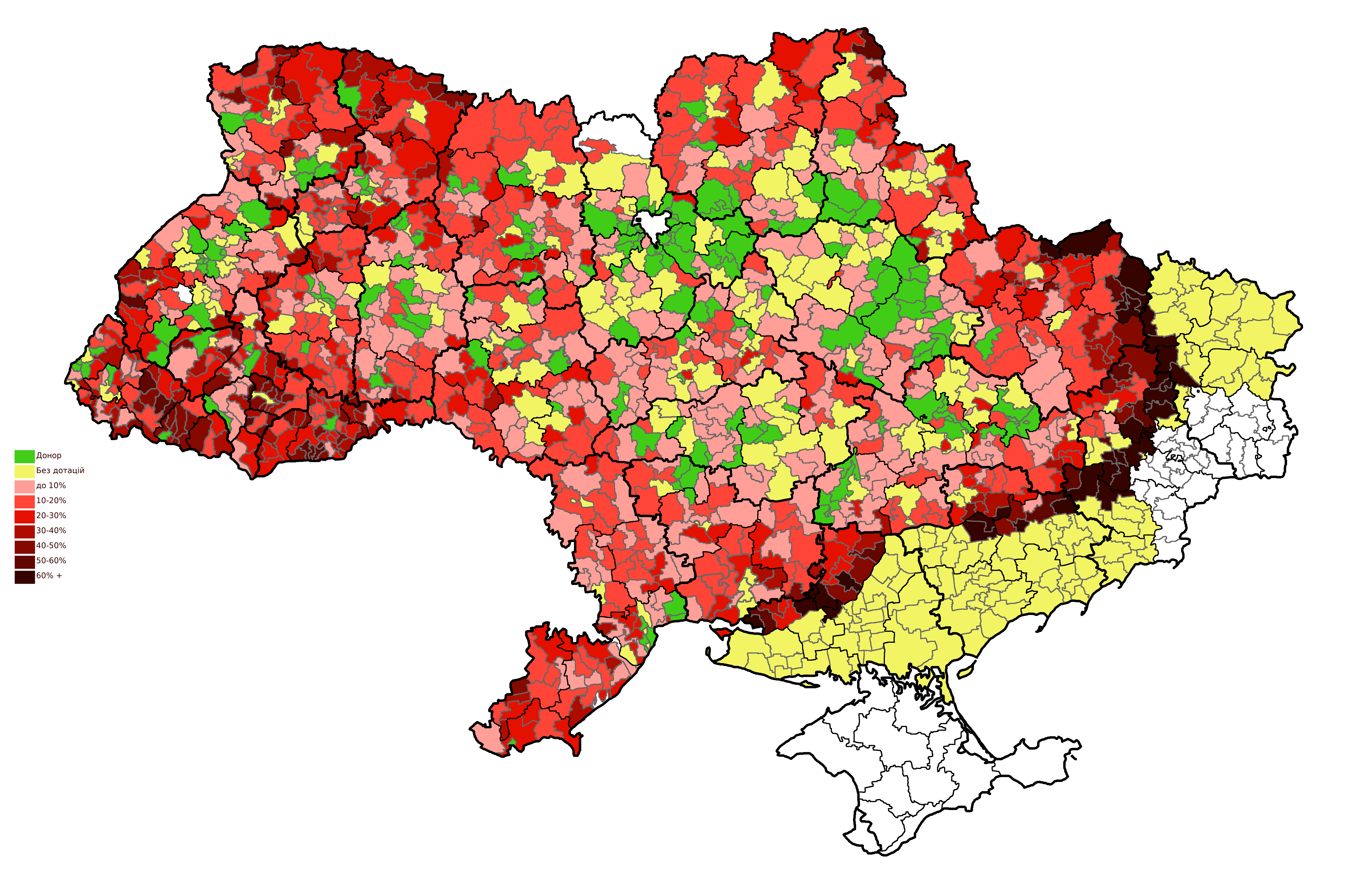
Map of financial self-sufficiency of Ukraine's hromadas in the 4th quarter of 2025: hromadas serving as donors for the central budget are marked in green; hromadas receiving subsidies are marked in shades of red, depending on the percentage of their budgets covered by central authorities; hromadas which are neither donors nor recipients of subsidies are marked in yellow; the latter category includes hromadas located in Russian-occupied territories of Ukraine.

Each hromada carries out two types of task: own and commissioned. Own tasks are public tasks exercised by self-government, which serve to satisfy the needs of the community. The tasks can be twofold:

- compulsory – where the municipality cannot decline to carry out the tasks, and must set up a budget to carry them out in order to provide the inhabitants with the basic public benefits.
- optional – where the municipality can carry them out in accordance with available budgetary means, set out only to specific local needs (on the hromada's own responsibility and budget).

=== Own objectives ===
Own high objectives include matters such as spatial harmony, real estate management, environmental protection and nature conservation, water management, country roads, public streets, bridges, squares and traffic systems, water supply systems and source, the sewage system, removal of urban waste, water treatment, maintenance of cleanliness and order, sanitary facilities, dumps and council waste, supply of electric and thermal energy and gas, public transport, health care, welfare, care homes, subsidised housing, public education, cultural facilities including public libraries and other cultural institutions, historic monuments conservation and protection, the sports facilities and tourism including recreational grounds and devices, marketplaces and covered markets, green spaces and public parks, communal graveyards, public order and safety, fire and flood protection with equipment maintenance and storage, maintaining objects and devices of the public utility and administrative buildings, pro-family policy including social support for pregnant women, medical and legal care, supporting and popularising the self-government initiatives and cooperation within the commune including with non-governmental organizations, interaction with regional communities from other countries, etc.

=== Commissioned tasks ===
Commissioned tasks cover the remaining public tasks resulting from legitimate needs of the state, commissioned by central government for the units of local government to implement. The tasks are handed over on the basis of statutory by-laws, charters and regulations, or by way of agreements between the self-government units and central-government administration.

== See also ==
- Administrative divisions of Ukraine
- Local government in Ukraine
- Gromada
