= Drohobych Oblast =

Ukrainian Oblast

Drohobych Oblast Дрогобицька область
- Oblast of the Ukrainian SSR
- 1939–1959
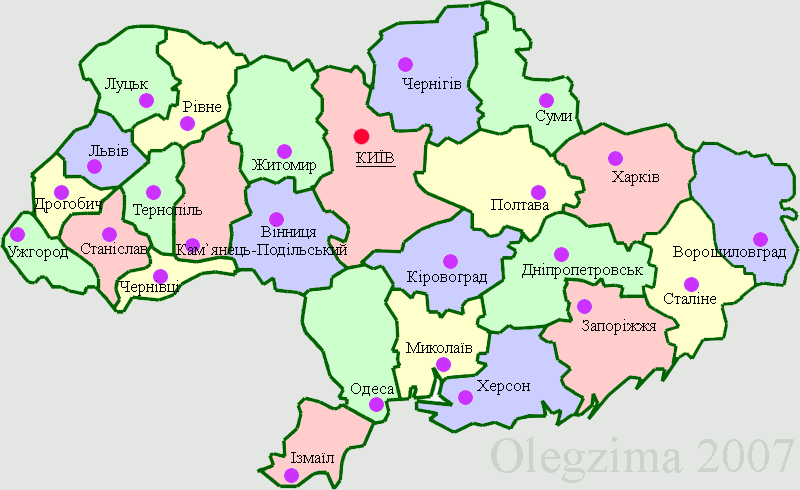
- Drohobych Oblast is marked by its capital Дрогобич (Drohobych; far west).
- Capital: Drohobych
- Area
  - Coordinates: 49°21′N 23°30′E
  - 1956: 9,600 km^{2} (3,700 sq mi)
- Population
  - 1956: 853,000
- History
  - Established: 4 December 1939
  - Merged into Lviv Oblast: 21 May 1959
Preceded by	Succeeded by
Lwów Voivodeship	Lviv Oblast

Drohobych Oblast (Ukrainian: Дрогобицька область, romanized: Drohobytska oblast) was an oblast of the Ukrainian SSR from December 4, 1939 to May 21, 1959. It had an area of 9,600 square kilometres (3,700 sq mi) and, as of 1956, had a population of 853,000.

== History ==
Drohobych Oblast was one of six oblasts (the other five are Lviv Oblast, Rivne Oblast, Stanislav (Ivano-Frankivsk) Oblast, Tarnopil (Ternopil) Oblast, and Volyn Oblast) established on the territory of West Ukraine following the 1939 invasion of Poland.

On November 27, 1939 eight powiats of Lwow voivodeship and two powiats of Stanislawow voivodeship were designated for the creation of Drohobych Oblast, establishment of which was confirmed on December 4, 1939.

- Dobromyl
- Drohobych
- Lesko
- Mostyska
- Peremyshl
- Rudky
- Sambir
- Zhydachiv
- Stryi
- Turka

On January 17, 1940 the oblast was split into 30 raions and five municipalities: Bircha (village), Boryslav (city), Vysotsko-Vyzhnie (village), Dobromyl (city), Drohobych (city), Dubliany (village), Zhydachiv (city), Zhuravno (village), Komarno (city), Krukenych (village), Lavochne (village), Lysko (city), Medenytsia (town), Medyka (village), Mostyska (city), Mykolaiv (city), Streliski Novi (town), Peremyshl (city), Pidbuzh (village), Rudky (city), Sambir (city), Skole (city), Staryi Sambir (city), Strilky (village), Stryi (city), Sudova Vyshnia (city), Turka (city), Ustryki Dolni (town), Khodoriv (city), Khyriv (city). Municipalities were Boryslav, Drohobych, Peremyshl, Sambir, Stryi. On August 15, 1940 Boryslav Raion was disestablished. On November 11, 1940, couple of raions were re-designated: Vysotsko-Vyzhnie to Borynia (village) and Lavochne-Slavsko (village).

After the oblast was retaken from German occupation on August 15, 1944, three raions were renamed: Zhydechuv to Zhydachiv, Streliski Novi to Novi Strelyshcha, and Ustryki Dolni to Nyzhnio Ustryki. In March 1945, Bircha Raion, Lisko Raion, and most of Peremyshl Raion (including the city of Przemyśl) were transferred to Poland. In place of the rest of former Peremyshl Raion, the Nyzhankovychy Raion (centered at a town of Nyzhankovychy) was created. On May 15, 1948 whole Medyka Raion was transferred to Poland as well. On July 15, 1951, the municipality of Truskavets was created. On December 10, 1951, Nyzhnio Ustryky Raion was followed along with another transferring process to Poland (see 1951 Polish-Soviet territorial exchange). In July 1957, Khyriv Raion was disestablished. Five more raions were liquidated on January 21, 1959: Dubliany, Zhuravno, Krukenych, Novi Strelyshcha, and Strilky. Sometime before May 1959, Pidbuzh Raion was liquidated, however Boryslav Raion was reinstated. On May 1, 1959, there were 19 raions and five municipalities. On May 21, 1959, Drohobych Oblast was merged with Lviv Oblast.

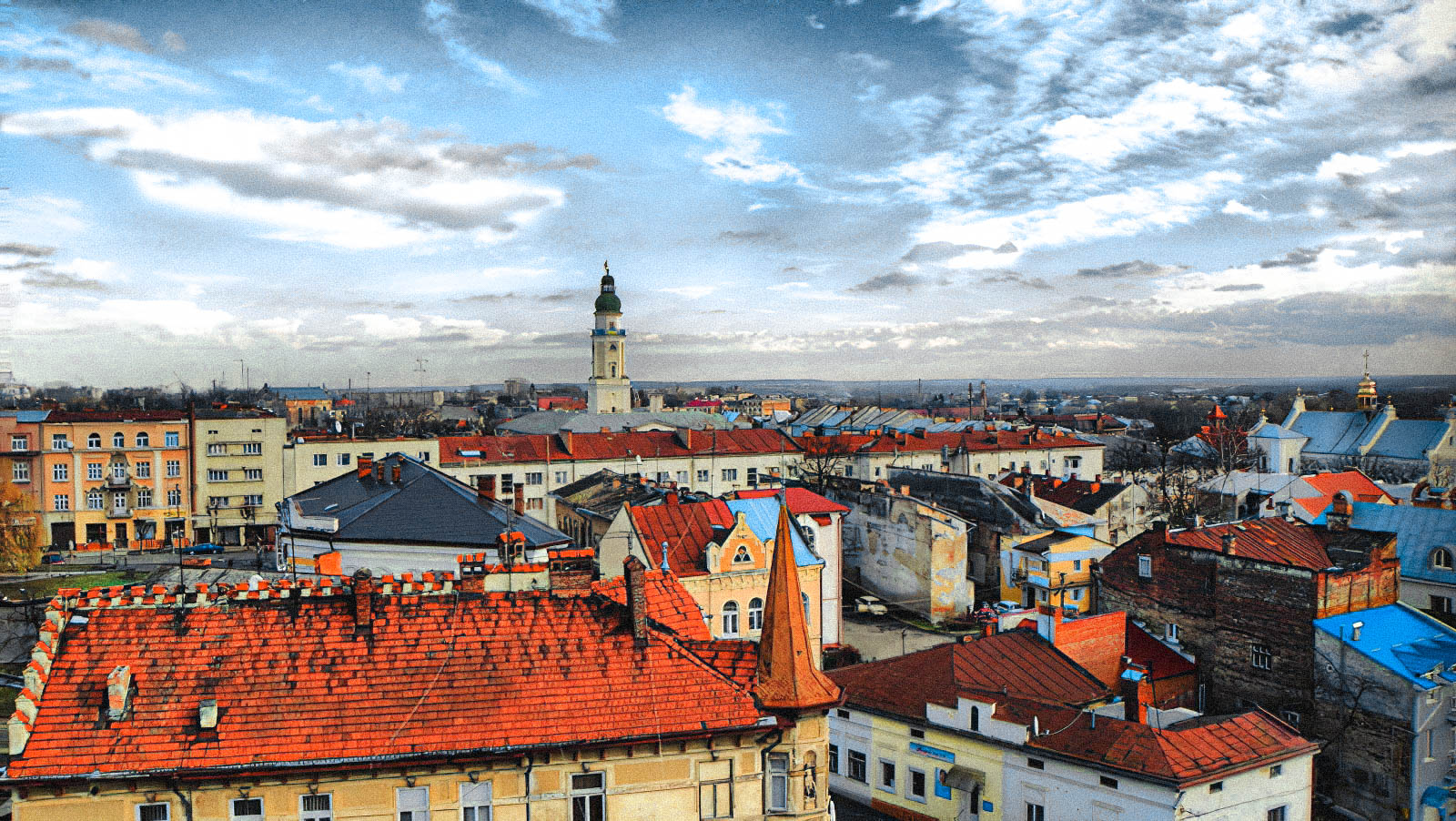
Drohobych

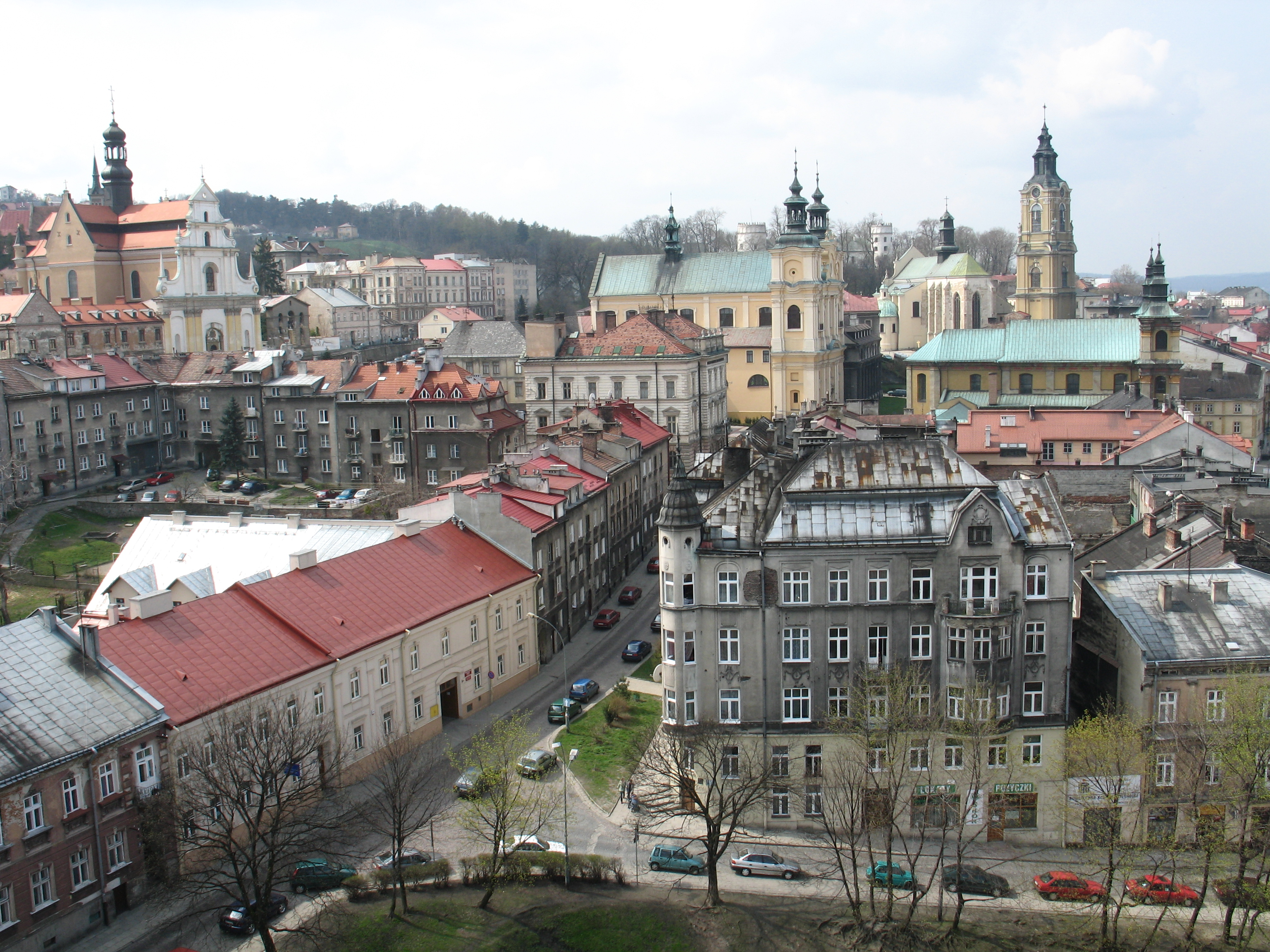
Peremyshl

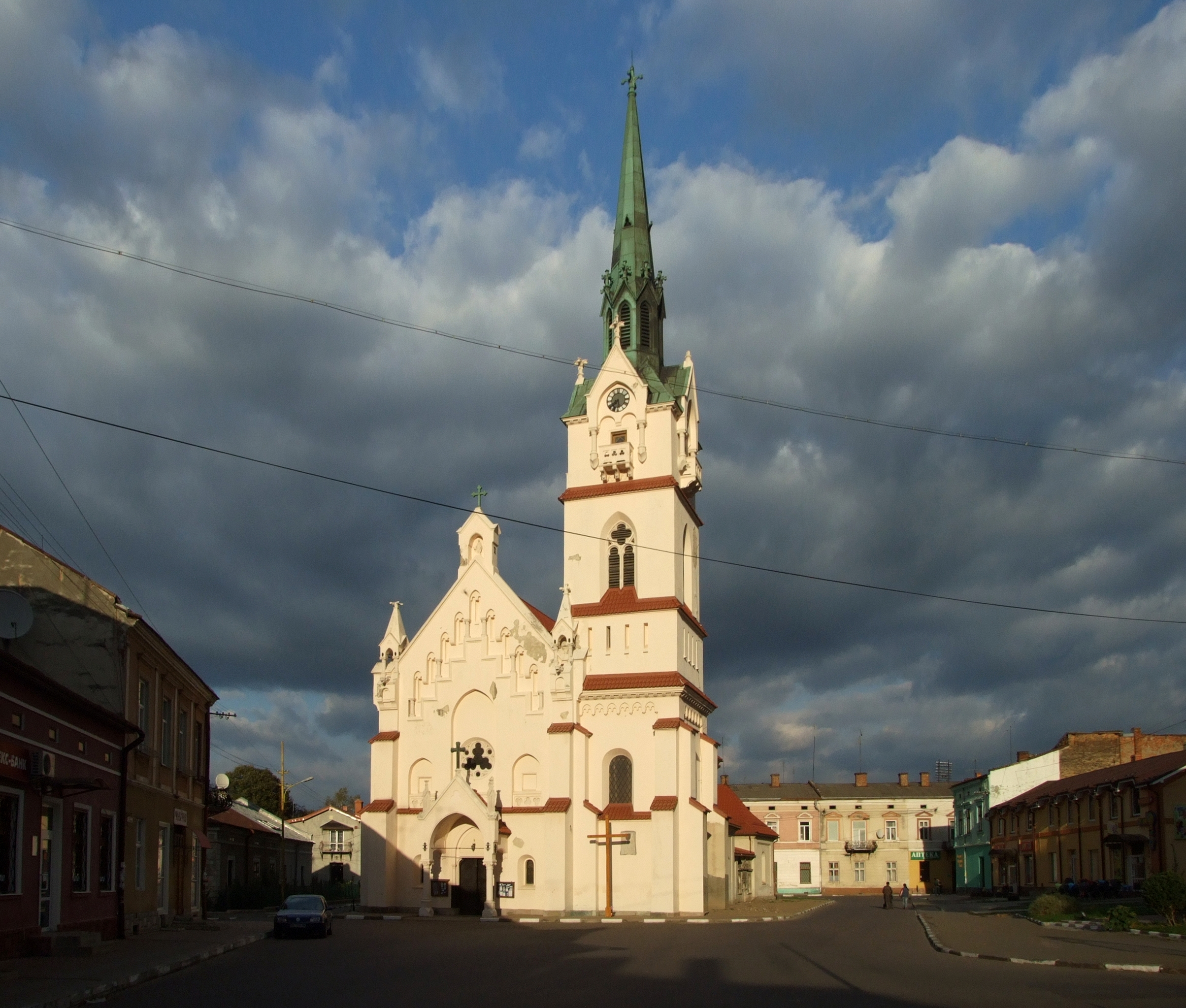
Stryi

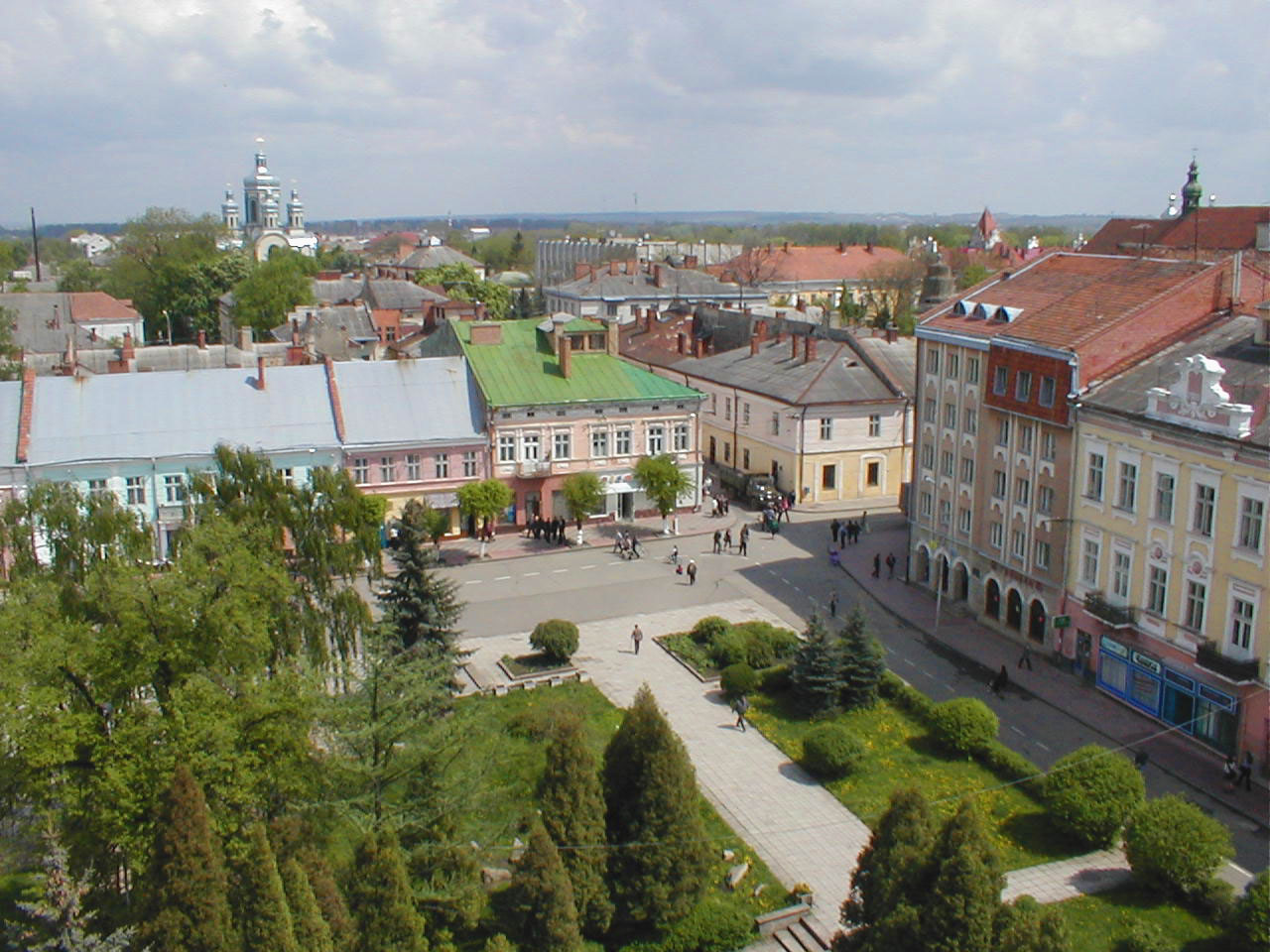
Sambir

== Governors ==
Governors or chairmen of regional executive committee:

- December 8, 1939 – June 30, 1941 – Danylo Lezhenko (evacuated)
- August 1941 – 1942 – Eduard Edamczyk (kreishauptman)
- 1942 – 1944 – Gargens (kreishauptman)
- 1944 – 1946 – Danylo Lezhenko (returned)
- 1946 – 1947 – Ivan Kravchuk
- 1947 – 1957 – Ivan Yavorskyi (until August 21)
- 1957 – May 1959 – Illia Tarnavskyi
