= Izmail Oblast =

Oblast of the Ukrainian SSR (1940–54)

Izmail Oblast Ізмаїльська область Regiunea Ismail
- Oblast of the Ukrainian SSR
- 1940–1954
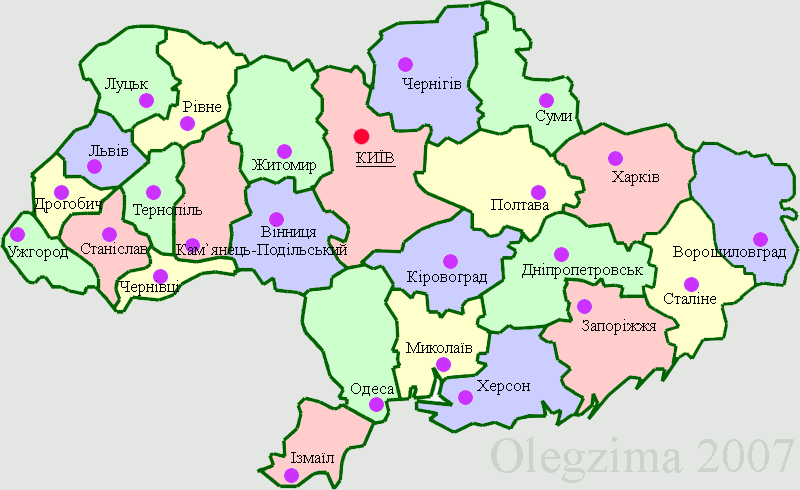
- Map of the Ukrainian SSR oblasts during 1946–1954
- Capital: Izmail^{a}
- Area
  - Coordinates: 45°21′N 28°52′E
  - 1954: 12,400 km^{2} (4,800 sq mi)
- Population
  - 1954: 96,000
- History
  - Established (as Akkerman Oblast): 7 August 1940
  - Renamed: 1 December 1940
  - Merged into Odesa Oblast: 15 February 1954
Preceded by	Succeeded by
Kingdom of Romania	Odesa Oblast
- a. The oblast's capital was Akkerman before it was moved to Izmail on 1 December 1940.

Izmail Oblast (Ukrainian: Ізмаїльська область, romanized: Izmailska oblast; Romanian: Regiunea Ismail) (7 August 1940 — 15 February 1954) was an oblast in the Ukrainian SSR, roughly corresponding to the historical region of Budjak in southern Bessarabia. It had a territory of 12,400 km^{2} (4,800 sq mi). The region had a multi-ethnic population consisting of Ukrainians, Bulgarians, Russians, Moldovans, and Gagauz.

First mentions of the name of the region are found in documents from 16th century CE. The region was with the Russian Empire briefly before the Ottomans took control of it in the 17th century CE. Russians recaptured it in 1809 and it became an autonomous territory within the Ottoman Empire following the Crimean War (1853-1856). The area was under Russian occupation from 1877 to 1917, and was occupied by Romania after the First World War. The Soviet Union re-took control of it after the Molotov-Ribbentrop Pact before the Second World War in 1939-40.

The region was organized as a separate oblast known as Akkerman oblast on 7 August 1940 after the city of Akkerman. It was renamed later in 1940 to Izmail oblast, and the capital was moved to the city of Izmail. It was absorbed into the Odesa Oblast in February 1954. The region became part of the independent state of Ukraine, following the dissolution of Soviet Union in the 1990s.

== History ==
=== Early history ===
The region stands in the area roughly corresponding to the Greek colony of Antioch in the 4th century CE. First mentions of the name are found in documents from 16th century CE, which indicate that Ottoman ruler Murad III gave a charter of the lands to Mehmed Habishi-Azi on 14 November 1589 with instructions to establish a port and town near the area of Ismail Gedici. The city of Izmail was founded in 1590 under a different name, and a fortress was constructed in 1592. In Cossacks first captured the region in 1595 under the command of Hetman Nalyvaiko. In the 17th century, the region was subject to multiple attacks from the Cossacks.

=== Russian occupation ===
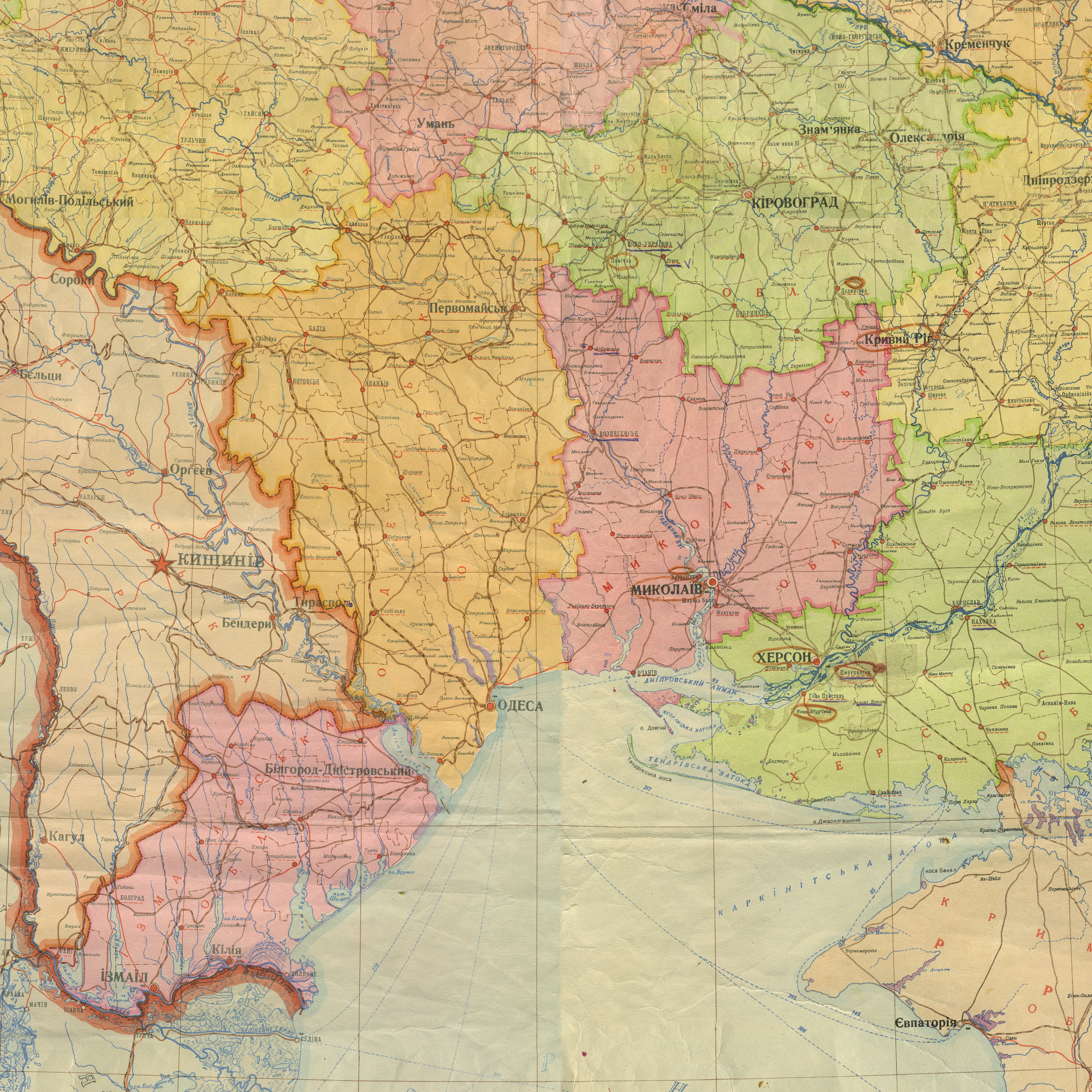
Izmail Oblast (left pink), 1947

The Russian Empire took control of the region in 1770, before the Ottomans recaptured it four years later. In 1790, during the Russo-Turkish War, the region was re-captured by the Russian army led by General Alexander Suvorov. The Russians occupied it until 1791, after which it was again occupied by the Turks. While Russians recaptured it in 1809 and it became part of the Ottoman empire following the Crimean War (1853-1856). As per the Treaty of Paris (1856), the territory became part of the Principality of Moldova, and the garrison at the fort was dismantled.

The area was under Russian occupation from 1877 to 1917, when it was organized as a region in Bessarabia. It was occupied by Romania in 1917 towards the end of the First World War, and the Soviet Union re-took control of it after the Molotov-Ribbentrop Pact before the Second World War in 1939-40.

=== Later history ===
The region was organized as a separate oblast known as Akkerman oblast on 7 August 1940 after the city of Akkerman. It was renamed later in December 1940 to Izmail oblast, and the capital was moved to the city of Izmail. In June 1941, 3,767 people were deported, or on the list of people eligible for deportation, by the Soviet authorities from the Izmail Oblast to Siberia and Kazakhstan. Only 1,136 of those deported from the Izmail oblast were alive in Western Siberia (Tomsk region) in 1951. It was absorbed into the Odesa Oblast on 15 February 1954. The region became part of the independent state of Ukraine, following the dissolution of Soviet Union in the 1990s. It was subject to multiple Russian attacks during the Russo-Ukrainian War.

== Geography ==
The oblast was organized in the territory known as Budjak in southern Bessarabia. It covered an area of 12,400 km^{2} (4,800 sq mi) between the Danube and Dnieper Rivers. It was located strategically on the Black Sea coast. The region had a multi-ethnic population consisting of Ukrainians, Bulgarians, Russians, Moldovans, and Gagauz.

== See also ==
- Izmail Raion
