= Povit =

County territorial unit in Ukraine

Povits of Ukraine
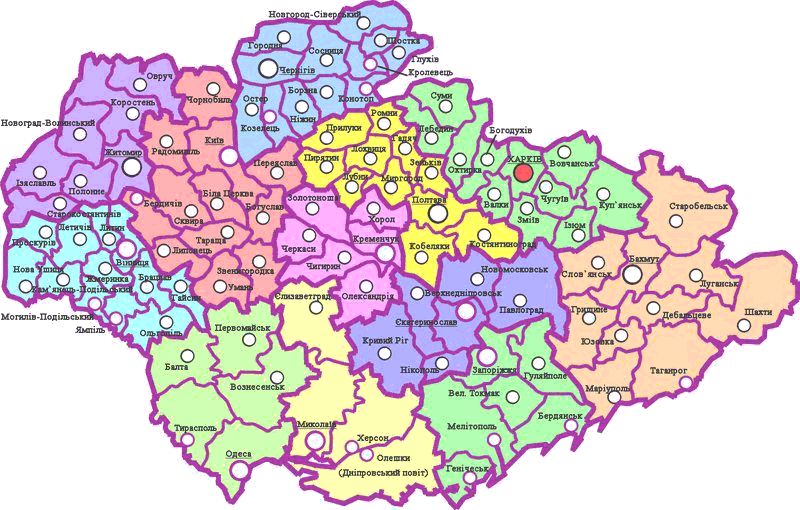
- Povits in 1921 following the Treaty of Riga
- Category: Second level of subdivision
- Location: Ukrainian People's Republic / Ukrainian SSR
- Found in: Governorates of Ukraine
- Created: 1918
- Abolished: 1923
- Number: 99 (as of 1923)
- Government: Povit council
- Subdivisions: volosts

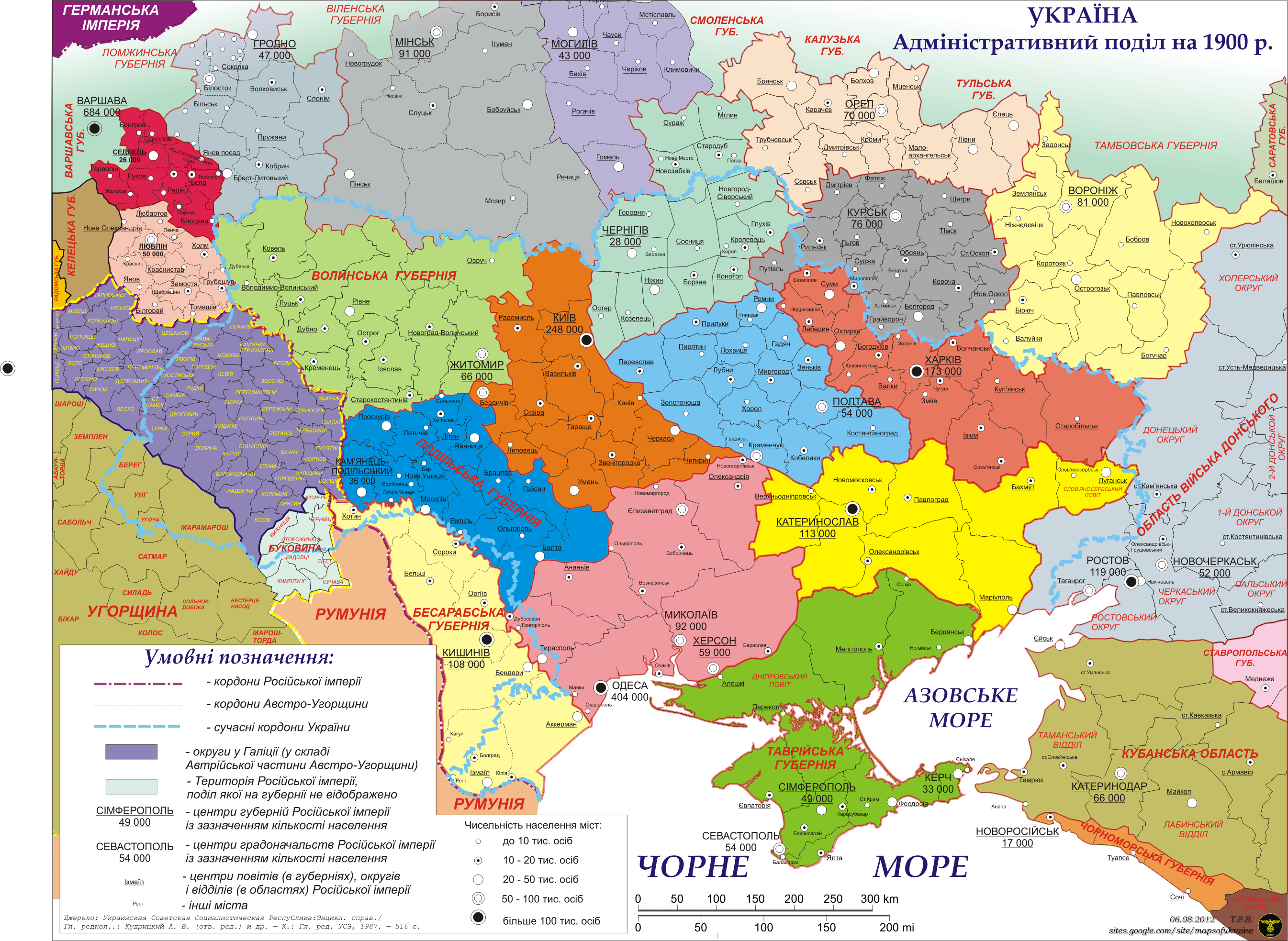
Povits in Ukraine in 1900

A povit (Ukrainian: повіт), also known as a county, was a type of historical territorial-administrative and judicial unit in Ukraine, administered by a starosta. Under the Russian Empire, the Russian administration introduced the system of uezds which locally (in Ukrainian language) were still referred in old manner as povits. After Ukraine declared its independence in 1918, povits remained in use until the introduction of raions in 1923.

== Description ==
Counties were introduced in Ukrainian territories under Poland (the Commonwealth Rzeczpospolita to be more precise) in the second half of the 14th century (Polish: powiat). More detailed norms were adopted in the Second Statutes of Lithuania of 1566.

They were introduced in the eighteenth century in the Cossack State by the judicial reforms of Hetman Kyrylo Rozumovskyi – while the system of Cossack regiments and companies remained in use as well (see Cossack host) – and they became administrative and financial entities in 1782. Under the Russian Empire, counties were also introduced in Sloboda Ukraine, Southern Ukraine, and Right-Bank Ukraine (Russian: уезд, romanized: uezd).

In 1913, there were 126 counties in Ukrainian-inhabited territories of the Russian Empire. Under the Austrian Empire in 1914, there were 59 counties in Ukrainian-inhabited Galicia, 34 in Transcarpathia, and 10 in Bukovina. Counties were retained by the independent Ukrainian People's Republic of 1917–1921, and in Czechoslovakia, Poland, and Romania until the Soviet annexations at the start of World War II. 99 counties formed the Ukrainian SSR in 1919, where they were abolished in 1923–25 in favour of 53 okruhas (in turn replaced by oblasts in 1930–32), although they existed in the Zakarpattia Oblast until 1953.

== List of povits ==
=== Volhynian Governorate ===
- Starokostiantyniv povit
- Iziaslav povit
- Novohrad-Volynskyi povit
- Polonne povit (created out of portions of Novohrad-Volynskyi povit)
- Zhytomyr povit
- Korosten povit (created out of portions of Ovruch povit)
- Ovruch povit

=== Kyiv Governorate ===
List in 1922

- Berdychiv povit
- Bila Tserkva povit (renamed, until 1919 Vasylkiv povit)
- Cherkasy povit (returned from Kremenchuk Governorate in 1922)
- Chornobyl povit (created in 1919 out of portions of Radomysl povit)
- Chyhyryn povit (returned from Kremenchuk Governorate in 1922)
- Kaniv povit
- Kyiv povit
- Lypovets povit
- Pereiaslav povit
- Radomysl povit
- Skvyra povit
- Tarashcha povit
- Uman povit
- Zvenyhorodka povit
