= Small Mosque, Izmail =

Mosque in Izmail, Ukraine

Small Mosque
- Ukrainian: Мала мечеть Turkish: Küçük Camii
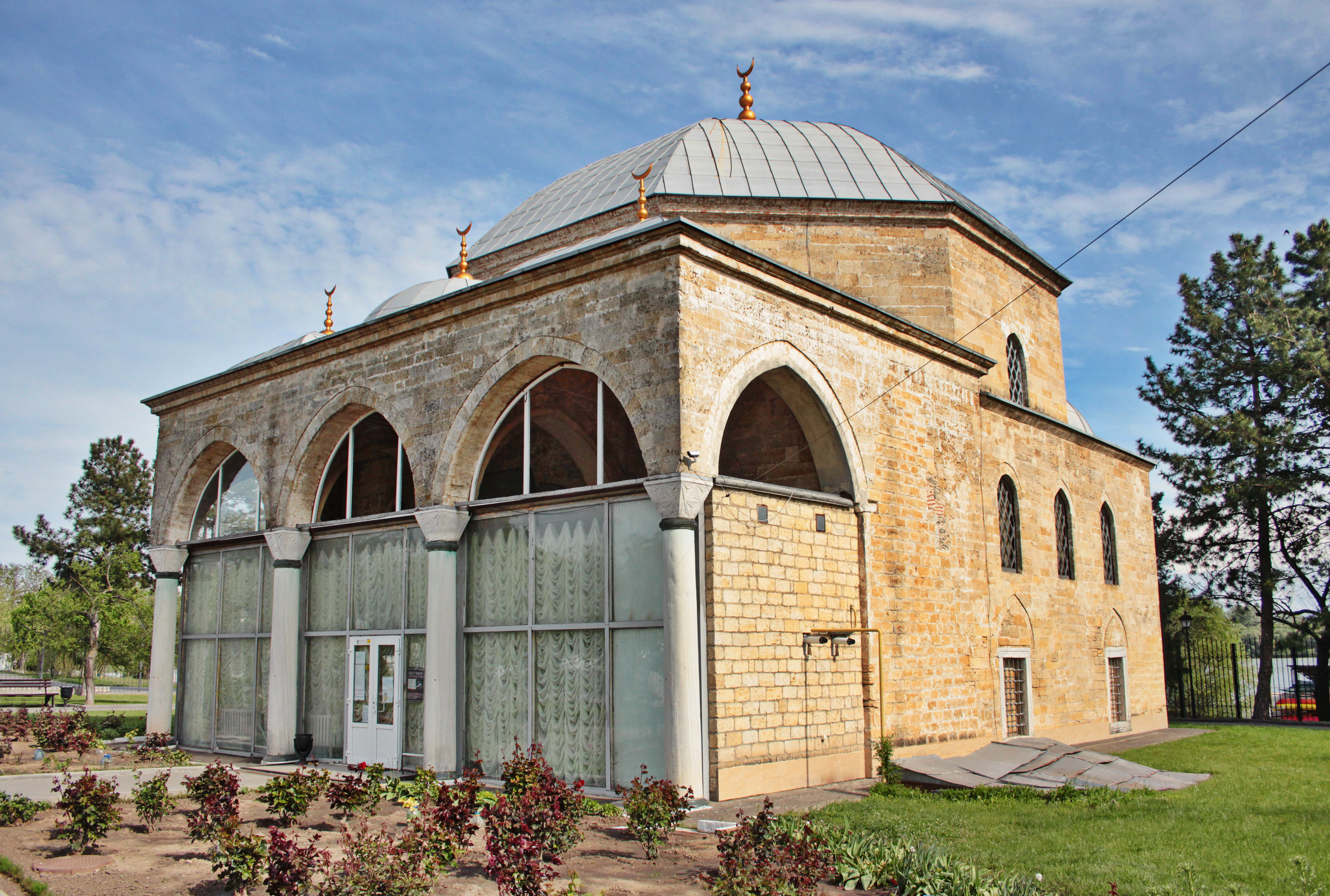

Religion
- Affiliation: Islam
- Status: Museum

Location
- Location: Izmail
- State: Odesa Oblast
- Country: Ukraine
- Interactive map of Small Mosque
- Coordinates: 45°20′21.5″N 28°48′24.0″E

Architecture
- Style: Ottoman
- Groundbreaking: 15th century
- Completed: 16th century

Small Mosque (Ukrainian: Мала мечеть; Turkish: Küçük Camii) is a former Ottoman mosque in Izmail, Ukraine. It is an architectural and urban planning monument of national significance. The mosque is currently not active. It is part of the Izmail Military and Historic Museum Complex. The mosque is a unique example of Ottoman architecture in Ukraine.

== History ==
The building was constructed in 15th–16th century on the territory of the Turkish fortress. During the Siege of Izmail of 1790, the Turks held defenses inside the mosque. After the capture of the fortress by Russian forces, the mosque was turned into a church and named after the Exaltation of the Holy Cross in 1810. In the 19th century, the minaret was destroyed, and gallery was covered by a tilted roof.

In 1971–1973, lost details and the roof were restored to their original forms.

On 9 May 1973, a diorama depicting the Siege of Izmail was opened.

== Description ==
The mosque belongs to the cupola type, which was popular in Muslim architecture from the 16th century. It is made of limestone blocks and plastered on the inside and outside. Its main volume is square with an octagon above topped with a cupola. The mosque features a gallery on the northern side and a carved mihrab in the southern wall. The remains of the minaret are located east of the building.

== Gallery ==
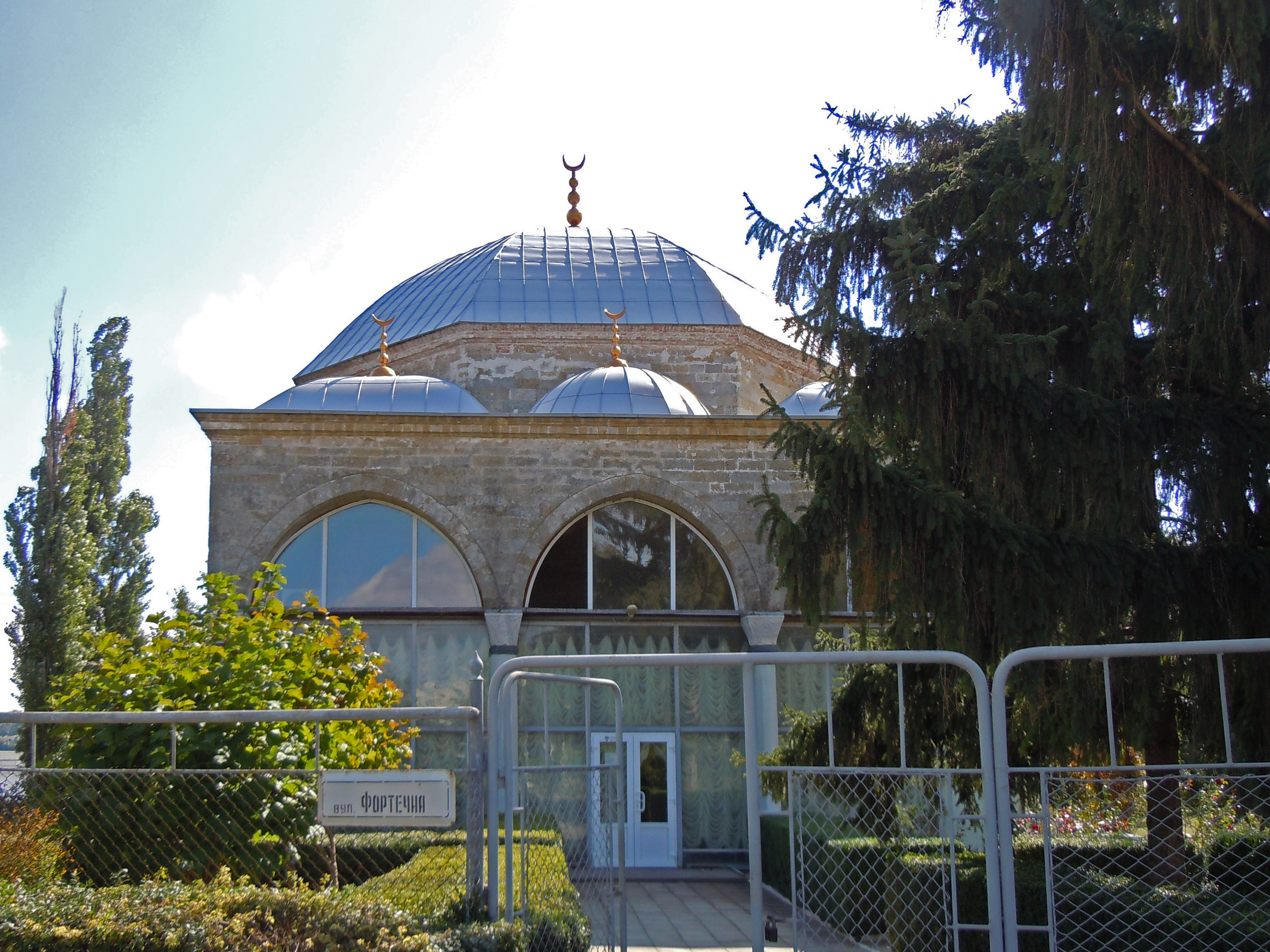
Façade

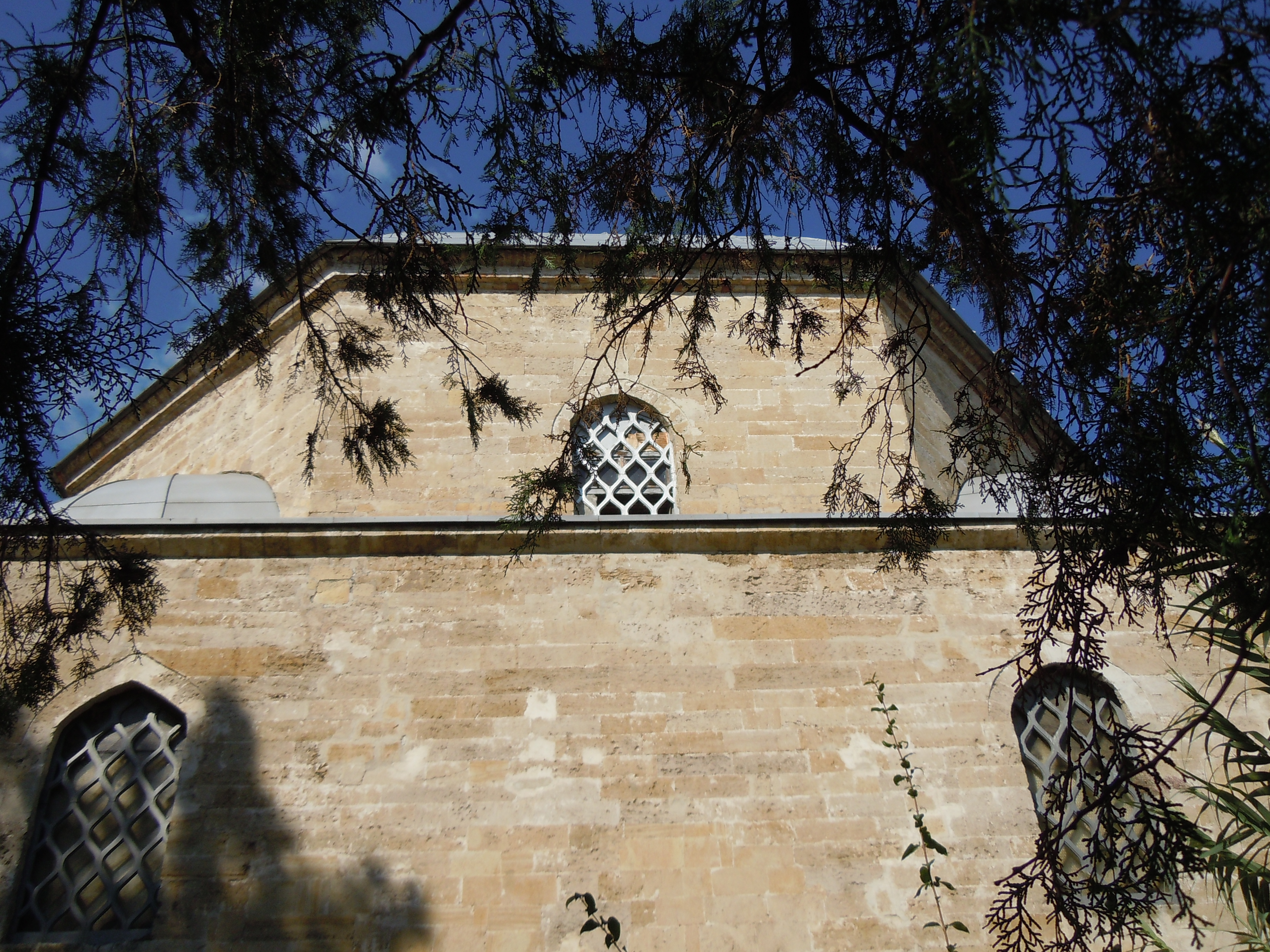
Back side

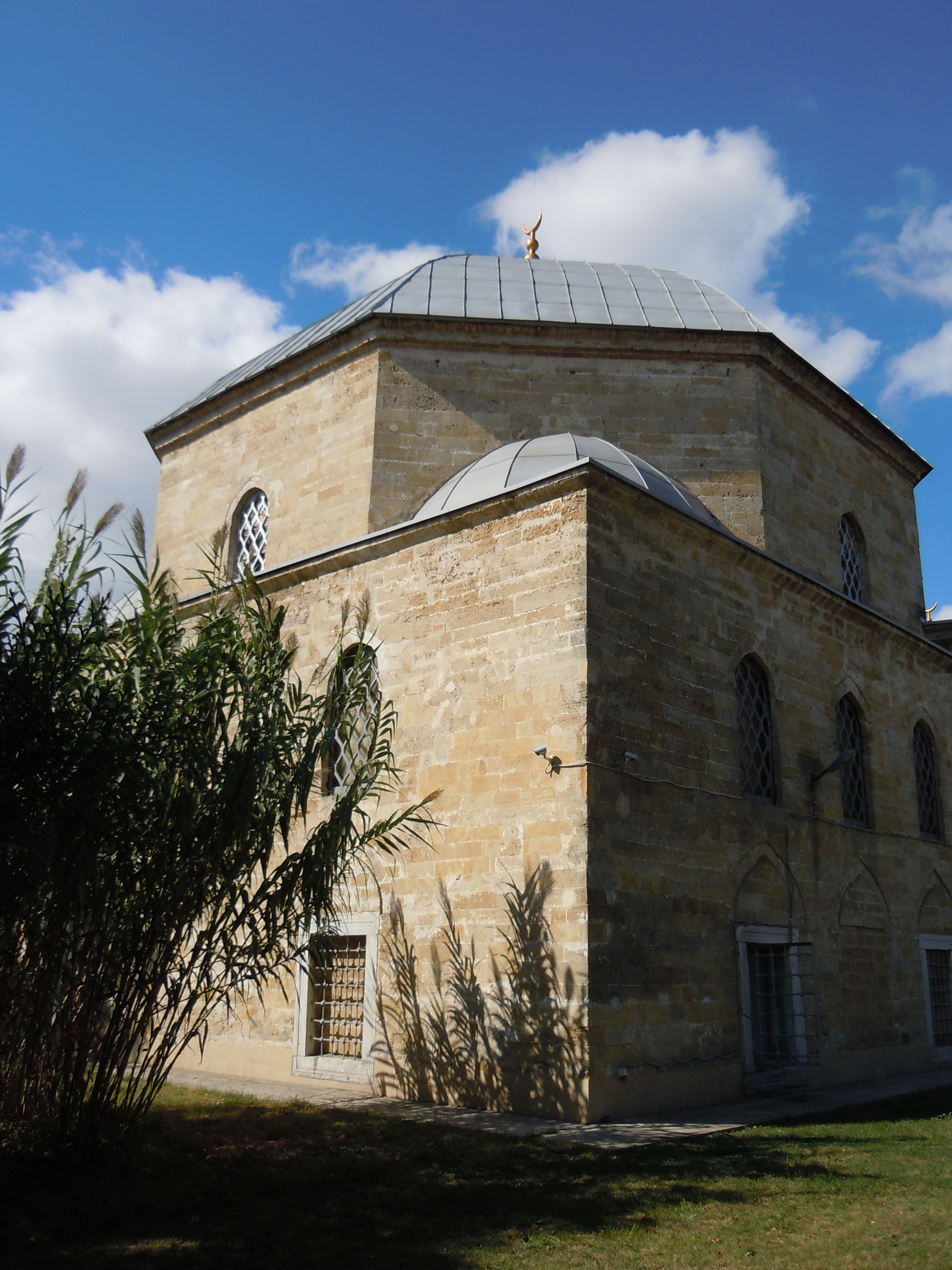
Northern side

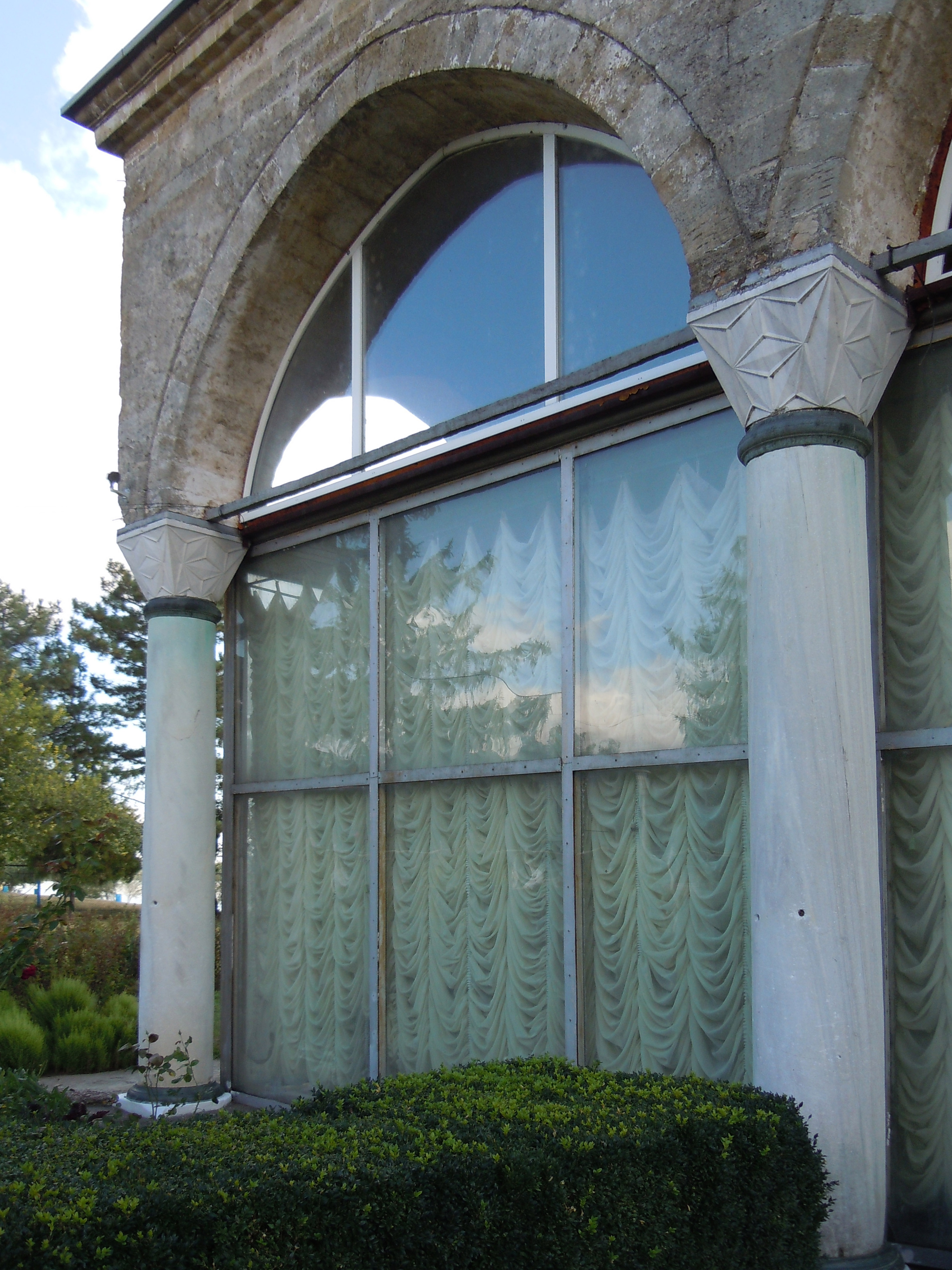
Columns

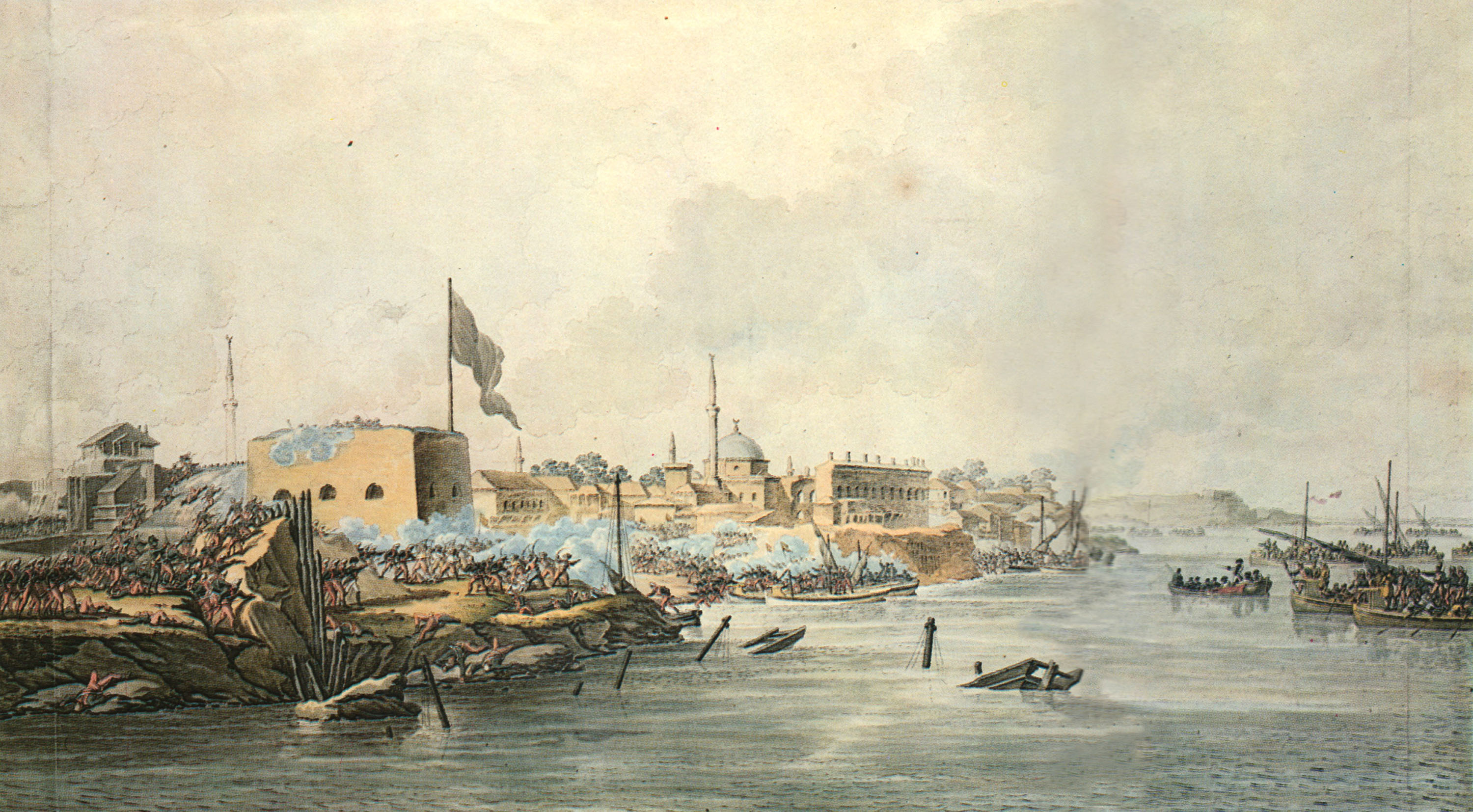
View of the Small Mosque on the painting Storming of Izmail

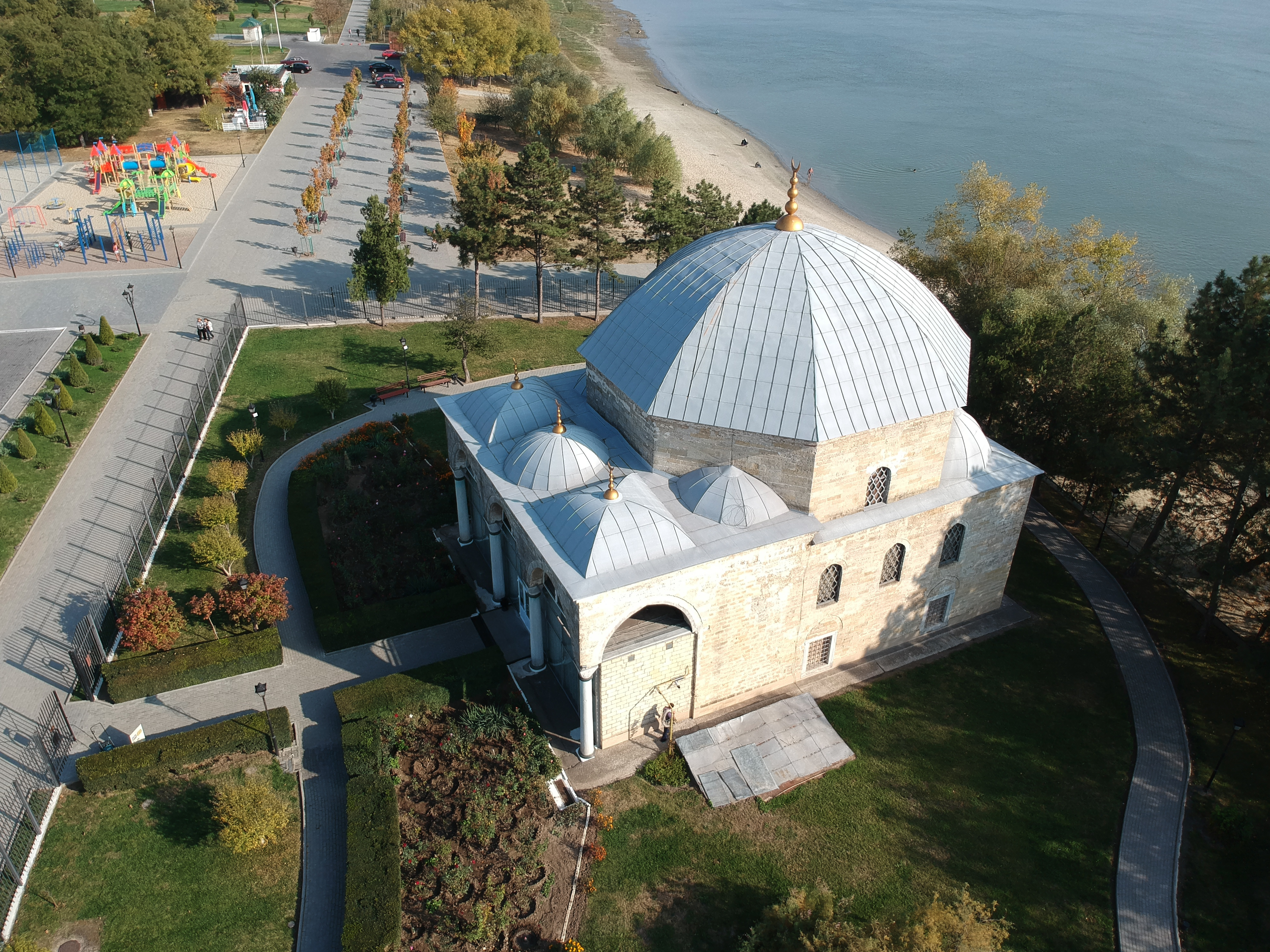
Bird's eye view

== See also ==
- Izmail City Mosque
- Islam in Ukraine

== Sources ==
- Мала мечеть (XV–XVI ст.) [Small Mosque (15th–16th centuries)]
- Сколько лет мечети Измаила? [How old is the Izmail Mosque?]
- Діорама Ізмаїла [Diorama Izmail]
