= Izmail City Mosque =

Mosque in Izmail, Ukraine

- Ізмаїльська міська мечеть
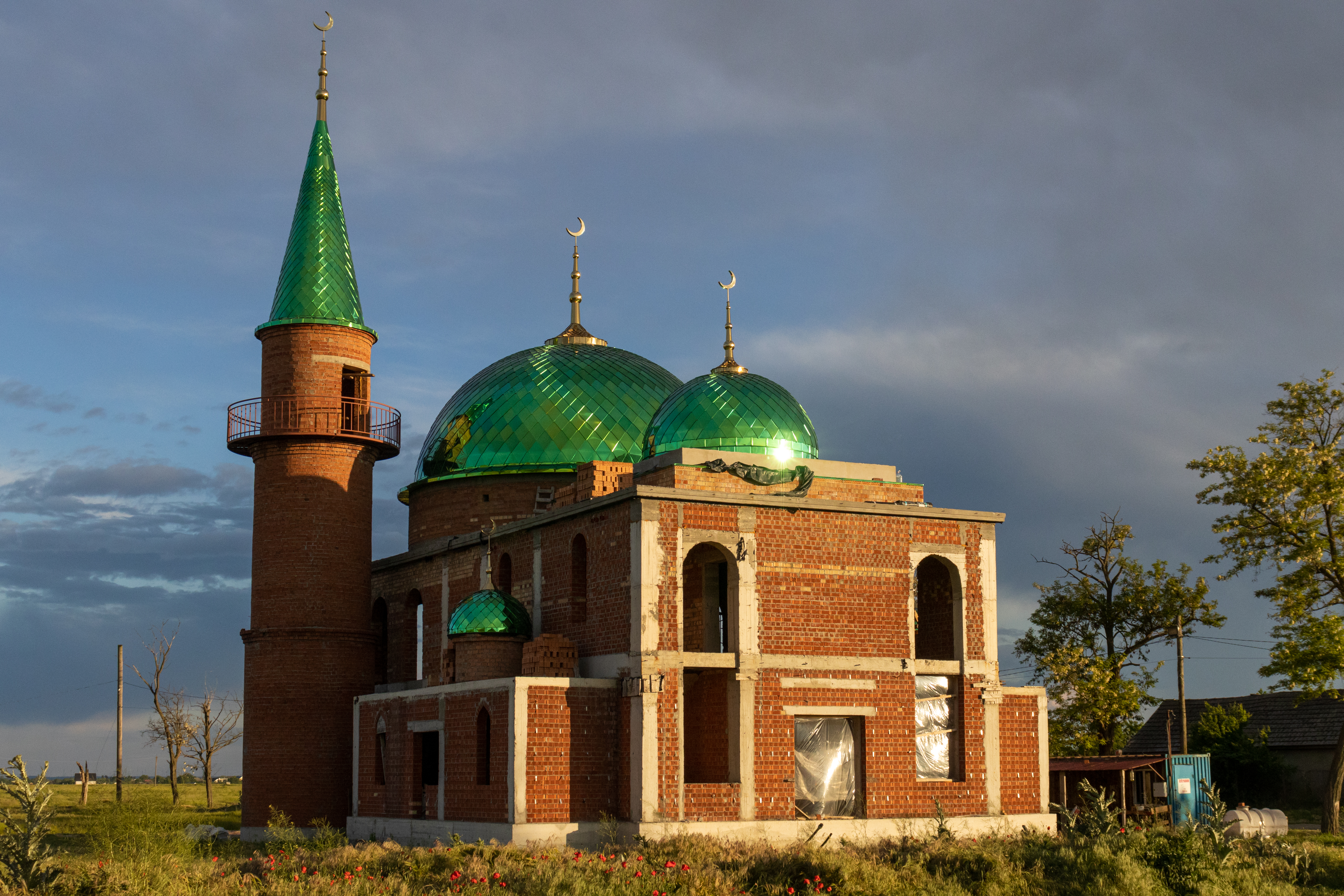
- The mosque in May 2025

Religion
- Affiliation: Islam
- District: Izmail Raion
- Region: Odesa Oblast
- Governing body: Clerical Board of Ukraine's Muslims
- Leadership: Imam Mukhyiddin Kamilov
- Status: Under construction

Location
- Location: Izmail
- Municipality: Izmail urban hromada
- Country: Ukraine
- Interactive map of Izmail City Mosque

Architecture
- Type: Mosque
- Groundbreaking: 11 November 2020

Specifications
- Direction of façade: 335°
- Length: ~21 metres (69 ft)
- Width: ~14 metres (46 ft)
- Dome: 4
- Minaret: 1
- Spire: 4
- Materials: brick, reinforced concrete

The Izmail City Mosque is a Muslim religious building under construction in the city of Izmail, Odesa Oblast, Ukraine. It was initiated by the local Muslim community with the participation of the Clerical Board of Ukraine's Muslims. The project is positioned as the restoration of a permanent functional prayer center for the Muslims of Izmail after a long period during which the city had no regular mosque in religious use.

== History ==
=== Construction ===
The official groundbreaking took place on 11 November 2020, coinciding with the Islamic month of Mawlid. The ceremony was attended by the city's imam Mukhyiddin Kamilov and the Chief Mufti of Ukraine, Sheikh Ahmed Tamim. Volunteers and benefactors also took part in the work – their involvement was attributed to a desire to support the religious initiative and to motives connected with continuous charity practices (Sadaqah Jariyah).

As of 2025, construction continues and is in its late stages, but the building has not yet been commissioned.

== Gallery ==
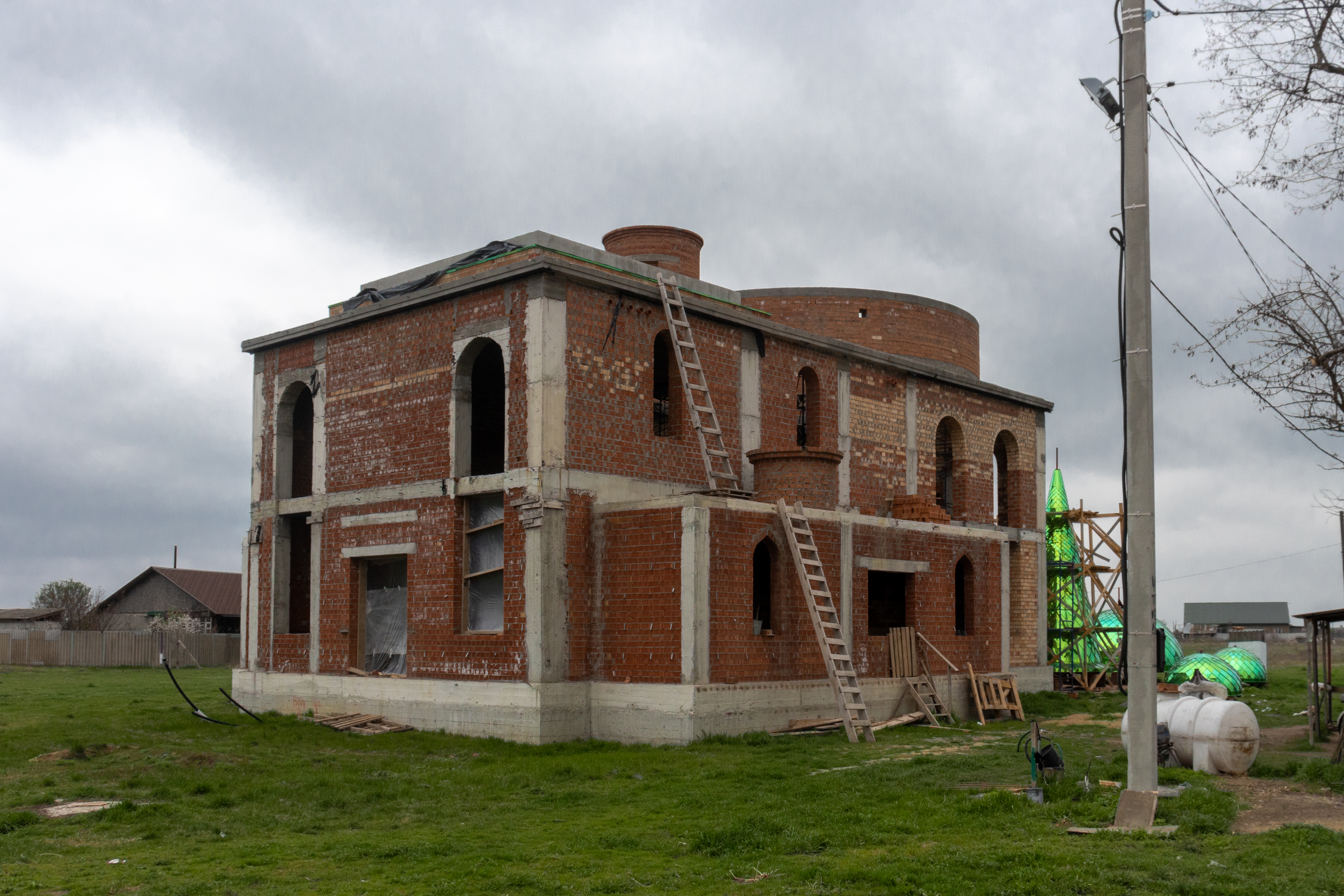
Before installation of the domes

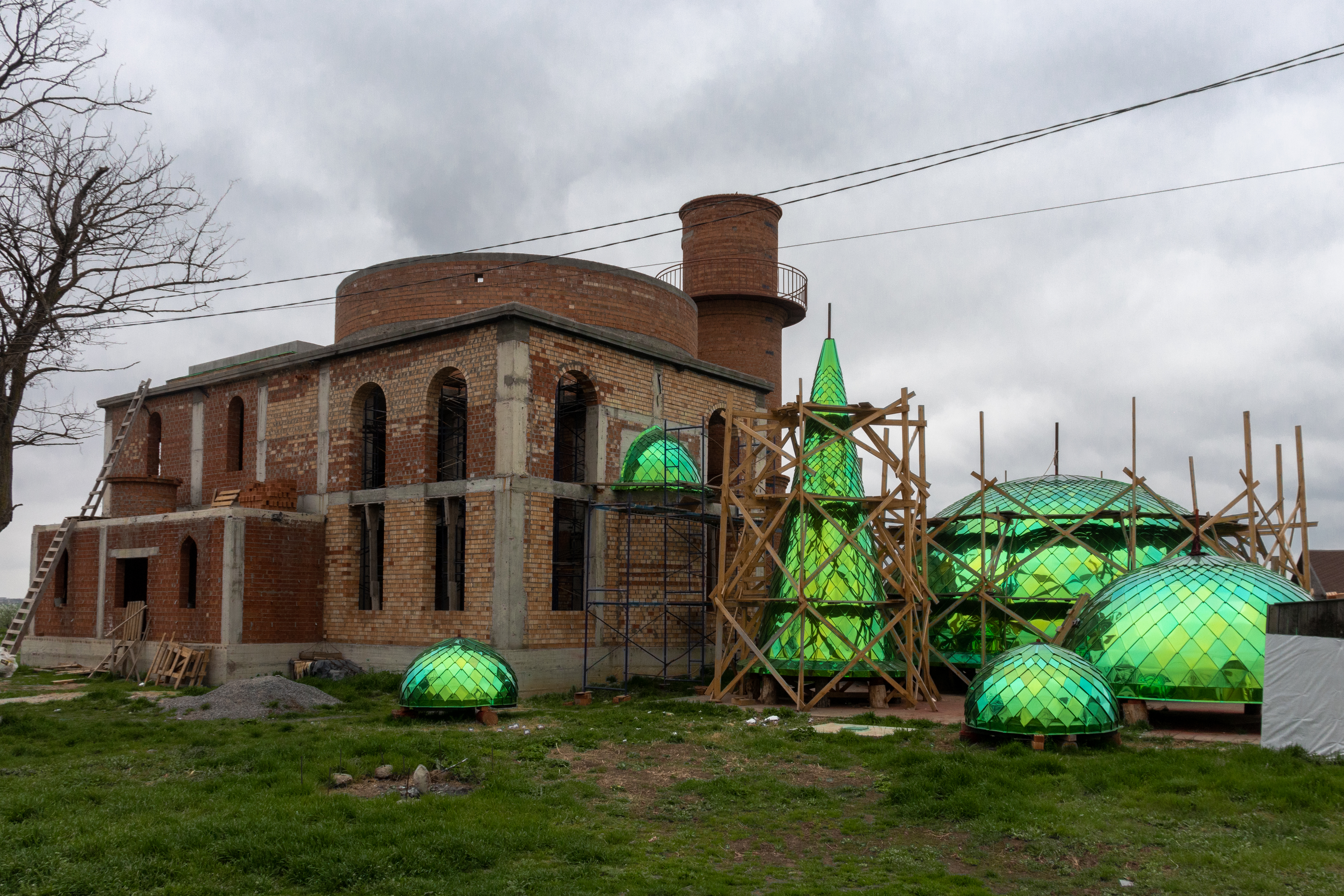
Before installation of the domes

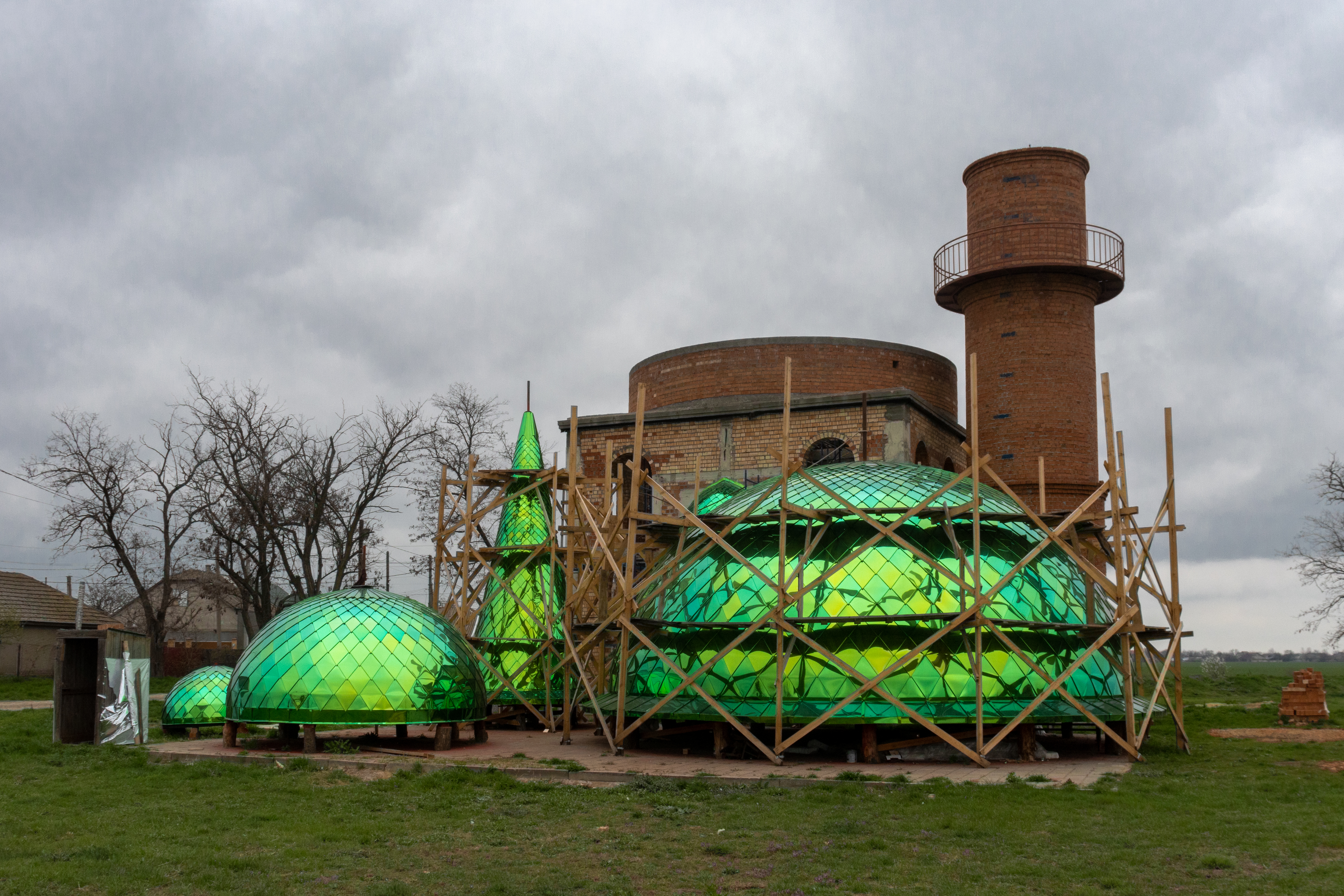
Before installation of the domes

== See also ==
- Islam in Ukraine
