= Izmail =

City in Odesa Oblast, Ukraine

Izmail Ізмаїл
- City
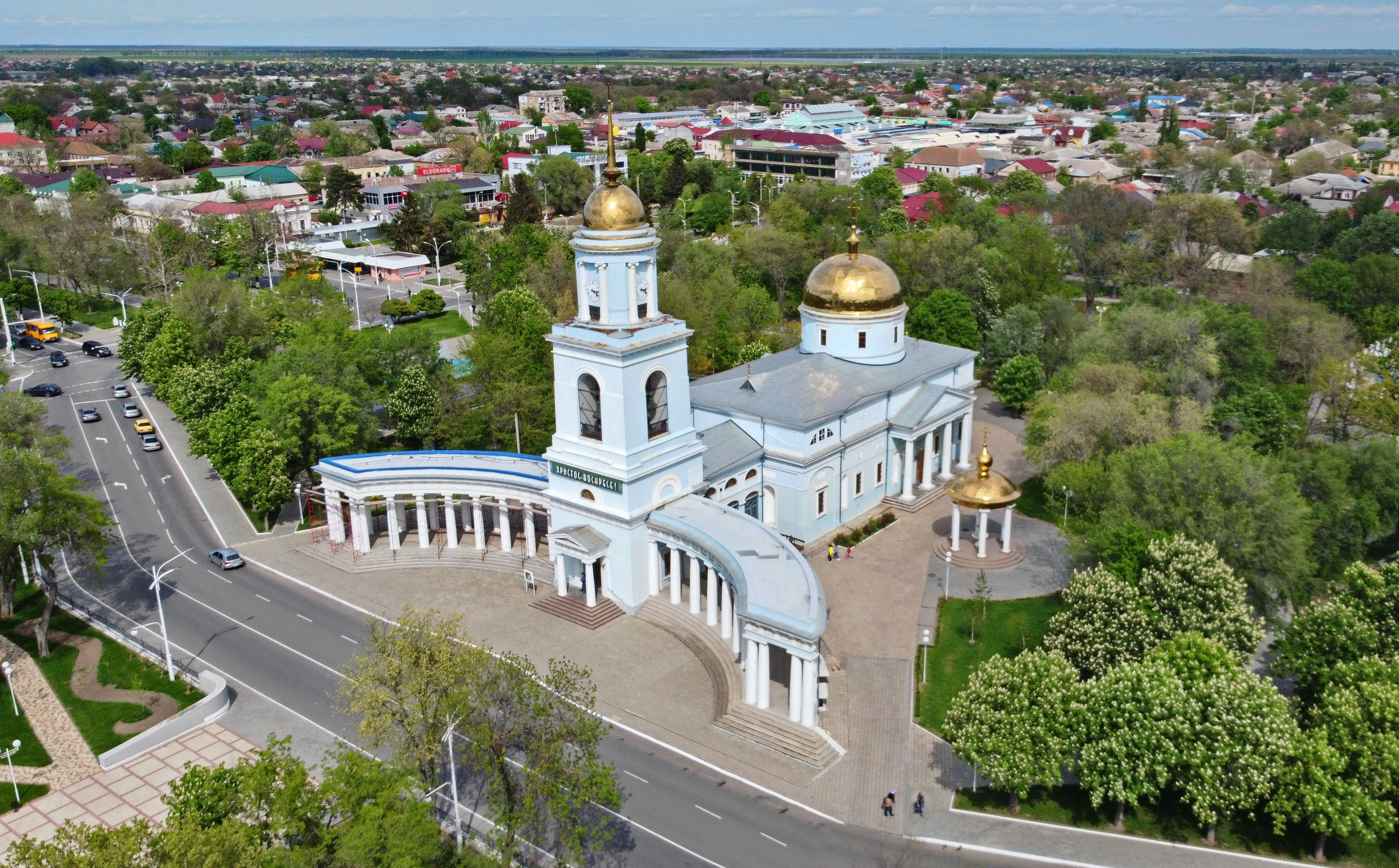
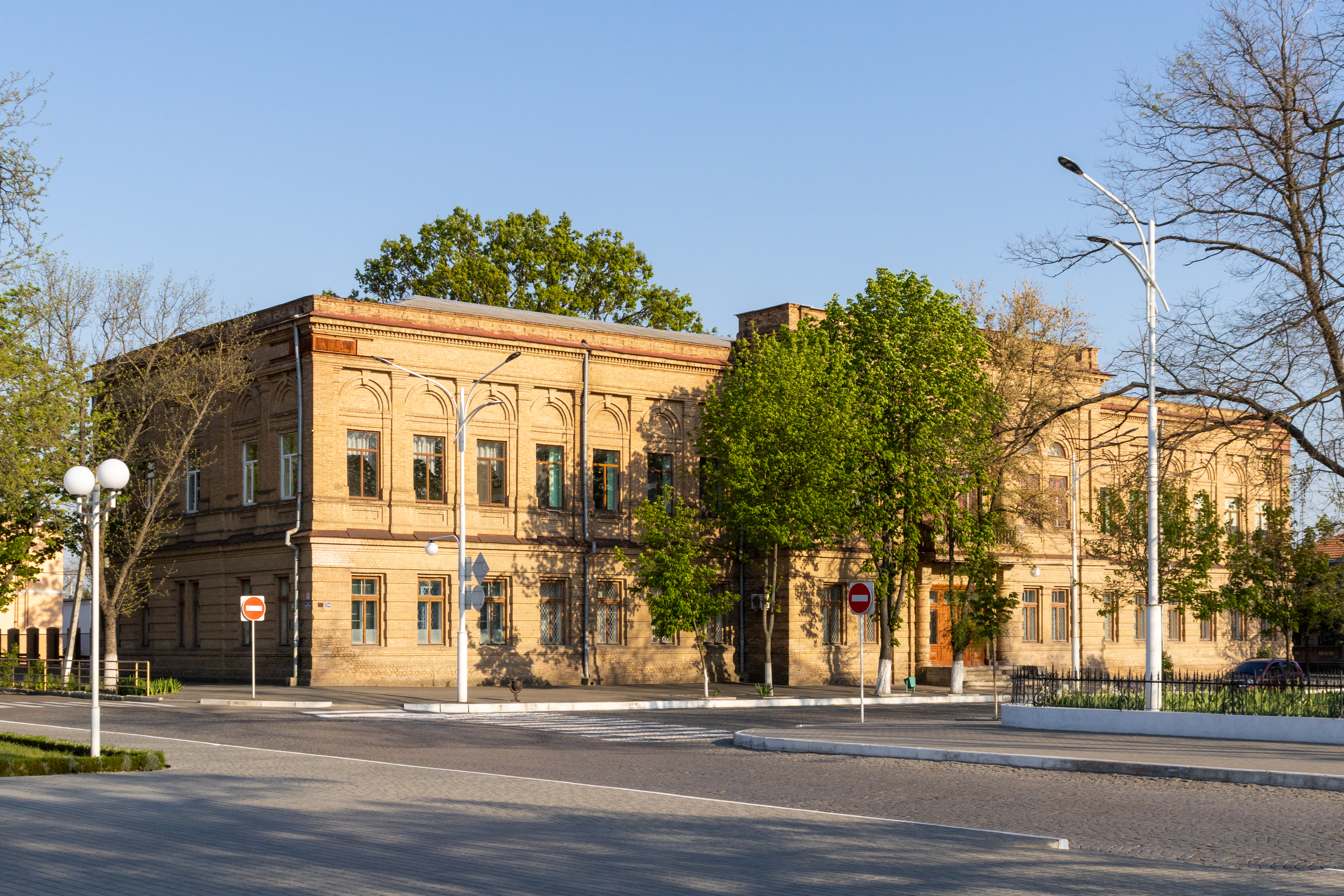
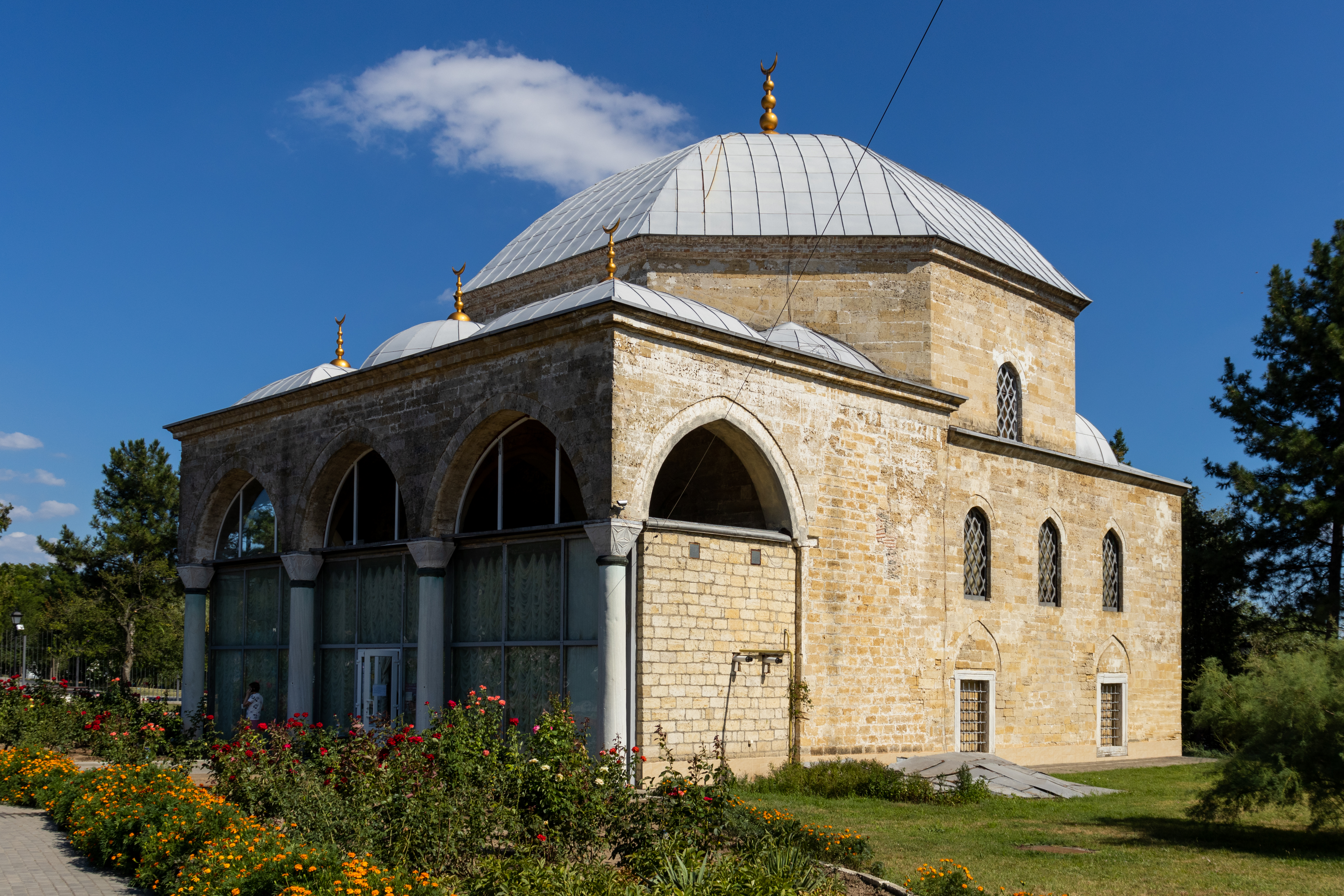
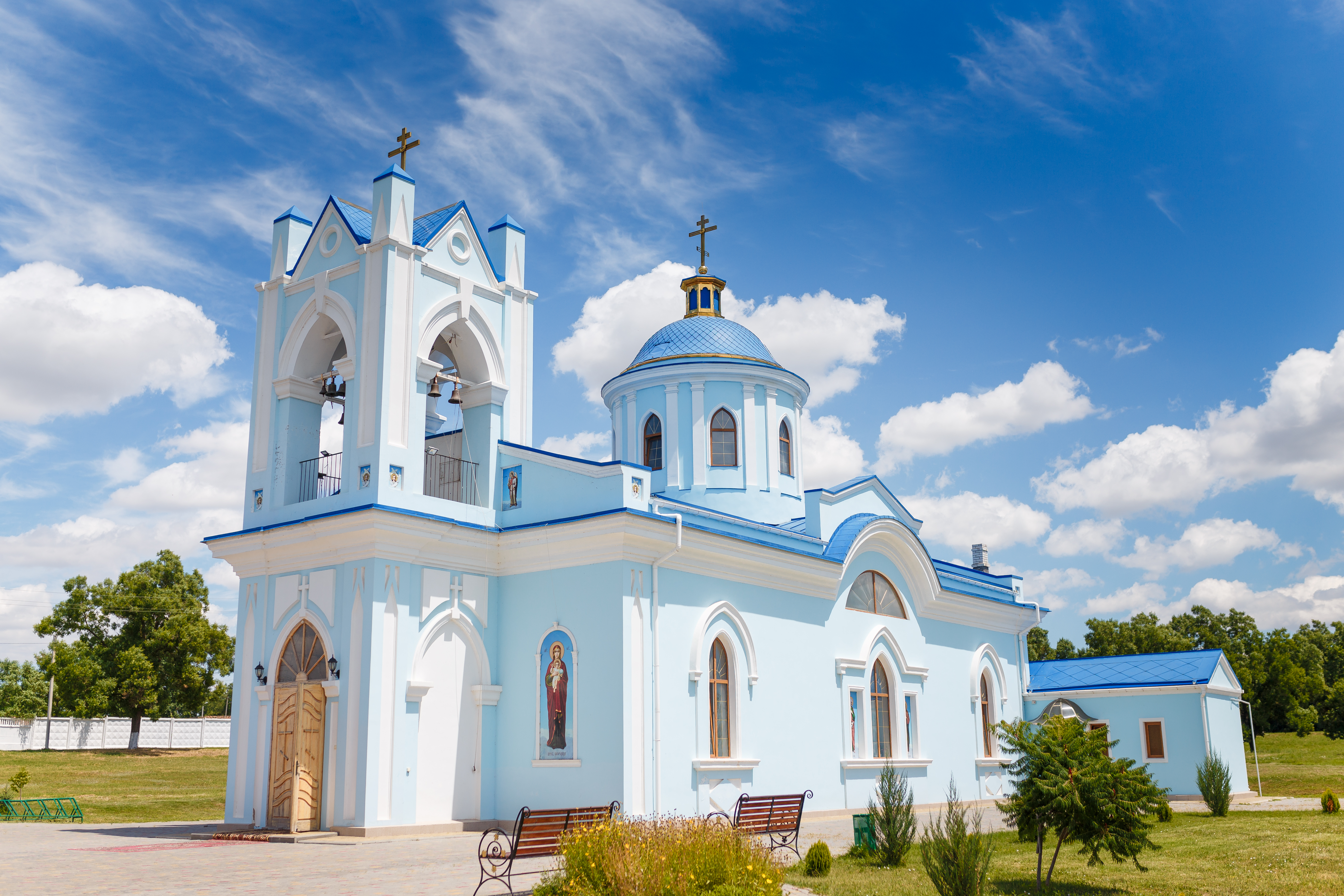
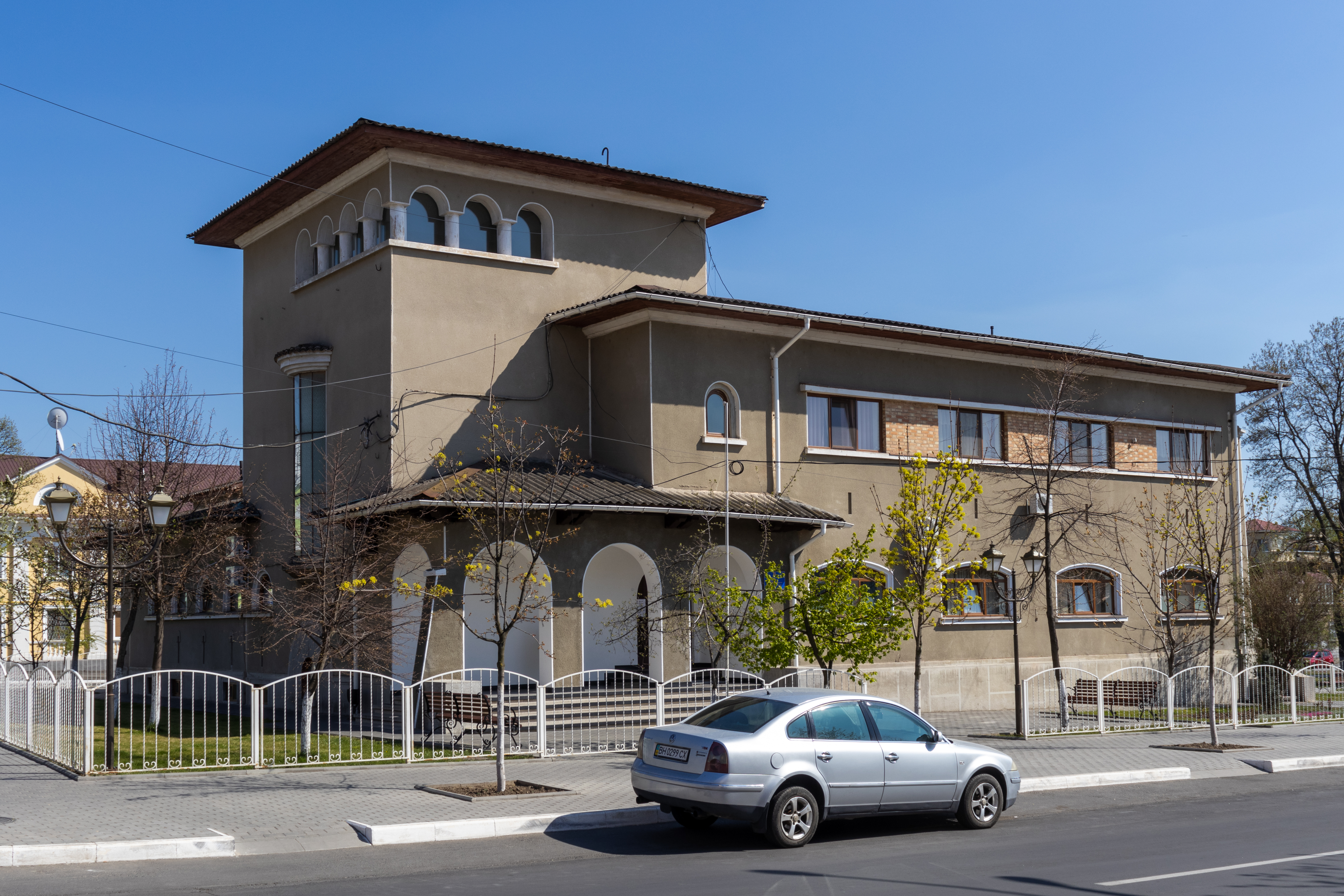
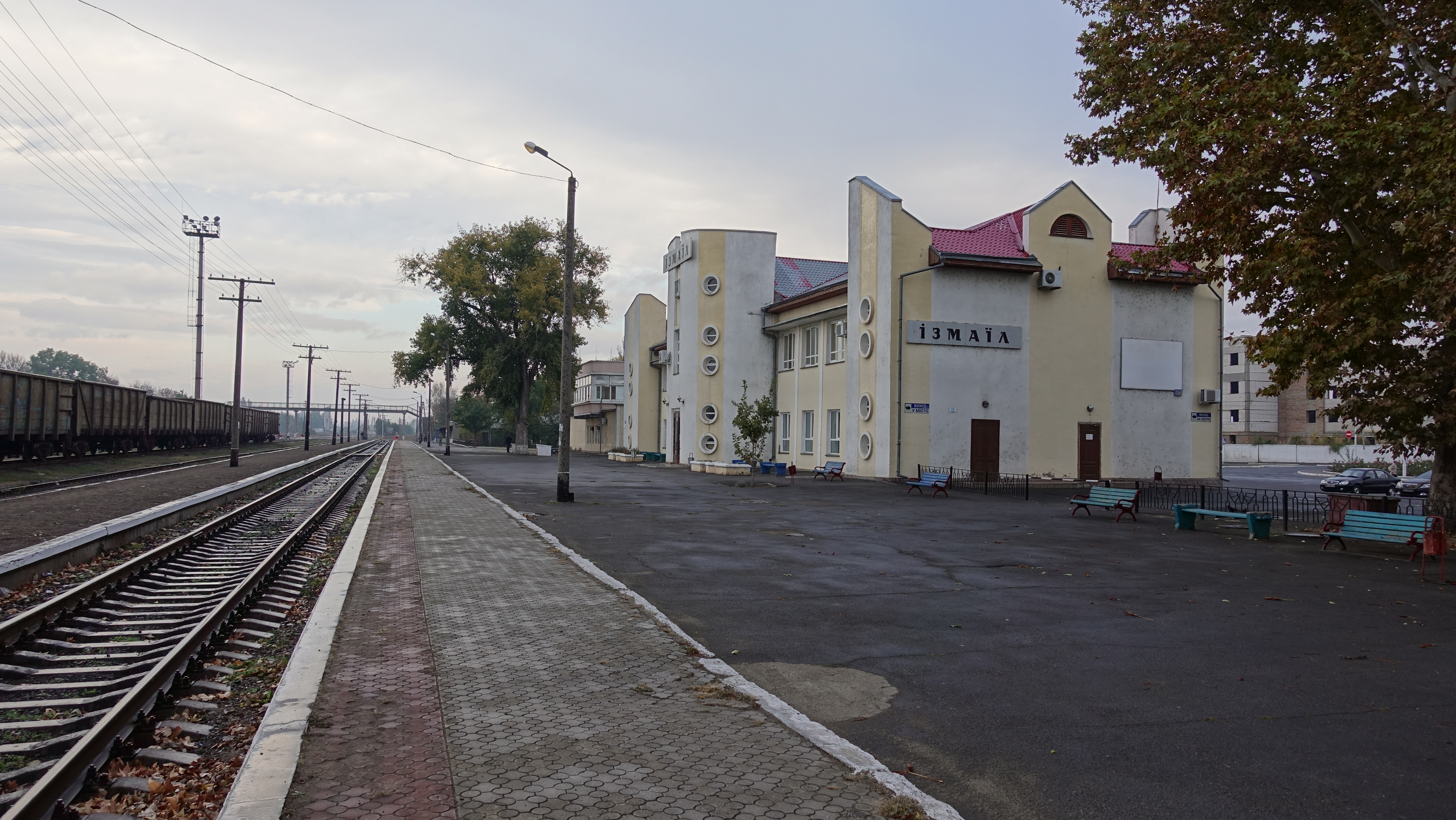
- Intercession Cathedral School No. 2 Small Mosque Dormition Church Military hospital Railway station

- Flag Coat of arms
- Motto(s): Faith, Freedom, Victory
- Interactive map of Izmail
- Location within Odesa Oblast Location within Ukraine
- Coordinates: 45°21′N 28°50′E
- Country: Ukraine
- Oblast: Odesa Oblast
- Raion: Izmail Raion
- Hromada: Izmail urban hromada
- Established: 1589
- City status: 1830

Area
  - Total: 54 km^{2} (21 sq mi)
- Elevation: 28 m (92 ft)

Population (2025)
  - Total: 69,182 ▼
  - Density: 1,300/km^{2} (3,300/sq mi)
- Time zone: UTC+2 (EET)
  - Summer (DST): UTC+3 (EEST)
- Postal code: 68600-68633
- Area code: +380 4841
- Climate: Cfa
- Website: izmail-rada.gov.ua

Izmail (Ukrainian: Ізмаїл, pronounced [izmɐˈjil]; Russian: Измаил; Romanian: Ismail, Smil or Smeilu; Bulgarian: Исмаил) is a city and municipality on the Danube river in Odesa Oblast in south-western Ukraine. It serves as the administrative center of Izmail Raion, one of seven districts of Odesa Oblast, and is the only locality which constitutes Izmail urban hromada, one of the hromadas of Ukraine.

In Russian historiography, Izmail is associated with the 18th century storming of the Ottoman fortress of Izmail by Russian general Alexander Suvorov. It was the capital of Izmail Oblast, but it is no longer, as Izmail Oblast joined Odesa Oblast in 1954. The city was previously also known as Tuchkov.

It is the largest Ukrainian port in the Danube Delta, on its Chilia branch. It is also the largest city of the Ukrainian Budjak area. As such, Izmail is a center of the food processing industry and a popular regional tourist destination. It is also a base of the Ukrainian Navy and the Ukrainian Sea Guard units operating on the river. The World Wildlife Fund's Isles of Izmail Regional Landscape Park is located nearby. Population: 69,932 (2022 estimate).

== History ==
The fortress of Izmail, then known as Licovrissi in greek, was built by Genoese merchants in the 12th century. It belonged for a short period of time to Wallachia (14th century) – as the territory north of the Danube was one of the possessions of the Basarabs (later the land being named after them, Bessarabia). The town was first mentioned with the name Ismailiye, derived from the name of the Ottoman grand vizier Ayaşlı Ismail Pasha. The city was founded by a decree of Sultan Murad III, with a deed where he made the land around the crossing point, property of Habeshi Mehmed Agha which was the head of his harem. The city that Mehmed Agha founded was called after him Mehmedabad and in its significance it was even compared to Baghdad - although the scale, of course, is not the same.

From the end of the 14th century, Izmail was under the rule of Moldavia. In 1484, the Ottoman state conquered the territory, which became from that moment an Ottoman protectorate (under direct rule from 1538). Since the early 16th century it was the main Ottoman fortress in the Budjak region. In 1569 Sultan Selim II settled Izmail with his Nogai subjects, originally from the North Caucasus. In 1609 the fortress was destroyed by Cossacks.

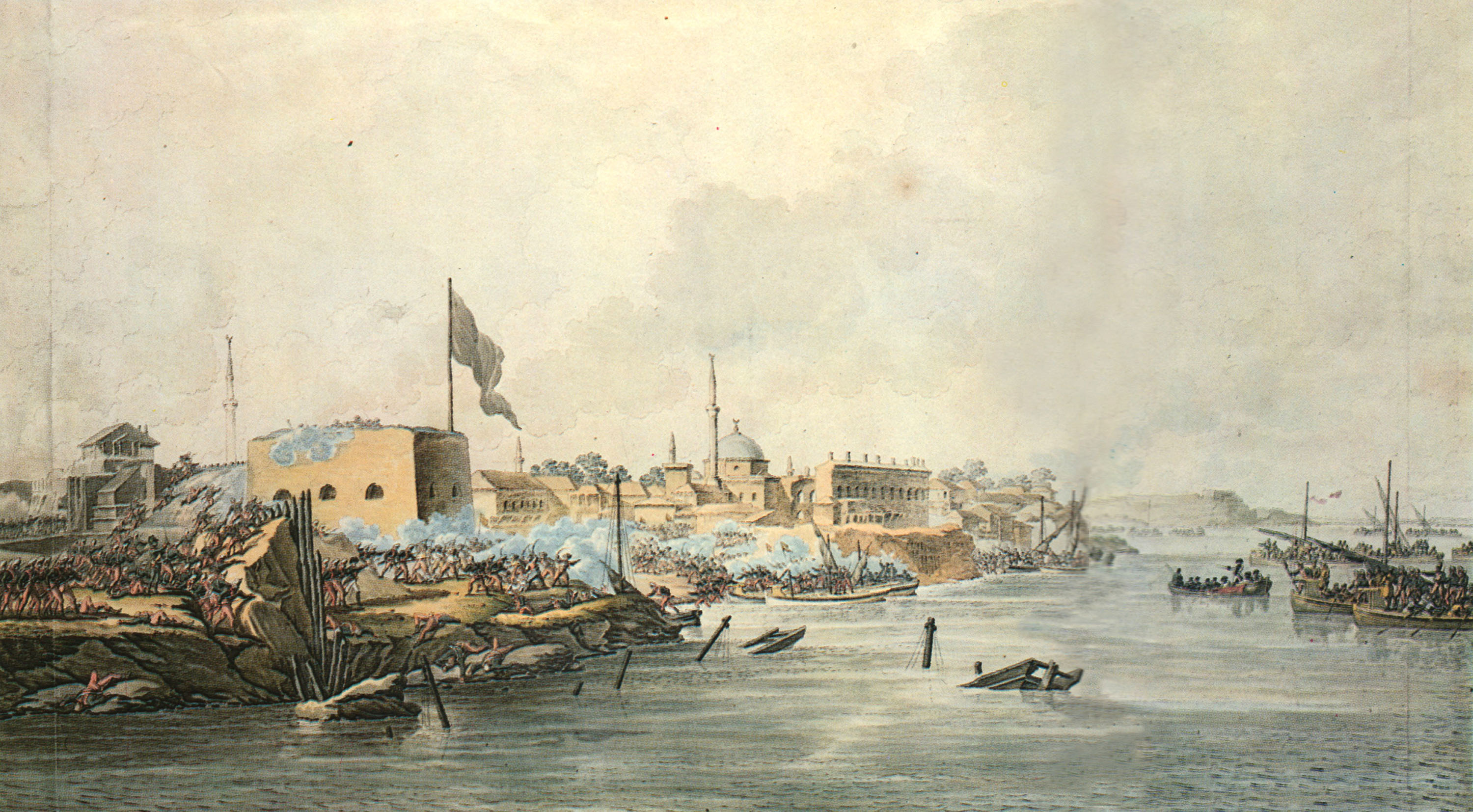
The 1790 siege of Izmail; by Samuil Schiflar.

After Russian general Nicholas Repnin took the fortress of Izmail in 1770, it was heavily refortified by the Turks, so as never to be captured again. The Sultan boasted that the fortress was impregnable, but during the Russo-Turkish War of 1787–1792 the Russian Army commander Alexander Suvorov successfully stormed it on 22 December 1790. Ottoman forces inside the fortress had the orders to stand their ground to the end, haughtily declining the Russian ultimatum. The defeat was seen as a catastrophe in the Ottoman Empire, while in Russia it was glorified in the country's first national anthem, Let the thunder of victory sound!.

Suvorov "announced the capture of Ismail in 1791 to the Tsarina Catherine in a doggerel couplet, after the assault had been pressed from house to house, room to room, and nearly every Muslim man, woman and child in the city had been killed in three days of uncontrolled massacre, 40,000 Turks dead, a few hundred taken into captivity. For all his bluffness, Suvorov later told an English traveler that when the massacre was over he went back to his tent and wept."

At the end of the war, Izmail was returned to the Ottoman Empire, but Russian forces took it for the third time on 14 September 1809. After it was ceded to Russia with the rest of Bessarabia by the 1812 Treaty of Bucharest, the town was rebuilt thoroughly. The Intercession Cathedral (1822–36), the churches of Nativity (1823), St. Nicholas (1833) and several others date back to that time. Izmail's oldest building is the small Turkish mosque, erected either in the 15th or 16th centuries, converted into a church in 1810 and currently housing a museum dedicated to the 1790 storming of Izmail.

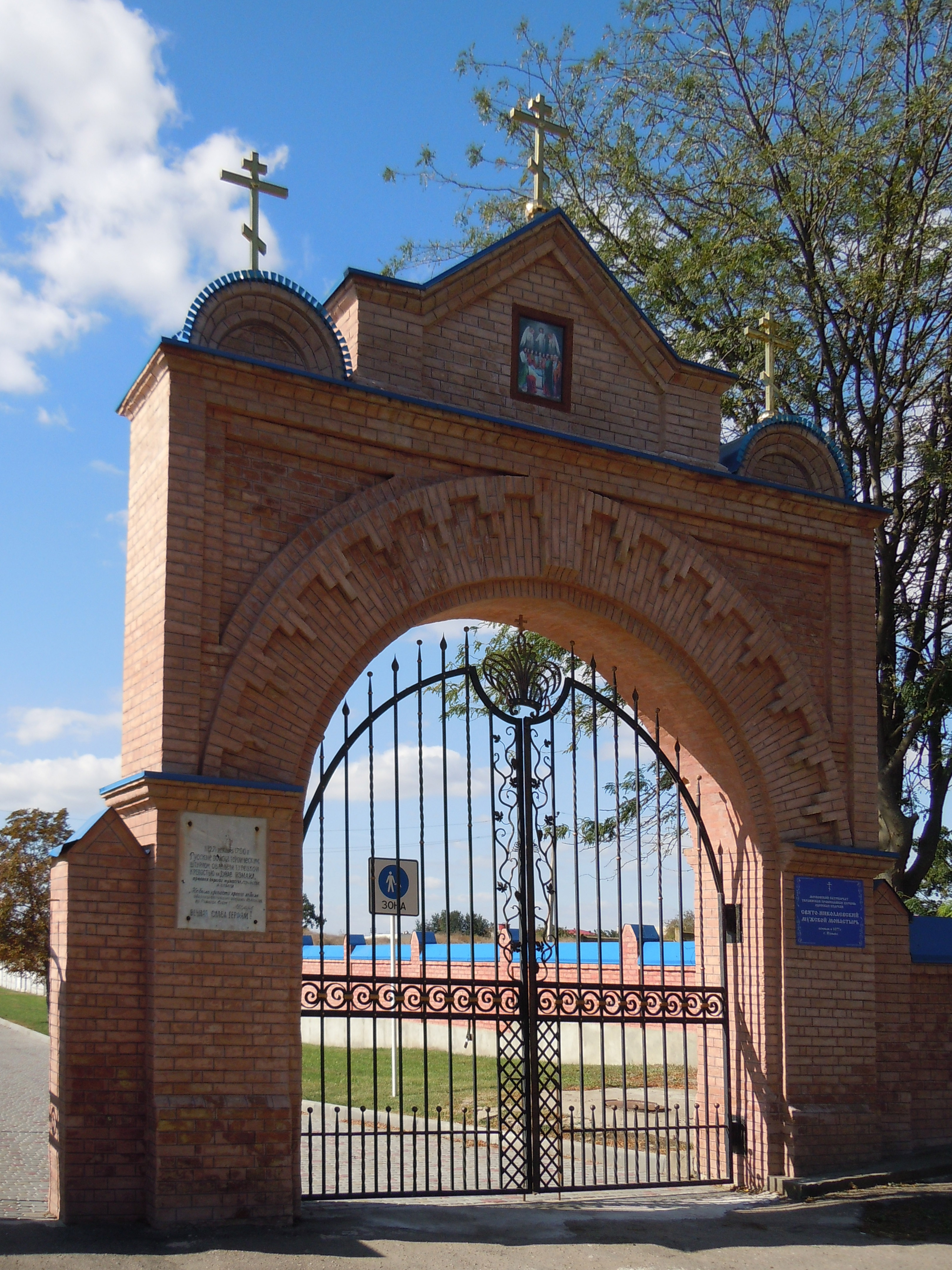
The entrance to the territory of the Izmail Fortress

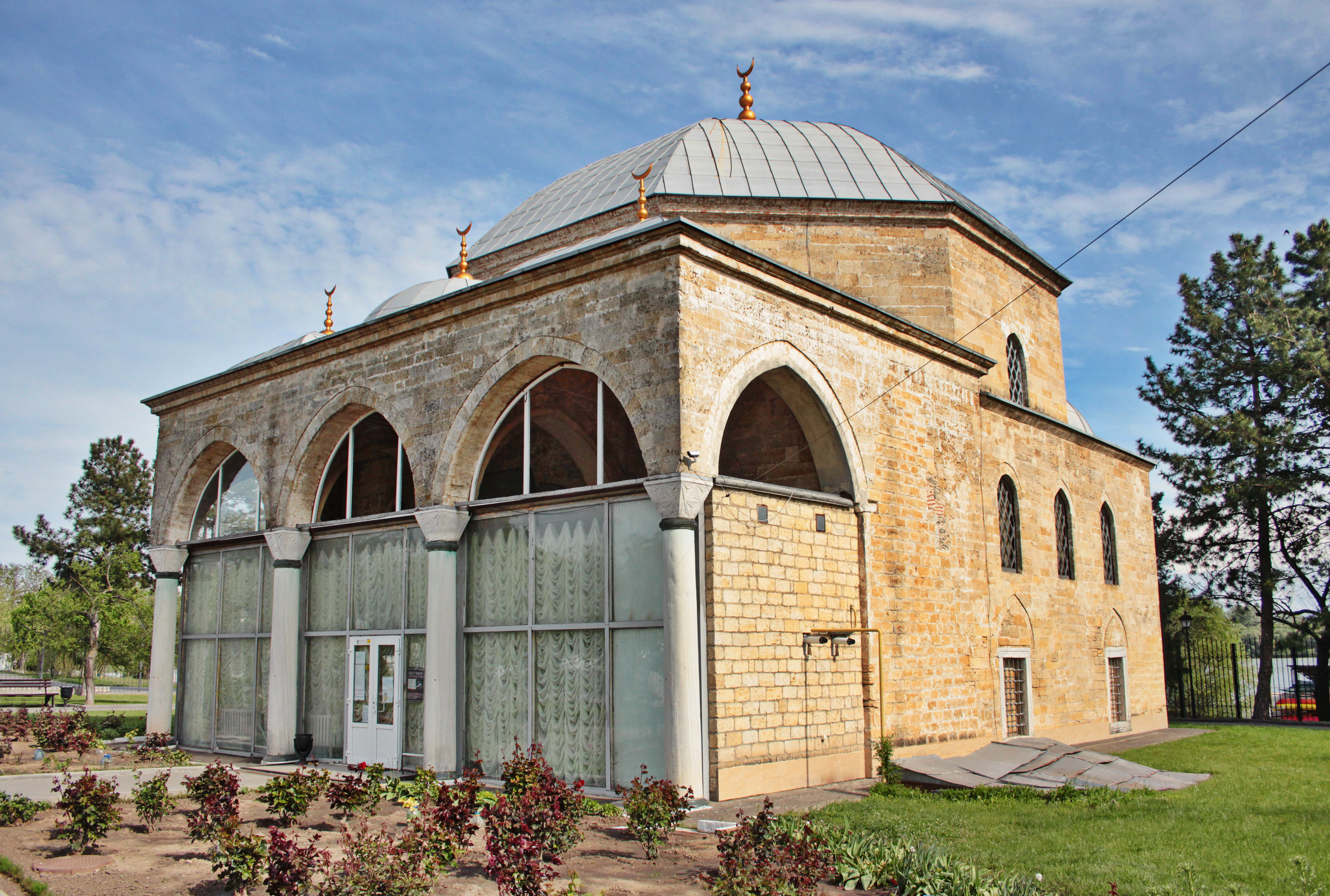
Small Mosque

After Russia lost the Crimean War, the town returned to the Principality of Moldavia, which would soon become part of the Romanian Principalities. Russia gained control of Izmail again after the Russo-Turkish War of 1877–1878. With the breakup of the Russian Empire in 1917 and in the aftermath of World War I, the city was occupied by the Romanian Army on 22 January 1918, after a skirmish with troops of the Danube flotilla. Later that year, the Sfatul Țării of Chișinău, which claimed to be the representative of the whole of Bessarabia, voted to formally unite the region with Romania. This union was recognized by the United Kingdom, France and Italy in the Treaty of Paris, but not by the Soviet Union which had territorial claims over Bessarabia.

In 1940, and again during World War II, it was occupied by the Soviet Red Army and included (August 1940, as a result of Molotov–Ribbentrop Pact ) in the Ukrainian SSR; the region was occupied in 1941 by the Romanian Army participating in Operation Barbarossa. The 678 Jews recorded in the 1 September 1941 Romanian census were deported to Transnistria by the Romanian authorities in 1941, where a large majority of them died. Izmail was recaptured by the Soviets in 1944. During the Soviet period following World War II, many Russians and Ukrainians migrated to the town, gradually changing its ethnic composition. Izmail Oblast was formed in 1940, and the town remained its administrative center until the oblast was merged to Odesa Oblast in 1954.

Since 24 August 1991, Izmail has been part of independent Ukraine. Until 18 July 2020, it was incorporated as a city of oblast significance and served as the administrative center of Izmail Raion though it did not belong to the raion. In July 2020, as part of the administrative reform of Ukraine, which reduced the number of raions of Odesa Oblast to seven, the city of Izmail was merged into Izmail Raion.

Following the full-scale Russian invasion of Ukraine, the monument to Alexander Suvorov in Izmail's city centre was placed in temporary storage on 12 November 2022, until city deputies decide where it will be kept permanently. On 27 September 2024, Izmail suffered a Russian missile and drone attack.

== Geography ==
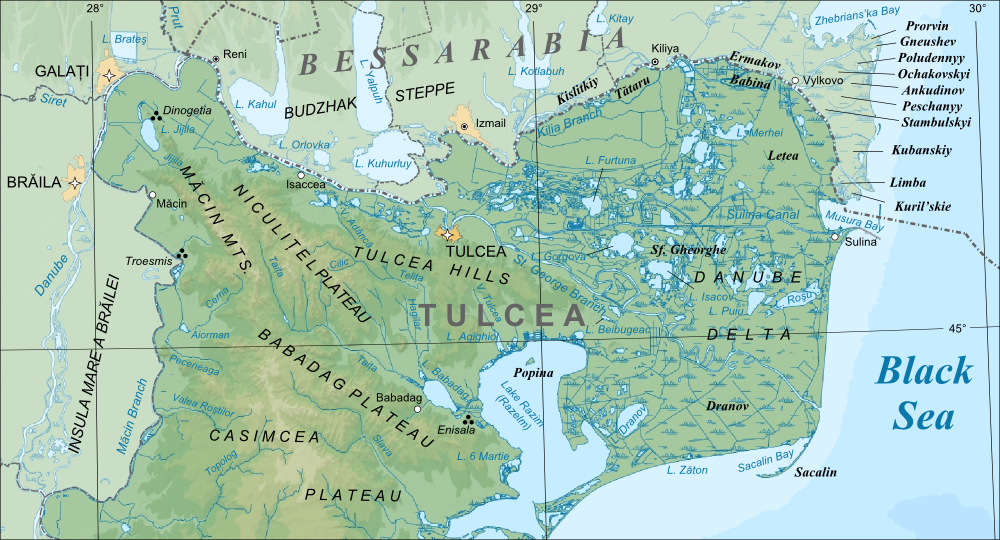
Danube Delta

=== Location ===
The city is located in the Danube Delta on the left-bank of its Chilia branch. On the opposite side of the river belongs to Romania. The city is surrounded by several lakes among which are Yalpuh, Kuhurluy, Kotlabuh and many smaller ones.

The city is located in area known as the Budjak steppe which is a southern portion of Bessarabia. The opposite bank of Danube elevates as the Tulcea Hills. The distance to the Black Sea is 80 kilometers.

=== Climate ===
Under the Köppen climate classification, Izmail falls within either a hot-summer humid continental climate (Dfa) if the 0 °C (32 °F) isotherm is used or a humid subtropical climate (Cfa) if the −3 °C (27 °F) isotherm is used. Izmail experiences four distinct seasons and generous precipitation year-round, typical for the inland South. Summers are hot and humid, with temperatures somewhat moderated by the city's elevation. Winters are cool but variable, with an average of 48 freezing days per year.

Climate data for Izmail (1991–2020, extremes 1886–present)
Month	Jan	Feb	Mar	Apr	May	Jun	Jul	Aug	Sep	Oct	Nov	Dec	Year
Record high °C (°F)	18.4 (65.1)	23.0 (73.4)	27.6 (81.7)	31.2 (88.2)	35.1 (95.2)	36.7 (98.1)	40.7 (105.3)	39.1 (102.4)	35.9 (96.6)	32.2 (90.0)	25.5 (77.9)	19.9 (67.8)	40.7 (105.3)
Mean daily maximum °C (°F)	3.1 (37.6)	5.5 (41.9)	10.7 (51.3)	17.1 (62.8)	23.0 (73.4)	27.3 (81.1)	29.9 (85.8)	30.0 (86.0)	24.2 (75.6)	17.5 (63.5)	10.6 (51.1)	4.8 (40.6)	17.0 (62.6)
Daily mean °C (°F)	−0.5 (31.1)	1.2 (34.2)	5.5 (41.9)	11.2 (52.2)	16.9 (62.4)	21.3 (70.3)	23.7 (74.7)	23.3 (73.9)	17.9 (64.2)	12.0 (53.6)	6.4 (43.5)	1.1 (34.0)	11.7 (53.1)
Mean daily minimum °C (°F)	−3.7 (25.3)	−2.5 (27.5)	1.2 (34.2)	5.8 (42.4)	11.1 (52.0)	15.3 (59.5)	17.5 (63.5)	17.1 (62.8)	12.3 (54.1)	7.3 (45.1)	2.7 (36.9)	−2.1 (28.2)	6.8 (44.2)
Record low °C (°F)	−25.4 (−13.7)	−24.1 (−11.4)	−18.3 (−0.9)	−5.3 (22.5)	−0.2 (31.6)	5.5 (41.9)	8.2 (46.8)	3.6 (38.5)	−3.3 (26.1)	−8.9 (16.0)	−17.6 (0.3)	−20.8 (−5.4)	−25.4 (−13.7)
Average precipitation mm (inches)	32 (1.3)	26 (1.0)	29 (1.1)	33 (1.3)	43 (1.7)	59 (2.3)	46 (1.8)	32 (1.3)	36 (1.4)	39 (1.5)	36 (1.4)	37 (1.5)	448 (17.6)
Average precipitation days (≥ 1.0 mm)	5.3	4.9	4.8	5.5	6.6	6.1	4.8	4.1	4.2	4.6	4.9	5.9	61.7
Average relative humidity (%)	80.4	76.6	71.3	67.8	66.9	64.7	62.0	60.6	66.9	75.0	80.8	81.7	71.2
Mean monthly sunshine hours	84	110	157	207	281	306	336	309	234	167	92	76	2,359
Source 1: Pogoda.ru
Source 2: NOAA (precipitation, humidity, and sun 1991–2020)

== Demographics ==
Historical populations
Year	Pop.	±%
1920	37,000	—
1956	43,000	+16.2%
2001	85,098	+97.9%
2008	77,076	−9.4%
2011	75,581	−1.9%
2022	69,932	−7.5%
2025	69,182	−1.1%

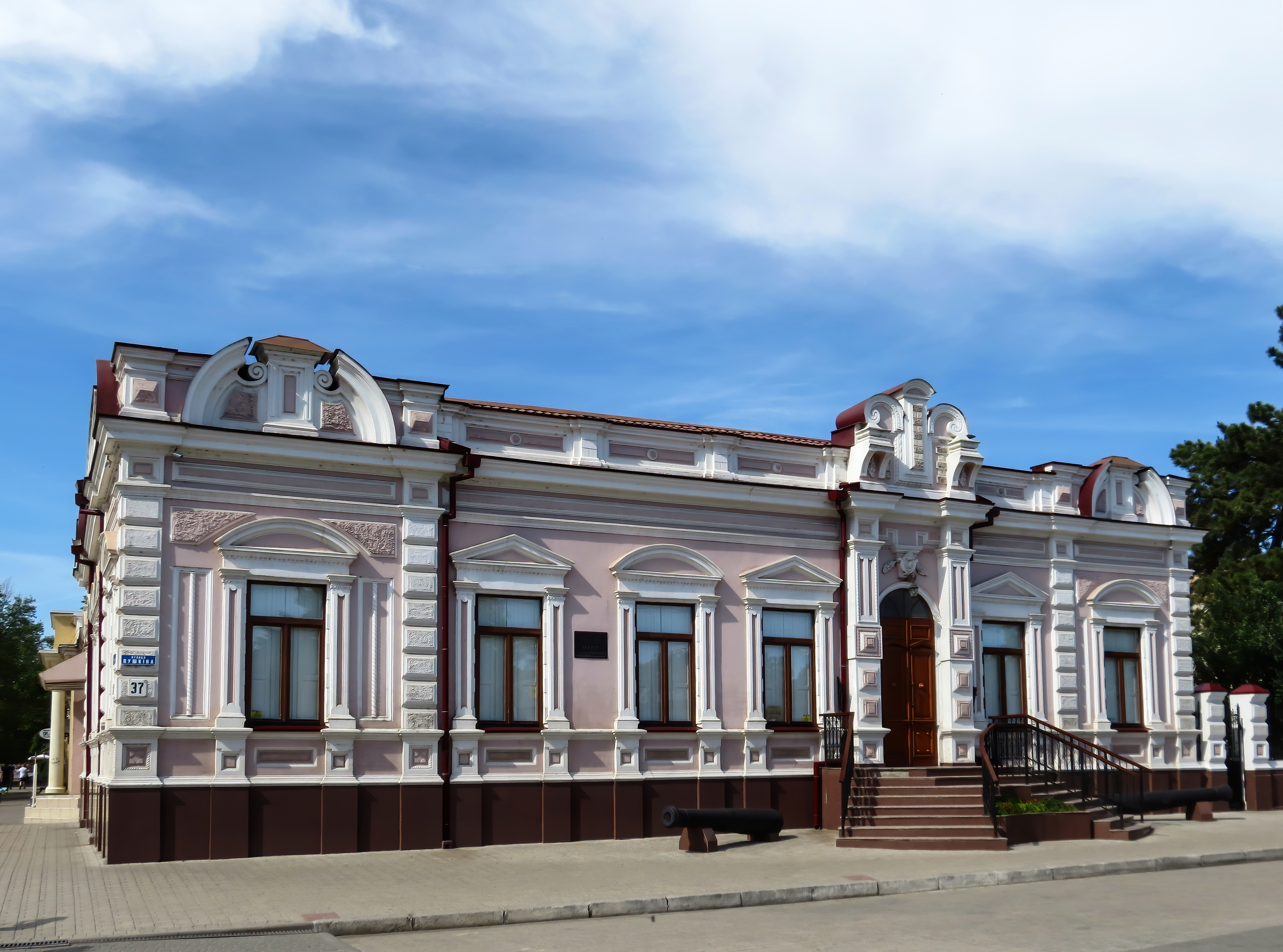
Suvorov Museum

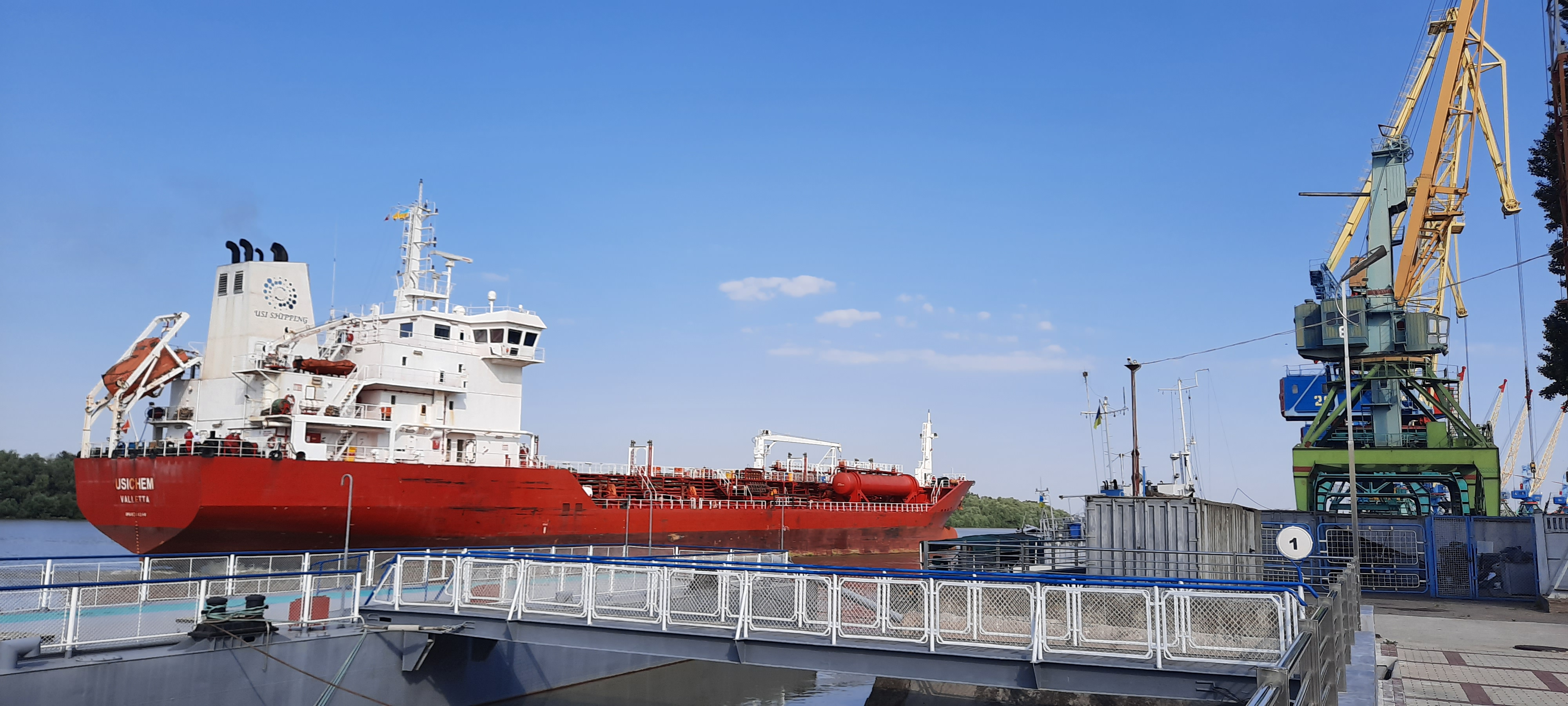
Port of Izmail

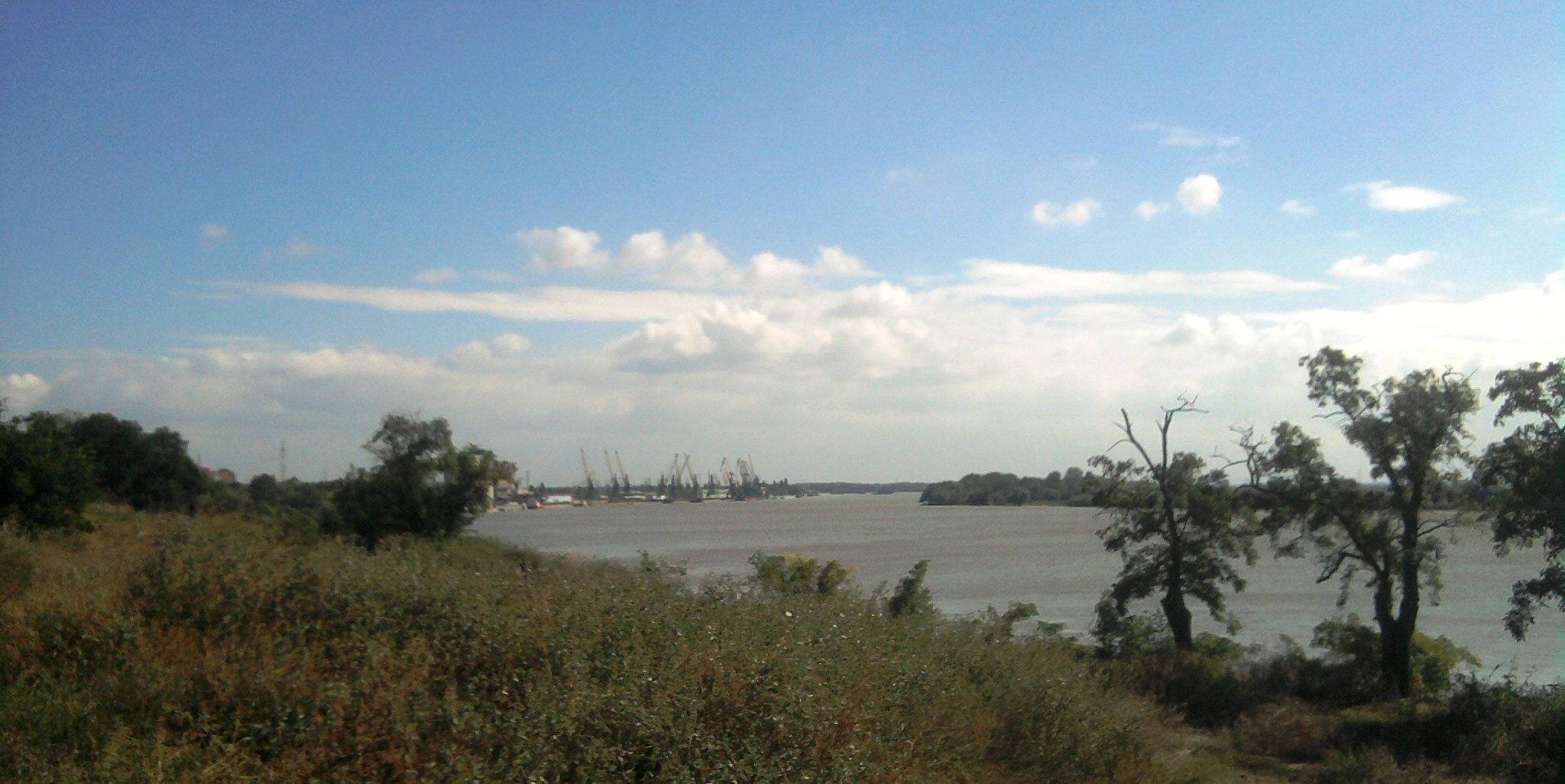
Danube River

Before 1920, the population of Izmail was estimated at 37,000. During that time, approximately 11,000 of the population were Jewish, 8,000 Romanians and 6,000 Germans. Additional members of the population were Russians, Bulgarians, Turks and Cossacks.

The city of Izmail, the largest city of Ukrainian southern Bessarabia, which was also the same as the Izmail urban hromada, had 85,098 inhabitants in 2001, including 32,500 who identified themselves as ethnic Ukrainians (38.2%), 37,166 as ethnic Russians (43.67%), 8,609 as Bulgarians (10.1%), 3,670 as Moldovans (4.31%), 788 as Gagauz (2.42%) and 31 as Romanians (0.04%). In 2001, the population of the city of Izmail included 15,353 Ukrainian-speakers (18.04%), 1,554 Romanian speakers (1.83%), including 1,538 self-identified Romanian-speakers (1.81%) and 16 self-identified Romanian-speakers (0.02%), 3,898 Bulgarian-speakers (4.58%), 63,180 Russian-speakers (74.24%), and 327 Gagauz-speakers (0.38%). Most ethnic Moldovans, Ukrainians, Bulgarians and Gagauz in the city were Russian-speakers in 2001. Izmail Raion, in its boundaries at that time, and excluding the city of Izmail, had 54,692 inhabitants in 2001, including 15,798 who identified themselves as ethnic Ukrainians (28.89%), 15,083 as Moldovans (27.58%), 14,072 as Bulgarians (25.73%), 8,870 as Russians (16.22%), 230 as Gagauz (0.42%) and 34 as Romanians (0.06%). Izmail Raion, within its boundaries at that time, had 54,692 inhabitants in 2001, including 26.34% Ukrainian-speakers, 26.21% Romanian-speakers, 21.56% Russian-speakers, 24.88% Bulgarian-speaking and 0.26% Gagauz-speaking. The population also consists of many other nationalities: Greeks, Jews, Armenians, etc. - 75 nationalities in total.

== Economy ==
Izmail is an important port, as well as a centre of ship repairment and canned foods production.

== Notable people ==
- Ioan Chirilă, Romanian writer and sports journalist
- Galina Chistyakova, Soviet, Russian, and later Slovakian athlete, winner of the long jump bronze medal at the 1988 Summer Olympics
- Leonid Dimov (1926–1987), Romanian poet
- Olena Hovorova, Ukrainian athlete, winner of the triple jump bronze medal at the 2000 Summer Olympics
- Wiktor Kemula, Polish chemist, electrochemist, and polarographist, developer of the hanging mercury drop electrode (HMDE)
- Bohdan Krotevych (born 1993), Ukrainian military officer and participant of the Russo-Ukrainian War
- Ruslan Maynov, Bulgarian actor and musician
- Gavriil Musicescu, Romanian composer
- Serghei Nicolau (1905–1999), Russian-Romanian communist espionage chief and a Securitate general
- Sergiu Sarchizov, Romanian composer and conductor
- Sholom Schwartzbard, Jewish anarchist, assassin of Symon Petliura
- Ivan Shishman, Bulgarian artist
- Vadim Yuryevich Tsarev – Russian philosopher, publicist, author of television films, Member of the Union of writers of Russia
- Artur Văitoianu, Romanian general, Army commander during World War I; Prime Minister

== Gallery ==
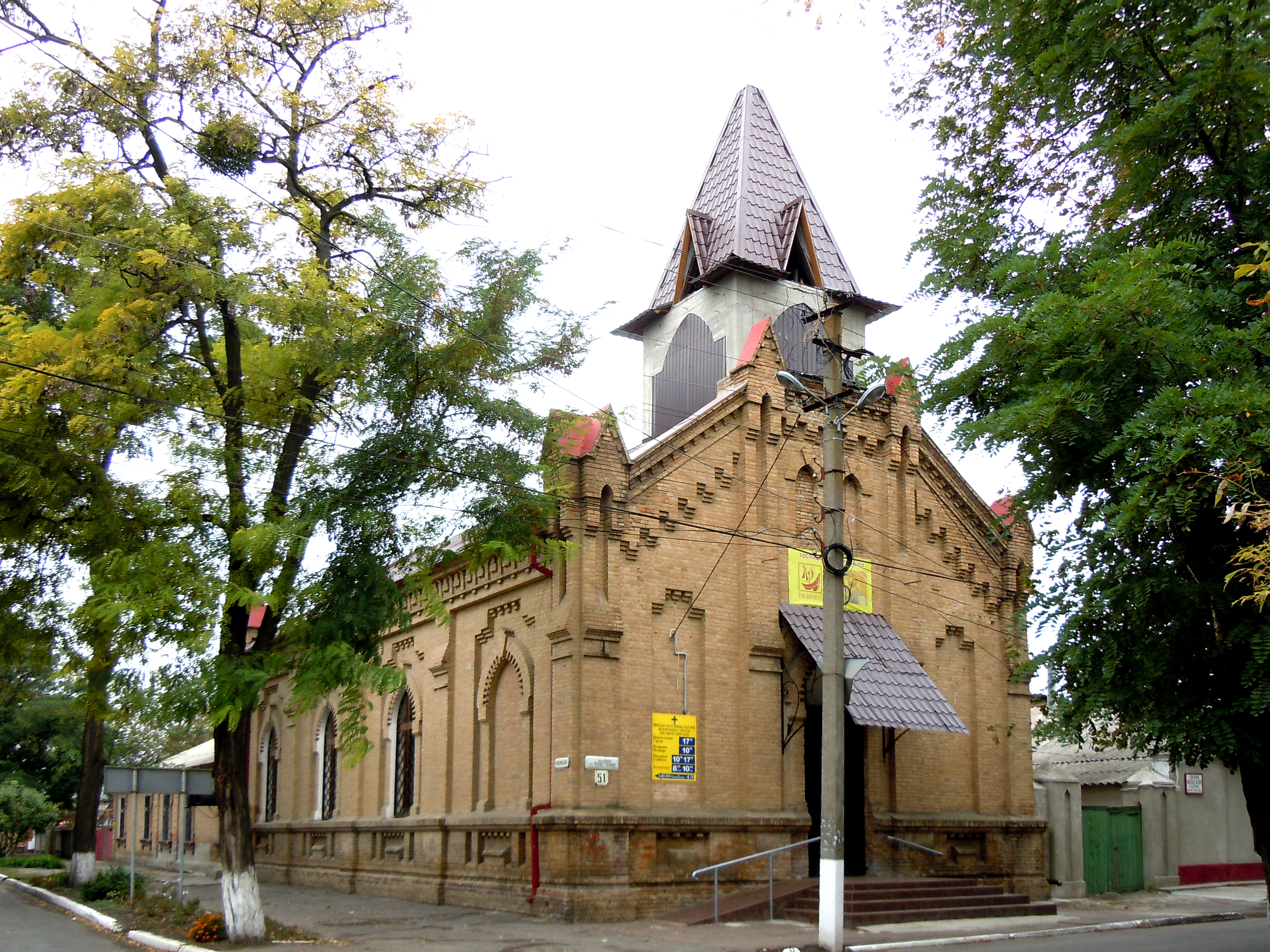
Immaculate Conception church

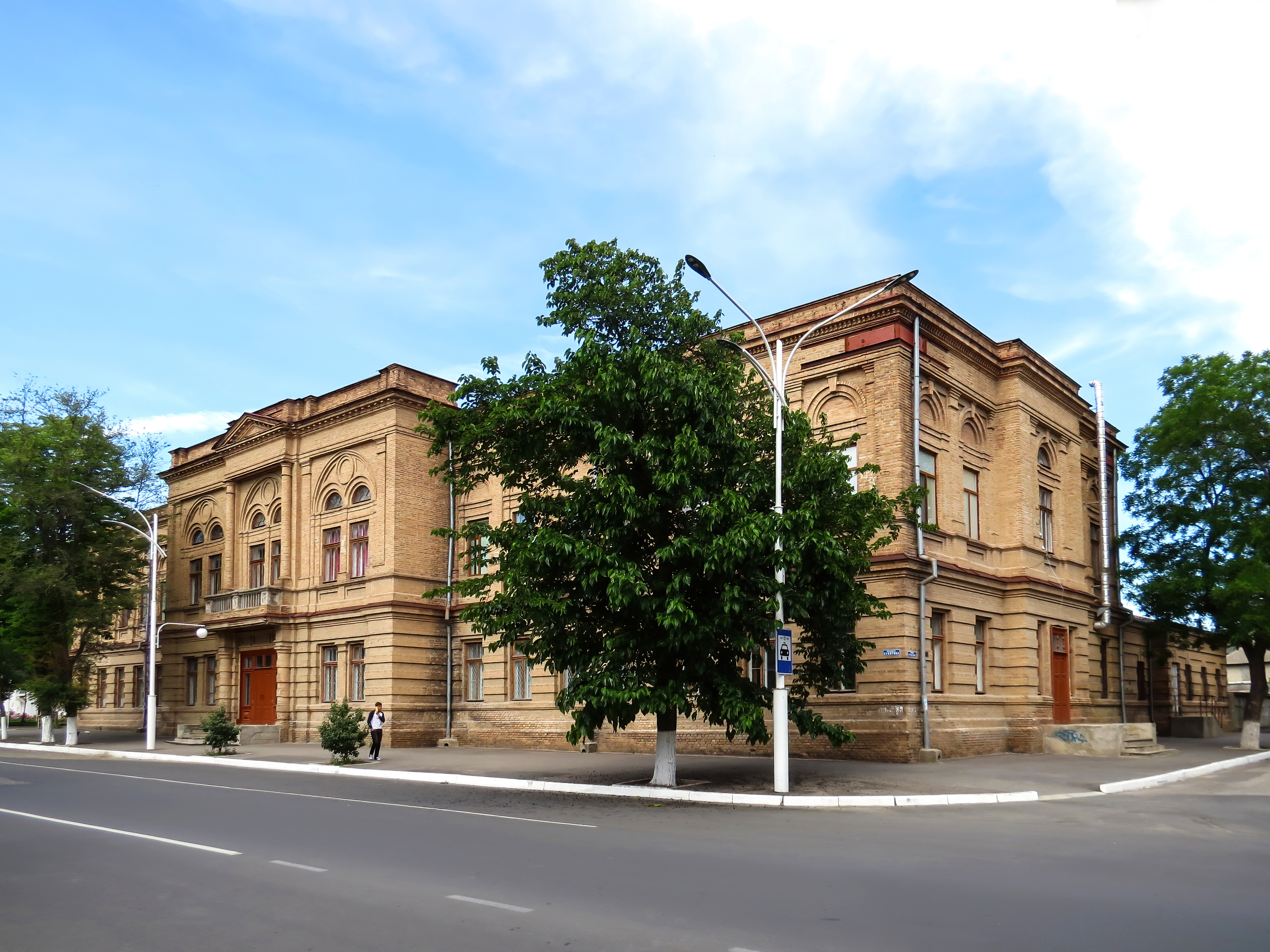
Old lycaeum building

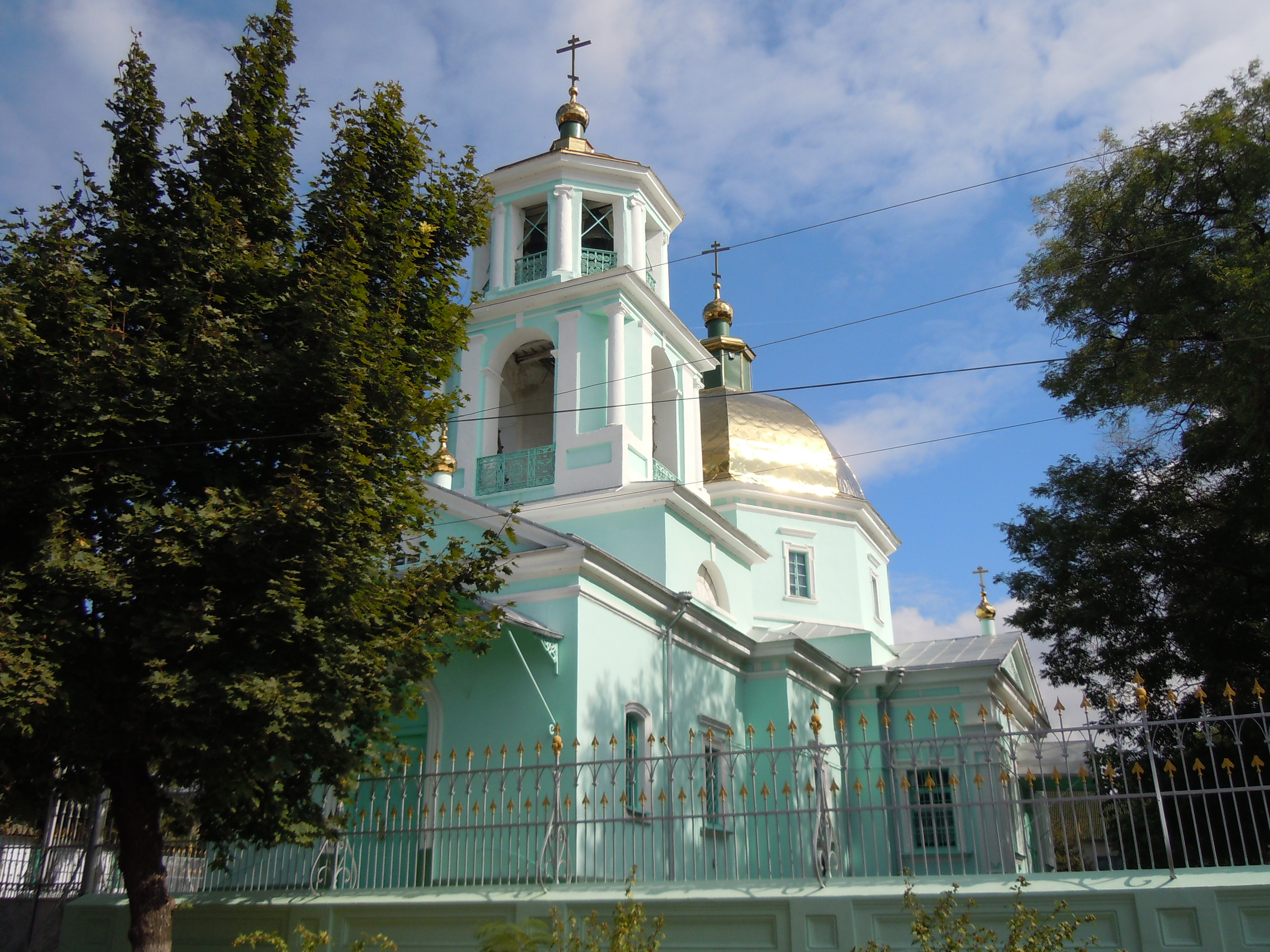
Old-believers St. Nicholas Church

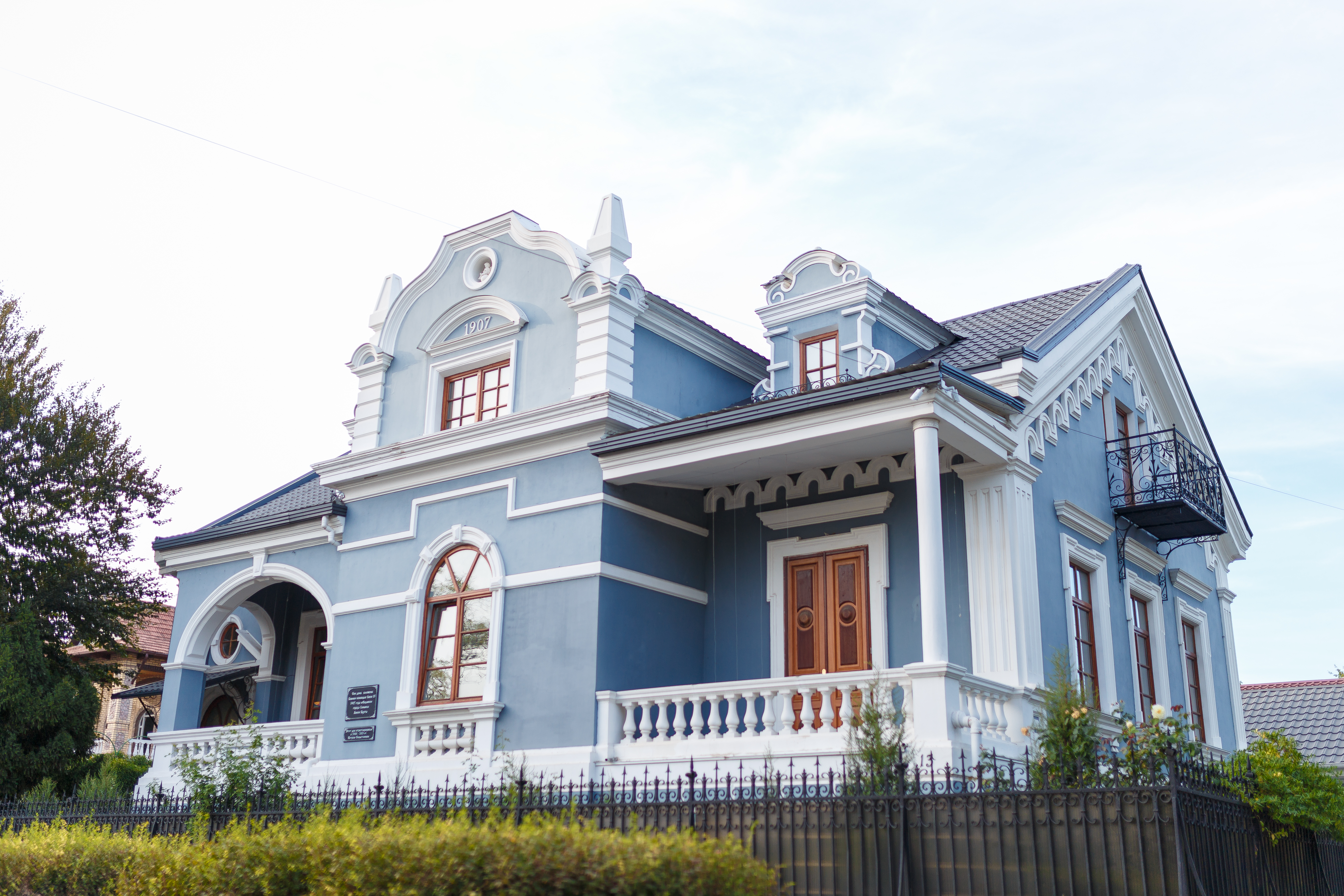
Old dwelling house

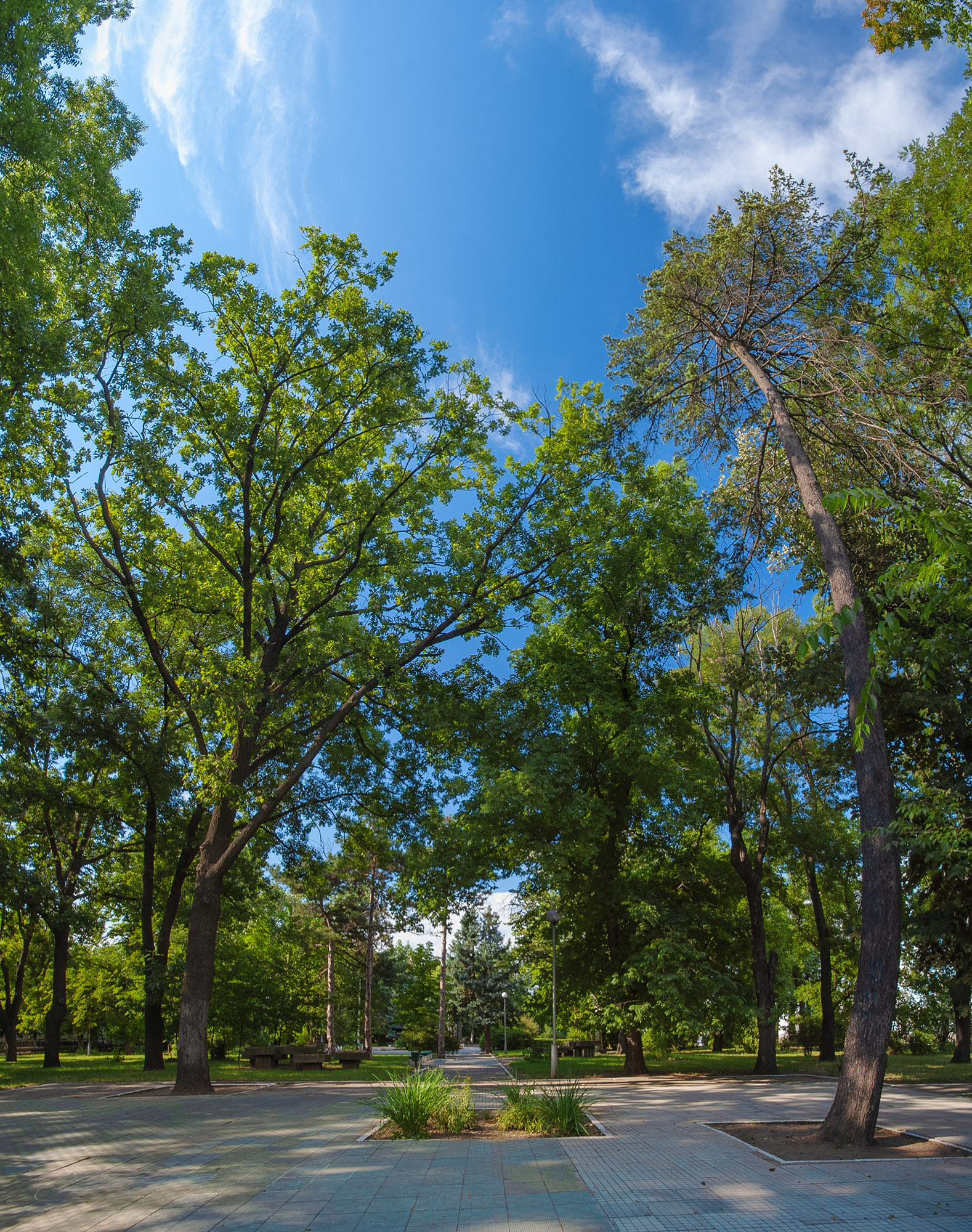
Izmail city garden

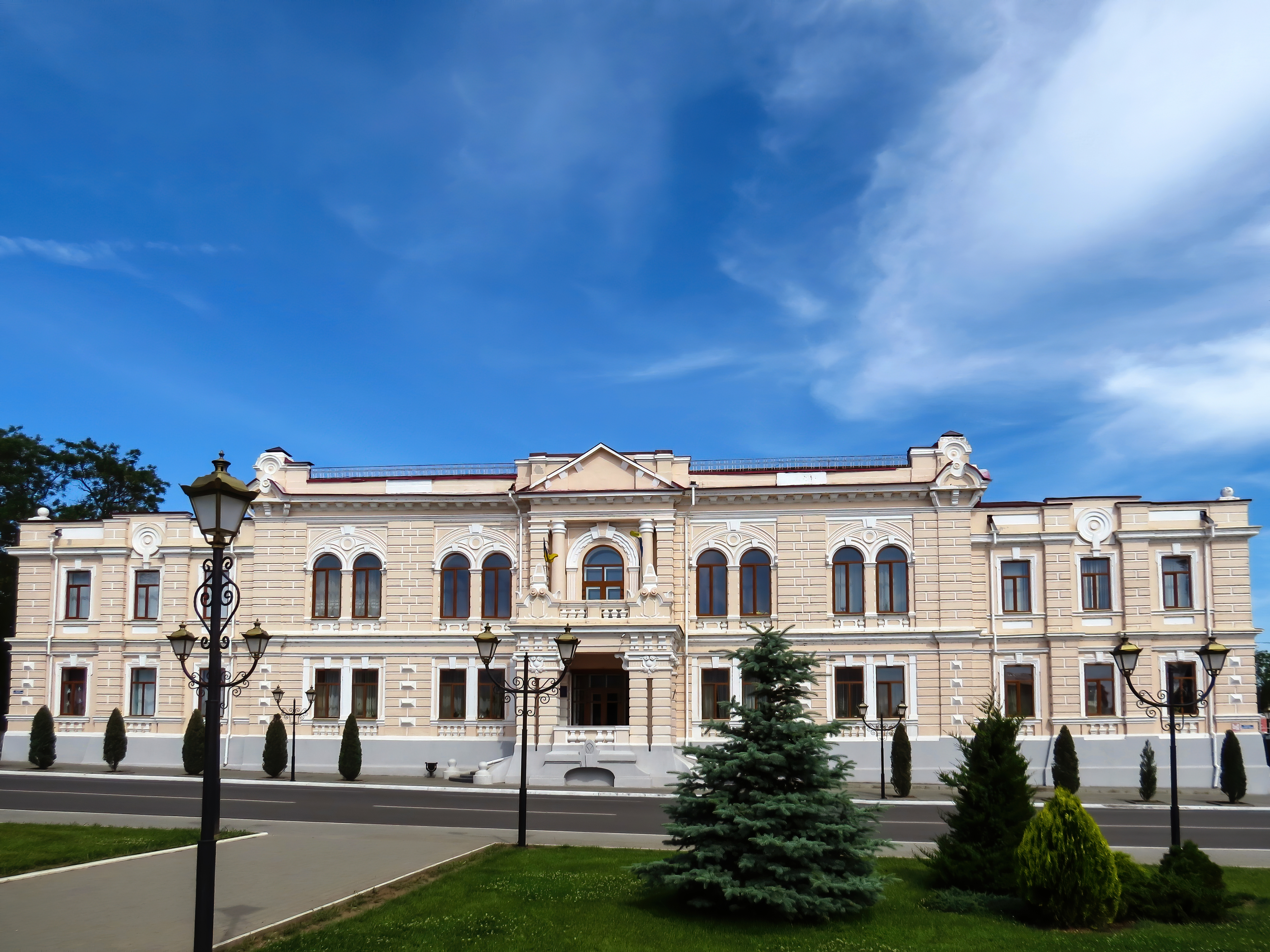
Tulchianov House

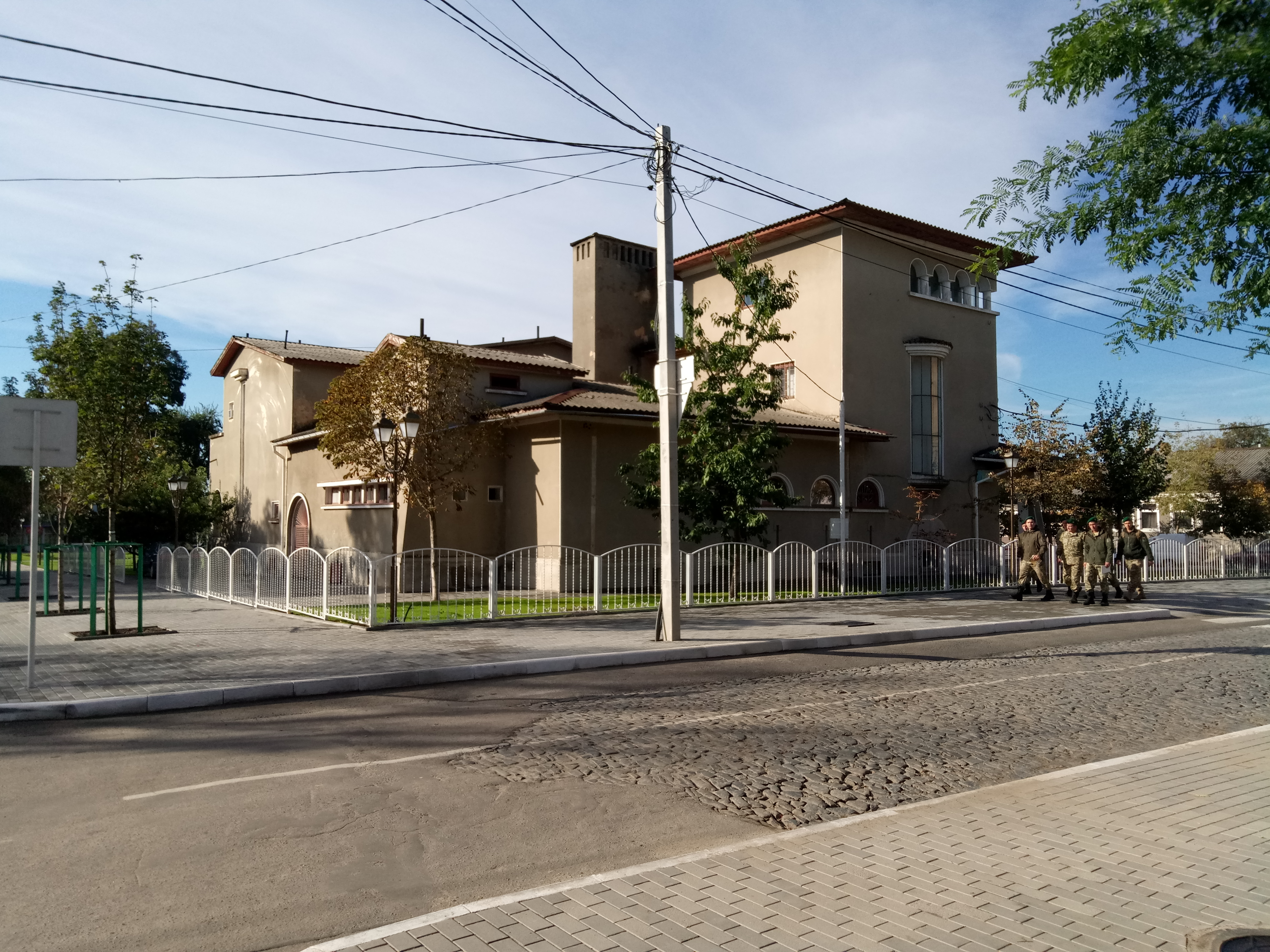
Old hospital

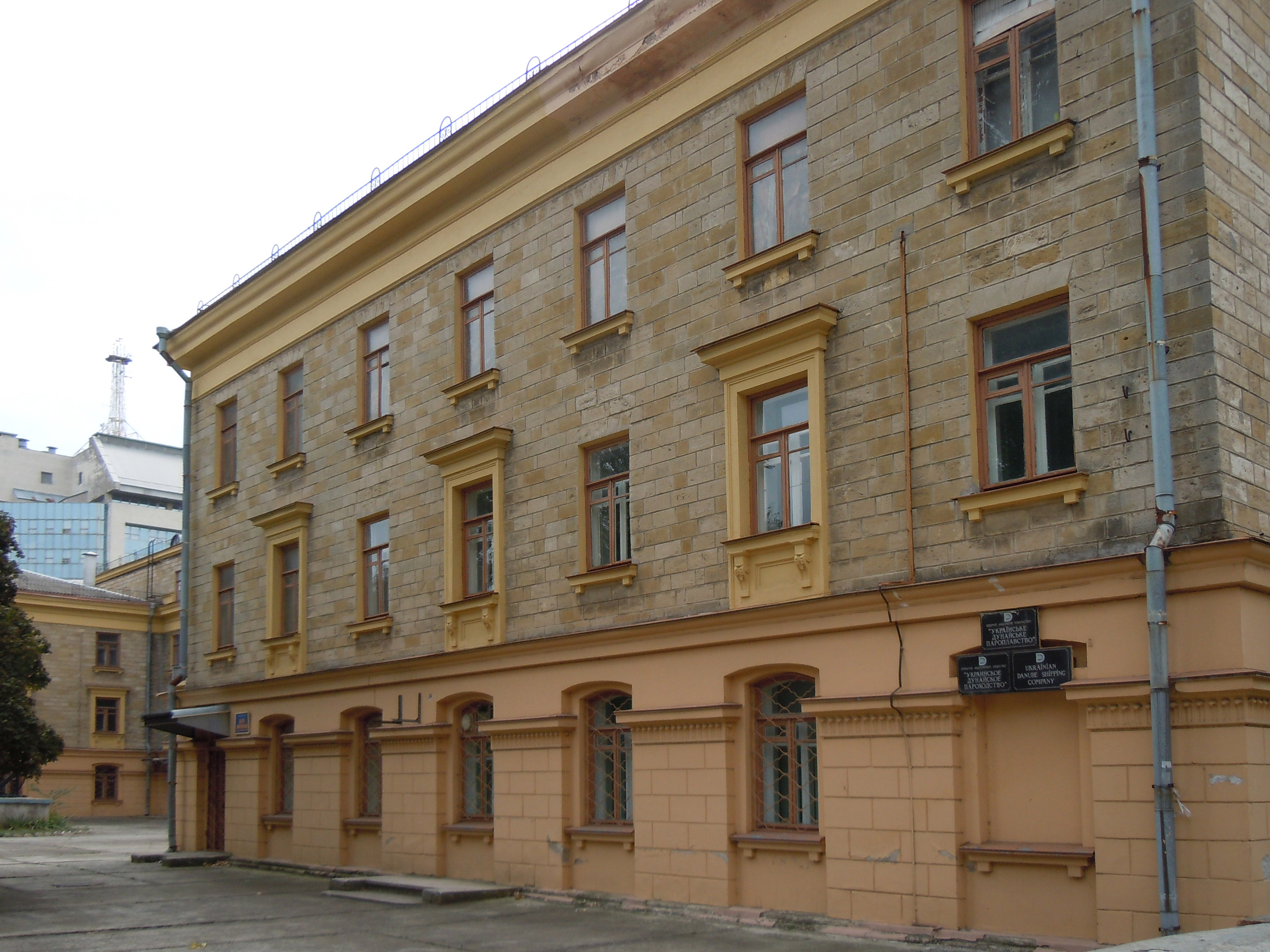
Sailors' inn

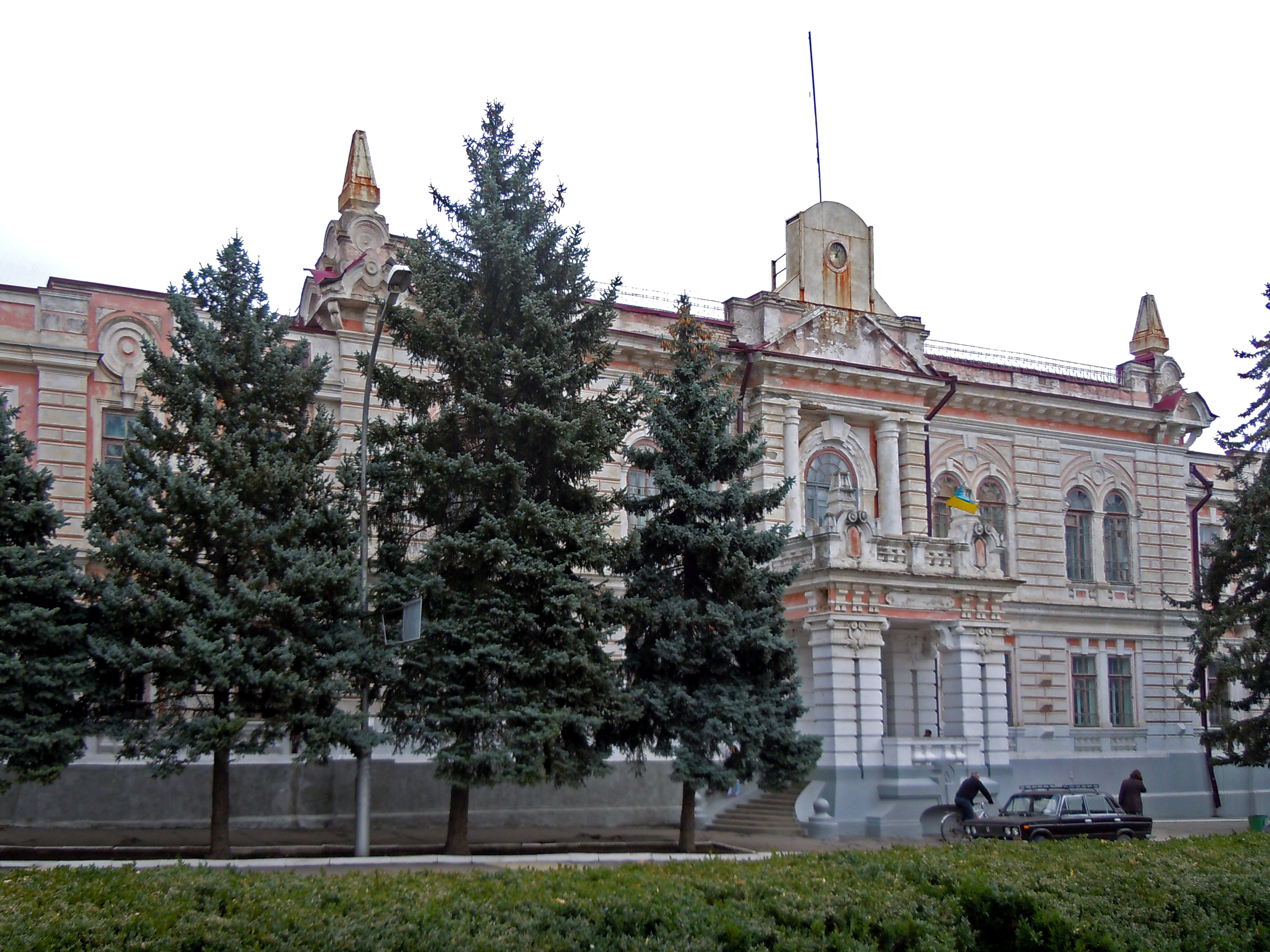
Old city hall building

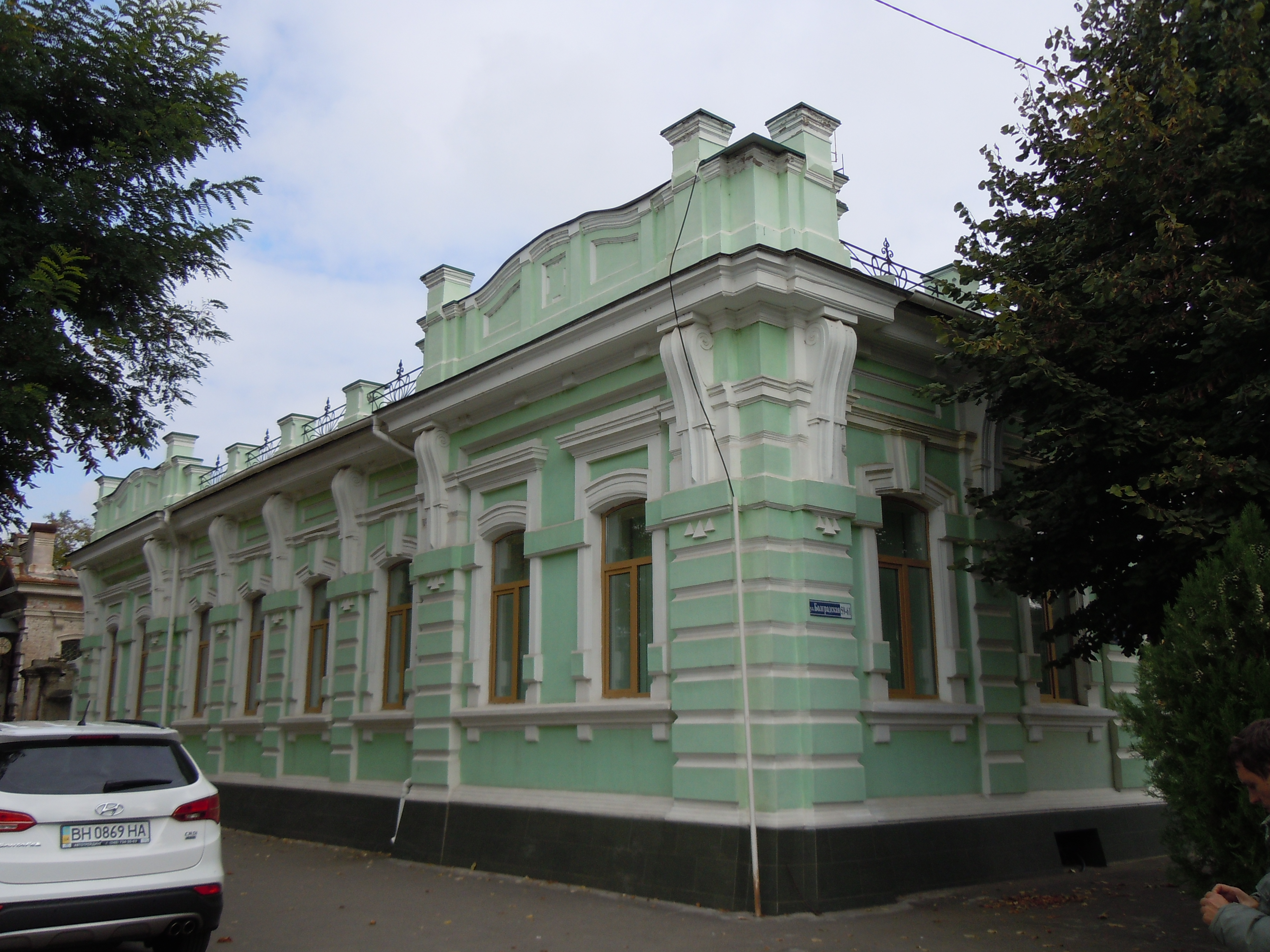
Eparchial office building

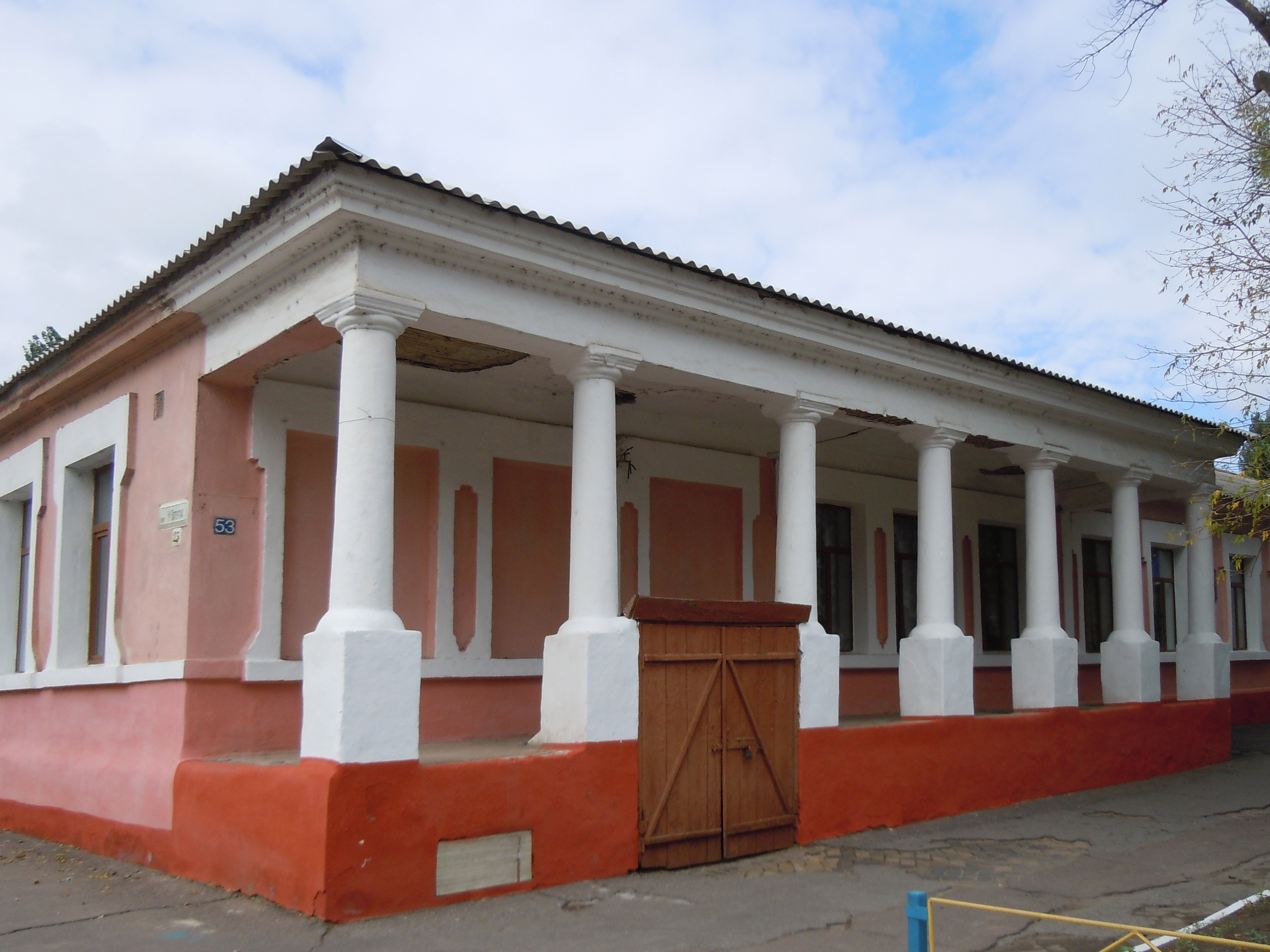
Old trade gallery

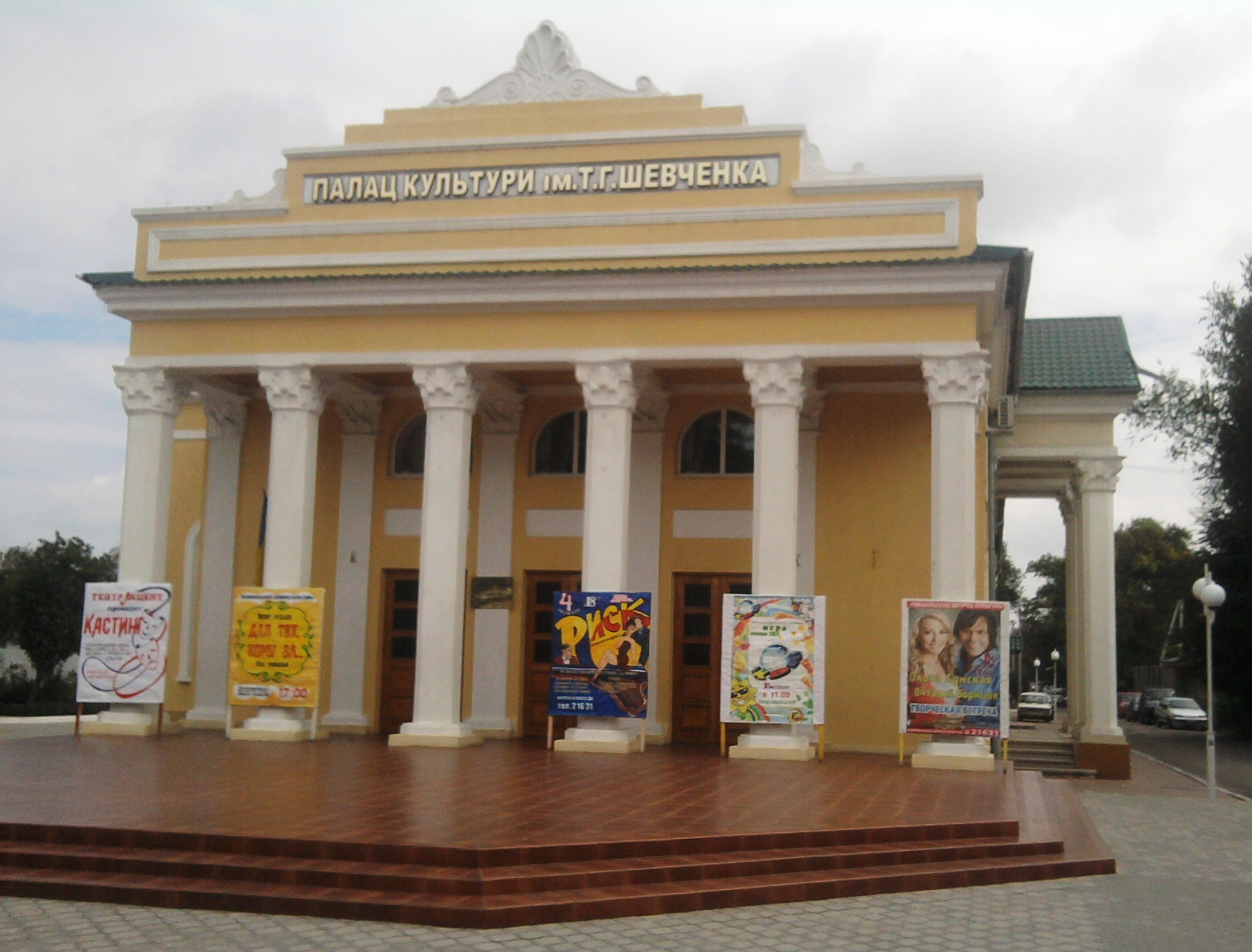
Shevchenko Palace of Culture

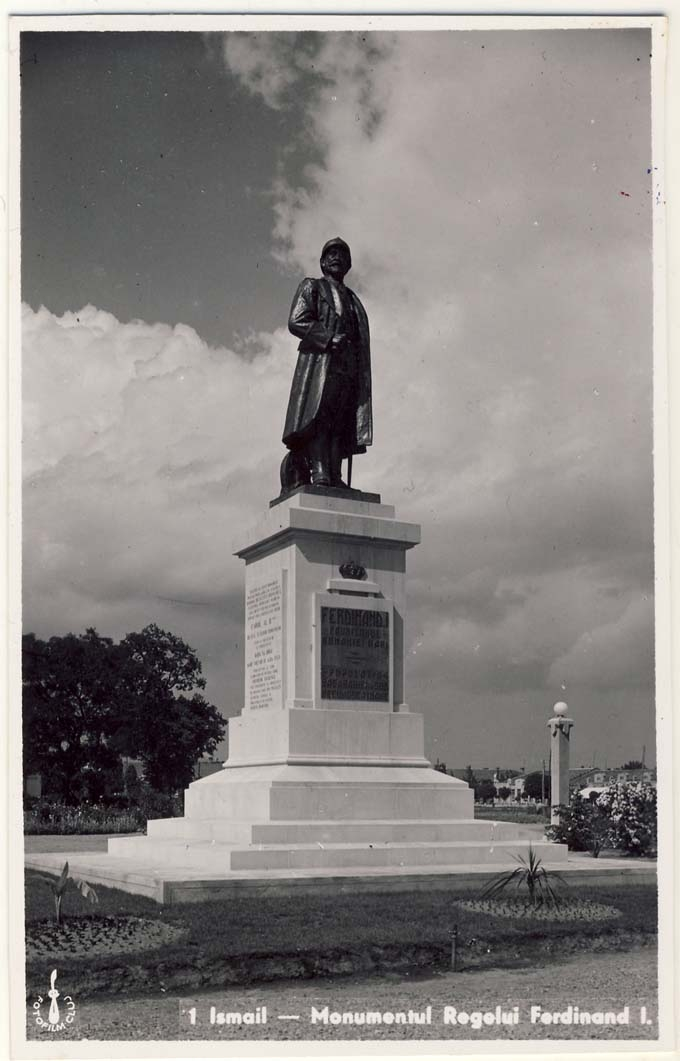
Statue of King Ferdinand I of Romania during the interwar period, demolished by the Soviet authorities
