= Malorossian Cossacks =

Hostless Russian Cossacks (1782–1917)

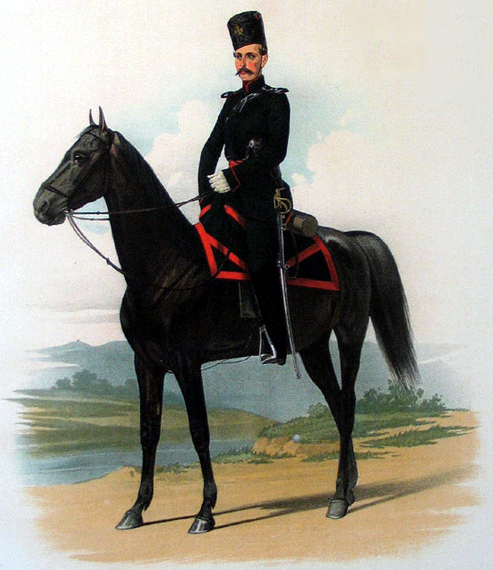
Piratsky K. K. Ober-officer of the Little Russian Cavalry Cossack Regiments, 1855

The Malorossian Cossacks (Ukrainian: Малоросійські козаки, Russian: Малороссийские казаки, lit. 'Little Russian Cossacks') were hostless Cossacks who lived primarily in the Chernigov and Poltava governorates of the Russian Empire from 1782 to 1917, following the liquidation of the Hetmanate's administrative system in Left-bank Ukraine.

== Background ==
After the liquidation of the Cossack Hetmanate in 1764, and its administrative system in 1782 by the Russian Empire, the Russian senate issued a decree under the terms of which registered Cossacks would join the Cossack social estate, allowing them to retain personal freedom, the right to buy and sell land, and the right to attempt to prove noble origin in the future. In order to prove Cossack origin, one had to provide evidence of one's ancestors being in the Cossack register, in the absence of which witness testimony from other Cossacks or nobles was accepted.

== Lifestyle and economic standing ==
Unlike other Cossack groups, the Malorossian Cossacks did not have a host, and as a result they did not have as many obligations and privileges as other Cossacks. The Government of the Russian Empire could not decide what to do with the Malorossian Cossacks. On the one hand, assimilating them into the social estate of state peasants was desirable economically; on the other hand, allowing them to remain as their own separate estate would be useful owing to their military tradition. By the mid 19th century, their social estate was de facto absorbed into the estate of state peasants with a series of privileges such as wine selling and private land ownership, as well as different recruitment standards. The Malorossian Cossacks could also relocate to join a Cossack host with relative ease. As a general rule, they were economically better off than state peasants or serfs and their descendants until the end of their existence.

== Military formations ==
Following the liquidation of the Hetmanate, the Russian Empire mobilized the Cossacks into cavalry units on several occasions: in 1783, 1787, 1812, 1834, 1855, and 1863. Typically, the Russian Empire disbanded these regiments after a few years.

=== List of Malorossian Cossack regiments ===
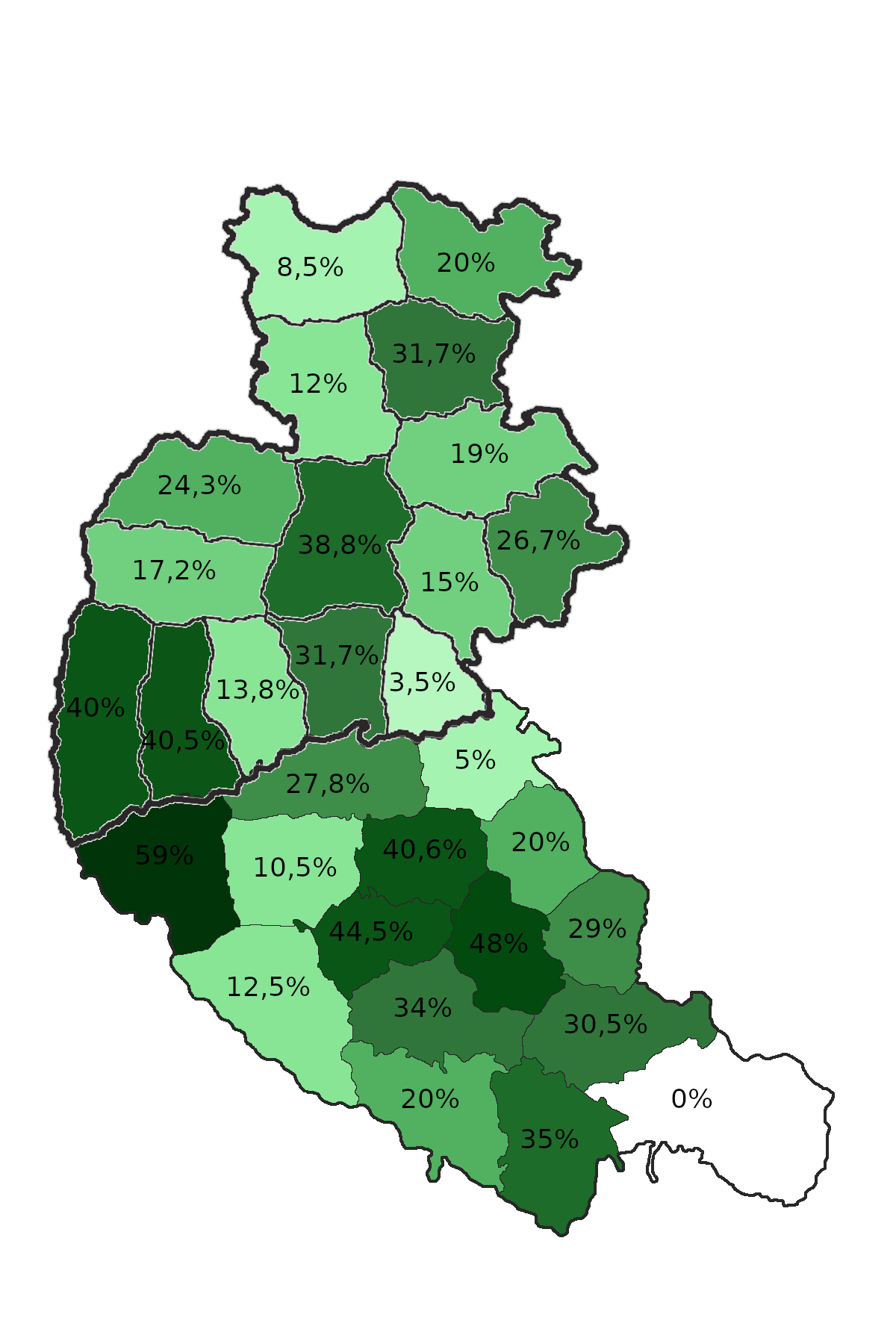
Share of Cossack settlements from the total number of inhabited places by povit of Left-bank Ukraine (Chernihiv and Poltava Governorates) in the 1860s

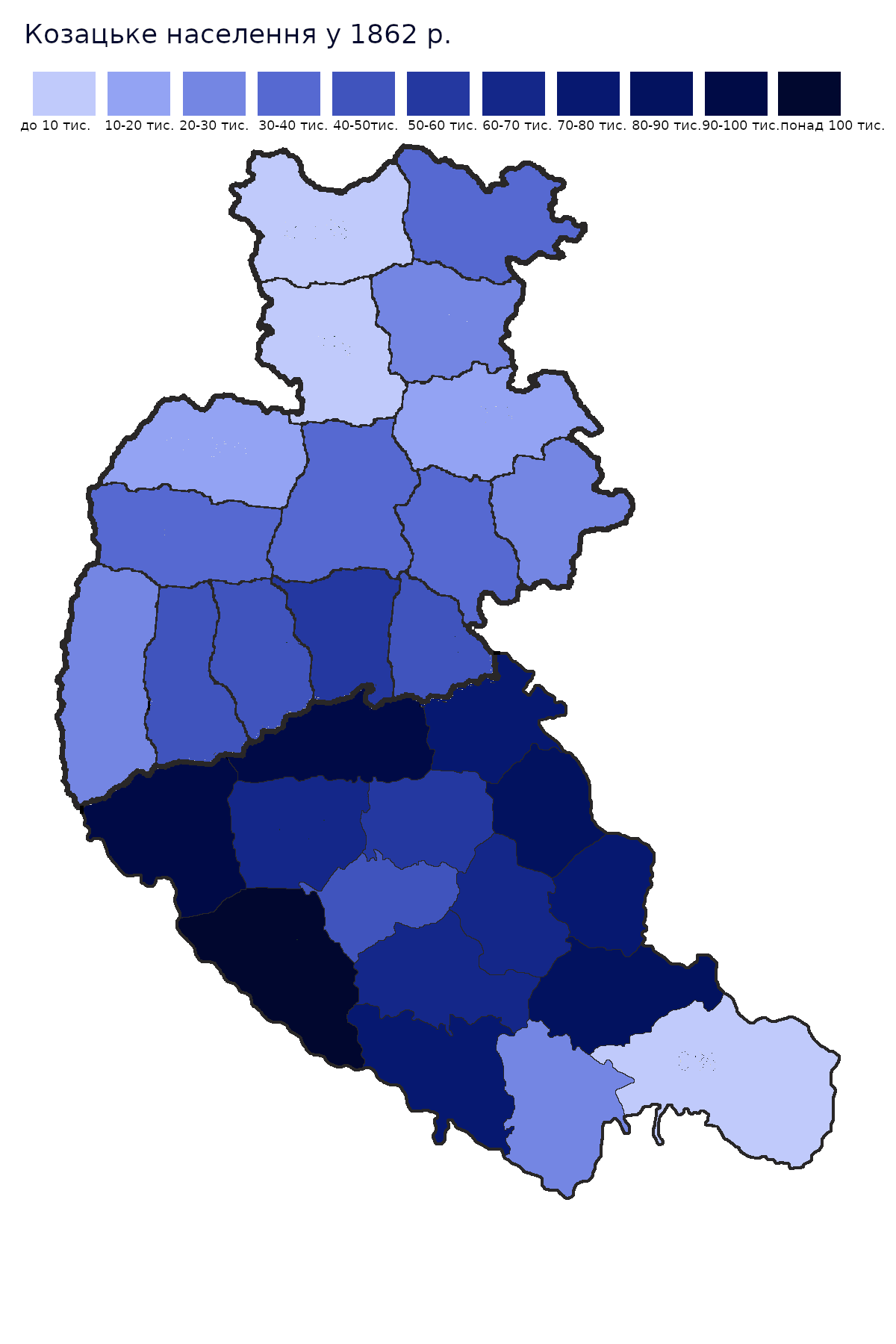
Number of Cossacks inhabiting each povit of Left-bank Ukraine in 1862 (thousands)

1783–1784:

- Glukhovsky Light Cavalry Regiment
- Lubensky Light Cavalry Regiment
- Nezhin Light Cavalry Regiment
- Pereyaslav Light Cavalry Regiment
- Sofia Light Cavalry Regiment
- Starodubovsky Light Cavalry Regiment
- Tver Light Cavalry Regiment
- Poltava Light Cavalry Regiment

1787–1788:

- Smilyansky Cossack Regiment
- Spolyansky Cossack Regiment

1812–1816:

- 1st Ukrainian Cossack Regiment
- 2nd Ukrainian Cossack Regiment
- 3rd Ukrainian Cossack Regiment
- 4th Ukrainian Cossack Regiment
- Poltava Little Russian Cossack Cavalry Regiments No.1 – No.9

1812–1814:

- Chernigov Little Russian Cossack Cavalry Regiments No.1 – No.6

1831–1842:

- Little Russian Cossack No.1 Regiment

1831–1839:

- Little Russian Cossack No.2 Regiment

1831–1832:

- Little Russian Cossack No.3 Regiment
- Little Russian Cossack No.4 Regiment
- Little Russian Cossack No.5 Regiment
- Little Russian Cossack No.6 Regiment
- Little Russian Cossack No.7 Regiment
- Little Russian Cossack No.8 Regiment

1855–1856:

- Little Russian Cossack Regiments No.1 – No.4
- Little Russian Cossack Regiments No.5 and No.6

1863–1864:

- 1st Poltava Cavalry Cossack Regiment
- 2nd Poltava Cavalry Cossack Regiment
- 1st Chernigov Cavalry Cossack Regiment

== Demographics ==
In 1862, there were 1,891,455 people living in the Poltava Governorate, of which 851,357—or about 45 percent—were Cossacks. They made up more than half of the population of Mirgorod, Kobelyak, Lokhvitsky, and Lubensky Uyezds. According to the household census of 1910, Cossack households made up 43.4% of all households in the province (45.9% in villages and 20.3% in cities) and 43.4% of all households in the Poltava Governorate (45.9% in villages and 20.3% in cities). In the Chernigov Governorate, Cossacks made up 30.8% of the population in 1897. They were mainly concentrated in Krolevets, Konotop, Borzna, Nezhyn, and Kozelets Uyezds.

== End ==
In 1918, during the Russian Civil War social estates were liquidated, never to be restored. With the liquidation of social estates, the Malorossian Cossacks disappeared as a class.

== See also ==
- Free Cossacks - volunteer units loyal to the Ukrainian People's Republic, which were established after the Revolution of 1917
