= 1926 Soviet census =

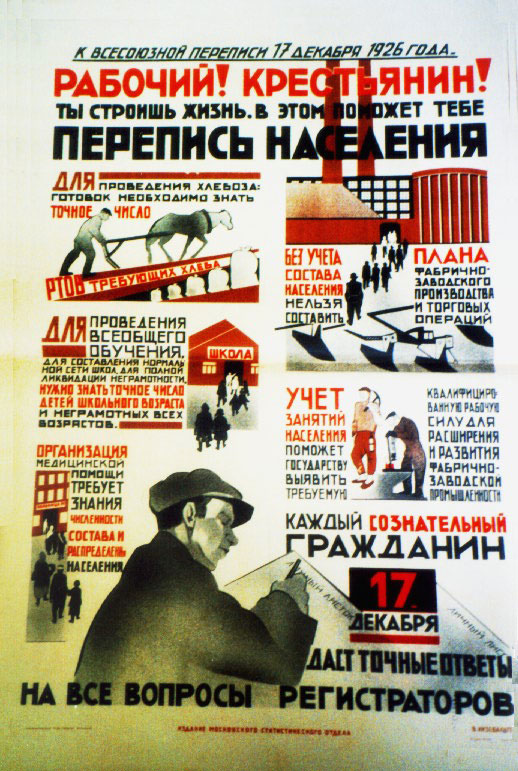
Promotional poster to the 1926 Census

The 1926 Soviet census (Russian: Всесоюзная перепись населения, All-Union census), conducted in December 1926, was the first comprehensive all-Union census in the Soviet Union. It served as a critical instrument in the nation-building efforts of the USSR, furnishing the government with vital ethnographic data. This census played a significant role in the societal shift from the Imperial Russian era to the Soviet period. The methodologies employed by ethnographers in defining individual ethnicity (narodnost), particularly in creating the "List of Ethnicities of the USSR" and delineating borders in ethnically mixed regions, profoundly shaped Soviet policies. Ethnographers, statisticians, and linguists not only designed questionnaires and ethnicity lists but also aimed to actively reshape identities according to Marxism–Leninism. As Anastas Mikoyan stated, the Soviet Union was engaged in "creating and organising new nations".

== Previous Censuses ==
Prior to the 1926 all-Union census, the Bolsheviks had conducted two partial censuses after their rise to power in Russia. The first, the general census of 1920, occurred amidst the Civil War and the Soviet-Polish War. Consequently, it could not cover the Crimea, substantial parts of Transcaucasia, the Ukraine, the Byelorussia, as well as Far Eastern, Siberian, Central Asian, and Far Northern territories. Notably, there was a population increase of only 15,000,000 between 1920 and 1926, reaching approximately 131,304,931 people according to TIME magazine, a figure still not widely disclosed in Russian historical accounts. The 1923 Census was limited to urban areas. Before the Russian Revolution, the sole Russian Empire Census was conducted in 1897.

== Methodology ==
The census classified the population by narodnosti (nationalities), a departure from categories like tribe or clan. This classification, combined with policies that allocated land, resources, and rights to these defined nations, led to interference in data collection by experts and local elites.

Delegations from the Georgian SSR and Ukrainian SSR raised concerns about the census's formulation of narodnosti. The Georgian delegation advocated for classifying the population by natsionalʹnosti, believing it more appropriate for developed nations like Georgians. Ukrainian representatives favored using native language as the basis for classification instead of nationality. However, these objections did not result in changes to the methodology.

Responses regarding nationality were sometimes altered by census takers or later by state analysts to ensure "correctness." It was believed that individuals might "confuse" nationality with other categories such as place of residence, native language, or clan.

== Census Results ==
=== Composition of the USSR ===
The following table provides an overview of the population and territory of the Soviet Republics in 1926:

| No. | Soviet Republic | Territory (km^{2}) | Population | Urban Population | Male Population | Ethnic Russians | Ethnic Ukrainians | Titular Ethnicity |
|---|---|---|---|---|---|---|---|---|
| 1 | RSFSR | 19 651 446 | 100 891 244 | 17 442 655 | 48 170 635 | 74 072 096 | 7 873 331 | |
| 2 | UkSSR | 451 584 | 29 018 187 | 5 373 553 | 14 094 592 | 2 677 166 | 23 218 860 | |
| 3 | BSSR | 126 792 | 4 983 240 | 847 830 | 2 439 801 | 383 806 | 34 681 | 4 017 301 |
| 4 | Transcaucasian SFSR | 185 191 | 5 861 529 | 1 410 876 | 3 009 046 | 336 178 | 35 423 | 1 797 960 |
| 5 | Uzbek SSR | 311 476 | 5 272 801 | 1 102 218 | 2 797 420 | 246 521 | 25 804 | 3 475 340 |
| 6 | Turkmen SSR | 449 698 | 1 000 914 | 136 982 | 531 858 | 75 357 | 6877 | 719 792 |
| | Total | 21 176 187 | 147 027 915 | 26 314 114 | 71 043 352 | 77 791 124 | 31 194 976 | |

For the Transcaucasian Socialist Federative Soviet Republic, Georgians were considered the Titular Nationality.

=== Population of the USSR by Republics ===
- Russian SFSR – 100,891,244 (urban 17,442,655)
  - Kazakh ASSR – 6,503,006 (urban 539,249)
  - Kirghiz ASSR – 993,004 (urban 121,080)
- Ukrainian SSR – 29,018,187 (urban 5,373,553)
  - Moldavian ASSR – 572,114
- Uzbek SSR – 5,272,801 (urban 1,102,218)
  - Tajik ASSR – 827,200
- Byelorussian SSR – 4,983,240 (urban 847,830)
- Transcaucasian SFSR
  - Georgian SSR – 2,666,494 (urban 594,221)
  - Azerbaijan SSR – 2,314,571 (urban 649,557)
  - Armenian SSR – 880,464 (urban 167,098)
- Turkmen SSR – 1,000,914 (urban 136,982)
- Total in the Soviet Union – 147,027,915 (urban 26,314,114)

=== Population of the USSR Sorted by Most Common Nationalities in 1926 ===
| | USSR | RSFSR | Ukrainian SSR | Byelorussian SSR | TSFSR | Uzbek SSR | Turkmen SSR |
|---|---|---|---|---|---|---|---|
| Total | 147,027,915 | 100,623,000 | 29,018,187 | 4,983,240 | 5,861,529 | 5,272,801 | 1,000,914 |
| Russians | 77,791,124 | 74,072,000 | 2,677,166 | 383,806 | 336,178 | 246,521 | 75,357 |
| Ukrainians | 31,194,976 | 7,873,000 | 23,218,860 | 34,681 | 35,423 | 25,804 | 6,877 |
| Belorussians | 4,738,923 | 638,000 | 75,842 | 4,017,031 | 3,767 | 3,515 | 864 |
| Georgians | 1,821,184 | 21,000 | 1,265 | 52 | 1,797,960 | 697 | 258 |
| Armenians | 1,567,568 | 195,000 | 10,631 | 99 | 1,332,593 | 14,976 | 13,859 |
| Turks | 1,706,605 | 28,000 | 56 | 0 | 1,652,768 | 21,565 | 4,229 |
| Uzbeks | 3,904,622 | 325,000 | 23 | 0 | 72 | 3,475,340 | 104,971 |
| Turkmen | 763,940 | 18,000 | 21 | 1 | 102 | 25,954 | 719,792 |
| Kazakhs | 3,968,289 | 3,852,000 | 98 | 18 | 61 | 106,980 | 9,471 |
| Kirghiz | 762,736 | 672,000 | 36 | 1 | 10 | 90,743 | 0 |
| Tatars | 2,916,536 | 2,846,734 | 22,281 | 3,777 | 10,574 | 28,401 | 4,769 |
| Chuvash | 1,117,419 | 1,114,813 | 905 | 739 | 92 | 315 | 555 |
| Bashkirs | 713,693 | 712,000 | 114 | 8 | 14 | 765 | 426 |
| Yakuts | 240,709 | 240,687 | 14 | 1 | 0 | 3 | 4 |
| Karakalpaks | 146,317 | 118,217 | 0 | 0 | 0 | 26,563 | 1,537 |
| Tajiks | 978,680 | 10,385 | 0 | 0 | 1 | 967,728 | 566 |
| Ossetians | 272,272 | 157,000 | 184 | 18 | 114,450 | 234 | 38 |
| Talysh | 77,323 | 0 | 0 | 0 | 77,323 | 0 | 0 |
| Tats | 28,705 | 223 | 35 | 0 | 28,443 | 0 | 4 |
| Kurds | 69,184 | 14,701 | 1 | 0 | 52,173 | 1 | 2,308 |
| Mordva | 1,340,415 | 1,334,700 | 1,171 | 1,051 | 1,238 | 1,805 | 491 |
| Mari | 428,192 | 428,000 | 122 | 18 | 14 | 19 | 18 |
| Karelians | 248,120 | 248,030 | 60 | 19 | 7 | 1 | 3 |
| Udmurts | 514,187 | 514,000 | 91 | 45 | 6 | 19 | 8 |
| Komi | 226,383 | 226,300 | 42 | 21 | 18 | 5 | 5 |
| Permyaks | 149,488 | 149,400 | 36 | 3 | 1 | 0 | 0 |
| Buryats | 237,501 | 237,000 | 3 | 1 | 2 | 0 | 1 |
| Kalmyks | 132,114 | 131,757 | 92 | 1 | 8 | 18 | 2 |
| Germans | 1,238,549 | 806,301 | 393,924 | 7,075 | 25,327 | 4,646 | 1,276 |
| Jews | 2,599,973 | 566,917 | 1,574,391 | 407,059 | 31,175 | 19,611 | 1,820 |
| Poles | 782,334 | 197,827 | 476,435 | 97,498 | 6,324 | 3,411 | 839 |
| Greeks | 213,765 | 50,649 | 104,666 | 55 | 57,935 | 347 | 113 |
| Vainakhs | 392,600 | 390,000 | 51 | 7 | 84 | 5 | 2 |
| Moldavians | 278,903 | 20,525 | 257,794 | 63 | 316 | 173 | 24 |
| Bulgarians | 111,296 | 18,644 | 92,078 | 22 | 203 | 321 | 28 |
| Latvians | 151,410 | 126,277 | 9,131 | 14,061 | 951 | 737 | 232 |
| Lithuanians | 41,463 | 26,856 | 6,795 | 6,853 | 572 | 311 | 65 |
| Abkhazians | 56,957 | 98 | 8 | 0 | 56,851 | 0 | 0 |

=== List of Ethnicities ===
This list, officially titled Programmy i posobiya po razrabotke Vsesoyuznoy perepisi naseleniya 1926 goda, vol. 7, Perechen i slovar narodnostey, Moscow 1927, was compiled by the Central Statistical Administration of the USSR in preparation for the census.

1. Russian – 77 791 124
2. Ukrainian – 31 194 976
3. Belarusian – 4 738 923
4. Polish – 782 334
5. Czech
6. Slovak
7. Serb
8. Bulgarian – 111 296
9. Latvian – 151 410
10. Lithuanian – 41 463
11. Latgalian
12. Samogitian (Zhmud)
13. German – 1 238 549
14. British
15. Swedish
16. Dutch
17. Italian
18. French
19. Romanian – 278 903
20. Moldavians – 278 903
21. Greek – 213 765
22. Albanian (Arnaut)
23. Jewish (Ashkenazi) – 2,599,973
24. Crimean Jewish – 6,383
25. Mountain Jewish (Dag Chufut) – 25,974
26. Georgian Jewish – 21,471
27. Bukharan Jewish (Dzhugur) – 18,698
28. Karaim – 8,324
29. Finnish
30. Leningrad Finnish (Chukhontsy)
31. Karelian
32. Tavastian
33. Estonian – 154 666
34. Vepsian (Chud)
35. Vod (Vote)
36. Izhorian (Ingrian)
37. Kven
38. Lopars (Sami people)
39. Zyrian
40. Permyak
41. Udmurt (Votiak)
42. Besermyan
43. Mari (Cheremis)
44. Mordva (Moksha, Erzya, Teryukhan, Karatai)
45. Magyar (Hungarian)
46. Gagauz
47. Chuvash – 1 117 419
48. Tatar – 2 916 536
49. Mishar (Meshcheriak)
50. Bashkir – 713 693
51. Nagaybak
52. Nogai
53. Gypsy
54. Kalmyk
55. Mongol
56. Buryat
57. Sart-Kalmyk
58. Mansi (Vogul)
59. Khanty (Ostyak)
60. Selkup (Ostyak-Samoyed)
61. Nenets (Samoyed)
62. Yurak
63. Soyot (Uriankhai)
64. Barabin (Barbara Tartar)
65. Bukharan (Bukharlyk)
66. Chernevyy Tatar (Tubalar, Tuba-Kizhi)
67. Altai (Altai-Kizhi, Mountain or White Kalmyk)
68. Teleut
69. Telengit (Telengut)
70. Kumandin (Lebedin, Ku-Kohzi)
71. Shors
72. Kharagas (Tuba, Kharagaz)
73. Kızıl (Kyzyl)
74. Kachin
75. Sagai
76. Koybal
77. Beltir
78. Dolgan (Dolgan-Iakut)
79. Yakut (Sakha, Urangkhai-Sakha) – 240 709
80. Tungus (Ovenk, Murchen)
81. Lamut
82. Orochon
83. Golds (Nanai people)
84. Olchi (Mangun, Ulchi)
85. Negidal (Negda, Eleke Beye)
86. Orochi
87. Udegei (Ude)
88. Orok
89. Manegir - 59 persons. A former division of Evenks. They lived along the Kumara River, hence an alternative designation, "Kumarchen"
90. Samogir (Самогиры), Nanai people Tungusic people
91. Manchurian
92. Chukchi
93. Koryaks
94. Kamchadal (Itel'men)
95. Gilyak (Nivkhi)
96. Yukagir
97. Chuvan
98. Aleut
99. Eskimo
100. Enisei (Ket, Enisei Ostiak)
101. Aino (Ainu, Kuchi)
102. Chinese
103. Korean
104. Japanese
105. Georgian (Kartvelian) – 1 821 184
106. Ajar
107. Megeli (Mingrelian)
108. Laz (Chan)
109. Svan (Svanetian)
110. Abkhaz (Abkhazian) – 56 957
111. Cherkess (Adyghe)
112. Beskesek-Abaza (Abazin)
113. Kabard
114. Ubykh
115. Chechen (Nakh, Nakhchuo)
116. Ingush (Galgai, Kist)
117. Batsbi (Tsova-Tish, Batswa)
118. Maistvei (Майствеи), combined into Chechen people
119. Lezgin
120. Tabasaran
121. Agul
122. Archi
123. Rutul (Mykhad)
124. Tsakhur
125. Khinalug
126. Dzhek (Dzhektsy)
127. Khaput (Gaputlin, Khaputlin)
128. Kryz
129. Budukh (Budug)
130. Udin
131. Dargin
132. Kubachin (Ughbug)
133. Lak (Kazi-Kumukh)
134. Avar (Avartsy, Khunzal)
135. Andi (Andiitsy, Kwanally)
136. Botlog (Buikhatli)
137. Godoberi
138. Karatai
139. Akhvakh
140. Bagulal (Kvanandin)
141. Chamalal
142. Tindi (Tindal, Idera)
143. Didoi (Tsez)
144. Kvarshi
145. Kapuchin (Bezheta)
146. Khunzal (Enzebi, Nakhad)
147. Armenian – 1 567 568
148. Hemshin
149. Arab
150. Aisor (Assyrian)
151. Kaytak (Karakaitak)
152. Bosha (Karachi, Armenian Gypsy)
153. Ossetian – 272 272
154. Kurd
155. Yazid
156. Talysh
157. Tat
158. Persian
159. Karachai
160. Kumyk
161. Balkar (Mountain Tartar, Malkar)
162. Karakalpak
163. Turk
164. Ottoman Turk (Osmanli)
165. Samarkand and Fergana Turk
166. Turkmen – 763 940
167. Kirgiz (Kyrgyz, Kara-Kirgiz)
168. Karakalpak – 146 317
169. Kypchak
170. Kashgar
171. Taranchi
172. Kazakh (Kirgiz-Kazakh, Kirgiz-Kaisak) – 3 968 289
173. Kurama
174. Uzbek – 3 904 622
175. Dungan
176. Afghan
177. Tajik – 978 680
178. Vakhan
179. Ishkashimi people
180. Shugnan
181. Yagnob
182. Yazgul
183. Iranian
184. Jemshid
185. Beludji
186. Berber
187. Khazara (Hazaras)
188. Hindu (Indian)
189. Other ethnicities
190. Ethnicities not noted or noted inexactly

a) Tavlin
b) Kryashens
c) Teptyars
d) Uigar
e) Oirot
f) Khakass
g) Others

191. Foreign subjects

== Ukrainian SSR ==
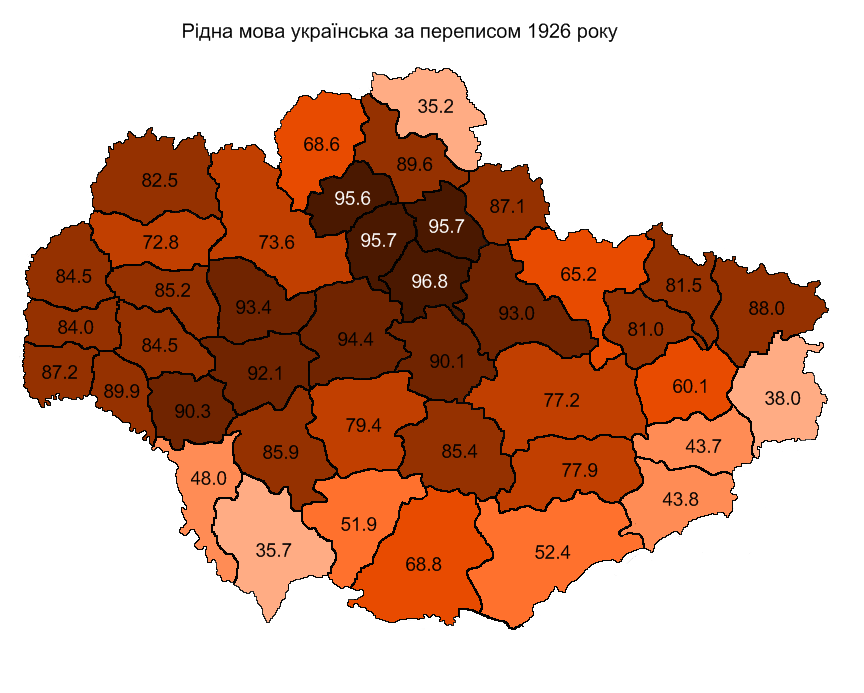
Percentage of the population of the okruhas of the Ukrainian SSR that indicated Ukrainian as their native language.

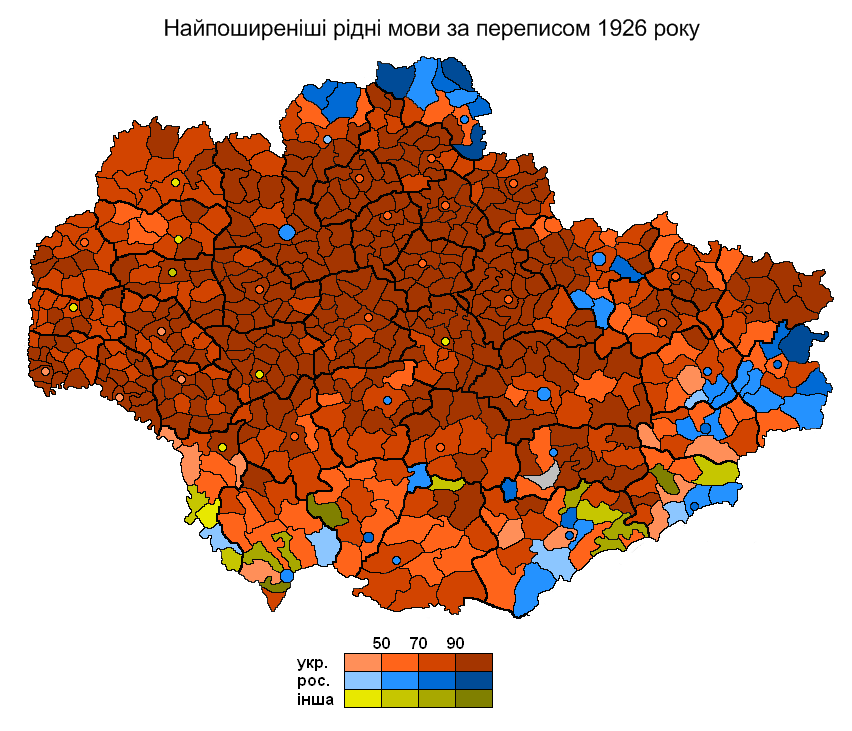
The most common native language in raions and cities of the Ukrainian SSR.

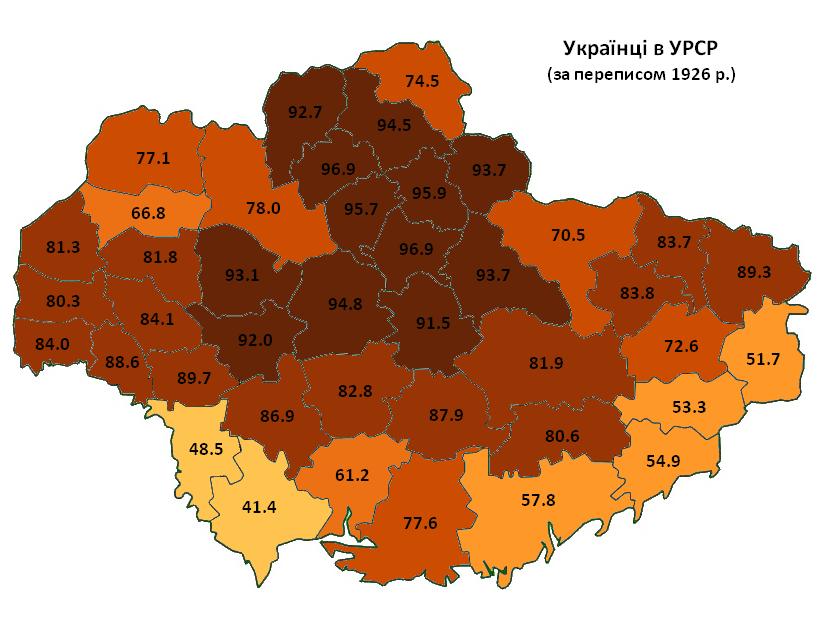
Percentage of the ethnically Ukrainian population of the okruhas of the Ukrainian SSR.

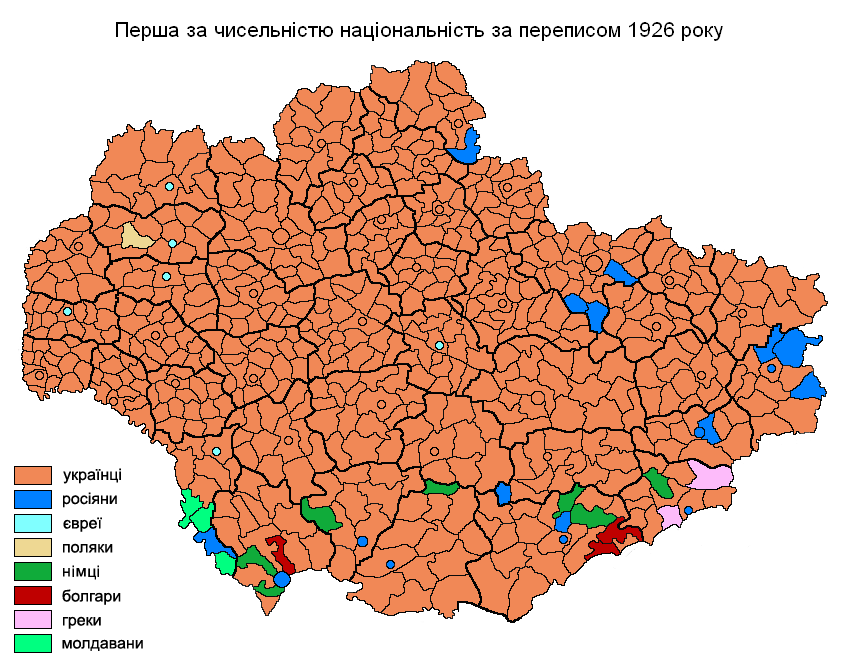
The most common ethnic group in raions and cities of the Ukrainian SSR.

=== Administrative Divisions of Ukraine (1925–1932) ===
The census data for Soviet Ukraine was aggregated for several okruhas into larger subdivisions known as pidraion or podraion (Russian: подрайон, romanized: podraion; Ukrainian: підрайон, romanized: pidraion). There were six such subdivisions.

=== Subdistricts (Pidraions) ===
- Polissia Subdistrict (Poliskyi pidraion)
  - Chernihiv Okruha
  - Hlukhiv Okruha
  - Konotop Okruha
  - Korosten Okruha
  - Volyn Okruha
- Right-bank Subdistrict (Pravoberezhnyi pidraion)
  - Bila Tserkva Okruha
  - Berdychiv Okruha
  - Kamianets Okruha
  - Kyiv Okruha
  - Mohyliv Okruha
  - Proskuriv Okruha
  - Tulchyn Okruha
  - Uman Okruha
  - Shevchenko Okruha
  - Shepetivka Okruha
  - Vinnytsia Okruha
- Left-bank Subdistrict (Livoberezhnyi pidraion)
  - Izyum Okruha
  - Kharkiv Okruha
  - Kremenchuk Okruha
  - Kupiansk Okruha
  - Lubny Okruha
  - Nizhyn Okruha
  - Poltava Okruha
  - Pryluky Okruha
  - Romny Okruha
  - Sumy Okruha
- Steppe Subdistrict (Stepovyi pidraion)
  - Zinovievsk Okruha
  - Mariupol Okruha
  - Melitopol Okruha
  - Mykolaiv Okruha
  - Odesa Okruha
  - Pervomaisk Okruha
  - Starobilsk Okruha (oscillated)
  - Kherson Okruha
  - Moldavian ASSR
- Dnipropetrovsk Subdistrict (Dnipropetrovskyi pidraion)
  - Dnipropetrovsk Okruha
  - Zaporizhzhia Okruha
  - Kryvyi Rih Okruha
- Mining Industrial Subdistrict (Hirnychopromyslovyi pidraion)
  - Artemivsk Okruha
  - Luhansk Okruha
  - Stalino Okruha

== See also ==
- Administrative division of Ukraine (1918)
- Administrative divisions of Ukraine (1918–1925)
- Administrative divisions of the Ukrainian SSR
- Development of the administrative divisions of Ukraine
- Okruhas of the Ukrainian SSR
