= Vasyl Ellan-Blakytny =

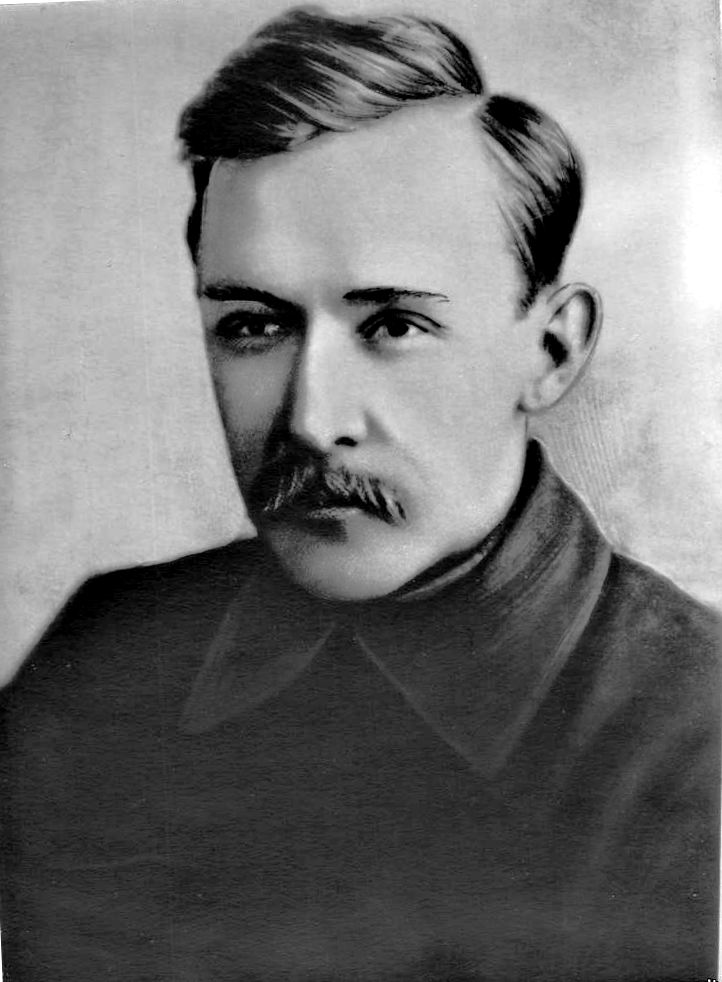
- Born: January 12, 1894; Khmilnytsia, Chernigovsky Uyezd, Chernihiv Governorate, Russian Empire
- Died: December 4, 1925 (age 31); Kharkiv, Ukrainian SSR, Soviet Union
- Occupations: poet, politician
- Writing career
- Pen name: Ellan
- Language: Ukrainian
- Period: 1920-1933
- Genres: poetry, publicistic writing

Signature
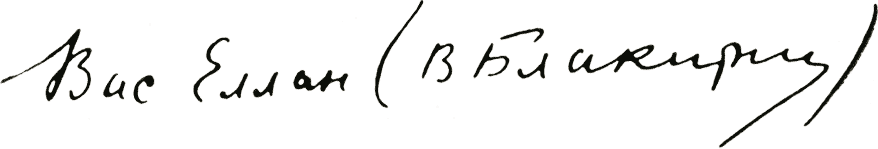

Vasyl Ellan-Blakytny (Ukrainian: Василь Еллан-Блакитний, born Vasyl Ellansky, Василь Елланський; January 12, 1894 – December 4, 1925) was a Ukrainian poet, journalist and politician. As a poet, using the pseudonym Ellan, he was hailed as a pioneer of Ukrainian proletarian literature. Ellansky was a founder of the Borotbists party, since 1920 he had been a member of Central committee of the Communist Party of Ukraine.

== Biography ==
Born in the village of Khmilnytsia, Chernigovsky Uyezd, Chernihiv Governorate, Russian Empire in north Ukraine, the son of a village priest, Blakitny was educated in a village school and in a seminary, then an ecclesiastical seminary, and the Kyiv University. While he was at seminary, he joined an underground Ukrainian nationalist circle.

At university, he joined the Ukrainian Socialist Revolutionary Party. In 1911-1917, he worked for youth organisations, under police supervision. After the February Revolution, in 1917, he was an active in the Socialist Revolutionary party in Chernihiv, and was one of the leaders called the Left Bank (Levoberezhtsev).

The levoberezhtsi supported the Bolshevik Revolution and alliance with Soviet Russia. After the Ukrainian Rada had been driven out of Kyiv by the red army, Blakitny worked with the Kyiv soviet, but during the German occupation, in 1918, he was arrested and spent several months in Lukyanivska Prison. While he was in prison, the levoberezhtsi gained control of the Central Committee of the Ukrainian SR party, and disbanded the party, on the grounds that it was manifestly counter-revolutionary, and merged with the Borotbists. Blakitny was elected a member of the Central Committee of the new organisation. After his release from prison, he worked underground in Odessa, Mykolaiv, and Poltava, where he was one of the leaders of the resistance to German rule.

After a failed attempt to establish soviet rule in Poltava, he was imprisoned by Ukrainian nationalists loyal to Symon Petliura, but was freed by the arrival of the Red Army. He moved to Kyiv, where he was elected to the Central Executive Committee of the Ukraine soviets, and appointed editor of the newspaper Borotba. He was one of the leaders of the Borotbist faction who advocating merging with the Ukraine communist party. In March 1920, he was elected a member of the Central Committee of the Ukraine CP, and later head of the Ukraine publishing house.

== Literary work ==
In 1923, he found a literary organization of Ukrainian revolutionary writers "Hart" (Ukrainian: Гарт which means hardening). As his literary debut he had published symbolist poetry; Blakytny as one of the first in Ukrainian literature had been writing proletarian poetry; among his works were also satirical feuilletons and political publicistic.

== Death and legacy ==
He died of heart disease, in Kharkiv, on 4 December 1925. After his death, a literary group called the Free Academy of Proletarian Literature, was formed by his friend Mykola Khvylovy.

In 1930s his works were considered as a manifestation of Ukrainian nationalism and became prohibited; the monument of him in Kharkiv was demolished.

== Sources ==
- Юрій Лавріненко. Розстріляне відродження: Антологія 1917–1933. — Київ: Смолоскип, 2004. (in Ukrainian)
- Малий словник історії України / Відповідальний редактор Валерій Смолій. — К.: Либідь, 1997. (in Ukrainian)
- Andrzej Chojnowski, Jan Bruski - "Ukraina", Warszawa 2006, ISBN 978-83-7436-039-5 (in Polish)
