= Putivlsky Uyezd =

Subdivision of the Russian Empire

Putivlsky Uyezd (Russian: Путивльский уе́зд; Ukrainian: Путивльський повіт, romanized: Putyvlskyi povit) was one of the subdivisions of the Kursk Governorate of the Russian Empire, and later of the Russian SFSR. It was situated in the western part of the governorate. Its administrative centre was Putivl.

== History ==
On 16 October 1925, amidst a series of minor territorial exchanges between the Russian SFSR, the Ukrainian SSR, and the Byelorussian SSR, the former area of Putivlsky Uyezd (excluding the former territory of Kurnets Volost) was transferred from the Russian SFSR to the Ukrainian SSR. The western portion of the territory was incorporated into Konotop Okruha, and the eastern portion was incorporated into Hlukhiv Okruha.

== Demographics ==
At the time of the Russian Empire Census of 1897, Putivlsky Uyezd had a population of 164,133. Of these, 52.5% spoke Ukrainian, 46.9% Russian, 0.4% Yiddish, 0.1% Polish and 0.1% Romani as their native language.
