= Dmitry Ivanyuk =

Red Army colonel

Dmitry Ivanovich Ivanyuk
- Ivanyuk, c. 1940
- Born: 28 May 1900; Nikolayevka, Chernigov Governorate Russian Empire
- Died: 25 June 1941 (aged 41) MIA in Slawharad, Byelorussian SSR
- Allegiance: Russian SFSR; Soviet Union
- Branch: Red Army
- Service years: 1920–1941
- Rank: Colonel
- Commands: 197th Rifle Division; 180th Rile Division; 55th Rifle Division
- Conflicts: World War II

Dmitry Ivanovich Ivanyuk (Russian: Дмитрий Иванович Иванюк; 28 May 1900 – before 17 July 1941) was a Red Army colonel killed in World War II.

== Early life and Russian Civil War ==
A Ukrainian, Dmitry Ivanovich Ivanyuk was born to a peasant family on 28 May 1900 in the village of Nikolayevka, Strelnitsky volost, Borznyansky Uyezd, Chernigov Governorate. He joined the Red Army in April 1920 during the Russian Civil War and was sent to the 1st Reserve Rifle Regiment at Konotop. In July he was transferred to the 25th Rifle Division, in which he served in the 217th Rifle Regiment and the commandant's command of the division headquarters. With the division, Ivanyuk fought in the Polish–Soviet War in the area of Sarny, Kovel, Rovno, and Lutsk.

== Interwar period ==
Ivanyuk was sent to study at the 55th Zhitomir Infantry Course in February 1921. After his graduation in September 1922 he was sent to the 134th Rifle Regiment of the 45th Rifle Division of the Ukrainian Military District, where he served as a squad leader, assistant commander and acting platoon commander. From October 1923 he commanded a platoon of the divisional school. In September 1924 he returned to the 134th Rifle Regiment and was appointed an assistant company commander. In October 1925 he was transferred to the 137th Rifle Regiment of the 46th Rifle Division, serving as a company commander. During this period he completed an external normal military school course under the Kamenev Combined Military School at Kiev in 1928 and the Vystrel course between November 1929 and May 1930. Ivanyuk became a member of the Communist Party in 1927. He rose to command of a rifle battalion of the regiment in April 1931, but was soon transferred to command the regimental training battalion in November of that year.

In March 1935 he was appointed chief of staff of the 138th Rifle Regiment of the division, and from July 1937 commanded the 287th Rifle Regiment of the 51st Perekop Rifle Division of the 6th Rifle Corps of the Kiev Military District. Promoted to colonel in 1938, Ivanyuk became assistant commander of the 99th Rifle Division in December 1938, then commanded the 197th Rifle Division of the Oryol Military District from September 1939. This proved brief as a month later he was transferred to command the 180th Rifle Division of the same district. Appointed commander of the 55th Rifle Division of the 47th Rifle Corps of the Western Special Military District in February 1940, Ivanyuk completed KUVNAS at the Frunze Military Academy between November 1940 and May 1941, then returned to the 55th.

== World War II ==
After Operation Barbarossa began, Ivanyuk led the division as part of the 4th Army of the Western Front in the Border Battles. In the area of Propoysk the division was surrounded and suffered heavy losses. Scattered groups of the division managed to slip through the encirclement. Ivanyuk was not among those who broke out and was declared missing in action on 17 July. He was survived by his wife, Mariya Alekseyevna.

== See also ==
- List of people who disappeared
