= 329th Rifle Division =

- Active: 1941–1945
- Country: Soviet Union
- Branch: Red Army
- Type: Infantry
- Size: Division
- Engagements: Battle of Moscow; Lvov–Sandomierz Offensive; Vistula-Oder Offensive; Silesian Offensives; Battle of Berlin; Battle of Halbe; Prague Offensive
- Decorations: Order of the Red Banner; Order of Suvorov; Order of Kutuzov 2nd class (all 2nd formation)
- Battle honours: Kielce (2nd Formation)

Commanders
- Notable commanders: Col. Nikolai Matveevich Makovchuk; Col. Kornei Mikhailovich Andrusenko; Col. Nikolai Lavrentevich Soldatov; Maj. Gen. Aleksey Aleksandrovich Yamanov; Maj. Gen Zakhar Trofimovich Trofimov; Col. Ivan Ivanovich Yaremenko; Col. Aleksandr Alekseevich Shikita; Col. Fyodor Fyodorovich Abashev

The 329th Rifle Division was first formed in September 1941, as a standard Red Army rifle division, at Voronezh. This formation was assigned to the Western Front in mid-December as the Soviet winter counter-offensive west of Moscow was developing, but had the misfortune to be cut off and destroyed behind German lines. The division was formed again nearly two years later, this time in 1st Ukrainian Front, and served with distinction with this Front during the final twelve months of the war, winning honors for its roles in the fighting in Poland, Breslau and Berlin before ending the war near Prague.

== 1st Formation ==
The division first formed on 1 September 1941 in the Oryol Military District at Voronezh, right alongside the 327th Rifle Division. Col. Nikolai Matveevich Makovchuk took command the same day and remained in that post until 7 February 1942. The division's basic order of battle was as follows:

- 1110th Rifle Regiment
- 1112th Rifle Regiment
- 1114th Rifle Regiment
- 895th Artillery Regiment

In late October the division was assigned to 26th Reserve Army, which was forming up in the Reserve of the Supreme High Command. At the beginning of December, the 329th was in the Moscow Defense Zone in the 60th Reserve Army before being reassigned to 5th Army in Western Front.

=== Battle of Moscow ===
5th Army went over to the counteroffensive on December 6. By the close of December 11 the 329th, along with the 108th, 144th, and 19th Rifle Divisions had pierced the defensive front of the German 252nd, 87th, 78th and (coincidentally) 329th Infantry Divisions, and had reached the area of Lokotnya and Kolyubakovo. Western Front issued further orders for a continuation of the offensive on December 13. As well, Maj. Gen. Lev Dovator's 2nd Guards Cavalry Corps was moved to the 5th Army sector in the woods north of Kubinka. After a series of quick blows the rifle divisions mentioned above, plus the 50th, went over to the attack. Due to strong enemy resistance and extensive fortifications the assault made little immediate headway. However, enough of a gap was forced in the German line on the boundary between the 329th and the 19th divisions that the cavalry was able to pass through along a forlorn and roadless forest sector, beginning a deep raid which would disrupt and demoralize the enemy; already on the next day 5th Army resumed its advance. On December 20, the 19th and 329th Rifle Divisions forced the Ruza River and liberated three villages. But this river line had been fortified by the Germans, and 5th Army's forces had lost many men and much equipment over the course of its fighting pursuit, so it was necessary to call a halt.

In January 1942, the division formed part of the assault group of 33rd Army, which was driving through the lines of Army Group Center towards Vyasma. This objective was not quite reached, and the army was cut off behind German lines by counterattacks in early February. On the 8th, the division came under the command of Col. Kornei Mikhailovich Andrusenko. By the beginning of May, Western Front was developing a plan to break through to these isolated pockets with major forces and to hold them as staging areas for further operations. On May 10, Colonel Andrusenko handed command of the division to Col. Nikolai Lavrentevich Soldatov, who would hold the post until the division was disbanded. On May 20, by Front order, the "Special Group of General Belov" was created and consisted of Lt. Gen. Pavel Belov's 1st Guards Cavalry Corps, the 329th Rifle Division, units of the 4th Airborne Corps, and several large partisan detachments. However, the plan was never implemented, due to renewed German offensive action and the poor organization of the airlift operations that were intended to support Group Belov. Late winter snow and early spring mud had delayed the inevitable, but by the end of the month the Germans had reduced the remaining men of the 329th to small, barely organized groups. The division was carried under the Western Front reserves until June, but by then it was clear that not enough of these men would slip out of the forests and back to Soviet lines, and on August 22 the unit was officially disbanded.

Colonel Andrusenko was one of those fortunate enough to escape, but his story nearly ended tragically as he was put on trial before the military tribunal of Western Front "for criminal inaction" during the encirclement battle. On April 6 he was deprived of his military rank and sentenced to death. He applied to the Military Collegium of the Supreme Court of the USSR for a pardon, and on May 4 his sentence was reduced to 10 years in the Gulag without full loss of rank, although he was demoted to Major. The sentence was also deferred until after the end of the war, so he continued to serve at the front. While Andrusenko had a further run-in with the military authorities later that year, he went on to regain his rank, be awarded the Gold Star Hero of the Soviet Union for his leadership in crossing the Dniepr, and take command of the 55th Rifle Division.

== 2nd Formation ==
After an effective absence of more than two years from the Red Army order of battle, a new 329th Rifle Division was formed on 4 May 1944, in the 3rd Guards Army of 1st Ukrainian Front, near Lutzk in the Kiev Military District. Maj. Gen. Aleksei Aleksandrovich Yamanov was appointed as commanding officer on the same date; he was replaced by Maj. Gen. Zakhar Trofimovich Trofimov on July 26 when Yamanov was promoted to command of 21st Rifle Corps. The division remained in the same army and Front for the duration of the war. For most of 1944 it was in either 21st or 22nd Rifle Corps, but during the last weeks of the war it was in 120th Rifle Corps. General Trofimov made way for Col. Ivan Ivanovich Yaremenko to take command a month later, and Yaremenko would remain there until the first few days of the next year.

During the Vistula-Oder Offensive, on 15 January 1945 the division was recognized for its role in the liberation of the Polish city of Kielce:

"KELETZ" [KIELCE]... 329th Rifle Division (Colonel Aleksandr Andreevich Shikita)... The troops who participated in the battles for the liberation of Kielce, by the order of the Supreme High Command, and a commendation in Moscow, are given a salute of 20 artillery salvoes from 224 guns.

The division saw one more change of command on 4 February, when Col. Fyodor Fyodorovich Abashev took command and led the division to the war's end. On 5 April, the 329th was recognized for its contributions in the fighting around Breslau with the award of the Order of Kutuzov. When the division completed its combat path in Czechoslovakia in May, it carried the full title of 329th Rifle, Keletz, Order of Suvorov, Order of Kutuzov Division. (Russian: 329-я стрелковая Келецкая орденов Суворова и Кутузова дивизия.)

== Postwar ==
On June 4 the 329th gained further distinction for its role in liquidating enemy forces in the southeast sector of the city during the Battle of Berlin with the award of the Order of the Red Banner. The division was disbanded "in place" with the Central Group of Forces in the summer of 1945.
