= Andrusenko =

Andrusenko (Ukrainian: Андрусенко) is a Ukrainian surname. Notable people with the surname include:

- Kornei Andrusenko (1899–1976), Soviet-Ukrainian colonel
- Veronika Andrusenko (born 1991), Russian swimmer
- Viacheslav Andrusenko (born 1992), Russian swimmer
- Mikhail Andrusenko (born 1961), Russian table tennis player
- Ira Andrusenko, Ukrainian agent at IMAGE 4 SPORT
