= Novgorod-Seversky Uyezd =

Subdivision of the Russian Empire

Novgorod-Seversky Uyezd (Russian: Новгород-Северский уезд; Ukrainian: Новгород-Сіверський повіт, romanized: Novhorod-Siverskyi povit) was one of the subdivisions of the Chernigov Governorate of the Russian Empire. It was situated in the eastern part of the governorate. Its administrative center was Novgorod-Seversky (Novhorod-Siverskyi).

== Demographics ==
At the time of the Russian Empire Census of 1897, Novgorod-Seversky Uyezd had a population of 146,236. Of these, 91.1% spoke Ukrainian, 4.4% Yiddish, 4.3% Russian and 0.1% Polish as their native language.
