= Krolevetsky Uyezd =

Krolevetsky Uyezd (Russian: Кролевецкий уезд; Ukrainian: Кролевецький повіт, romanized: Krolevetskyi povit) was one of the subdivisions of the Chernigov Governorate of the Russian Empire. It was situated in the eastern part of the governorate. Its administrative centre was Krolevets.

== Demographics ==
At the time of the Russian Empire Census of 1897, Krolevetsky Uyezd had a population of 131,089. Of these, 96.3% spoke Ukrainian, 3.0% Yiddish and 0.7% Russian as their native language.
