= Sosnitsky Uyezd =

Sosnitsky Uyezd (Russian: Сосницкий уезд; Ukrainian: Сосницький повіт, romanized: Sosnytskyi povit) was one of the subdivisions of the Chernigov Governorate of the Russian Empire. It was situated in the central part of the governorate. Its administrative centre was Sosnitsa (Sosnytsia).

== Demographics ==
At the time of the Russian Empire Census of 1897, Sosnitsky Uyezd had a population of 170,057. Of these, 94.2% spoke Ukrainian, 4.5% Yiddish, 1.0% Russian, 0.1% Polish and 0.1% Belarusian as their native language.
