= Konotop Okruha =

Konotop Okruha Конотопська округа
- Okruha
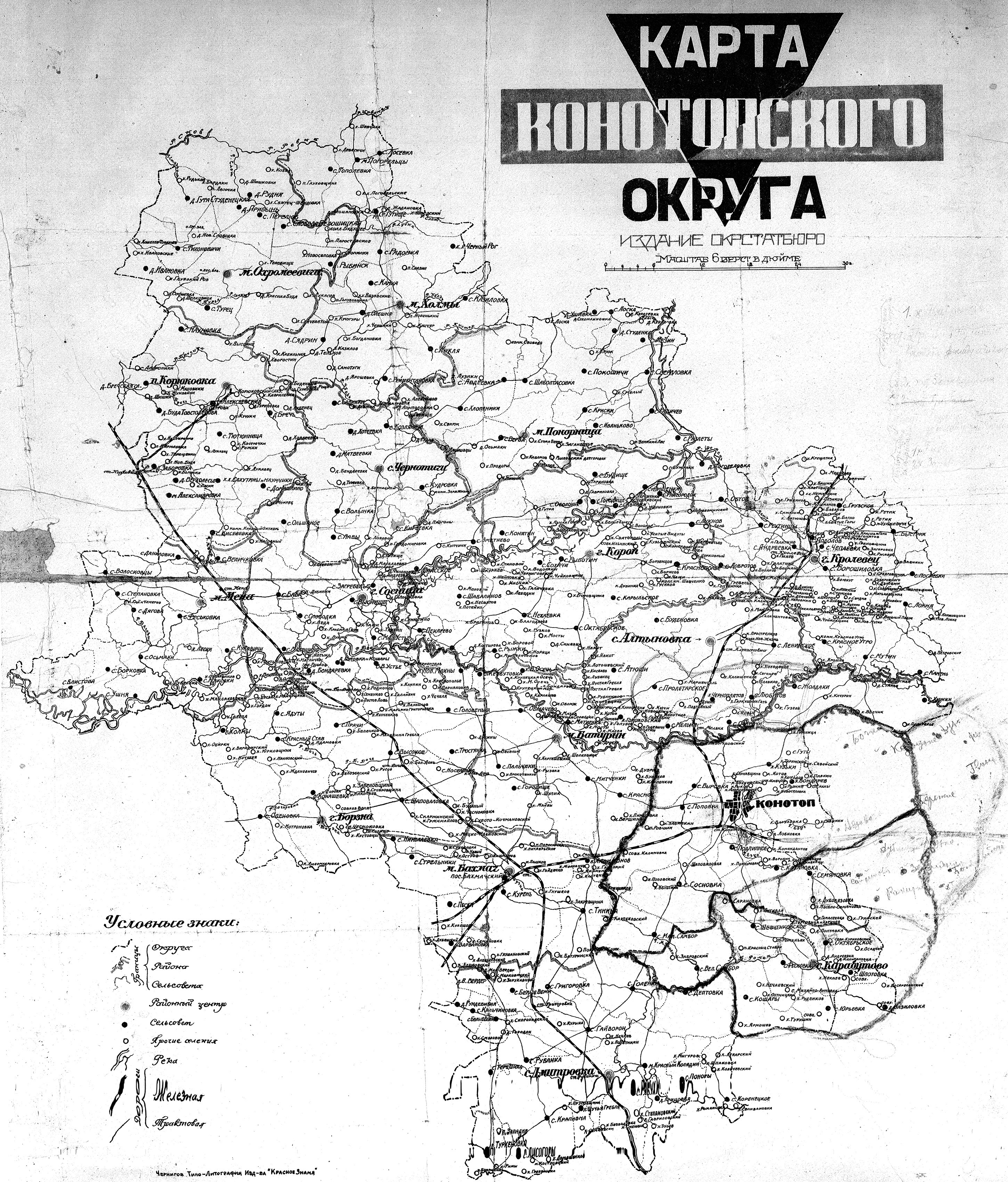
- Country: Soviet Union
- Republic: Ukrainian SSR
- Governorate: Chernihiv Governorate (1923–1925)
- Established: 7 March 1923
- Abolished: 2 September 1930
- Admin. center: Konotop

Population (1925)
  - Total: 588,000

Konotop Okruha (Ukrainian: Конотопська округа) was an okruha, a type of regional district, in the Ukrainian Soviet Socialist Republic between 1923 and 1930. Its administrative centre was located in Konotop.

== History ==
The okruha was created on 7 March 1923 as one of the divisions of Chernihiv Governorate. At the time of its creation, the okruha consisted of 11 raions. On 1 August 1925, the governorates of the Ukrainian SSR were all abolished, and Konotop Okruha became one of the first-level administrative divisions of the republic.

From 1924–1930, the bounds of the okruha changed multiple times. On 19 August 1925, some of the districts of Hlukhiv Okruha were transferred to Konotop Okruha. As of 1 October 1925, Konotop Okruha contained fifteen raions. On 16 October 1925, amidst a series of minor territorial exchanges between the Russian SFSR, the Ukrainian SSR, and the Byelorussian SSR, the former area of Putivlsky Uyezd (excluding the former territory of Kurnets Volost) was transferred from Kursk Governorate of the Russian SFSR to the Ukrainian SSR. The western portion of the territory was incorporated into Konotop Okruha, and the eastern portion was incorporated into Hlukhiv Okruha.

On 14 June 1930, the number of okruhas in the Ukrainian SSR was reduced. Among other changes, Hlukhiv Okruha was abolished, with its former territory transferred to Konotop Okruha. On 2 September 1930, Konotop Okruha itself was abolished.

== Demographics ==
As of 1 October 1925, Konotop Okruha had a population of around 588,000 people. According to the 1926 Soviet census, Konotop Okruha had a large majority of ethnic Ukrainians (94.5%), with small minorities of Jews (2.1%) and Russians (2.0%).
