= Okruhas of the Ukrainian Soviet Socialist Republic =

Administrative divisions of the Ukrainian SSR

Okruhas of the Ukrainian SSR
- Map of the okruhas in 1929–1930
- Category: Subdivision of a unitary state
- Location: Ukrainian SSR
- Created: 1918–1930
- Number: 40 (53 initially)
- Subdivisions: Raions (districts)

Okruhas in 1925 (after liquidation of Governorates of Ukraine)

An okruha (Ukrainian: округа) is a historical administrative division of the Ukrainian Soviet Socialist Republic that existed between 1923 and 1930. The system was intended as a transitional system between the Russian Imperial division of governorates and the modern equivalent of oblasts.

As a literal translation, the word okruha means vicinity or neighborhood (sharing a root with the words "circle" and "around", a close equivalent is the German term Bezirk). This level of subdivision is roughly equivalent to that of a county, parish, or borough. Okruhas were first established in 1918 when the Polissia Okruha and Taurida Okruha were created as temporary territories of the Ukrainian State of 1918.

== History ==
=== Formation ===
First okruhas, created just before 1918, were Polissia Okruha centered in Mozyr and Taurida Okruha centered in Berdiansk. Okruhas were first introduced on a widespread scale on April 12, 1923, at the 2nd session of the Central Executive Committee of Ukraine which accepted the declaration "About the administrative-territorial division of Ukraine". According to the declaration, the Ukrainian SSR was divided into 53 okruhas that included 706 raions, thus replacing the imperial division consisting of 102 povits (counties) that included 1989 volosts.

=== Reorganization of 1923–1926 ===
- September 25, 1923 Bohodukhiv Okruha changed name to Okhtyrka Okruha after transferring the okruha seat from Bohodukhiv to Okhtyrka
- March 7, 1924 Moldavian Autonomous Oblast was created out of Balta Okruha and Odesa Okruha of Odesa Governorate and Tulchyn Okruha of Podolia Governorate centered in the city of Balta
- June 6, 1924 Yuzivka Okruha changed name to Stalino Okruha after the okruha seat changed name from Yuzivka to Stalino
- August 7, 1924 Lysavethrad Okruha changed name to Zinovievsk Okruha after the okruha seat changed name from Lysavethrad to Zinovievsk
- August 12, 1924 Bakhmut Okruha changed name to Artemivsk Okruha after the okruha seat changed name from Bakhmut to Artemivsk
- October 1, 1924 Tahanrih (Taganrog) Okruha and Shakhty Okruha were transferred to the Russian SFSR
- October 12, 1924 Moldavian Autonomous Oblast was transformed into the Moldavian Autonomous Soviet Socialist Republic with the Ukrainian SSR
- October 28, 1924 Malyn Okruha was liquidated
- November 26, 1924 Balta Okruha was liquidated.
- June 3, 1925 the Ukrainian Central Executive Committee accepted the decision "About liquidation of governorates and transition to the three-level system of administration", according to which governorates were becoming liquidated on August 1, 1925, while June 15, 1925 eight (8) okruhas were to be liquidated as well. After the reform the Ukrainian SSR was divided into 41 okruhas and 680 raions.
- August 19, 1925 Novhorod-Siverskyi Okruha changed name to Hlukhiv Okruha after transferring the okruha seat from Novhorod-Siverskyi to Hlukhiv
- September 15, 1925 Zhytomyr Okruha was renamed to Volyn Okruha
- October 16, 1925 out of the Kursk Governorate to Ukraine were transferred several territories:
  - territory of the former Putivl uyezd (less Krupets volost)
  - Krinichanska volost of Graivoron uyezd
  - other two incomplete volosts of Graivoron and Belgorod uyezds
- June 16, 1926 Pavlohrad Okruha was split between Kharkiv Okruha (Lozova Raion) and Katerynoslav Okruha
- July 20, 1926 Katerynoslav Okruha changed name to Dnipropetrovsk Okruha after the okruha seat changed name from Katerynoslav to Dnipropetrovsk
- 1927 Cherkasy Okruha changed name to Shevchenko Okruha

=== Disestablishment ===
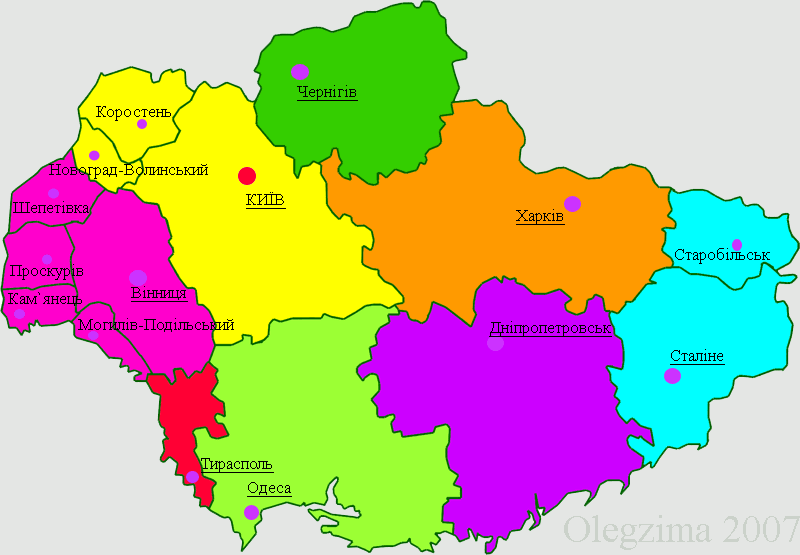
First oblasts of Ukraine at the end of 1932 including recently created Donetsk and Chernihiv oblasts.

On August 5, 1930, the "News of Central Executive Committee of Ukraine" reported that on August 3, 1930, there was a session of the Central Executive Committee of Ukraine Presidium chaired by Grigory Petrovsky where a report by Mykola Vasylenko on the liquidation of the system of okruhas was discussed. In the adopted resolution, the Presidium of the Central Executive Committee of Ukraine generally approved and endorsed the submitted projects from the government commission.

Likewise, the Presidium of Central Executive Committee of Ukraine generally approved the principle and order in the organization of local and central authorities. The Presidium requested that the commission and the Council of Commissars of the Ukrainian SSR, on the basis of the approved principles, develop a draft resolution on the liquidation of okruhas and the structure of authorities, both local and central, in connection with the transition to the rayon system.

== List of okruhas ==
=== Chernihiv Governorate ===
- Konotop Okruha
- Nizhyn Okruha
- Hlukhiv Okruha
- Snovsk Okruha (abolished in June 1925)
- Chernihiv Okruha

=== Donets Governorate ===
- Artemivsk Okruha (initially Bakhmut)
- Luhansk Okruha
- Mariupil Okruha
- Starobilsk Okruha
- Tahanrih Okruha
- Shakhty Okruha
- Stalino Okruha (initially Yuzivka Okruha)

=== Kharkov Governorate ===
- Okhtyrka Okruha (initially—Bohodukhiv, liquidated in June 1925)
- Izium Okruha
- Kupiansk Okruha
- Sumy Okruha
- Kharkiv Okruha

=== Kiev Governorate ===
- Berdychiv Okruha
- Bila Tserkva Okruha
- Kiev Okruha
- Malyn Okruha (abolished in October 1924)
- Uman Okruha
- Cherkasy Okruha
- Shevchenko Okruha (initially—Korsun; abolished in June 1925)

=== Odesa Governorate ===
- Balta Okruha (abolished in November 1924)
- Zinovievsk Okruha (initially—Lysavethrad)
- Mykolaiv Okruha
- Odesa Okruha
- Pershomaisk Okruha
- Kherson Okruha

=== Podolia Governorate ===
- Vinnytsia Okruha
- Haisyn Okruha (liquidated in June 1925)
- Kamianets Okruha
- Mohyliv Okruha
- Proskuriv Okruha
- Tulchyn Okruha

=== Poltava Governorate ===
- Zolotonosha Okruha (abolished in June 1925)
- Krasnohrad Okruha (initially—Kostiantynohrad, abolished in June 1925)
- Kremenchuk Okruha
- Lubny Okruha
- Poltava Okruha
- Pryluky Okruha
- Romny Okruha

=== Volhynian Governorate ===
- Zhytomyr Okruha
- Korosten Okruha
- Shepetivka Okruha

=== Yekaterinoslav Governorate ===
- Berdiansk Okruha (liquidated in June 1925)
- Zaporizhia Okruha
- Katerynoslav Okruha
- Kryvyi Rih Okruha
- Melitopol Okruha
- Oleksandriia Okruha (liquidated in June 1925)
- Pavlohrad Okruha

== See also ==
- Administrative division of Ukraine (1918)
- Administrative divisions of the Ukrainian Soviet Socialist Republic
- Administrative divisions of Ukraine (1918–1925)
- Administrative divisions of Ukraine (1925–1932)
