= Elected Cossacks =

Cossack rank

Elected Cossacks (Ukrainian: Виборні козаки, romanized: Vyborni kozaky) were Cossacks in Left-bank and Sloboda Ukraine, who were economically independent from various institutions and participated in military service using their own weapons. Elected Cossacks were separated as a group according to a 1701 universal of hetman Ivan Mazepa.

Elected Cossacks retained their freedom from taxation in exchange for their military service, meanwhile the rest of Cossack troops who were unable to finance their military service were to be made equal to commoners. However, due to mass protests and dissatisfaction of poorer Cossacks, this reform was initially introduced only in Nizhyn Regiment of the Cossack Hetmanate. Following the reforms of the Russian imperial government in 1734, Cossacks were divided into two groups: Elected Cossacks and Cossack helpers (pidpomichnyky). In the early 1780s many elected Cossacks were incorporated into the Russian Imperial Army, meanwhile others joined groups of commoners (see Malorossian Cossacks).

In Sloboda Ukraine elected Cossacks were introduced according to a decree of Tsar Peter I in 1700 as a hereditary class. All elected Cossacks had to serve in the army with their own equipment, horses and weapons. After the abolition of Sloboda regiments by Catherine II in 1765 elected Cossacks in the region changed their status to "military citizens" equal in status to state peasants.

== See also ==
- Registered Cossacks – a similar social estate in Ukraine under Polish-Lithuanian rule
