= Ostyorsky Uyezd =

Ostyorsky Uyezd (Russian: Остёрский уезд; Ukrainian: Остерський повіт, romanized: Osterskyi povit) was one of the subdivisions of the Chernigov Governorate of the Russian Empire. It was situated in the southwestern part of the governorate. Its administrative centre was Ostyor (Oster).

== Demographics ==
At the time of the Russian Empire Census of 1897, Ostyorsky Uyezd had a population of 150,358. Of these, 92.5% spoke Ukrainian, 4.2% Yiddish, 2.8% Russian, 0.2% Belarusian, 0.1% Polish, 0.1% Bashkir and 0.1% German as their native language.
