= Governor of Chernigov Governorate =

This is a comprehensive chronological list of governors of Chernigov Governorate.

== Governors ==
Governors were the chairmen of the regional executive committees.

- Sofia Sokolovska January 19, 1918 - March 12, 1918
- Ukrainian State
- Yuri Lapchynsky January 10, 1919 - April 13, 1919 as chairman of revkom
- Yuri Kotsyubynsky April 1919 - October 28, 1919
- Nikolai Avilov-Glebov October 28, 1919 - 1919 as chairman of revkom
- Danylo Petrovsky 1919 - 1920
- Tit Korzhykov May 5, 1920 - July 12, 1920 as chairman of revkom
- Tit Korzhykov July 12, 1920 - 1920
- Nikolai Filatov 1920
- Sergei Buzdalin September 7, 1920 - October 6, 1920 as chairman of revkom
- Panas Lyubchenko 1921
- Mykola Pakhomov 1921 - 1922
- Ivan Popov December 1922 - June 1924
- Stepan Vlasenko 1924 - ?

== Regional Communist party leaders ==
- Andrian Ryndich January 1919 - 1919
- Yuri Kotsyubynsky August 1919 - 1919
- Ivan Batyuk-Urusov 1919 - 1920
- Yakov Chubin 1920
- Andrian Ryndich 1920
- Fyodor Kremenitsky 1920 - 1921
- Oleksandr Odyntsov 1921
- Mark Tyomkin 1921
- Savva Taran 1924 - 1925

== Chekists and Chief of GPU ==
- Nikolai Gargayev October 1918 - January 1919
- S.Levchuk January 1919 - March 1919
- Nikolai Gargayev March 1919 - July 1919
- A.Rak July 1919 - August 1919
- Davs Rinkmanis August 1919 - October 1919 (also known as Pyotr Karpenko)
- Oleksandr Odyntsov October 1919 - November 1919
- Semyon Volsky November 1919 - January 1920
- Zarnitsyn January 1920 - February 1920
- P.Myshkin February 1920 - March 1920
- V.Abramov March 1920 - August 1920
- Yakov Lifshyts August 1920 - February 1921
- Janis Biksons February 1921 - January 1922
- Saveliy Tsyklis January 1922 - July 1923
- Abram Rosenbardt July 1923 - September 22, 1923 (also known as Aleksandr Rozanov)
- Vasiliy Zaborenko September 1923 - 1925

== See also ==
- Chernigov Governorate
