= Cossack helpers =

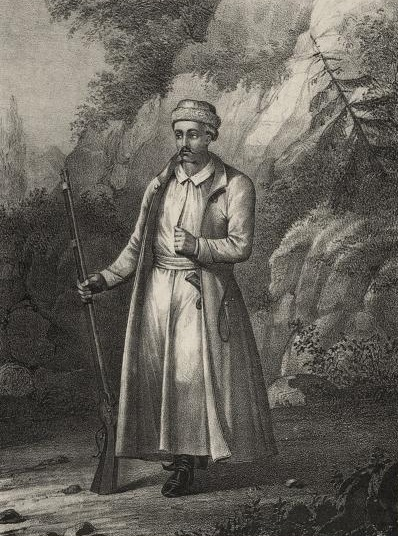
Depiction of a Cossack helper from the early 18th century

Cossack helpers (Ukrainian: підпомічники) was a category of Cossacks in Left-bank and Sloboda Ukraine, which emerged as a result of social stratification during the late 17th century and was officially defined in 1701 under the hetmanship of Ivan Mazepa.

The ranks of Cossack helpers consisted mostly of impoverished Cossacks with little land, who were unable to finance their own military service. Being less wealthy than Elected Cossacks, Cossack helpers were not subject to general military duty, but had to present and supply one Cossack trooper per several households. They were required to provide food, weapons, clothes, horses and other items to Elected Cossacks and mercenary troops. In addition, Cossack helpers were obliged to till the lands left by richer Cossacks due to their military service, served as guards and train drivers, performed other duties and had to pay taxes. In cases of emergency Cossack helpers could be mobilized for campaigns on par with other Cossacks.

The status of Cossack helpers in the Cossack Hetmanate was formally defined by unversals issued by hetman Ivan Mazepa in 1698 and 1701. In Sloboda Ukraine they were formally recognized as a group by a decree of tsar Peter I in 1700. The rights and duties of Cossack helpers in Left-bank Ukraine were defined by law in 1734-1736 according to decrees by governor prince Aleksei Shakhovskoy and the General Military Chancellery, which were confirmed by the Governing Senate.

During the mid-18th century, the absolute majority of Cossack helpers were poor, with richer and middle-rank Cossacks comprising less than 1% of their numbers. As of 1782, the total population of Cossack helpers reached 220,000. In Sloboda Ukraine the class was liquidated in 1765 with the abolition of regimental system, as rank-and-file Cossacks acquired the status of military citizens. In Left-bank Ukraine Cossack helpers lost their status during the early 1780s, and were turned into state peasants.
