= Elizaveta I. Gnevusheva =

Soviet historian and orientalist (1916-1994)

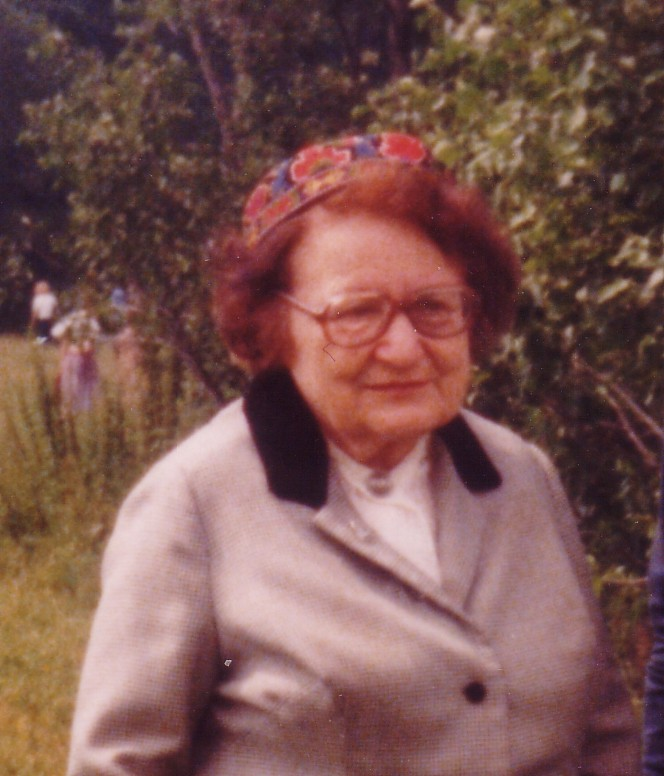
- Born: 28 January 1916; Surazh, Chernigov Governorate Russian Empire
- Died: 11 May 1994 (aged 78); Moscow, Russia
- Education: V.Potemkin Moscow City Pedagogical Institute (Ph.D.)
- Occupation: Historian
- Employer: Institute of Oriental Languages

Elizaveta Ivanovna Gnevusheva (28 January 1916, Surazh, Chernigov Governorate Russian Empire – 11 May 1994, Moscow) was a Soviet historian - orientalist, university lecturer, and publicist. In 1994, she was a recipient of the Prima Comexindo Prize.

== Biography ==
She was the daughter of an Orthodox priest. In 1941, she graduated from the Faculty of History of V.Potemkin Moscow City Pedagogical Institute and later she completed a postgraduate course there too. In 1948, she defended her Ph.D. thesis on the emergence of the Indian National Congress and then went to Kursk, where she taught history at Kursk Pedagogical Institute. Upon returning to Moscow (1952), she worked at Moscow Institute of Oriental Studies (1952–1953), at the history department of Moscow State University (1954-1955). Since 1956, her pedagogical and scientific activities had been closely associated with Institute of Oriental Languages at Moscow State University, where she worked for more than 30 years as an assistant professor at the department of the history of Southeast Asia and the Far East. After the death of her teacher A. A. Guber she acted as his biographer.

She was the author of several chapters on Indonesia in the university textbooks on the history of the Oriental countries. Her main scientific interests, however, were associated with Russian travellers and scholars who in the late 19th and early 20th centuries visited Dutch India, as well as some other territories of Asia and Africa. Some innovative articles on Vasily Panteleimonovich Malygin, who took part in the anti-colonial uprising against the Dutch on the Lombok island in the 1890s stand out in particular. She was also an active propagandist of the All-Russian Society for the Protection of Monuments of History and Culture. In 1970-1980's she supervised the restoration-and-construction student team of Moscow State University, which worked every summer in Suzdal. Some of her articles became the core of the feature novels.

== Awards ==
- Prima Comexindo Prize (1994)

== Impression ==
... "An enthusiastic listener to Guber's lectures at the history department of the Moscow Pedagogical Institute even before the war, his faithful student and attentive biographer, Elizaveta Ivanovna, has been remembered as a person of an active life position, an interested, consistent and energetic disciple of university science, didactics and culture " - Vladislav Remarchuk, head of the IAAS chair

== Major publications ==
- Budi Utomo: On the occasion of the 50th anniversary of the first national organization in Indonesia // Soviet Oriental Studies. - 1958. - No. 5.
- A Forgotten traveler. Life and Travels of P. I. Pashino. - M., 1958;
- V.P. Malygin - a troublemaker in the Dutch India // Voprosy Istorii. - M., 1969. - No. 11.
- In the country of the Three Thousand Islands (Russian scientists in Indonesia). - M., 1962.
- Gnevoesjeva E.J. De Levensgeschiedenis van W.P. Mamalyga (Malygin) - Rustverstoorder in Nederlands-Indie // Bijdragen tot de taal, -land - en volkerenkunde. 121 (1965), p. 303-349.
- The first review on European colonial politics and its author // Colonialism and the national liberation movement in the countries of Southeast Asia. - M., 1972.
- Russians in Malaya and on Malaya // Meetings with Malaysia. - Kuala Lumpur, 1974.
- Studies on the history of Southeast Asia at Moscow University // 225 years of Moscow University, 1979.
- Ethnographic collections of Estrin // Essays on the history of Russian ethnography, folklore and anthropology studies. - 1982. - Vol. 9 (co-authored with V. G. Trisman).
- Academician Alexander Andreevich Guber. - M., 1988.
- History of Indonesia. Volume 1. - M .: Moscow State University, 1992 (co-authored with G. G. Bandilenko, D.V. Deopik and V.A. Tsyganov)
- From the archive of E.I. Gnevusheva: Abstracts of the Report "On the State and Tasks of Oriental Philology" by A.A. Guber and A.S. Estrin's Memoirs Recorded by E.I. Gnevusheva // Malay-Indonesian Studies. Issue XX. In commemoration of the 50th Anniversary of the Malay-Indonesian Readings (1967-2017) and the 200th Anniversary of the IOS RAS (1919-2018). Editors Victor A. Pogadaev, Vilen V. Sikorsky. M., 2018.
