= Kozeletsky Uyezd =

Kozeletsky Uyezd (Russian: Козелецкий уезд; Ukrainian: Козелецький повіт, romanized: Kozeletskyi povit) was one of the subdivisions of the Chernigov Governorate of the Russian Empire. It was situated in the southwestern part of the governorate. Its administrative centre was Kozelets.

== Demographics ==
At the time of the Russian Empire Census of 1897, Kozeletsky Uyezd had a population of 135,129. Of these, 95.2% spoke Ukrainian, 3.5% Yiddish, 1.0% Russian and 0.1% Polish as their native language.
