= Chernigovsky Uyezd =

Subdivision of the Chernigov Governorate of the Russian Empire

Chernigovsky Uyezd or Uyezd of Chernigov (Russian: Черниговский уезд; Ukrainian: Чернігівський повіт) was one of the subdivisions of the Chernigov Governorate of the Russian Empire. It was situated in the southwestern part of the governorate. Its administrative centre was Chernigov (now Chernihiv, Ukraine).

== Demographics ==
At the time of the Russian Empire Census of 1897, Chernigovsky Uyezd had a population of 162,123. Of these, 86.1% spoke Ukrainian, 7.6% Yiddish, 5.6% Russian, 0.2% Polish, 0.2% Belarusian, 0.1% Tatar, 0.1% German and 0.1% Romani as their native language.
