= 1920 Russian census =

Population census in Russia in 1920

The 1920 All-Russian census (Russian: Всеросси́йская пе́репись населе́ния 1920 года) was carried out in August 1920 by a decree of the 7th All-Russian Congress of Soviets (December 1919). The Soviet Russian government (Central Executive Committee and Sovnarkom) ordered the Central Statistical Directorate of RSFSR to perform the census. It was carried out during the Russian Civil War when the state was in a disarray and some areas were not under control of Bolsheviks. Therefore, the census could cover estimated 72% of population. Preliminary results were published in 1920-1921 and final results in 1922–1923.

To satisfy the needs of several major governmental departments, three more censuses were processed carried the same year at about same time: agricultural census (data collected during September–October 1920, right after the population census by the same personnel), the brief account of industrial enterprises (industrial census) (in urban areas it was carried out together with the population census, in rural areas - together with the agricultural census), and the educational census, after the agricultural census.

The total population of the country was estimated by the results of the census and by the population estimates in the war areas, and constituted 134.2 million persons. Other sources give the number 136.8 million, of which urban population was 20.9 million or about 15%.

== See also ==
- Russian agricultural censuses of 1916 and 1917
