= Luhansk Okruha =

Luhansk Okruha Луганська округа
- Okruha
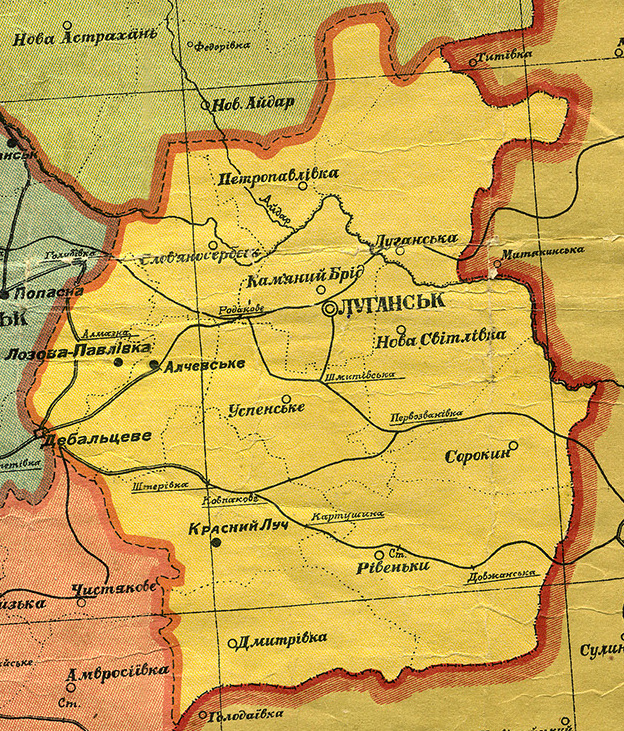
- Luhansk Okruha in 1925
- Country: Soviet Union
- Republic: Ukrainian SSR
- Governorate: Donets (1923–1925); None (1925–1930)
- Established: 7 March 1923
- Abolished: 2 September 1930
- Admin. center: Luhansk

Luhansk Okruha (Ukrainian: Луганська округа; Russian: Луганский округ) was an okruha of the Ukrainian Soviet Socialist Republic from 1923 to 1930. Its administrative center was the city Luhansk.

== History ==
Luhansk Okruha was established on 7 March 1923, originally within Donets Governorate. In June 1925, the governorate system was abolished in Ukraine and the districts became the first-level administrative divisions of the Ukrainian SSR. In June 1930, Starobilsk Okruha was abolished, and its former territory was merged into Luhansk Okruha. Luhansk Okruha itself was abolished on 2 September 1930, and its constituent raions became directly subordinated to the Ukrainian SSR.
