= 55th Rifle Division =

- Active: 1925–1944
- Country: Soviet Union
- Branch: Red Army
- Type: Division
- Role: Infantry
- Engagements: Operation Barbarossa; Battle of Kiev (1941); Demyansk Pocket; Battle of Kursk; Battle of Smolensk (1943); Battle of the Dnieper; Operation Bagration; Riga Offensive
- Decorations: Order of the Red Banner
- Battle honours: Mozyr

Commanders
- Notable commanders: Col. Dmitry Ivanovich Ivanyuk; Col. Gevork Andreevich Ter-Gasparyan; Maj. Gen. Ivan Pavlovich Shevchuk; Col. Nikolai Nikolaievich Zaiulev; Col. Kornei Mikhailovich Andrusenko

The 55th Rifle Division that served as a Red Army rifle division during the Great Patriotic War formed for the first time in September 1925 as a territorial division headquartered at Kursk. When the German invasion began the unit was as Slutsk, but soon came under attack from their armored spearheads and lost most of its strength within days, and was eventually encircled and destroyed at Kiev. A new division was formed along the Volga in December, and was soon sent north to join in the fighting around Demyansk until early 1943. In many respects the 55th was a hard-luck unit; after being destroyed once, it drew assignments to mostly secondary fronts in areas where, due to the terrain and other circumstances, no unit could distinguish itself. By early 1944, the division was reduced to minimal strength for an active formation, and after making some key gains in the pursuit phase of Operation Bagration it was transferred north to the Baltic States and then disbanded to provide replacements for the other units in 61st Army. Elements of the disbanded division were repurposed to other roles in coastal defense and as a naval base garrison, continuing in service until 1956.

== 1st Formation ==
A 55th Rifle Division was formed during the Russian Civil War at Petrograd in July 1919, but it was dissolved after the war. The unit that eventually fought in World War II began forming as a territorial (reserve) division in the Moscow Military District in September 1925. Its order of battle was as follows:

- 163rd Rifle Regiment, based at Belgorod
- 164th Rifle Regiment, based at Rylsk
- 165th Rifle Regiment, divisional headquarters, and 55th Light Artillery Regiment, based at Kursk

Due to its deployment, the division was known as the "Kursk" division from its beginning. At some point it also gained the distinction "in the name of K.Ye. Voroshilov". It was subordinated to the 10th Rifle Corps. On September 8, 1939, the 164th Regiment was detached to form the cadre of the new 113th Rifle Division at Rylsk, and its commander, Maj. Aleksandr Nikolaevich Nechaev, was appointed to lead it.

Later that year the division was part of the pre-war scrambling of the orders of battle of the Red Army, after which the OoB was as follows:

- 107th Rifle Regiment
- 111th Rifle Regiment
- 228th Rifle Regiment
- 84th Light Artillery Regiment
- 141st Howitzer Regiment
- 129th Antitank Battalion
- Reconnaissance Battalion - with one company of BT-7 tanks.

Following the Soviet invasion of Poland in September most of the division was assigned as the garrison of the Brest Fortress, while the remainder was stationed at Zhabinka. On February 21, 1940, Col. Dmitry Ivanovich Ivanyuk took command of the 55th. At the end of the year the division was relocated to Slutsk, and reassigned from 28th Rifle Corps to 47th Rifle Corps, where it remained in the reserves of Western Special Military District until the start of the German invasion. It was luckier than the divisions on the border, but was under orders to join 4th Army there in the event of war. In the event, the war came to the 55th, in the form of 2nd Panzer Group, within a week, chasing the remnants of the rest of 4th Army. Colonel Ivanyuk was killed in action on June 25, and succeeded by his deputy, Lt. Col. Gevork Andreevich Ter-Gasparyan, who was confirmed in command on July 14 and promoted to colonel.

By July 5 the 55th was again in 28th Rifle Corps of 4th Army, with just 800 infantrymen left in the entire division. By the end of July it was under 13th Army which had been shoved off to the south on the right flank of the panzer group's drive across the Dniepr River. In late August the division was assigned to 21st Army in Central Front. Starting on August 19 the 55th took part in several actions against Guderian's panzers in the Unecha region. By the 27th the division was still attacking the flanks of the German penetration while the army's commander reported on the alarming progress the Germans had made to the south. By this time the 55th was in 66th Rifle Corps, along with the 75th, 232nd and 266th Rifle Divisions, described as the "strongest corps in [the] army", indicating that the division had received at least some replacements. By the 29th, 21st Army was looking for the means to orchestrate a breakout attack to the east, and 66th Corps was being ordered to hold the line north of Chernigov.

In the end, the breakout was unsuccessful, and the division was effectively destroyed in the Kiev encirclement in September, although some men, such as Colonel Ter-Gasparyan, were able to escape. The division was officially dissolved on October 1.

== 2nd Formation ==
A new 55th Rifle Division began forming at Kuibyshev in the Volga Military District on December 12, 1941. Its order of battle remained similar to that of its previous formation. The rifle regiments and the antitank battalion retained the same numbers, the howitzer regiment was gone and the light artillery was now a standard artillery regiment, and in addition the following were under command:

- 46th Sapper Battalion
- 543rd Reconnaissance Company
- 21st Signal Company
- 35th Mortar Battalion (as of October 1942)

The division was under the command of Maj. Gen. Ivan Pavlovich Shevchuk. It remained in the Volga District until April 1942, when it was briefly assigned to the Reserve of the Supreme High Command, and then railed to the Northwestern Front. It remained in that Front until March 1943, in either 11th or 27th Army, taking part in the grueling and dismal fighting around the Demyansk Pocket.

General Shevchuk was not a success in his role as divisional commander. He had distinguished himself during the Russian Civil War in the Far East as commander of the 1st Tungussk Partisan Detachment, winning the Order of the Red Banner in 1928, and up to 1938 served as acting chief of the Construction Section of the Pacific Fleet. This was not adequate experience to lead a division in modern warfare and Shevchuk was out of his depth. As a result, he was overly "coarse" in his dealings with his subordinates; as well, his unskillful leadership led to excessive casualties during the offensive fighting in May 1942. In consequence, Shevchuk was brought before an 11th Army military tribunal. He was relieved of command of the division on May 10, being replaced by Col. Nikolai Nikolaievich Zaiulev, but due to his status as a Civil War hero he kept his rank and was appointed as deputy commander of the 241st Rifle Division. In the following months Shevchuk displayed excessive and ostentatious foolhardiness in combat situations, which seemed to indicate he was courting death to atone for his disgrace. If so, he got his wish on October 28, when he embarked on a mounted reconnaissance of the division's frontage. His horse stepped on a German landmine, which killed the horse and blew off both of his legs; he died a few hours later and was buried the next day with full military honors. Colonel Zaiulev remained in command of the 55th until January 21, 1944.

In November, concurrent with Operation Uranus and Operation Mars, Northwestern Front launched yet another offensive against the Demyansk Pocket. The 55th was in reserve of 11th Army and was not involved in the initial attacks, which were unsuccessful, but was ordered forward in December to renew the offensive. This also failed, and the pocket was not taken until the German forces evacuated in March 1943. Following this, the division went into the Reserve of the Supreme High Command and then to 53rd Army east of Kursk in April. When the Battle of Kursk began in July, the 55th was a separate division in 60th Army of Central Front, on the western face of the salient, and therefore saw little action. When the German offensive ended the division was temporarily transferred to 70th Army, and then in August, when the Soviet summer offensive began, it was assigned to 61st Army, where it would remain until it was disbanded. At this time it was also assigned to 29th Rifle Corps.

== Into Belarus and Disbandment ==
For most of the rest of its existence, the 55th was involved in the battles to liberate Belarus (Belorussia). In October, Central Front was renamed Belorussian Front. Prior to this, by September 30, the division had captured a small bridgehead across the Dniepr between Loyew and Radul. This bridgehead became the main staging area for the offensive that liberated Gomel in late November, although it involved regrouping the 55th into another bridgehead to the south. Prior to the Gomel-Rechitsa Offensive Operation in early November the division was reassigned to the 89th Rifle Corps, where it would remain until disbanded. The 55th deployed in the Kuchaevka-Domamerki sector in the first echelon alongside 15th Rifle Division. During the offensive, on November 28, the corps, supported by 2nd Guards Cavalry Corps, drove a wedge into German defenses on the approaches to Iurevichi on the Pripiat River but was unable to exploit further. A further offensive to try to liberate the German stronghold at Kalinkovichi began on December 8, with 89th Corps on the left flank of 61st Army's front. By this time both sides were exhausted, and although a few gains were made, the offensive was shut down on December 12.

On January 8, 1944, 61st and 65th Armies, the left wing of Belorussian Front, launched the Kalinkovichi-Mozyr Offensive, with the objective of liberating these two fortified towns and drive the German forces back at least to the Ipa River. Prior to the offensive the 2nd and 7th Guards Cavalry Corps were regrouped from east to south of Kalinkovichi, screened by 415th Rifle Division that was facing a scratch force of three German battle groups. When the offensive opened, the cavalry soon deeply outflanked the German forces in the western sector, but the main attacks of the two Soviet armies made little progress. In spite of this, the German grouping was in a very deep pocket, and after several days of fighting through very difficult terrain, the 55th, advancing westwards along the rail line south of Klinsk, linked up with the cavalry. On January 14 the division was recognized for this with the following honorific:

"MOZYR" - 55th Rifle Division (Colonel Zaiulev, Nikolai Nikolaievich)... The troops who participated in the liberation of Mozyr and Kalinkovichi, by the order of the Supreme High Command of January 14, 1944, and a commendation in Moscow, are given a salute of 20 artillery salvoes from 224 guns.

Col. Kornei Mikhailovich Andrusenko was given command of the division on January 22, and he would remain at that post for the duration of the 2nd formation.

By March, the 55th was severely worn down by this grim fighting in the Pripiat swamps and forests. Its rifle regiments had no rifle battalion structure left; each regiment consisted of four separate rifle companies, each of 90 men in three platoons and a section each of sub-machine gunners and heavy machine guns. Each regiment also had a single mortar and a single heavy machine gun company, plus a reconnaissance platoon. In short, the front line strength of the division was about half that of one full-strength rifle regiment.

At the start of Operation Bagration the division was still in the much-reduced 61st Army, in the western sector of the renamed 1st Belorussian Front, facing German 2nd Army along the south face of the Pripiat region. It played a limited role in the actual offensive, mostly holding the line and acting as a follow-on force as the Germans retreated. Before dawn on June 29 the Dniepr Flotilla's 2nd Brigade of river cutters landed forces of the 55th across the Pripyat River in the areas of Krukovichi and Belki, and in the Petrilov area a day later. Overcoming the enemy's resistance by the end of July 4 the division had taken the important railroad junction of Starushki and the town of Koptsevichi. As a result of this action, specifically its role in the liberation of Luninets, the division was awarded the Order of the Red Banner for "exemplary fulfillment of command tasks" and its "valor and courage" on July 23. It then went into the Reserve of the Supreme High Command in late July, along with the rest of its army, through August and September, moving north to join 3rd Baltic Front in the vicinity of Riga.

In late 1944 the Red Army was facing a manpower "crunch" as most men available were going into the new artillery and other support units rather than the rifle divisions. In consequence of this, on October 7 the division was broken up in 61st Army to provide replacements for the other units in the army. At the time of its disbandment, the division carried the official title of 55th Rifle, Mozyr, Order of the Red Banner Division. (Russian: 55-я стрелковая Мозырьская Краснознамённая дивизия.)

== Descendant formations ==
On November 1, 1944, the headquarters and other assets of the division were converted into the 1st Mozyr Red Banner Naval Infantry Division of the Baltic Fleet at Oranienbaum. Its subordinate units were renumbered. The 107th Rifle Regiment became the 1st Regiment, the 111th Rifle Regiment became the 2nd Regiment, and the 228th became the 3rd Regiment. The 185th Tank Regiment became the 1st Tank Regiment and the 84th Artillery became the 1st Artillery. The division formed the garrison of the Porkkala Naval Base, which had been leased by Finland after the end of the Continuation War in September. In 1948, the division became the 1st Machine Gun Artillery Division of the Baltic Fleet. The 1st Regiment became the 51st Machine Gun Artillery Regiment, the 2nd Regiment the 54th, and the 3rd Regiment the 57th. The 1st Tank Regiment was renumbered as the 194th and the 1st Artillery was renumbered as the 414th. The 53rd and 60th Machine Gun Artillery Regiments were added to the division after being formed from ground units. The division included 16,000 soldiers, occupying 280 machine gun and 208 artillery bunkers. In 1955, negotiations for a Soviet withdrawal began, and the division began disbanding in August 1955. The process was completed in January 1956, when what remained of the division was disbanded at the Bobochinsky Camp in the Leningrad Military District.
