= Chernihiv Okruha =

Administrative unit in the Ukrainian SSR

Chernihiv Okruha (Ukrainian: Чернігівська округа) was an okruha (regional district) in 1923–1930 in northeastern Ukraine. Its administrative centre was located in Chernihiv.

The okruha was created in 1923 as part of the Chernigov Governorate. In 1925-1930 it served as a first-level administrative division within the Ukrainian SSR.

In 1926 okruha consisted of 15 raions.
