= Konotopsky Uyezd =

Subdivision of Chernigov Governorate, Russian Empire

Konotopsky Uyezd (Russian: Конотопский уезд, Ukrainian: Конотопський повіт) was one of the subdivisions of the Chernigov Governorate of the Russian Empire. It was situated in the southeastern part of the governorate. Its administrative centre was Konotop.

== Demographics ==
At the time of the Russian Empire Census of 1897, Konotopsky Uyezd had a population of 156,535. Of these, 90.9% spoke Ukrainian, 4.9% Yiddish, 3.4% Russian, 0.3% Belarusian, 0.3% Polish, 0.1% German and 0.1% Romani as their native language.
