= Nezhinsky Uyezd =

Nezhinsky Uyezd (Russian: Нежинский уезд; Ukrainian: Ніжинський повіт, romanized: Nizhynskyi povit) was one of the subdivisions of the Chernigov Governorate of the Russian Empire. It was situated in the southern part of the governorate. Its administrative centre was Nezhin (Nizhyn).

== Demographics ==
At the time of the Russian Empire Census of 1897, Nezhinsky Uyezd had a population of 162,123. Of these, 91.8% spoke Ukrainian, 5.9% Yiddish, 1.9% Russian, 0.2% Polish, 0.1% Belarusian and 0.1% German as their native language.
