= Krolevets =

City in Sumy Oblast, Ukraine

Krolevets Кролевець
- City
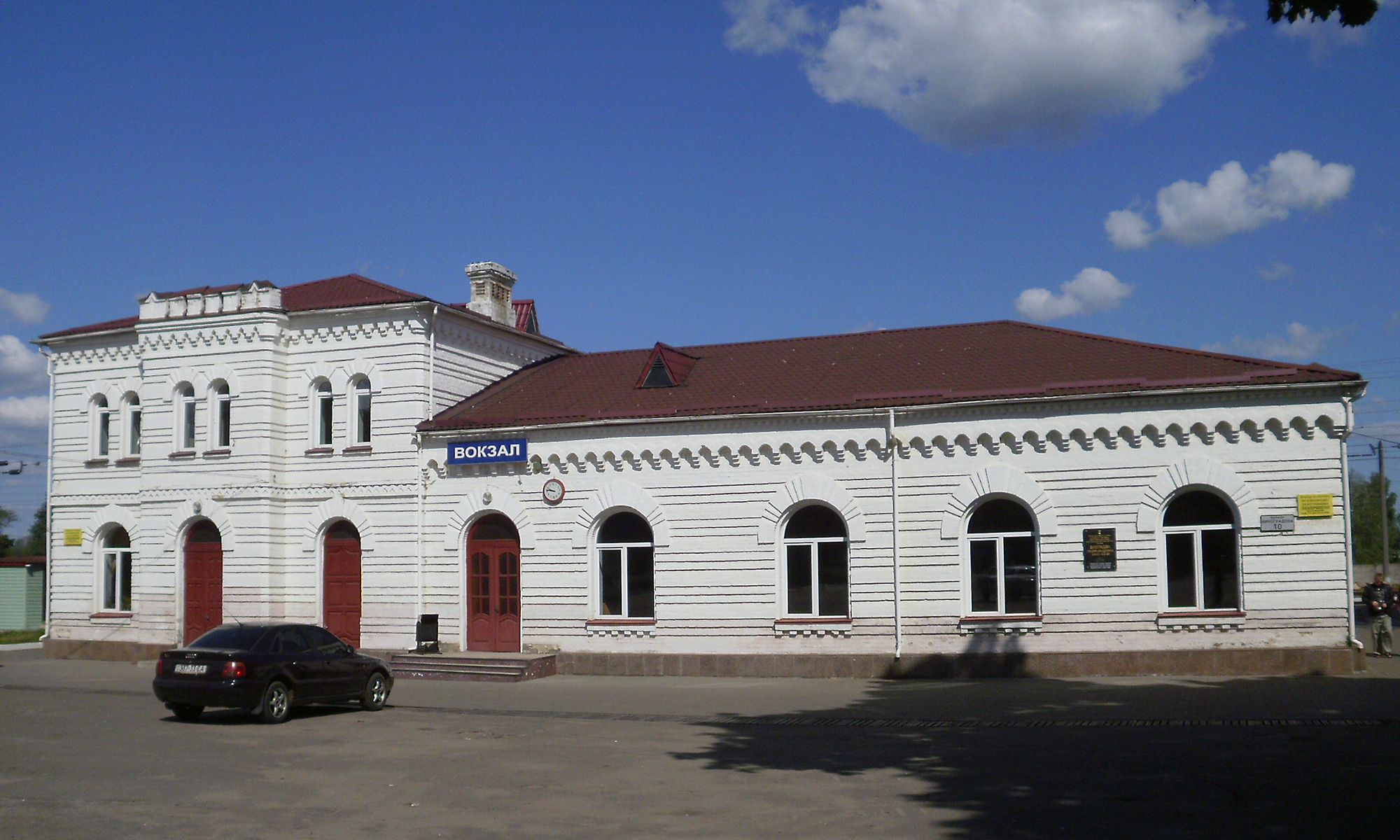
- Krolevets railway station

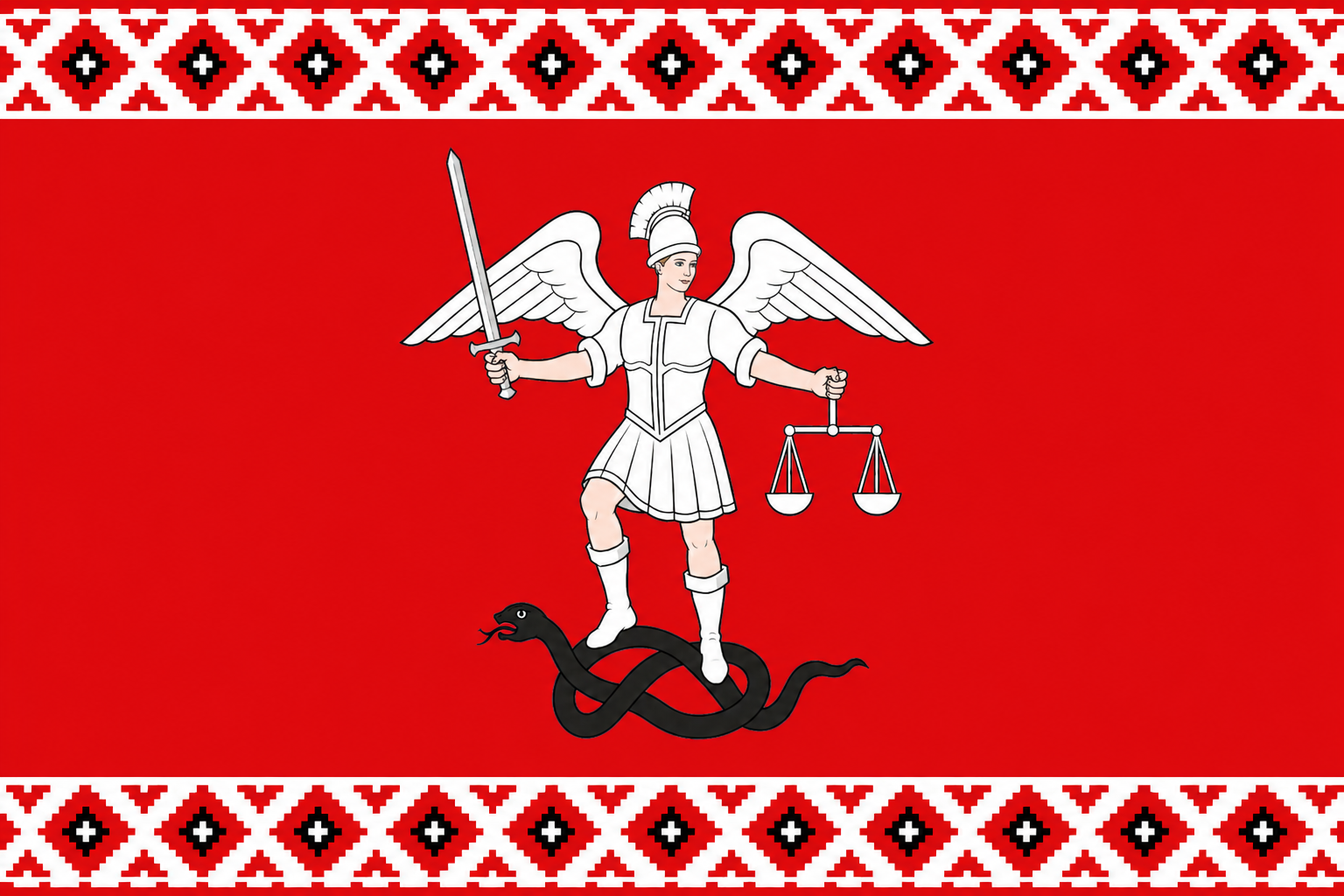
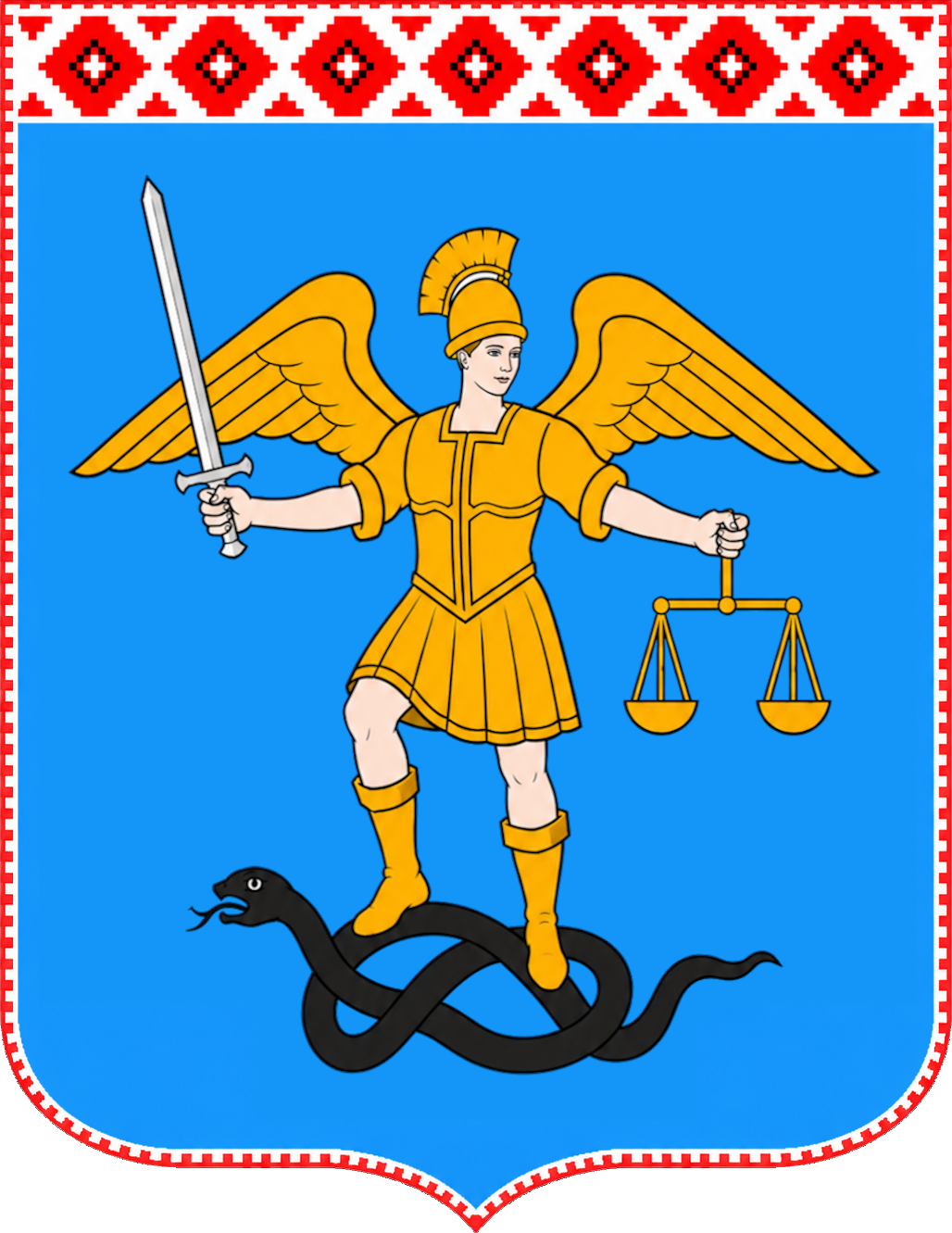
- Flag Coat of arms
- Interactive map of Krolevets
- Location of Krolevets Krolevets (Sumy Oblast)
- Coordinates: 51°33′0″N 33°23′0″E
- Country: Ukraine
- Oblast: Sumy Oblast
- Raion: Konotop Raion
- Hromada: Krolevets urban hromada
- Founded: 1601

Population (2022)
  - Total: 22,111
- Postal code: 41300
- Area code: +38 (05453)
- Website: http://www.krolevets.com

Krolevets (Ukrainian: Кролевець, [kroleˈwɛtsʲ]; see below for other names) is a city in Sumy Oblast, Ukraine. Population: 22,111 (2022 estimate). In 2024, the population was 20,132.

== Names ==
The city is also historically known by different names in other languages – Polish: Królewiec; Russian: Кролевец, romanized: Krolieviets.

== History ==
Historical affiliations

Polish–Lithuanian Commonwealth 1601–1648
Cossack Hetmanate 1648–1764
Russian Empire 1764–1917
Ukrainian People's Republic 1917–1918
Ukrainian State 1918
Ukrainian People's Republic 1918–1919
Soviet Ukraine 1919–1922
Soviet Union 1922–1991
Ukraine 1991–present

Named in honor of the Polish King Sigismund III, Krolevets was founded in 1601, and it was originally part of Poland. The original name was written as Krolewac (Krulevats). In 1644, it was granted Magdeburg city rights by Polish King Władysław IV Vasa. Krolevets was annexed by the Tsardom of Russia in 1667 (Truce of Andrusovo).

In 1802, it was incorporated into the Chernihiv Governorate. It hosted an annual fair in the late 19th century.

A local newspaper is published in the city since 1919.

During World War II, Krolevets was occupied by the German Army from 3 September 1941 to 1 September 1943.

== Population ==
=== Ethnicity ===
Ethnic composition according to the 2001 Ukrainian census:

Ethnic groups in Krolevets
	percent
Ukrainians	94.98%
Russians	4.39%
Belarusians	0.19%
others	0.12%

=== Language ===
Distribution of the population by native language according to the 2001 census:

Language	Number	Percentage
Ukrainian	23 884	95.14%
Russian	1 173	4.67%
Other or undecided	46	0.19%
Total	25 103	100.00%

== Transportation ==
Krolevets is situated on the Kyiv — Moscow railway and autoroute. Distance from Kyiv — approx. 260 km (161.56 mi). Distance to Russian border — approx. 80 km (49.71 mi).

== Nature ==
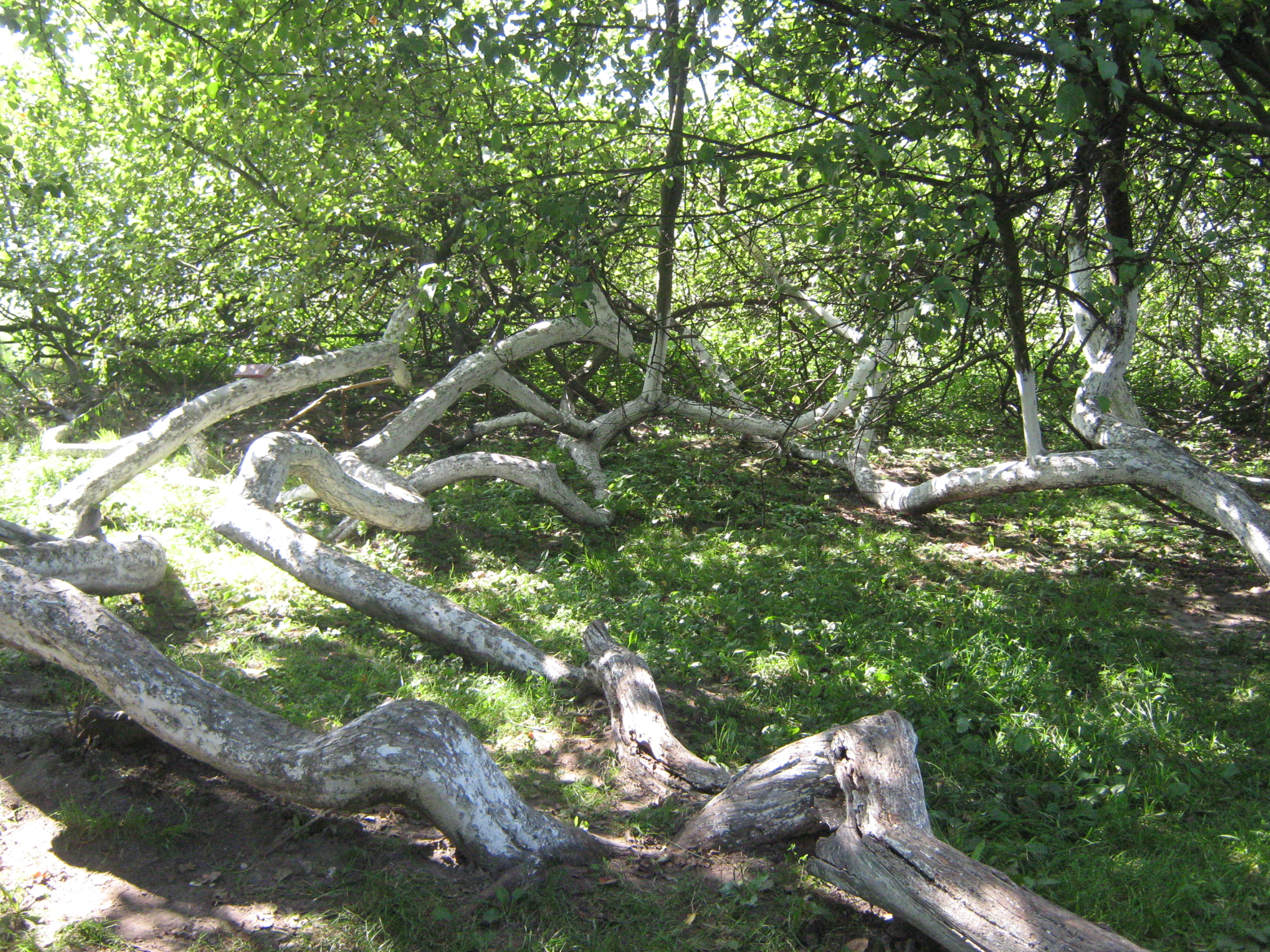
Unique apple tree growing in Krolevets

Krolevets is the location of a unique apple tree, which has self-propagated into a colony of fifteen family trees that combined cover an area of 1,000 sq. meters (10,763 sq. feet). This self-propagation, where drooping branches create new roots and trunks, has not been observed in other apple trees.
