= Nizhyn Okruha =

Administrative unit in the Ukrainian SSR

Nizhyn Okruha (Ukrainian: Ніжинська округа) was an okruha (regional district) in 1923–1930 in northeastern Ukraine. Its administrative centre was located in Nizhyn.

The okruha was created in 1923 as part of the Chernihiv Governorate. In 1925-1930 it served as a first-level administrative division within the Ukrainian SSR.

In 1926 okruha consisted of 12 raions.
