= Hlukhiv Okruha =

Subdivision of the Ukrainian SSR

Hlukhiv Okruha (Ukrainian: Глухівська округа) was an okruha (regional district) in 1923–1930 in northeastern Ukraine. Its administrative centre was located in Hlukhiv.

The okruha was created in 1923 as Novhorod-Siverskyi Okruha centered in Novhorod-Siverskyi and was part of the Chernihiv Governorate. In 1925-1930 it served as a first-level administrative division within the Ukrainian SSR. During that time on 19 September 1925 its administrative center was moved to Hlukhiv and the okruha was renamed accordingly. Also couple of its raions were transferred to the neighboring Konotop Okruha. On 16 October 1925 Hlukhiv Okruha was expanded after to its territory was added a territory of the former Putivl County out of Oryol Governorate of the Russian SFSR as well as several border villages of the same governorate from other former counties. On 19 April 1926 more villages of the Oryol Governorate were added to the okruha. In 1926 the Hlukhiv Okruha consisted of 11 raions.
