= Borznyansky Uyezd =

Uyezd of Chernigov Governorate, Russian Empire

Borznyansky Uyezd (Russian: Борзнянский уезд; Ukrainian: Борзнянський повіт, romanized: Borznianskyi povit) was one of the subdivisions of the Chernigov Governorate of the Russian Empire. It was situated in the southern part of the governorate. Its administrative centre was Borzna.

== Demographics ==
At the time of the Russian Empire Census of 1897, Borznyansky Uyezd had a population of 146,595. Of these, 93.8% spoke Ukrainian, 3.0% German, 2.5% Yiddish, 0.6% Russian, 0.1% Polish and 0.1% Belarusian as their native language.
