= Chernigov Governorate =

1802–1925 unit of Russia and Ukraine

Coordinates: 51.5°N 31.3°E

Chernigov Governorate Chernihiv Governorate Черниговская губерния (Russian) Чернігівська губернія (Ukrainian)
- Governorate of the Russian Empire (1802–1917) and Ukrainian successor states (1917–1925) (Note: as Chernihiv Governorate)
- 1802–1925
- Coat of arms

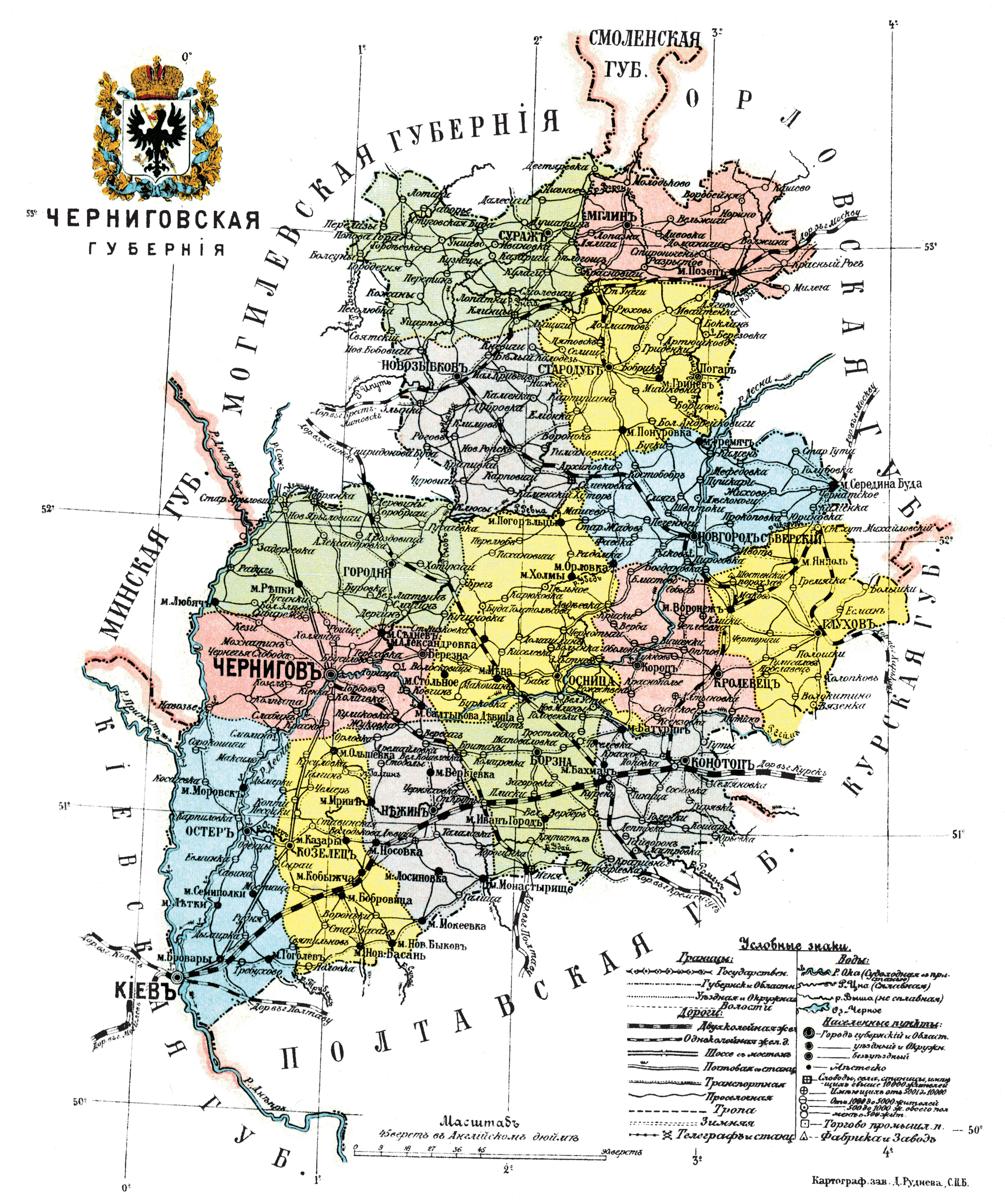
- Chernigov Governorate in 1913
- Location in the Russian Empire
- Capital: Chernigov (Note: Chernihiv in Ukrainian)
- Area
  - (1897): 52,396 km^{2} (20,230 sq mi)
- Population
  - (1897): 2,298,000
- History
  - Established: 1802
  - Abolished: 1925
- Political subdivisions: uezds: 15 (1802-1918); 18 (1918–19); 11 (1919–23); 5 okruhas (1923–25)
Preceded by
Little Russia Governorate (1796–1802)
Succeeded by
Chernihiv Okruha
Hlukhiv Okruha
Konotop Okruha
Nizhyn Okruha
Gomel Governorate
- Today part of: Bryansk Oblast; Chernihiv Oblast; Kyiv Oblast; Sumy Oblast

Chernigov Governorate (Note: Russian: Черниговская губерния, pre-1918: Черниговская губернія, romanized: Chernigovskaya guberniya) was an administrative-territorial unit (guberniya) of the Russian Empire. It was officially created in 1802 from the disbanded Little Russia Governorate and had its capital in Chernigov.

Its borders encompassed the modern Chernihiv Oblast, but also included a large section of Sumy Oblast and smaller sections of the Kyiv Oblast of Ukraine, in addition to a large part of Bryansk Oblast of Russia.

From 1918 to 1925, it was referred to as Chernihiv Governorate (Note: Ukrainian: Чернігівська губернія, romanized: Chernihivska huberniia) as part of Ukrainian successor states of the Russian Empire during and after the civil war, namely of the Ukrainian People's Republic, the Ukrainian State and the Ukrainian SSR.

== Administrative division ==
When part of the Russian Empire, the governorate consisted of 15 uyezds (their administrative centres in brackets):

- Borznyansky Uyezd (Borzna)
- Glukhovsky Uezd (Hlukhiv)
- Gorodnyansky Uyezd (Gorodnya/Horodnia)
- Kozeletsky Uyezd (Kozelets)
- Konotopsky Uyezd (Konotop)
- Krolevetsky Uyezd (Krolevets)
- Mglinsky Uyezd (Mglin)
- Nezhinsky Uyezd (Nezhin/Nizhyn)
- Novgorod-Seversky Uyezd (Novgorod-Seversky/Novhorod-Siverskyi)
- Novozybkovsky Uyezd (Novozybkov)
- Ostyorsky Uyezd (Ostyor/Oster)
- Sosnitsky Uyezd (Sosnitsa/Sosnytsia)
- Starodubsky Uyezd (Starodub)
- Surazhsky Uyezd (Surazh)
- Chernigovsky Uyezd (Chernigov/Chernihiv)

Of these, 11 were in territory inhabited by Ukrainians: Borzna, Hlukhiv, Horodnia, Kozelets, Konotop, Krolovets, Nizhyn, Novhorod-Siverksyi, Oster, Sosnytsia, and Chernihiv.

Chernigov Governorate covered a total area of 52,396 km², and had a population of 2,298,000, according to the 1897 Russian Empire census. In 1914, the population was 2,340,000. In 1918 it became part of Ukraine and transformed into Chernihiv Governorate.

As part of the Ukrainian State and the Ukrainian SSR, the governorate consisted of 18 counties (povits):

- Borzna County
- Hlukhiv County
- Horodnya County
- Homel County (added from the Mogilev Governorate)
- Kozelets County
- Konotop County
- Krolevets County
- Nizhyn County
- Novhorod-Siversky County
- Oster County
- Putyvl County (added from the Kursk Governorate)
- Rylsk County (added from the Kursk Governorate)
- Sosnytsia County
- Chernihiv County
- Mhlyn County
- Novozybkiv County
- Starodub County
- Surazh County

In 1919, the northern Mhlyn, Novozybkiv, Starodub, and Surazh counties, with their mixed Ukrainian–Belarusian–Russian population, were transferred from Ukraine to the newly established Gomel Governorate of the Russian republic.

In 1925, the governorate’s territory was redistributed among Hlukhiv, Konotop, Nizhyn, and Chernihiv districts (okruhas).

== Principal cities ==
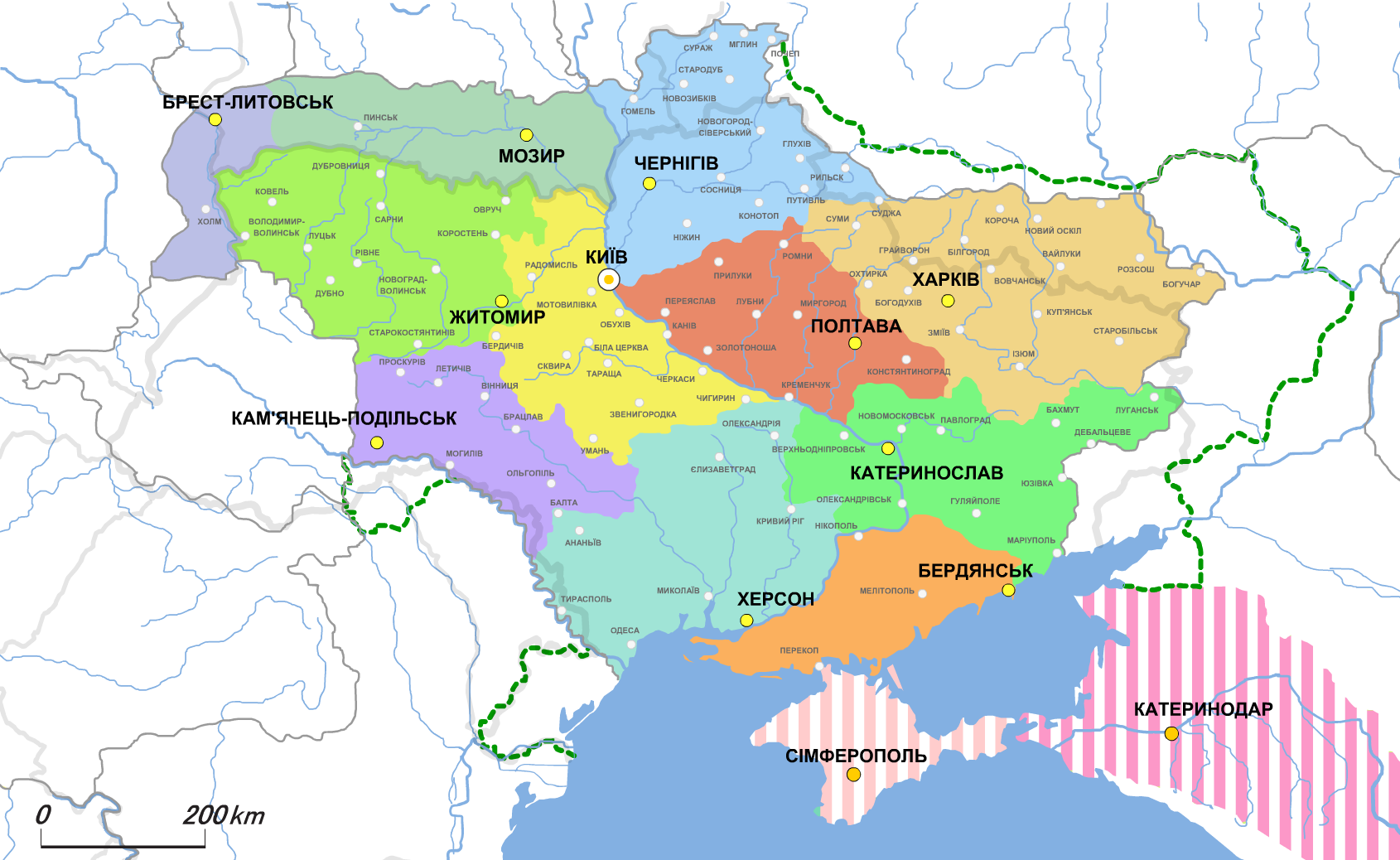
Chernihiv Governorate (blue) in the Ukrainian State

At the times of the Russian Census of 1897:

- Nezhin – 32,113 (Ukrainian – 21,733, Jewish – 7,578, Russian – 2,366)
- Chernigov – 27,716 (Ukrainian – 10,085, Jewish – 8,780, Russian – 7,985)
- Konotop – 18,770 (Ukrainian – 10,290, Jewish – 4,415, Russian – 3,565)
- Novozybkov – 15,362 (Russian – 11,055, Jewish – 3,787, Belarusian – 303)
- Hlukhiv – 14,828 (Ukrainian – 8,621, Jewish – 3,837, Russian – 2,217)
- Borzna – 12,526 (Ukrainian – 10,846, Jewish – 1,515, Russian – 109)
- Starodub – 12,381 (Russian – 7,255, Jewish – 4,897, Ukrainian – 133)
- Krolevets – 10,384 (Ukrainian – 8,328, Jewish – 1,815, Russian – 209)
- Berezna – 9,922 (Ukrainian – 8,349, Jewish – 1,354, Russian – 144)
- Novgorod-Seversky – 9,182 (Ukrainian – 4,884, Jewish – 2,941, Russian – 1,296)
- Mglin – 7,640 (Russian – 4,840, Jewish – 2,675, Belarusian – 75)
- Sosnytsia – 7,087 (Ukrainian – 5,068, Jewish – 1,840, Russian – 158)
- Korop – 6,262 (Ukrainian – 5,309, Jewish – 865, Russian – 77)
- Oster – 5,370 (Ukrainian – 3,229, Jewish – 1,596, Russian – 399)
- Kozelets – 5,141 (Ukrainian – 2,834, Jewish – 1,632, Russian – 468)
- Pogar – 4,965 (Russian – 3,800, Jewish – 1,159, Germans – 6)
- Gorodnya – 4,310 (Ukrainian – 2,349, Jewish – 1,248, Russian – 604)
- Surazh – 4,006 (Jewish – 2,400, Belarusian – 978, Russian – 559)
- Novoye Mesto – 1,488 (Russian – 1,421, Jewish – 67)

== Language ==
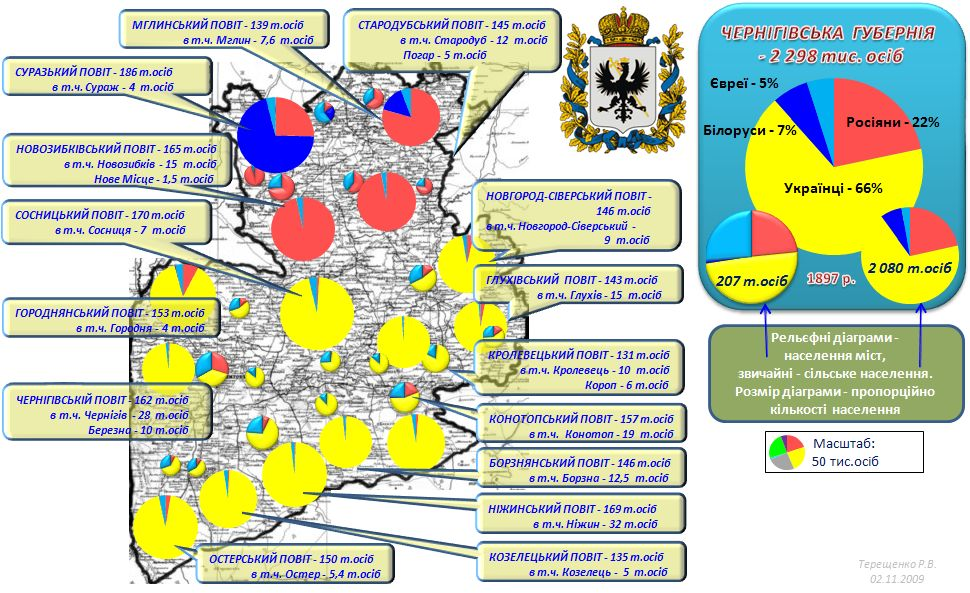
Imperial census of 1897.

At the time of the Imperial census of 1897. In bold are languages spoken by more people than the state language.

Language	Number	percentage (%)	males	females
**Ukrainian**	1,526,072	66.41	747,721	778,351
Russian	495,963	21.58	236,842	259,121
Belarusian	151,465	6.59	73,691	77,774
Yiddish	113,787	4.95	54,724	59,063
German	5,306	0.23	2,664	2,642
Polish	3,302	0.14	1,775	1,527
Persons that didn't name their native language	74	>0.01	32	42
Other	1,885	>0.01	1,247	638
Total	2,297,854	100	1,118,696	1,179,158

== Notable people ==
- Yehuda Leib Tsirelson (1859–1941), Rabbi, philosopher, member of the Parliament of Romania, acting Mayor of Chisinau
- Elizaveta I. Gnevusheva (1916–1994), historian, orientalist, university lecturer, publicist
- Dmitry Ivanyuk (1900–1941), Red Army colonel who was killed in World War II
- Dmytro Doroshenko (1882-1951), Ukrainian historian, gubernial commissar of Chernihiv under the Ukrainian People's Republic

== See also ==
- List of governors of Chernigov Governorate
