= Nikolay Perovsky =

Nikolay Ivanovich Perovsky
- Николай Иванович Перовский
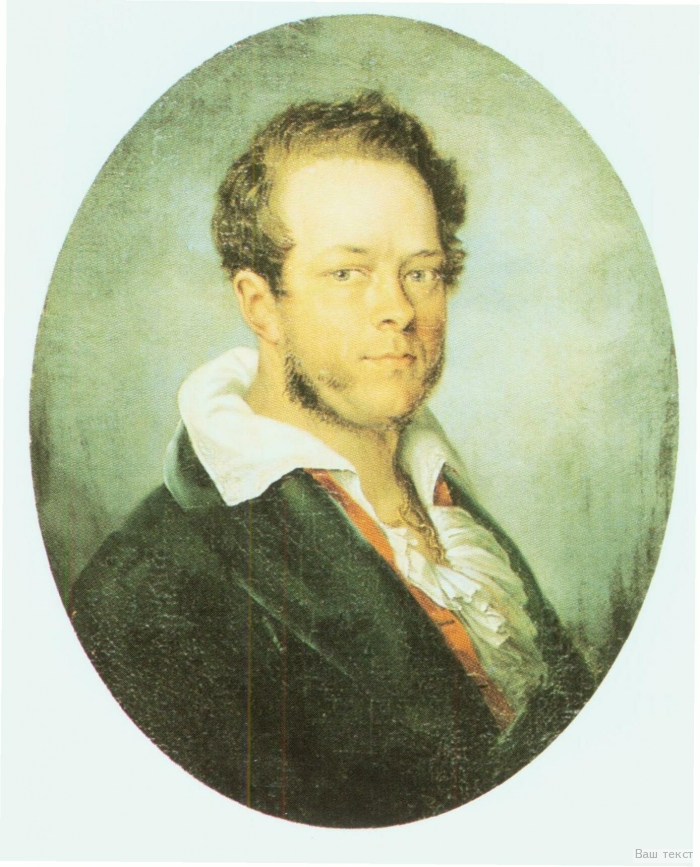

6th Governor of Taurida
- In office 1822–1823
- Preceded by: Aleksandr Baranov
- Succeeded by: Dmitry Naryshkin

Personal details
- Born: 1785 Russian Empire
- Died: 22 April 1858 (aged 72–73) Belbek (now Fruktove), Simferopol Uyezd, Taurida Governorate, Russian Empire
- Relations: Perovskys
- Children: Leo (1818–1890); Peter (1818–1865)
- Parents: Alexey Razumovsky (father); Maria Sobolevskaya (mother)

Nikolay Ivanovich Perovsky (Russian: Никола́й Ива́нович Перо́вский; 1785 – 22 April 1858) was an Active State Councillor, Governor of Taurida, Mayor of Feodosia, eldest son of Count Alexey Razumovsky, grandfather of Sophia Perovskaya.

== Biography ==
Perovsky was brought up in the house of his aunt Natalya Zagryazhskaya and in 1799, he entered the service of the State College of Foreign Affairs as a student, being included in the Constantinople mission; in 1801 (1 January) he travelled to the Vienna mission, and then (in 1803, 31 August) – to the Dresden mission.

In 1805 Perovsky joined the embassy of Count Yury Golovkin to China, as one of the embassy's seven noblemen, which also included Filipp Vigel. After serving a very short time in military service (in the Sumy Dragoon Regiment), Perovsky was again enrolled in the Department of the Collegium of Foreign Affairs and in 1811 was assigned to serve under the Kherson military governor, handling foreign correspondence.

Having transferred to the service in the Ministry of Finance, Perovsky was appointed as an official in the State Chancellery of the Russian Empire and on 20 November 1812, was appointed to the commission for drafting laws. In 1816, by imperial command, he travelled to Amsterdam to countersign private bonds on a Dutch loan, which he did with success.

=== In Crimea ===
On 28 May 1817, Perovsky was appointed Vice-Governor of Taurida and promoted to state councilor; on 25 May 1820, he became Mayor of Feodosia, and two years later, on 25 February 1822, he was appointed Governor of Taurida, while retaining his post as Mayor of Feodosia. During this period he became acquainted with Konstantin Batyushkov, who lived at that time in the Crimea and was ill. Perovsky arranged for his medical care, and then with his doctor sent him to Saint Petersburg.

On 30 March 1822, Perovsky was promoted to Active State Councillor, and shortly after that, on 16 October 1823, he was dismissed from the post of Governor of Taurida, while remaining Mayor of Feodosia. He departed on annual leave on 23 April 1824 and did not return to the office. By the highest decree on March 24, 1825, was ranked among the College of Foreign Affairs.

After retiring, Perovsky lived in his estate "Alkadar" in the village of Belbek (now Fruktove), Simferopol Uyezd, Taurida Governorate, where he died on 22 April 1858.

== Sources ==
- Alekseevsky B. Perovsky, Nikolay Ivanovich // Russian Biographical Dictionary: In 25 Volumes – Saint Petersburg – Moscow, 1896–1918
- Formulary List in the Archives of the Heraldry Department
- Archive of the Chapter of Orders, File of the 5th Section of the 3rd Table, 1858, No. 1, Pages 167–168
- "Russian Archive", 1890, April, Page 481
- Memories of Philipp Vigel;
- Prince Alexei Lobanov–Rostovsky, "Russian Genealogical Book", Volume 2, Saint Petersburg, 1895
- Works by Konstantin Batyushkov, Edited by Leonid Maikov and Vladimir Saitov. Saint Petersburg, 1887
