= Carole Lynne =

British theatre actress (1918–2008)

Helen Violet Carolyn Heyman
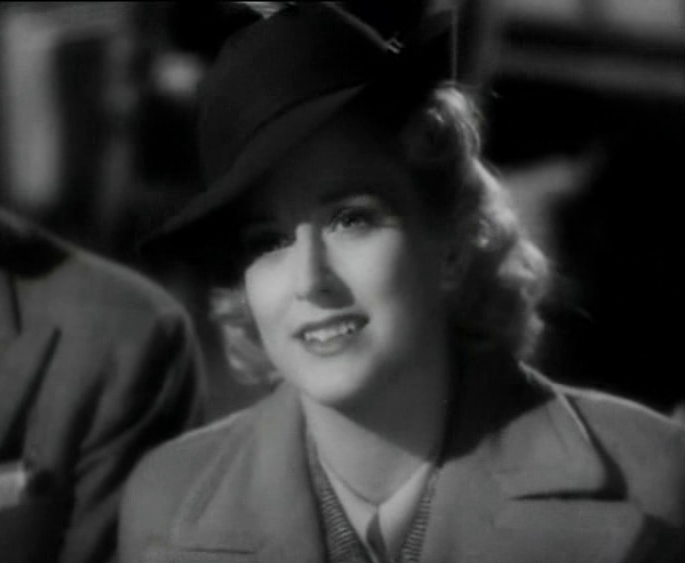
- Carole Lynne in The Ghost Train 3 (1941)
- Born: 16 September 1918; Rochester, Kent, England
- Died: 17 January 2008 (aged 89); Sussex, England
- Occupation: Actor
- Spouses: Derek Farr (m. 1939) Bernard Delfont (m. 1946; died 1994)
- Children: 3

Helen Violet Carolyn Delfont, Baroness Delfont (née Heyman; 16 September 1918 – 17 January 2008), known professionally as Carole Lynne, was a British theatre actress, best known for her work in the 1940s and 1950s. Until his death, she was married to the impresario Lord Bernard Delfont, a prominent figure in the British entertainment industry.

== Early life ==
Helen Violet Carolyn Heyman was born in Rochester, Kent on 16 September 1918. She made her stage acting debut at the age of 18 at His Majesty's Theatre as a chorus member in the production of Paprika, a Hungarian musical romance.

Her first husband was actor Derek Farr, whom she married in June 1939. The marriage ended in divorce. She married her second husband, Bernard Delfont, in 1946. They had met in 1942 when Richard Tauber cast her as Mary Fenton in Delfont's production of Old Chelsea. Tauber was best man at their wedding. Delfont was from a family of prominent people in the entertainment industry, who included his brothers, Lew Grade and Leslie Grade. The couple were together until Delfont's death in 1994.

== Career ==
Lynne was best known for headlining many theatre productions in London's West End during the 1940s and 1950s. Her film credits included The Ghost Train, a 1941 comic horror film starring Arthur Askey and Asking for Trouble, a 1942 Max Miller film. She retired from stage acting in the mid-1950s.

Her husband was knighted in 1974 for his charitable work, and created a life peer as Baron Delfont in 1976.

Lynne remained closely associated with entertainment-related charities throughout her life. She was the life governor of the Entertainment Artistes' Benevolent Fund, of which her husband, Lord Delfont, was life president.

She made her last television appearance in 1994 on an episode of This Is Your Life, which was featuring actress Pat Kirkwood. Lynne and Kirkwood had co-starred in Black Velvet at the London Hippodrome in 1939. Her performance with Kirkwood was one of her biggest successes. She was also in the Royal Box with Prince Charles at the 1994 Royal Variety Performance where Shirley Bassey was top of the bill.

== Death ==
Carole Lynne died at her home in Sussex, England, on 17 January 2008 at the age of 89, of motor neurone disease. She was survived by her son and two daughters.

== Selected stage credits ==
- Jenny Jones (1944)
