= Alexey Razumovsky (born 1748) =

Russian statesman

- Алексей Разумовский
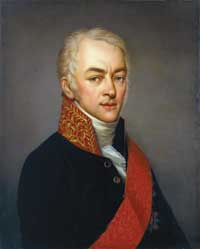

2nd Minister of Public Education of the Russian Empire
- In office 1810–1816
- Preceded by: Pyotr Zavadovsky
- Succeeded by: Alexander Golitsyn

Personal details
- Born: September 23, 1748 Saint Petersburg, Russian Empire
- Died: April 4, 1822 (aged 73) Pochep, Mglinsky Uyezd, Chernigov Governorate, Russian Empire
- Resting place: Novgorod–Seversky
- Spouse: Varvara Sheremeteva (1750–1824)
- Children: Antony Pogorelsky, Anna Perovskaya, Olga Perovskaya, Nikolay Perovsky, Varvara Repnina–Volkonskaya, Lev Perovsky, Ekaterina Razumovskaya
- Parent: Kirill Razumovsky (father)
- Awards: Order of Saint Vladimir; Order of Saint Alexander Nevsky

Count Alexey Kirillovich Razumovsky (Russian: Алексе́й Кири́ллович Разумо́вский; September 23, 1748 – April 4, 1822) was a Russian statesman from the Razumovsky Family. Son of Count Kirill Razumovsky from a marriage with Yekaterina Naryshkina, brother of Andrey Razumovsky; son–in–law of Count Peter Sheremetev (from 1774), father–in–law of Sergey Uvarov (from 1811).

Acting Chamberlain (1775), Senator (1776–1807), Minister of Public Education (1810–1816). Active Privy Councillor (1807). The builder of the Gorenki Estate near Moscow and the Palace on the Yauza. The ancestor of the Perovsky nobles: father of Antony Pogorelsky, grandfather of Alexey Tolstoy, great–grandfather of Sophia Perovskaya.

== Biography ==
The eldest son of Count Kirill Razumovsky, the last Hetman of the Zaporozhian Host, he received a thorough education: a special "institute" was set up for him with his brothers, in which Schlözer first introduced the teaching of statistics, under the name "Knowledge of Own Fatherland"; later he attended lectures at the University of Strasbourg. At first, he carried out only court service, in 1775, he was awarded the rank of acting chamberlain.

On June 27, 1786, he was appointed senator with the promotion to privy councillors. In 1795, due to a disagreement to approve the law proposed by the empress, Razumovsky resigned.

He re–entered service only in 1807. On November 2, 1807, Razumovsky was appointed a trustee of Moscow University, which, with the advice of his advice, entrusted him with the guardianship of the Moscow Educational District, and was promoted to Active Privy Councillors. In this position, he held a decree on the election of a rector for three years (instead of one year) and patronized the Society of Nature Experts, on whose behalf he formed an expedition to study the Moscow Governorate.

On January 1, 1810, Razumovsky was appointed Minister of Public Education and a member of the State Council. In the first two years of his activity, 72 parish schools, 24 district schools, several gymnasiums and other educational institutions were opened in this position; improved teaching; increased supervision over foreign educators; several scientific societies were opened; the first Department of Slavic Literature was established at Moscow University. With the personal assistance of Razumovsky, the charter of the Tsarskoye Selo Lyceum was developed and on October 19, 1811, it was opened.

Honorary Member of Moscow University (1812).

After 1812, he considerably cooled down to the service and for the last two years did not do business at all.

Being, before his appointment as minister, a member of the Masonic lodge and follower of Osip Pozdeev, with whom he had a long correspondence (it was published by Alexander Vasilchikov in his book "The Razumovsky Family"), since 1814, Razumovsky fell under the influence of the Jesuits and, mainly, the famous Count Joseph de Maistre. The latter "literally disposed of him, dictated what should be taught to Russians and what not to be taught"; at his direction, the Greek language, archaeology, natural history, astronomy, chemistry and the history of philosophical systems were thrown out of the original program of the Lyceum, as "not illuminating the mind with useful truths, but darkening with delusions and bewilderments". Introduced theology as the main discipline in all educational institutions. Under the influence of the same de Maistre, Razumovsky introduced new censorship restrictions and began a struggle with the trustee of the Vilna Educational District Adam Czartoryski for the Russification of the Western Region of Russia, of which de Maistre was a supporter. The failure in the fight against Czartoryski and the government's mistrust of the Jesuits forced Razumovsky to ask for resignation from the post of Minister and member of the State Council, which was given to him on August 10, 1816.

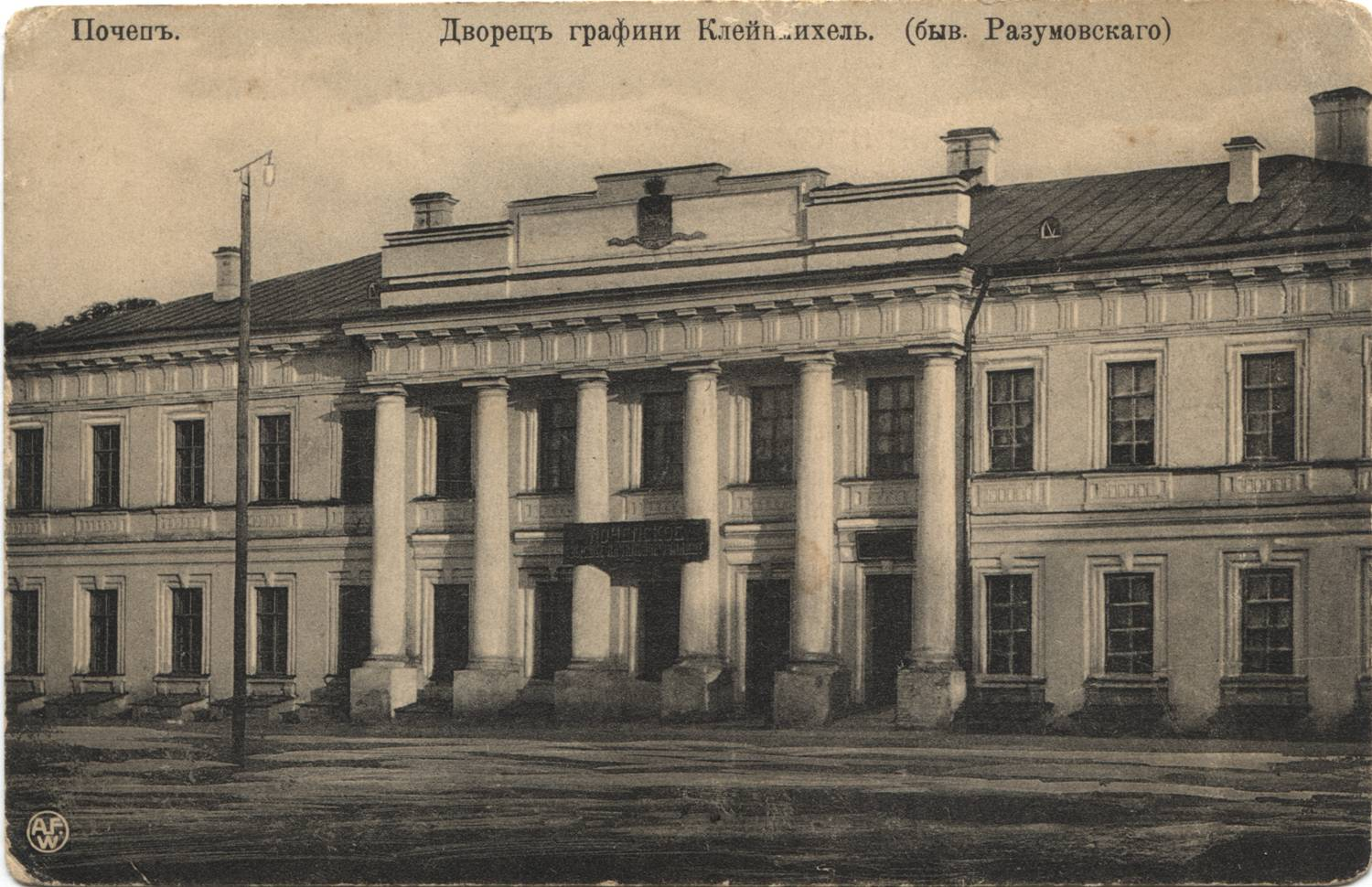
Palace of Alexey Razumovsky in Pochep

For the first two years after that, Razumovsky lived in Moscow and at his estate near Moscow, Gorenki, where he had a botanical garden, which until the 1830s was considered one of the wonders of Moscow. From 1816, he lived in Little Russia, in the town of Pochep, Mglinsky District, where he died. He was buried in the ancestral crypt, but then reburied in the Transfiguration Church of Novgorod–Seversky. According to Vigel, all the sons of Hetman Kirill Razumovsky "were stuffed with French literature, clothed in foreign forms, considered themselves Russian Montmorency, were amiable at court and intolerable outside of it aristocrats". To this, Prince Alexander Vasilchikov adds that the eldest of them, Alexey, was "an exorbitant pride ... and stern in the circle of his family".

== Family ==
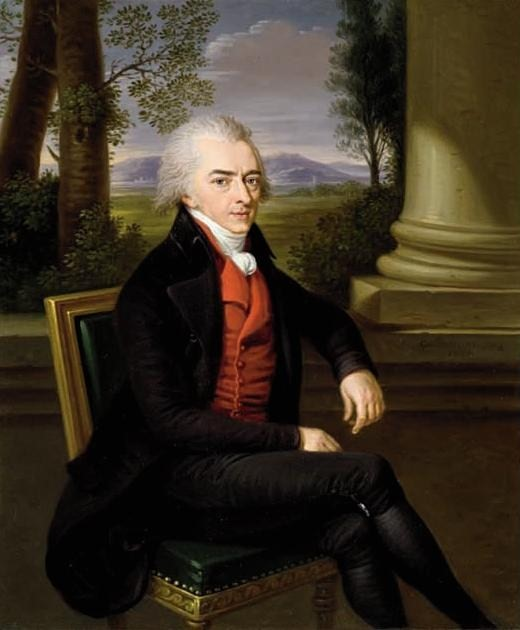
Alexey Razumovsky, 1801

Razumovsky was married on February 23, 1774, to one of the richest brides in Russia, Varvara Sheremeteva (January 2, 1750 – May 27, 1824), the second daughter of General–in–Chief Count Pyotr Sheremetev. Around 1784, at the request of her husband, Varvara Petrovna left her family and lived alone in her own house in Moscow – in 1796 a house on Maroseyka (No. 2) was completed. In marriage they had three daughters and two sons.

- Peter (1775–1835), in 1783 he was registered as a sergeant in the Izmailovsky regiment, studied abroad at the University of Göttingen; adjutant to his grandfather, Hetman Kirill Razumovsky; in 1797, Lieutenant Colonel, later Colonel, Commander of a Grenadier Battalion, in the army of his uncle, Infantry General Ivan Gudovich, a freemason. In 1801, he retired and was granted the title of acting chamberlain. While living in Saint Petersburg, he ran into a lot of debts, which prompted his father to seek to transfer his son to the service in Odessa, in 1806, in the rank of a Real State Councilor, he was appointed an Official for Special Assignments under the Novorossiysk Governor. He died in Odessa on July 18, 1835.
- Cyril (1777–1829), chamberlain, suffered from insanity, in 1806–1807, he was a prisoner of the Shlisselburg and Peter and Paul Fortresses, later he was transferred to the Spaso–Evfimiev Monastery, after the death of his father he was transported to Kharkov, where he died in 1829.
- Catherine (1777–1780).
- Varvara (1778–1864), since 1802, married to Prince Nikolai Repnin–Volkonsky; was a renowned philanthropist who did much for women's education.
- Catherine (1781–1849), beloved maid of honor of Empress Elizabeth Alekseevna and employee of the Patriotic Society. Since 1811, she was married to the trustee of the Saint Petersburg Educational District and the future Minister of Public Education, Count Sergey Uvarov.

Having got rid of his legal wife, Aleksey Kirillovich settled in his bourgeois woman Marya Sobolevskaya. He had ten illegitimate children, delicately called "pupils" (five sons and five daughters) – Perovskys.

- Nikolai (1785–1858), (the only one of ten children who bore the patronymic "Ivanovich") the Governor of the Crimea, mayor of Feodosia.
- Alexey (1787–1836), Russian writer (pseudonym – Anthony Pogorelsky), member of the Russian Academy.
- Maria (1791–1872), wife of General Maxim Kryzhanovsky, a Lady of Cavalry (1837).
- Lev (1792–1856), statesman, Minister of Internal Affairs, Minister of Appanages.
- Vasily (1795–1857), statesman and military leader, Cavalry General, Adjutant General, Governor–General of the Orenburg and Samara Provinces.
- Elizabeth (Praskovya) (1795–?).
- Anna (1796–1856), husband – Count Konstantin Tolstoy (1779–1870), son – Alexey Tolstoy.
- Olga (1798–1833), husband – Mikhail Zhemchuzhnikov, among the sons – Alexey, Alexander, Lev and Vladimir Zhemchuzhnikov.
- Sophia (1812–1883), husband – Vladimir Lvov.
- Boris (1815–1881), military and statesman, Adjutant General, member of the State Council.
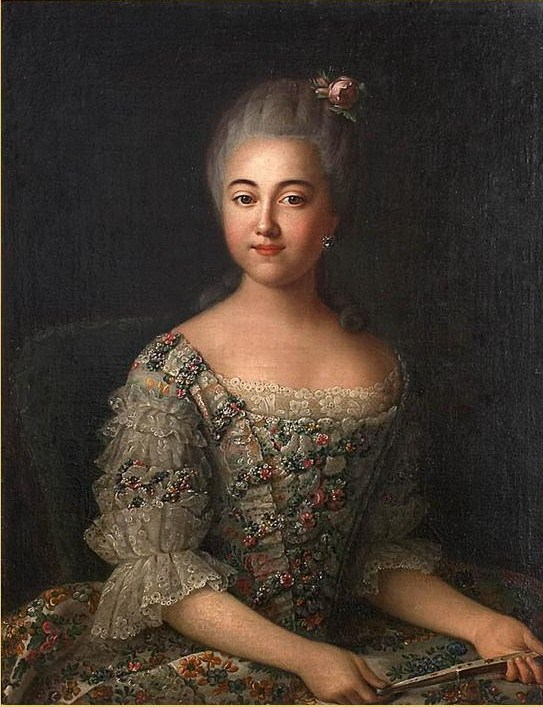
Varvara Petrovna, wife

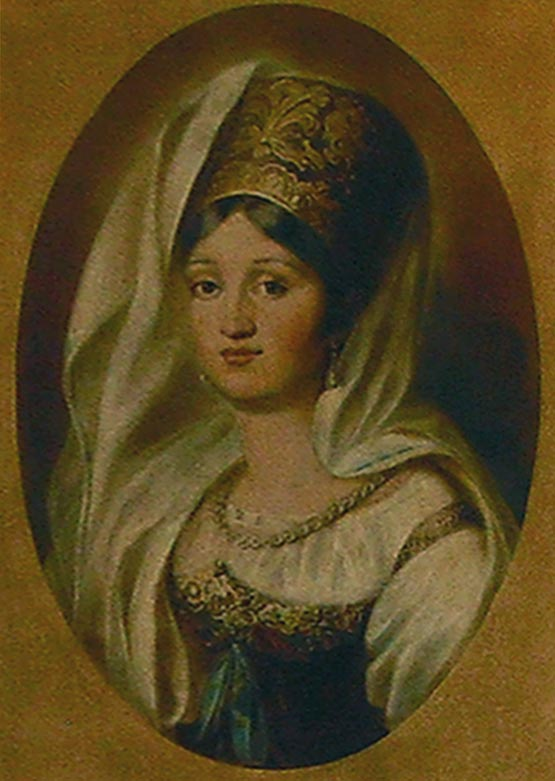
Varvara Alekseevna

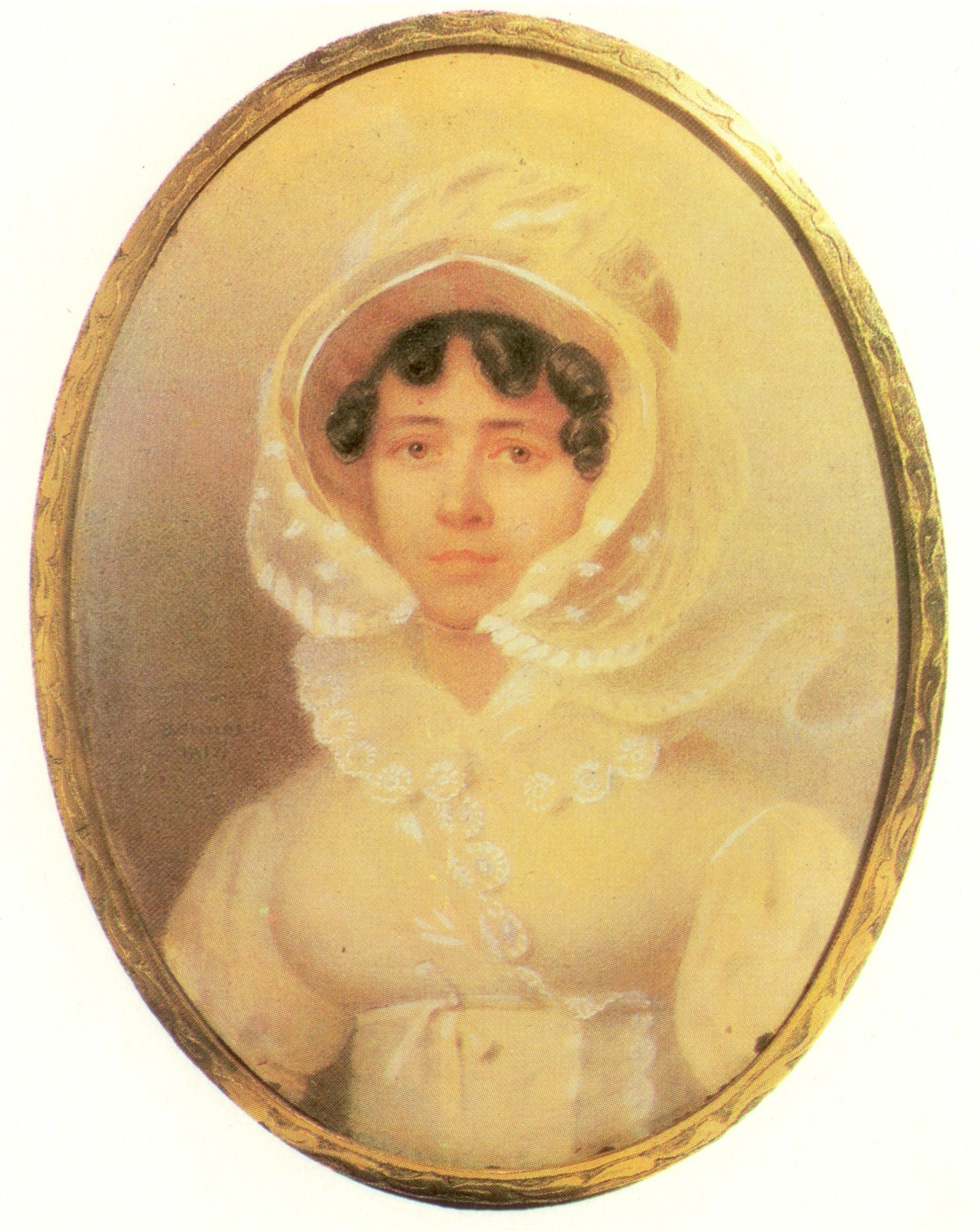
Ekaterina Alekseevna

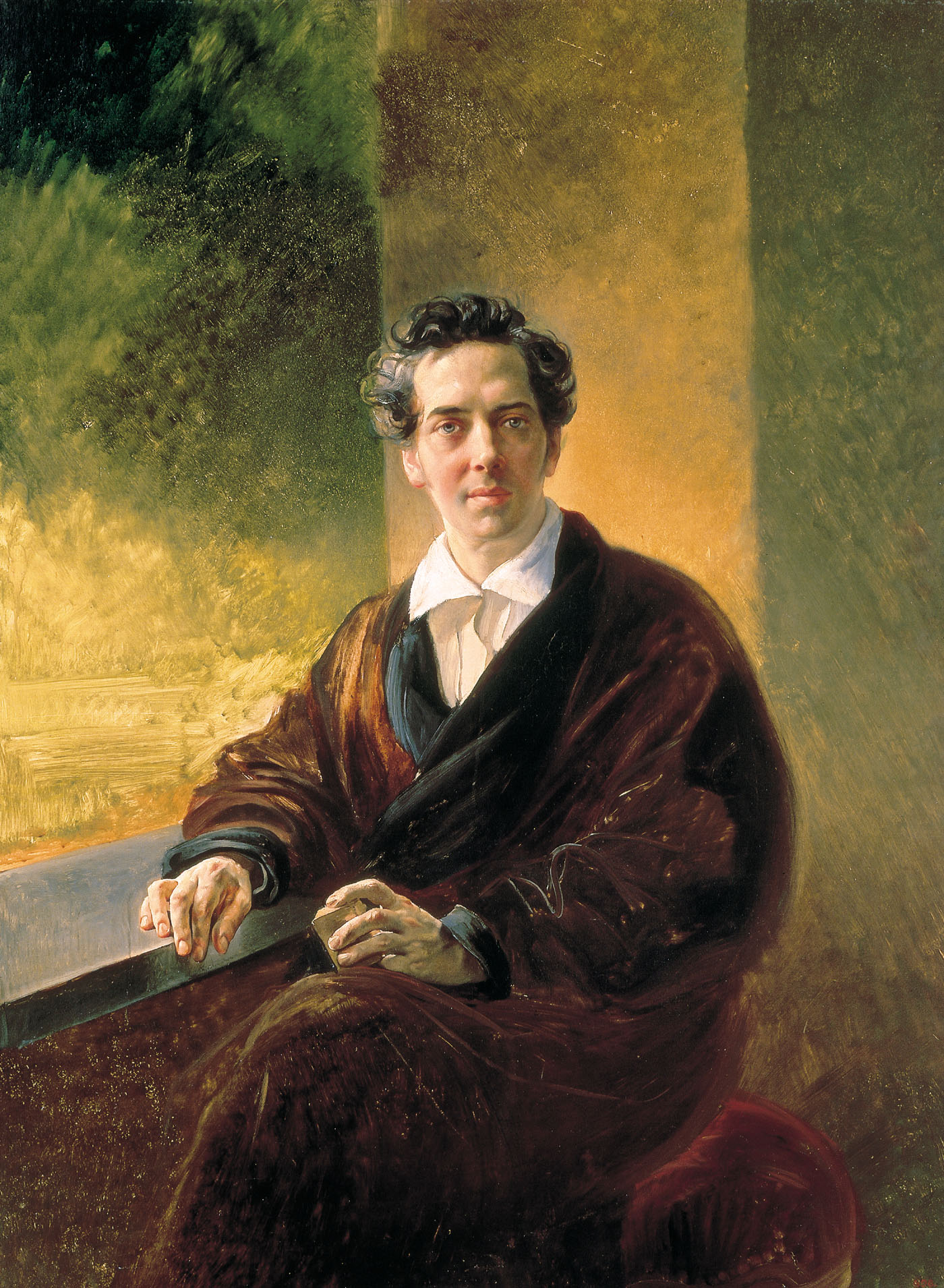
Alexey Perovsky

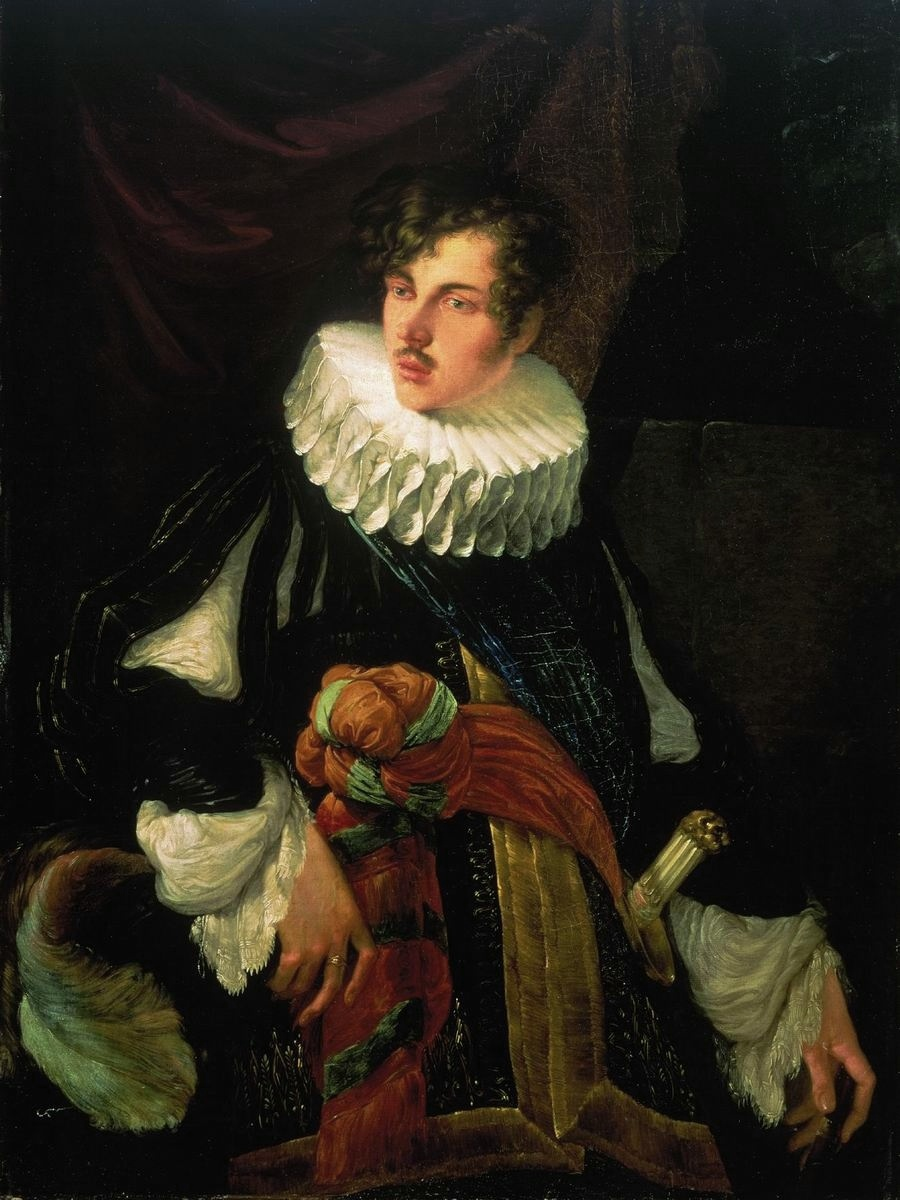
Vasily Perovsky

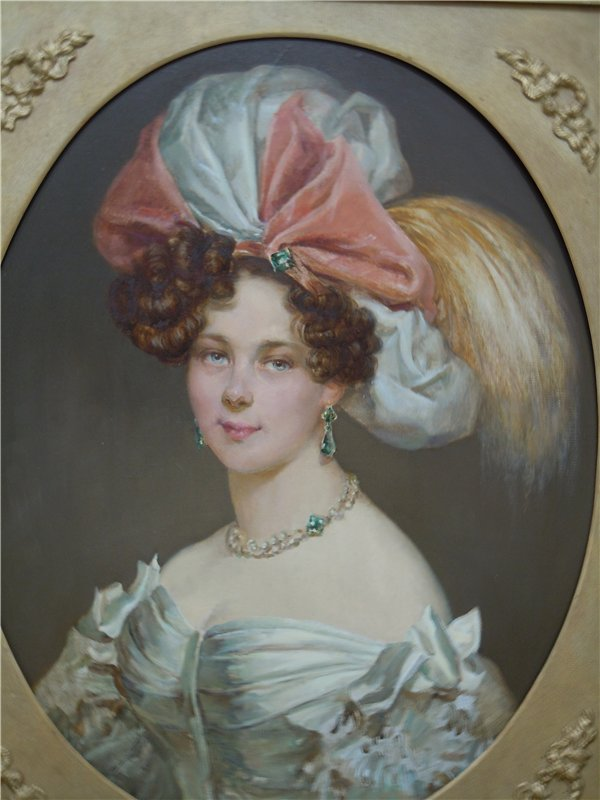
Anna Perovskaya

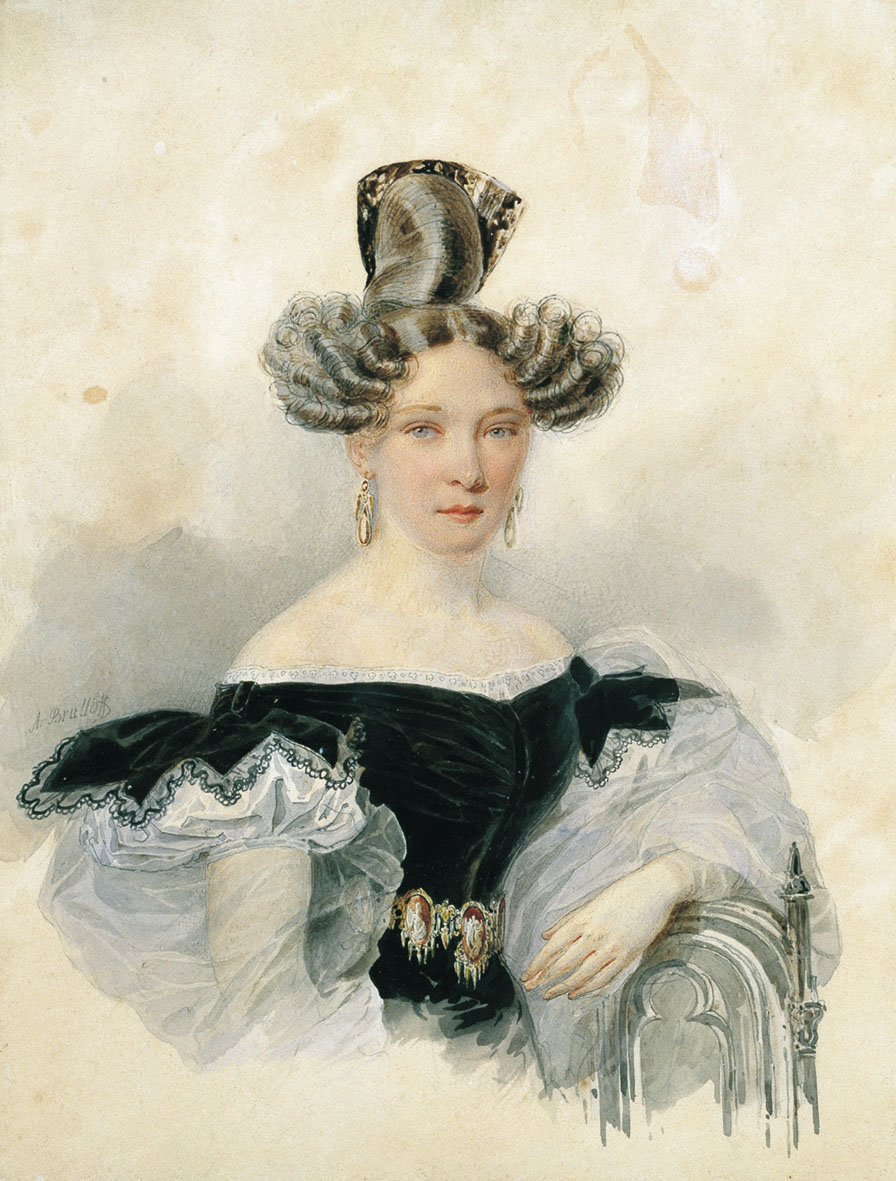
Sofia Perovskaya

== Awards ==
- Order of Saint Alexander Nevsky (April 14, 1808).
- Order of Saint Vladimir, First Class (October 25, 1811).

== Sources ==
- Alexander Vasilchikov. The Razumovsky Family
- Vasily Rudakov (1890–1907). "Разумовский, Алексей Кириллович". Brockhaus and Efron Encyclopedic Dictionary: In 86 Volumes (82 Volumes and 4 Additional Volumes) (in Russian). St. Petersburg: F. A. Brockhaus.
- Presidents of the Moscow Society of Naturalists – Participants of the Patriotic War of 1812
