= Bernard Delfont =

British theatrical impresario and media proprietor (1909–1994)

The Right Honourable The Lord Delfont
- Lord Delfont in 1964
- Born: Boris Isaakovich Winogradsky; 5 September 1909; Tokmak, Taurida Governorate, Russian Empire (present-day Tokmak, Zaporizhzhia Oblast, Ukraine)
- Died: 28 July 1994 (aged 84); Angmering, West Sussex, England
- Citizenship: United Kingdom (after 1912)
- Occupations: Impersario; media proprietor; business executive
- Spouse: Carole Lynne (m. 1946)
- Children: 3
- Relatives: Lew Grade (brother); Leslie Grade (brother); Michael Grade (nephew)
- Awards: Life peerage (1976); Knight Bachelor (1974)

Bernard Delfont, Baron Delfont (born Boris Isaakovich Winogradsky, Russian: Борис Исаакович Виноградский, romanized: Boris Isaakovich Vinogradskiy; 5 September 1909 [O.S. 18 September 1909] – 28 July 1994) was a Russian-born British theatrical impresario and media proprietor. He was the brother of fellow impresarios Lew and Leslie Grade, and was a prominent figure in British entertainment during the 20th-century.

== Life and career ==
=== Early years ===
Delfont was born in Tokmak, Berdyansky Uyezd, Taurida Governorate, Russian Empire (present-day Zaporizhzhia Oblast, Ukraine), the second son of Jewish parents Isaac and Olga Winogradsky. His brothers, Lew Grade (born Lev Winogradsky) and Leslie Grade (Laszlo Winogradsky), also entered show business and formed the Grade Organisation. Their sister, Rita Grade, later wrote a book about the family called My Fabulous Brothers: The Story of the Grade Family.

In 1912, the family moved to the East End of London and at age 12, Delfont left school and followed Lew into music halls and changed his name to Delfont to avoid confusion with his brother, forming a dance partnership with comic Hal Monty called The Delfont Boys. Unlike 'Grade', which was derived from the birth surname 'Winogradsky', it is unclear where the name 'Delfont' came from. Delfont later formed another dance partnership called Delfont & Toko. According to his biography East End, West End, in the late 1920s he performed a dance number in front of John Logie Baird's experimental television camera as a demonstration for potential backers.

In 1937, he stopped dancing and again followed Lew in becoming an agent and impresario.

=== Impresario ===
During World War II Delfont became involved in the theatre with a tour of Room for Two in 1941 and then started staging shows in London from 1942 with Jam Tomorrow at the St Martin's Theatre. He entered theatrical management in 1949 and acquired theatres in the West End of London. He acquired the London Casino and converted the London Hippodrome into the Talk of the Town nightclub, bringing in entertainers such as Lena Horne, Shirley Bassey, Frank Sinatra, Eartha Kitt, Judy Garland, The Ink Spots, Sophie Tucker, Barbra Streisand, Sammy Davis Jr. and Laurel & Hardy and also secured the exclusive rights from Paul Derval to stage the Folies Bergère for the first time outside Paris. He also teamed up with former rival Val Parnell to acquire a lease on the Prince of Wales Theatre and stage shows at the London Palladium. He presented over 200 shows in London and New York City, including more than 50 musicals, such as the original productions of Little Me, Stop the World - I Want to Get Off, City Of Angels, Funny Girl and Sweet Charity. He also presented summer variety shows in over 20 towns across the UK, mainly seaside resorts.

=== Television ===
In 1950, he became stage producer for a BBC summer variety show Carefree and soon after the launch of ITV, the variety show Bernard Delfont Presents was produced by Lew's Associated Television, which ran from 1956 to 1958. From 1959 to 1962, Bernard Delfont's Sunday Show was broadcast. Delfont was instrumental in bringing Morecambe & Wise to ITV in their first successful TV show, Two of a Kind (1961 to 1968). He also helped the careers of Tommy Steele, Danny La Rue, Norman Wisdom and Tommy Cooper.

By the 1960s, the brothers were all very successful and were said to have a "Gradopoly" over British popular entertainment, with Delfont the country's leading impresario; Leslie running the UK's biggest talent agency and Lew one of the major players in British commercial television.

=== EMI ===
In 1967, the Grade Organisation was acquired by EMI for $21 million and Delfont and his brothers joined the EMI board. When Leslie fell ill, Delfont was asked to help out at the Grade Organisation. As part of the deal, he became the largest individual shareholder in EMI. In 1969 he became chief executive of Associated British Picture Corporation after it was acquired by EMI and was a board member for around 30 entertainment entities, including the Blackpool Tower Company. In 1970, Delfont sold his own Bernard Delfont Organisation to EMI for $192,000, which increased his future shareholding in EMI to a value of around $8 million.

As head of EMI's leisure division, Delfont oversaw film production, including The Go-Between (1971), Murder on the Orient Express (1974), Death on the Nile and The Deer Hunter (both 1978). In that role he withdrew funding for the film Life of Brian in 1978 at the last moment owing to worries over the religious implications of the screenplay. Delfont was also part of the decision to move into film distribution in the USA, with disastrous consequences for EMI Films. He later became Chief Executive of EMI in 1979.

In 1980, following the sale of EMI's leisure interests to Trust House Forte, he became chief executive of THF Leisure Division. In 1983, he headed a management buyout under First Leisure Corporation where he was chairman until 1988 and then president. In Blackpool, First Leisure owned all three of its piers (South Pier, Central Pier and North Pier).

=== Other activities ===
He was an active supporter of the Variety Club of Great Britain and was a former president. He presented the annual Royal Variety Performance from 1958 to 1978, and saw its first television broadcast in 1960, which became a ratings hit. He was also involved in other entertainment charities being life president of the Entertainment Artistes' Benevolent Fund and president of the Entertainment Charities Fund from 1983 to 1991.

== Honours ==
Delfont was knighted in 1974 and created a life peer as Baron Delfont of Stepney in Greater London on 29 June 1976.

== Personal life ==
Delfont married the actress Carole Lynne in 1946. They had one son (David) and two daughters (Susannah and Jennifer).

=== Death ===
He died from a heart attack at his Angmering home in Sussex, England.

== Portrayals ==
In the 2018 film Stan & Ollie, which recounts the 1953 tour of the United Kingdom by Laurel & Hardy, he is portrayed by Rufus Jones.

He is played by Michael Gambon in the 2019 film Judy, which recounts Judy Garland's last days.

== Other appointments ==
- Companion of the Grand Order of Water Rats
- Member of Saints and Sinners
- Printers Charitable Corporation
  - President 1979
