= Dmitry Naryshkin =

Soviet military officer and politician (1792–1831)

Dmitry Vasilyevich Naryshkin
- Дмитрий Васильевич Нарышкин
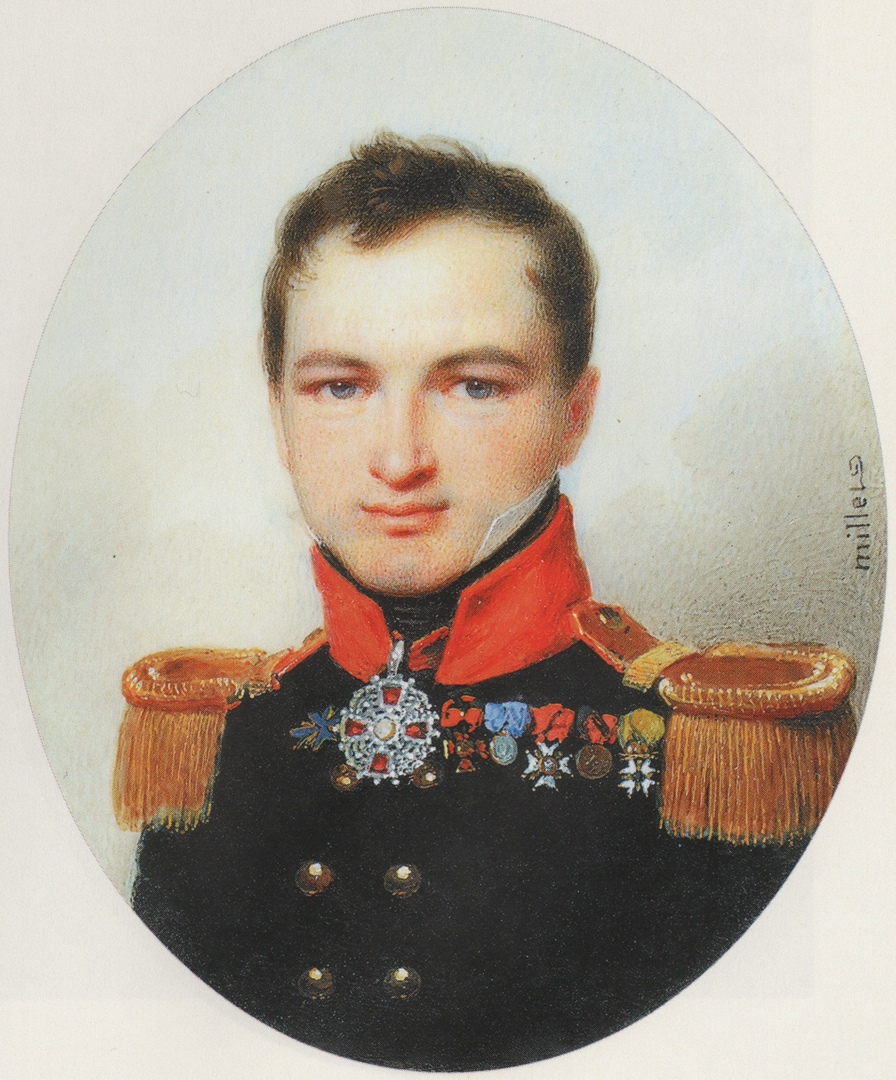
- Portrait by Frederic Millet (1819)

Taurida Governor
- In office 1823–1829
- Preceded by: Nikolay Perovsky
- Succeeded by: Alexander Kaznacheev

Personal details
- Born: 1792 Moscow, Russian Empire
- Died: December 20, 1831 (aged 38–39) Simferopol, Russian Empire
- Spouse: Natalia Rostopchina
- Relations: Naryshkins
- Children: Anatoly Naryshkin
- Parents: Vasily Naryshkin (father); Anna Vorontsova (mother)
- Awards: Order of Saint Vladimir; Order of Saint Anna; Order of Saint Louis; Pour le Mérite; Order of the Sword

Military service
- Allegiance: Russian Empire
- Branch/service: Infantry
- Years of service: 1810–1823
- Rank: Colonel
- Battles/wars: Patriotic War of 1812

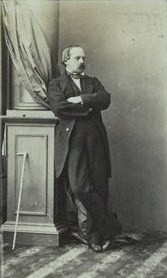
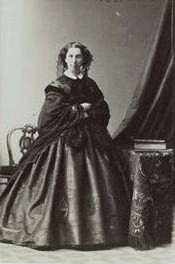
Фёдор и Татьяна Нарышкины (1858)

Dmitry Vasilyevich Naryshkin (Russian: Дмитрий Васильевич Нарышкин; September 1792 – December 20, 1831) was a military officer and official from the Naryshkin Family, a Real State Councillor, civil governor of the Taurida Governorate.

== Biography ==
Naryshkin was the youngest son of Major General Vasily Naryshkin (1740–1800) from his marriage to Anna Vorontsova (1750–1807), the eldest daughter of Count Ivan Vorontsov, granddaughter of the cabinet minister Volynsky. He was born in Moscow and raised at home.

From 1810, he served as a lieutenant in the Semyonovsky Life Guards Regiment. Since 1812, he was adjutant under Lieutenant General Nikolay Raevsky. Participated in the Patriotic War of 1812, including the Battle of Borodino. For distinction in battles, he was awarded the Orders of Saint Anna, 3rd Class, and Saint Vladimir, 4th Class With a Bow. In 1813, he was promoted to second lieutenant, from 1814, to lieutenant, from 1815, to captain. Later he served in the Novoingermanland Regiment.

In 1823, for health reasons, he was dismissed from military service with the rank of colonel. Naryshkin suffered from the consequences of numerous injuries and needed a mild climate. His second cousin, the Governor General of Novorossia, Count Mikhail Vorontsov, under whom Naryshkin was an adjutant, procured him a place as Governor of Tavria.

He held this position from October 16, 1823, to April 17, 1829. Having fallen into insanity, Naryshkin was replaced by Alexander Kaznacheev. According to Philipp Vigel, he was "an extremely kind fellow, good–natured, easy to handle, and had in himself more of a military man than of a palace".

He owned estates in the Crimea, in the Vladimir, Tver, Yaroslavl and Tambov Provinces. He died on December 20, 1831, in Simferopol from epilepsy, and was buried there in the Old Cemetery.

== Family ==
His wife (married July 1819) was Natalya Rostopchina (1797–1866), the eldest daughter of the infantry general Count Fyodor Rostopchin. Their wedding was in Paris at the same time as the wedding of her sister Sophia with the Comte de Segur. After marriage, Natalya Fedorovna lived mainly in the Crimea, in Simeiz. Later, for the education of children, she moved to Saint Petersburg. According to contemporaries, she was a smart, kind and enlightened woman; in–depth in the study of the languages and literature of France and England, outwardly she was pretty, although not so much that one could call her a beauty. Thanks to her patronage, the artist Aivazovsky was enrolled in the Academy of Arts. She left notes about the stay of the Rostopchin family in 1812 in Yaroslavl, which were published by her granddaughter in 1912. She was buried next to her father at the Pyatnitskoye Cemetery in Moscow. In marriage, she had sons:

- Fyodor Dmitrievich (April 21, 1820 – 1870), was married (since September 3, 1848) to the maid of honor Princess Tatyana Dolgorukova (1824–1893), daughter of Chief Marshal Nikolai Dolgorukov. She suffered from a nervous breakdown and was being treated by Doctor Roller at Illenau near Baden. Their only daughter, Natalia (1852–1923), was married to Fyodor Opochinin. He died of a heart attack in Dresden;
- Anatoly Dmitrievich (1829–1883), chamberlain, married to Princess Elizaveta Kurakina (1838–1928), lady of state and chief chamberlain of Empress Alexandra Feodorovna, cavalry lady; they had a son Cyril;
- Mikhail Dmitrievich, died at the age of 18 months, was buried at the Pyatnitsky Cemetery in Moscow.
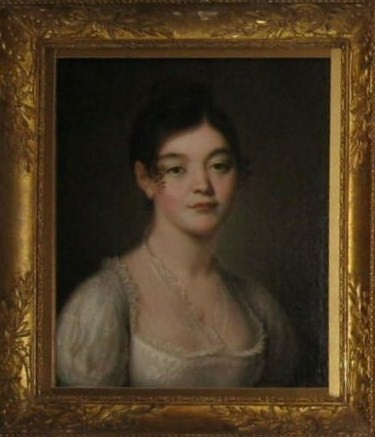
Natalya Fedorovna

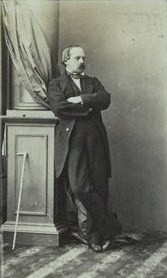
Fedor Naryshkin

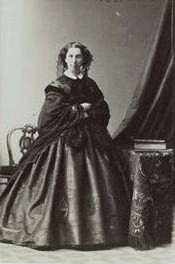
Tatyana Naryshkina

== Awards ==
- Order of Saint Anna, 3rd Class (Badge on the Sword);
- Order of Saint Vladimir, 4th Class With a Bow;
- Order of Saint Anna, 2nd Class With Diamonds;
- Order of Saint Anna, 1st Class (May 3, 1826);
- Silver Medal "In Memory of the Patriotic War of 1812";
- Order of Saint Louis, Cavalier's Cross (Kingdom of France);
- Order "Pour le Mérite" (13–18 October 1814) (Kingdom of Prussia);
- Order of the Sword, Knight's Cross (Kingdom of Sweden).

== Sources ==
- Rummel, Witold; Golubtsov, Vladimir (1887). Genealogical Collection of Russian Noble Families. Vol. 2 (Alexei Suvorin ed.). Saint Petersburg. p. 345.
