= Uzeir Abduramanov =

Sapper in World War II and Hero of the Soviet Union

- Üzeir Abduraman oğlu Abduramanov
- Born: 25 March [O.S. 12 March] 1916; Simferopolsky Uyezd, Taurida Governorate (Crimea), Russian Empire
- Died: 19 January 1991 (aged 75) (Note: Several sources incorrectly state he died in 1992, not 1991.); Navoiy, Uzbekistan
- Military career
- Allegiance: Soviet Union
- Branch: Red Army Engineer Troops
- Service years: 1939–1944
- Rank: Senior Sergeant
- Unit: 321st Separate Engineering Battalion
- Conflicts: Battle of Khalkhin Gol; World War II
- Awards: Hero of the Soviet Union

Uzeir Abduramanovich Abduramanov (Crimean Tatar: Üzeir Abduraman oğlu Abduramanov, Russian: Узеир Абдураманович Абдураманов; 25 March 1916 – 19 January 1991) was a sapper in the Red Army during World War Two. After securing the safe transfer of troops across the Sozh river under heavy enemy fire and through icy water he was awarded the title Hero of the Soviet Union for his bravery but was exiled soon after for being a Crimean-Tatar.

== Early life ==
Abduramanov was born on 25 March 1916 to a peasant Crimean-Tatar family in either Kashik-Degirmen or Jag'a Mamish, Crimea. After completing trade school in 1933 he worked in Simferopol until he was drafted into the Red Army in 1939. He was very supportive of communism and an active member of the Komsomol. Before World War II he participated in the Battle of Khalkhin Gol.

== World War II ==
Abduramanov was deployed to fight in World War II shortly after the start of Operation Barbarossa. He fought on the Southwestern Front until April 1942, the North Caucasian Front until February 1943, and then on the Central Front. He saw action in the Battle of Stalingrad before advancing on to Byelorussia.

During the fighting in Novye Tereshkovichi, Gomel Region in 1943 he was one of the seventeen sappers tasked with building a bridge across the icy Sozh river for advancing Red Army troops. The crossing lasted nine hours, and only three of the sappers survived. The sappers had stayed in the ice water the entire time and continued to lay support beams even under heavy enemy artillery and machine-gun fire. Leading his crew, he refused to leave the freezing water despite sustaining a head injury and blood loss. After the construction was finished he was thanked by general Pavel Batov. For his resilience and bravery at the Sozh crossing he was declared a Hero of the Soviet Union by decree of the Supreme Soviet on 15 January 1944. He had been previously recognized for his bravery in the Sev and Desna crossings.

At the award ceremony in the Kremlin, Mikhail Kalinin remarked on how short he was while giving him his gold star. In February 1944 he became cadet at the Moscow Engineering School, but was expelled from the school before graduating due to the deportation of Crimean Tatars.

== 1944 ==
In May 1944 his family was deported to Uzbekistan because of their Crimean Tatar ethnicity; his status as a war hero did not stop the Soviet government of declaring his family "enemies of the people". In the summer Abduramanov visited Crimea, expecting that his status as a war hero would have saved his family from deportation, only to find that they too had been exiled. As he was a Crimean Tatar, he was expelled from the military academy and sent to Uzbekistan, where he found his family was living on the Narpay state farm.

== Life in exile ==
He never lived to his native Crimea again despite being individually given permission to return in 1948, since he would not be allowed to bring his extended family with him, and his grandfather pointed out that there were no other Muslims left in Crimea. In 1951 he moved to Gijduvan in Bukhara region, where he worked at a cotton processing facility, and in 1962 he moved to Navoi, where he worked at a uranium plant. After the death of Stalin, the Crimean Tatars were not permitted to return to their homeland, despite other exiled groups being given the right to return in the Khrushchev era. As such, he was an active member of the Crimean Tatar rights movement he attended delegations to Moscow, and was frequently harassed by the KGB for it. After several years of poor health he died in the city of Navoiy in 1991, since he was too sick to travel to Crimea by the time that Crimean Tatars were all permitted to return to Crimea in 1989.

== Identity ==
Uzeir Abduramanov was a full-blooded Crimean Tatar. However, that did not stop Soviet media from outright claiming or implying that he was not a Crimean Tatar. Issue No. 45-46 Ogonyok magazine in 1944 included his portrait in a photo gallery of Heroes of the Soviet Union celebrating the ethnic diversity of Soviet soldiers; but the caption for Abduramanov's picture said he was ethnically Azerbaijani, not Crimean Tatar. Abduramanov had no Azerbaijani ancestry or ties to Azerbaijani and never identified or labeled himself as an ethnic Azerbaijani. The encyclopedia of Heroes of the Soviet Union published in 1987 labeled him as simply "Tatar", as the term "Crimean Tatar" was not in official use since Crimean Tatars were not a recognized ethnic group. In 1976 an article in Sovet Uzbekistoni newspaper quoted him talking about the river crossing that he was awarded the title Hero of the Soviet Union for and emphasized the heroism of ethnic Uzbeks in the war, but made no mention of the fact that he was not an Uzbek but a Crimean Tatar. However, the newspaper Lenin Bayrağı, marketed exclusively to Crimean Tatars, did acknowledge that he was a Crimean Tatar.

== Awards and honors ==
- Hero of the Soviet Union (1944)
- Order of Lenin (1944)
- Order of the Patriotic War 1st class (1985)
- Medal "For Battle Merit" (1943)
- campaign and jubilee medals
