= Tavria =

Tavria is primarily a geographic toponym for a subregion of Southern Ukraine that encompasses steppe territories between the Dnipro river and Molochna rivers and the Crimean peninsula.

Tavria also may refer to:

- Tavria Okruha (1918-1920), northern part of the Taurida Governorate, which today includes most of the Kherson and southern portion of Zaporizhzhia oblasts (regions)
- An alternative name for the whole Taurida Governorate (1802-1918)
- ZAZ Tavria, Ukrainian car model
- Tavria State Agrotechnological Academy in Melitopol, see uk:Таврійський державний агротехнологічний університет імені Дмитра Моторного
- Tauria, the Poseidon festival at Ephesus, where those serving were termed ταῦρoι.
