= Tavria Okruha =

Tavria Okruha Таврійська округа
- Okruha of Ukraine
- 1918–1920
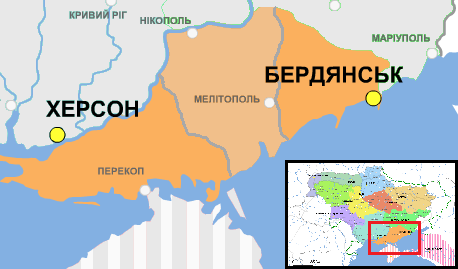
- Capital: Berdiansk
- History
  - Split of Taurida Governorate: 1918
  - Split into Mykolaiv Governorate and Zaporizhzhia Governorate: 1920
Preceded by	Succeeded by
Taurida Governorate	Mykolaiv Governorate; Zaporizhzhia Governorate

Tavria Okruha (Ukrainian: Таврійська округа, romanized: Tavriiska okruha) was an administrative subdivision of the Ukrainian State (Ukraine) created in April 1918. The okruha was governed by a starosta from Berdiansk. The territory consisted of the continental part of the earlier Tavria guberniia, without the territory of the Crimean Peninsula.

Following withdrawal of the forces of the Central powers in late 1918, Russian tri-colors of the Armed Forces of South Russia were raised in most of the okruha, except for a few localities in Dnipro County closer to Kherson Governorate.

After the Bolsheviks took control, the okruha was split between the Kherson Governorate and Oleksandrivsk (Zaporizhzhia) Governorate.

== Subdivisions ==
- Dnipro County (Dniprovskyi povit)
- Melitopol County (Melitopolskyi povit)
- Berdiansk County (Berdianskyi povit)

== Governors ==
- summer–fall 1918: Oleksandr Desnytskyi (gubernatorial starosta)
- 1918–1919: Ihor Lutskenko (as Kherson gubernatorial commissar)

== See also ==
- Administrative divisions of Ukraine (1918-1925)
