= Lew Grade =

British media proprietor (1906–1998)

The Right Honourable The Lord Grade OStJ
- 1997 artistic portrait by The Earl of Snowdon.
- Born: Lev Isaakovich Winogradsky; 25 December 1906; Tokmak, Taurida Governorate, Russian Empire (present-day Tokmak, Zaporizhzhia Oblast, Ukraine)
- Died: 13 December 1998 (aged 91); London, England
- Resting place: Liberal Jewish Cemetery, Willesden, London
- Other names: Louis Grad (as professional dancer); "The Dancer with the Humorous Feet"
- Citizenship: United Kingdom (after 1912)
- Education: Rochelle Street Elementary School
- Occupations: Media proprietor; impresario; talent agent; dancer
- Years active: 1926–1998
- Spouse: Kathleen Moody (m. 1942)
- Children: 1
- Relatives: Bernard Delfont (brother); Leslie Grade (brother); Michael Grade (nephew)

Lew Grade, Baron Grade, OStJ (born Lev Isaakovich Winogradsky, Russian: Лев Исаакович Виноградский, romanized: Lev Isaakovich Vinogradsky; 25 December 1906 [O.S. 7 January 1907] – 13 December 1998) was a British media proprietor and impresario. Born to Jewish parents in the Russian Empire, he emigrated to the United Kingdom as a child and was raised in London. Originally a dancer, and later a talent agent, Grade's interest in television production began in 1954 when he founded the Incorporated Television Company (ITC; commonly known as ITC Entertainment) to distribute programmes.

Following the success of The Adventures of Robin Hood, Grade decided to focus on bringing ITC programmes to the American market. Grade had some success in this field with such series as Gerry Anderson's many Supermarionation series such as Thunderbirds, Patrick McGoohan's The Prisoner, and Jim Henson's The Muppet Show. Later, Grade invested in feature film production, but several expensive box-office failures caused him to lose control of ITC, and ultimately resulted in the disestablishment of its associate ATV, which lost its ITV franchise.

== Early life ==
Grade was born Lev Winogradsky in Tokmak, Berdyansky Uyezd, Taurida Governorate, Russian Empire (now Ukraine), to Isaak and Olga Winogradsky. In 1912, when Grade was five years old, his Jewish family escaped the pogroms by emigrating from Odessa, via Berlin to London and resettled on Brick Lane near Shoreditch in the East End of London.

Isaak worked as a trouser-presser while his three sons (Grade and his younger brothers, Bernard (later Bernard Delfont) and Leslie) attended the Rochelle Street Elementary School near Shoreditch, where Yiddish was spoken by 90% of the pupils. For two years the Winogradskys lived in rented rooms at the north end of Brick Lane, before moving to the nearby Boundary Estate.

=== Early professional life ===
At the age of 15, Grade became an agent for a clothing company, and shortly afterwards started his own business. In 1926, he was declared Charleston Champion of the World at a dancing competition at the Royal Albert Hall. Fred Astaire was one of the judges.

Grade subsequently became a professional dancer going by the stage name Louis Grad, "The Dancer with the Humorous Feet". He later changed this name to Lew Grade, which came from a Paris reporter's typing error that Grade liked and decided to keep. He was signed as a dancer by Joe Collins (father of Jackie and Joan Collins) in 1931. Decades later, the octogenarian Lord Grade once danced the Charleston at a party Arthur Ochs Sulzberger gave in New York.

== Talent agent ==
Around 1934, Grade went into partnership with Joe Collins and became a talent agent in their company Collins & Grade. Among their earliest clients were the harmonica player Larry Adler and the jazz group Quintette du Hot Club de France.

Following the beginning of the Second World War in 1939, Grade became involved in arranging entertainment for soldiers in Harrogate, and later joined the British Army. He was discharged after two years when an old problem with swelling of the knees, which had earlier ended his dancing career, recurred. In 1945, the arrangement with Collins having been terminated, Grade formed a partnership with his brother Leslie (Lew and Leslie Grade Ltd., or the Grade Organisation). That year, the brothers travelled in the United States, where they developed their entertainment interests. His connections included, among others, Bob Hope and Judy Garland, who performed in Britain for the first time. The brothers became the main bookers of artists for the London Palladium in 1948, then managed by Val Parnell for the Moss Empires Group owned by the family of Prince Littler. The agency became the most successful in the UK and in 1967 it was acquired by EMI for $21 million with Grade and his two brothers joining the EMI board.

== Media career ==
=== Television: 1954–1962 ===
In 1954, Grade was contacted by the manager of singer Jo Stafford, Mike Nidorf, who notified him of an advertisement in The Times inviting franchise bids for the new, commercial ITV network.

Assembling a consortium that included impresarios Val Parnell and Prince Littler, the Incorporated Television Programme Company (ITP), which soon changed its name to Incorporated Television Company (ITC; also known as ITC Entertainment), was formed. ITC's bid to the Independent Television Authority (ITA) was rejected on the grounds of its conflict of interest from its prominence and involvement in artist management.

The Associated Broadcasting Development Company (ABD) had gained ITA approval for both the London weekend and Midlands weekday contracts, but was undercapitalised; Grade's consortium joined with the ABD to form what became Associated Television (ATV). Reflecting his background in variety, Grade's favourite show and a success for the new company was Sunday Night at the London Palladium (1955–1967, 1973–1974), one of the most popular programmes on British television in its day. Grade did not avoid the other end of the cultural spectrum and in 1958 Sir Kenneth Clark began to talk about the history of art on television.

Meanwhile, Grade committed the funds for what would become the first trans-Atlantic success of the ITP subsidiary: The Adventures of Robin Hood (1955–1960), commissioned by UK-based American producer Hannah Weinstein. ITC became a wholly owned ATV subsidiary in 1957. That same year ATV established a music publishing division with ATV Music and gained a half interest in Pye Records in 1959; later Pye became a wholly owned subsidiary.

=== Television: 1962–1968 ===
Grade was deputy managing director of ATV under Val Parnell until 1962, when he became managing director having contrived to have the board oust Parnell. Grade soon decided that the Midlands deserved its own regular soap opera as a rival to Coronation Street. Crossroads, much derided but ultimately a serious challenge to Granada's series in the ratings, began its initial quarter century run in November 1964.

ITC's success continued and had many internationally successful TV series, leading Howard Thomas, managing director of ABC Weekend TV, to complain that Grade distributed programming for "Birmingham, Alabama, rather than Birmingham, England". These series included The Saint (1962–1969), which was sold to over 80 countries, and two featuring Patrick McGoohan: Danger Man (1960–1968) and The Prisoner (1967–1968). The series, exclusively thrillers, were normally used as summer replacements for American-made programmes until the mid-1960s. While many of Grade's series used American actors in lead roles (The Baron and Man in a Suitcase, for example) it was those series which used an exclusively British cast, such as The Saint (and The Avengers, made by another ITV contractor), which were more successful in the United States.

In 1962, AP Films became a subsidiary of ITC. Co-founded by Gerry Anderson, AP Films produced two marionette puppet ("Supermarionation") series for children during the 1960s: Thunderbirds (1965–1966) and (as Century 21) Captain Scarlet and the Mysterons (1967–1968). After a screening of the pilot for Thunderbirds ("Trapped in the Sky", 1964), Grade insisted that the episodes be lengthened to fill a one-hour slot. Unusually for children's television series, these colour programmes were generously budgeted for the time (Grade paid £22,000 per episode) and were successfully repeated internationally.

In 1966, Grade's companies were re-organised again to form the Associated Communications Corporation (ACC). That year, The Sunday Times investigated the interconnected nature of the companies controlled by Grade and his two brothers, Bernard Delfont and Leslie Grade. Their firms, effectively amounting to a "cartel", were agents for most of the major talents in acting as well as entertainment and controlled theatres in both London and the rest of the UK and ATV was a major provider of televised entertainment.

=== Later television productions ===
The following year, ATV lost its London franchise to what would become London Weekend Television (LWT); at the same time, however, ATV's Midlands franchise was expanded to run throughout the week from July 1968. Through ATV Music, Grade acquired Northern Songs, gaining control of the Lennon–McCartney song catalogue.

Foreign sales remained strong for a time (valued at $30 million in 1970) and the ACC received the Queen's Awards for Export in both 1967 and 1969.

Some of the 1970s distributions performed poorly: these included The Julie Andrews Hour (1972–73), which aired for only one season on the ABC Television Network in the United States. This received positive reviews and seven Emmy Awards, including the title of 'Best Variety Series'. The action series The Protectors (1972–74) and The Persuaders! (1971–72), were not especially successful. Gerry Anderson moved to live action science fiction shows UFO (1969–71) and Space: 1999 (1975–77). After Space: 1999, Anderson made no new series for ITC, but maintained a connection with Grade until Grade lost control of his companies in 1982.

In the mid-1970s, Grade approached American puppeteer Jim Henson, who was in need of assistance for his latest television project. Henson wanted to create a new variety show starring his Muppet characters, but had been dismissed by American networks on account of his contributions to children's programmes such as Sesame Street (1969–present). CBS came close to agreeing to broadcast The Muppet Show, but only if it was during a syndicated block of its programming. After watching one of Henson's pilots and recalling a special made in one of his studios, Grade allowed Henson to realise his project in Britain (the series was recorded at the ATV Elstree Studios, later bought by the BBC, primarily used for EastEnders) and distributed internationally by ITC. Grade's action was instrumental in bringing The Muppet Show to the screen in 1976 and ensuring its success; it ran until 1981.

Grade's other accomplishments in television included the mini-series Jesus of Nazareth (1977), which was successfully sold to the American market and secured a record-breaking $12 million in revenue. Several years in preparation, the deal with the Italian broadcaster RAI and director Franco Zeffirelli had been announced three years previously.

=== Film ===
Grade approached Blake Edwards to revive the Pink Panther franchise as a TV series, an option Edwards was not keen on, but he did work on developing scripts. Eventually, he persuaded Grade to finance the property as a feature film project with he and Peter Sellers waiving their fees in return for a profit-sharing arrangement. Both men's careers had not been prospering for a few years. Only Grade's second big budget feature, ITC produced the eventual film The Return of the Pink Panther (1975), while United Artists (UA), who had earlier rejected the project themselves, gained distribution rights and a 5% share of the profits. Distribution in other countries was undertaken by ITC. The Return of the Pink Panther was a commercially successful release.

It also prompted Grade to move into the film industry, where he had success with Farewell My Lovely (1975). Other films of the period made with Grade's involvement include the co-releases The Boys from Brazil (1978) with 20th Century Fox and Movie Movie (also 1978) with Warner Bros. He was a producer on the Ingmar Bergman films Autumn Sonata (1978) and From the Life of the Marionettes (1980). Grade was executive producer of The Muppet Movie (1979) and The Great Muppet Caper (1981); Orson Welles portrayed a studio executive named "Lew Lord" in the first film. One domestic British film made by the ITC subsidiary Black Lion Films, The Long Good Friday (1980) was purchased and released by HandMade Films after Grade and his company had effectively disowned it for, in Grade's reputed opinion, seeming to be sympathetic to the IRA.

Grade's backing of an expensive "all-star" flop was to prove decisive. Of Raise the Titanic (1980), an adaptation of the novel by Clive Cussler, Grade himself observed that "It would have been cheaper to lower the Atlantic". The film was panned by critics and, after costing $36 million, returned only $8 million in rentals. This film along with other expensive box office failures – including Saturn 3 (1980) and The Legend of the Lone Ranger (1981) – marked the end of Grade's involvement in major film production. Despite this, several of the most critically acclaimed films produced by Grade were released after the failure of Raise the Titanic: these included On Golden Pond (1981) and Sophie's Choice (1982), both winners of Academy Awards, as well as the western Barbarosa and The Dark Crystal (1982), which was Jim Henson's final project created in association with ITC.

=== Later years ===
In 1980, Grade's standing in the mass media industry was damaged by two events: the poor reception for Raise the Titanic, and a decision that, effective from 1 January 1982 ATV Midlands would be permitted to keep its licence only on the condition that it terminate its association with Grade and ITC (ultimately leading to its re-branding as Central Television). Grade resigned his position in the company while it underwent a series of partnerships and mergers. In 1982, he lost control of ACC to Robert Holmes à Court, who dismissed him and all his staff.

Grade was brought in by American producer Norman Lear in June 1982 to head the London division of Embassy Communications International, to be involved in the production and distribution of films and television programmes. Subsequently, he became a producer of Andrew Lloyd Webber's musical Starlight Express. After Coca-Cola had bought Embassy, he became the head of a new venture, the Grade Company, in 1985, and was elected a vice-president of the Loews Group chain of cinemas in the United States. The Grade Company produced adaptations for television of works by novelist Dame Barbara Cartland; he owned the rights to 450 of her romances.

By the early to mid-1990s, Grade had returned to ITC to head the company one final time until his death in 1998. Grade was a member of the Founding Council of the Rothermere American Institute at the University of Oxford.

== Honours ==
In 1969, Grade was knighted. He was created a life peer (as Baron Grade of Elstree in the County of Hertfordshire) on 22 June 1976. He reportedly chose Elstree as his territorial designation because ATV's main studios were based there.

Coat of arms of Lew Grade

Coronet
That of a Baron
Crest
A sinister cubit arm erect vested Vert cuffed Argent charged with a mask of comedy Or the hand Proper holding a balalaika Or sound box to the dexter.
Escutcheon
Per chevron grady Vert and Or in chief two pierced mullets Or and in base a bear's jamb erased Sable armed Gules.
Supporters
Dexter upon a lightning flash Or a lion Proper gorged with a cord pendent therefrom a representation of itself all Or, sinister upon a lightning flash Or a horse Sable gorged with a cord pendent therefrom a representation of itself all Or.
Motto
Quod Promitto Perficio (What I Promise I Carry Out)

== Death ==
In 1978, Grade, then aged 71, told interviewer Mike Wallace on the CBS program 60 Minutes, "I don't intend to retire until the year 2000." Grade died of heart failure aged 91 on 13 December 1998 in London. He was buried at the Liberal Jewish Cemetery in London's Willesden neighbourhood.

BBC Radio 2 transmitted two one-hour tribute programmes on 24 and 25 December 2006 as a celebration of Grade's life and marking the centenary of his birth.
