= Belbek =

Belbek may refer to:

- Belbek Airport, a.k.a. Belbek Air Base, Crimea
- Belbek River, Crimea
- Former name of Fruktove, village in Crimea
