= Zaporizhzhia Governorate =

Coordinates: 47.840°N 35.199°E

Zaporizhzhia Governorate Запорізька губернія
- Governorate of Ukrainian SSR
- 1920–1922
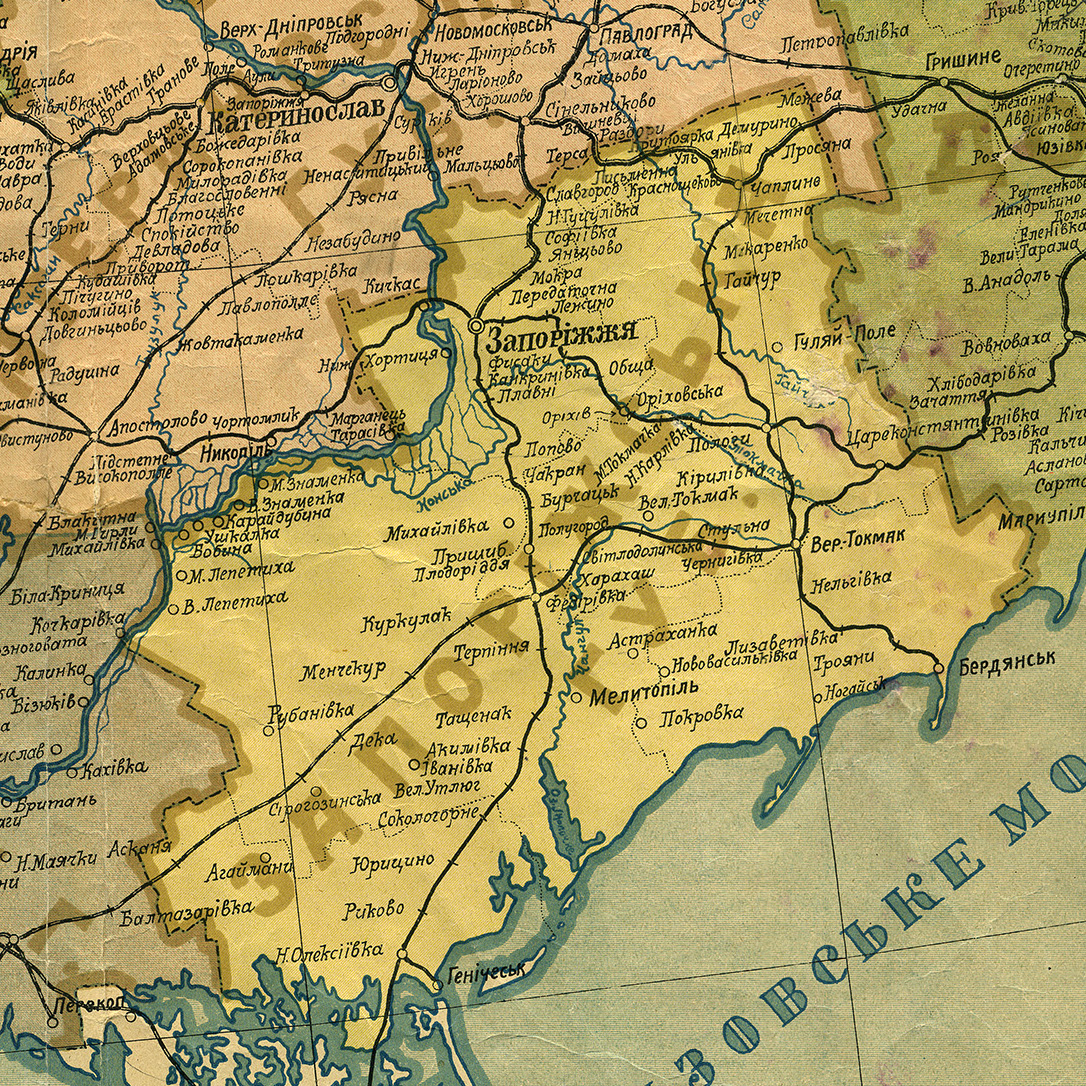
- Map of 1922
- Capital: Zaporizhzhia (Aleksandrovsk)
- History
  - Tavria Okruha liquidation: 16 April 1920
  - merged into Yekaterinoslav Governorate: 21 October 1922
Preceded by	Succeeded by
Yekaterinoslav Governorate; Tavria Okruha	Yekaterinoslav Governorate

Zaporizhzhia Governorate (Ukrainian: Запорізька губернія, romanized: Zaporizka huberniia) was a territorial division or gubernia of the Ukrainian SSR (Ukraine) that was created in April 1920. The new governorate was temporarily established in place of the Tavria Okruha.

Soon after the Ukrainian SSR joined the Soviet Union, the governorate was merged into the Yekaterinoslav Governorate.

== Subdivisions ==
- Berdiansk County
- Henichesk County
- Huliaipole County
- Velykyi Tokmak County
- Oleksandrivsk County
