= Taisiya Maksimovna Stadnichenko =

Russian born geologist and chemist

- Born: Стадниченко, Таисия Максимовна; 9.10.1894; Russian Empire
- Died: 26.11.1958 (64 years); USA
- Education: Saint Petersburg University
- Scientific career
- Fields: Geology, geochemistry

Taisia Stadnichenko (Taisiya Maximovna Stadnichenko; 9 October 1894 – 26 November 1958) was a Russian-born geologist and chemist, whose fieldwork focused on the distribution of germanium and the minor-element content in coal. She worked for the Russian and US Geological Surveys, researched at the University of Illinois, and taught at Vassar College.

== Biography ==
Stadnichenko was born in Taganash, Perekopsky Uyezd, Crimea, on 9 October 1894. She had two sisters.

She was educated at the Vladivostok Gymnasium until 1912, and then attended Petrograd University, graduating in 1917. She joined the Russian Geological Survey and made an expedition to the island of Sakhalin, before moving to the United States in 1918 to act as an interpreter for the Russian mission throughout World War I.

After the war, she continued her professional life as a research fellow at the University of Illinois from 1918 to 1919, and worked for the Far East Geological Survey for three years until 1922. She was then a professor at Vassar College from 1922 to 1935. She was an associate geologist and then a geologist with the US Geological Survey from 1931 until 1958.

In 1935, Stadnichenko led the first U.S Geological Survey exploring the minor-element distribution within coal by collecting samples of coal ash for element content analysis, which found germanium and other elements within the coal ash. Stadnichenko is widely considered instrumental in the discovery and understanding of coal's structure and origin.

Stadnichenko died on 26 November 26 1958, at the age of sixty-four due to a heart ailment. She never married.
