= Berdiansk (disambiguation) =

Berdiansk is a port city in the eponymous municipality on the Sea of Azov in the eponymous raion of Zaporizhzhia Oblast, Ukraine.

Berdiansk (Ukrainian: Бердя́нськ) or Berdyansk (Russian: Бердя́нск) may also refer to:

== Places ==
- Berdiansk Municipality, in Berdiansk Raion, Zaporizhzhia Oblast, Ukraine
- Berdiansk Raion, Zaporizhzhia Oblast, Ukraine
- Berdyansky Uyezd, Taurida Governorate, Empire of Russia
- Berdiansk Airport, an airport in Berdiansk
- Berdyansk Spit, a spit on the Sea of Azov
- Berdyansk Bay, a gulf of the Sea of Azov between Berdyansk Spit and Obytochna Spit

== Other uses ==
- Battle of Berdiansk (2022) during the Russian invasion of Ukraine
