= Violet Elliott =

Australian comedian (1899–1977)

- Born: Violet Zara Hargrave; 26 February 1899; Melbourne, Victoria
- Died: 20 May 1977 (aged 78); Randwick, New South Wales, Australia
- Other names: Chick (or Chic) Elliott
- Occupation(s): Comedian, singer, actress

Violet Elliott (born Violet Zara Hargrave; 26 February 1899 – 20 May 1977), who was known in Britain as Chick Elliott, was an Australian comedian, singer and actress.

== Early life and career ==
She was born in Melbourne, the daughter of Arthur Hargrave — a New Zealand-born comedian and acrobat who used the stage name Arthur Elliott — and his wife Maud Fanning. The family toured widely in Australia and New Zealand as part of variety revues, and Violet (credited as Violet Elliott) joined the shows from a young age, performing with her parents and sisters. From about 1913, she largely performed a solo act, combining comic routines and singing, and from the late 1910s onward toured Australia as a solo performer, often performing in blackface make-up as a 'coon' singer, and appearing in pantomimes. In the 1920s, she featured in several Australian films, and on radio.

== Work in Britain ==
In 1930 she moved to Britain, where she was known as Chick (or Chic) Elliott in order to avoid confusion with another actress of a similar name. She continued to perform as a blackface act in touring variety shows, and as a stand-up comedian in an evening gown. She worked in musical comedies, revues and operettas, and appeared in the 1942 British film, Asking for Trouble. She appeared in Merrie England at the Princes Theatre, followed by a show, The Kid from Stratford, with Arthur Askey, until 1948.

== Personal life and death ==
In the 1950s, she returned to live in Australia. She was married twice. She died in Randwick, New South Wales in 1977 at the age of 78.
