= Feodosiysky Uyezd =

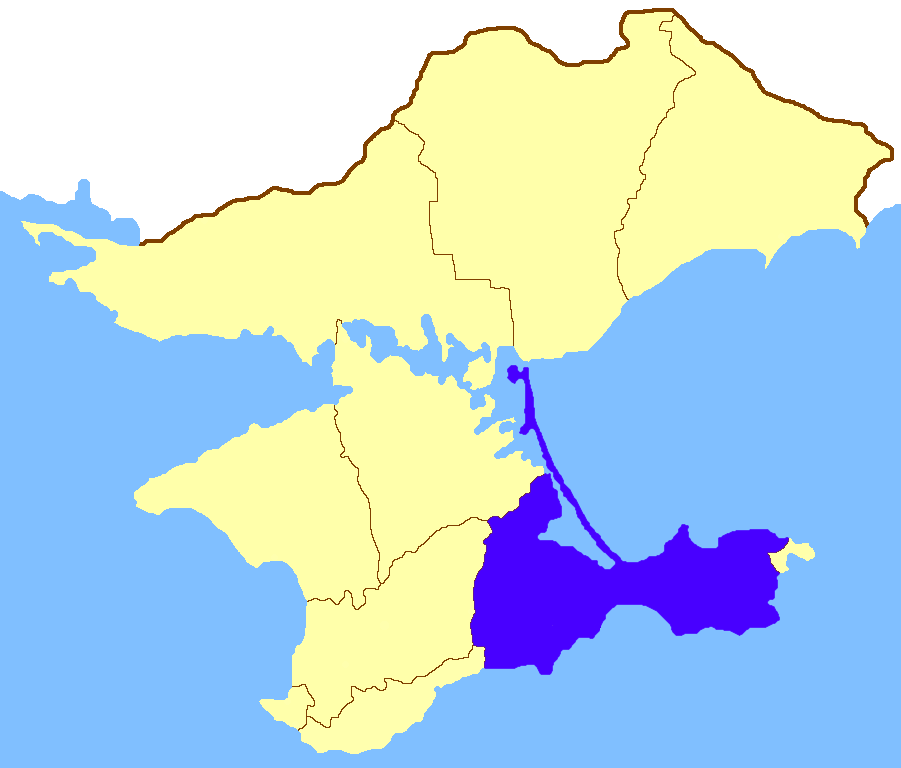
Feodosiysky Uyezd on the map of the Tauride Governate

Feodosiysky Uyezd (Феодосийский уезд) was one of the subdivisions of the Taurida Governorate of the Russian Empire. It was situated in the southeastern part of the governorate, in eastern Crimea. Its administrative centre was Feodosiya.

== Demographics ==
At the time of the Russian Empire Census of 1897, Feodosiysky Uyezd had a population of 24,096. Of these, 46.8% spoke Russian, 18.8% Crimean Tatar, 11.4% Yiddish, 7.7% Ukrainian, 5.3% Greek, 3.7% Armenian, 2.5% Polish, 1.3% German, 0.6% Belarusian, 0.5% Turkish, 0.3% Latvian, 0.2% Italian, 0.2% Bulgarian, 0.2% French, 0.1% Moldovan or Romanian and 0.1% Czech as their native language.
