= Yevpatoriysky Uyezd =

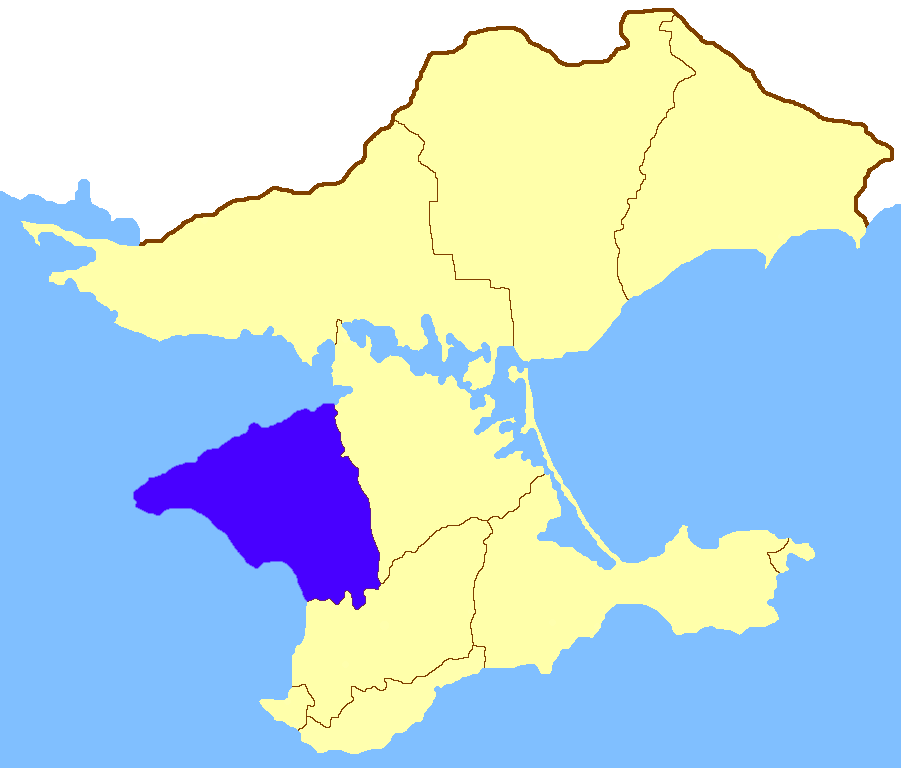
Location of Yevpatoriysky Uyezd in the Taurida Governorate.

Yevpatoriysky Uyezd (Евпаторийский уезд) was one of the subdivisions of the Taurida Governorate of the Russian Empire. It was situated in the southwestern part of the governorate, in western Crimea. Its administrative centre was Yevpatoria.

== Demographics ==
At the time of the Russian Empire Census of 1897, Yevpatoriysky Uyezd had a population of 63,211. Of these, 42.7% spoke Crimean Tatar, 21.1% Ukrainian, 17.6% Russian, 12.0% German, 2.5% Yiddish, 1.6% Greek, 0.7% Armenian, 0.6% Estonian, 0.3% Polish, 0.3% Belarusian, 0.2% Czech, 0.1% Romani, 0.1% Mordvin and 0.1% Moldovan or Romanian as their native language.
