= Asking for Trouble =

1942 film by Oswald Mitchell

- Directed by: Oswald Mitchell
- Written by: Con West; Oswald Mitchell
- Produced by: Wallace Orton
- Starring: Max Miller; Carole Lynne; Mark Lester; Wilfrid Hyde-White
- Cinematography: James Wilson
- Edited by: Fergus McDonell
- Music by: Kennedy Russell
- Production company: British National Films Company
- Distributed by: Anglo American Film Corporation
- Release date: September 1942
- Running time: 81 minutes
- Country: United Kingdom
- Language: English

Asking for Trouble is a 1942 British comedy film directed by Oswald Mitchell and starring Max Miller, Carole Lynne and Wilfrid Hyde-White. It was written by Con West and Mitchell.

Its plot follows a fishmonger who takes up bookmaking to earn extra cash.

== Plot ==
When the police catch Cockney fishmonger Dick Smith illegaly taking bets, he runs home – only to find an attractive girl, Jane Smythe, accidentally locked in his bedroom. She is the daughter of General Smythe, trying to escape from an unwelcome arranged marriage to Captain Fortesque, the son of her father's friend. Since the General has not seen Fortesque since he was a boy, Dick assumes his identity. After a series of adventures, Dick and Jane fall in love and the General blesses their marriage.

== Cast ==
- Max Miller as Dick Smith
- Carole Lynne as Jane Smythe
- Mark Lester as General Smythe
- Wilfrid Hyde-White as Pettifer
- Billy Percy as George
- Eleanor Hallam as Margarita
- Aubrey Mallalieu as General Fortesque
- Kenneth Kove as Captain Fortesque
- Chick Elliott as Mandy Lou
- Esma Cannon as Ada
- Lesley Osmond as Paulette
- Raymond Glendenning as commentator
- Lulu as the elephant

== Production ==
The film was made as part of British National's deliberate policy to produce more comedies.

== Reception ==
The Monthly Film Bulletin wrote: "Max Miller is his usual self and talks his way through the film at Niagara Falls speed. The plot is a minor detail. Carol Lynne has little to do but to look beautiful and Mark Lester, as General Smythe, is very good. Lulu the elephant deserves special mention for an outstanding performance."

Kine Weekly wrote: "Rough and ready and occasionally riotous romantic comedy concerning a fishmonger bookie's conquest of a Society girl. Max Miller patters his way tirelessly through the extravagant story, but here and there his exuberant verbosity is happily relieved with familiar, yet popular and colorful, music-hall gags and slapstick. The picture, although primarily a one-man show, wisely extends its typically British entertainment to other than Miller fans. Very good star and quota comedy booking for industrial, family and provincial audiences."
