= David Land =

English impresario and theatre producer (1918–1995)

- Born: 22 May 1918; London, United Kingdom
- Died: 22 December 1995 (aged 77)
- Occupations: Theatre agent & impresario
- Spouse: Alexandra Zara
- Children: 2

David Land (22 May 1918 – 22 December 1995) was an impresario and theatre producer, best known for having developed the early careers of Tim Rice and Andrew Lloyd Webber.

== Early life ==
Land was born 22 May 1918 in London to Polish Jewish immigrants. During World War II, he volunteered with the Royal Army Service Corps.

== Career ==
At the end of the war, he launched a career in show business, producing concerts for stars whose careers had been established during the conflict including the singers Vera Lynn and Anne Shelton and the bandleader Stanley Black.

He then became the European agent for the Harlem Globetrotters and the agent for the Dagenham Girl Pipers. With Joe Collins, he staged one of the first London gigs of The Beatles.

In the late 1960s, he formed a working partnership with the property developer Sefton Myers. Their joint venture signed Tim Rice and Andrew Lloyd Webber for three years, paying them a living wage to develop new projects. Within a year, they completed Jesus Christ Superstar.

After the success of Superstar, Lloyd Webber and Rice's contract with Land and Myers was bought out by impresario Robert Stigwood. As part of the terms of the deal, Land took a senior role in Stigwood's company. In this capacity he co-produced the theatrical versions of Joseph and the Amazing Technicolor Dreamcoat, Superstar and Evita. He continued to act as Rice's agent until Land's death in 1995.

Between 1983 and 1991, Land was chairman of the Young Vic. He bought the Theatre Royal, Brighton in 1984, reviving its fortunes to become the most successful regional theatre in the UK. After his death, the family sold the theatre to Ambassador Theatre Group in 1999.

He founded the David Land Arts Centre and Studio Theatre, which provided rehearsal studio and workshop space for professional and amateur theatre companies.

Land had offices in Wardour Street, London.

== Awards ==
In 1994, Land received an honorary doctorate from the University of Sussex.

== Personal life ==
He married Alexandra Zara in 1945 and had one daughter, Lorraine, and one son, Brook, whose wife, Anita, is daughter of the theatrical talent agent Leslie Grade.

== Death ==
David Land died on 22 December 1995.

A memorial concert was held at the Theatre Royal, Brighton, on 5 March 1996 at which Paul Nicholas, Marti Webb, Colm Wilkinson and Vera Lynn performed.
