= Perekopsky Uyezd =

County of the Tauride province

Perekopsky Uyezd (Перекопский уезд) was one of the subdivisions of the Taurida Governorate of the Russian Empire. It was situated in the central part of the governorate, in northeastern Crimea. Its administrative centre was Perekop.

== Demographics ==
At the time of the Russian Empire Census of 1897, Perekopsky Uyezd had a population of 51,393. Of these, 23.9% spoke Crimean Tatar, 22.8% Russian, 22.8% German, 22.0% Ukrainian, 2.6% Yiddish, 1.6% Estonian, 1.2% Czech, 1.2% Armenian, 0.5% Romani, 0.4% Greek, 0.4% Belarusian, 0.3% Polish, 0.1% Lithuanian and 0.1% Moldovan or Romanian as their native language.
