= Antony Pogorelsky =

Russian writer (1787–1836)

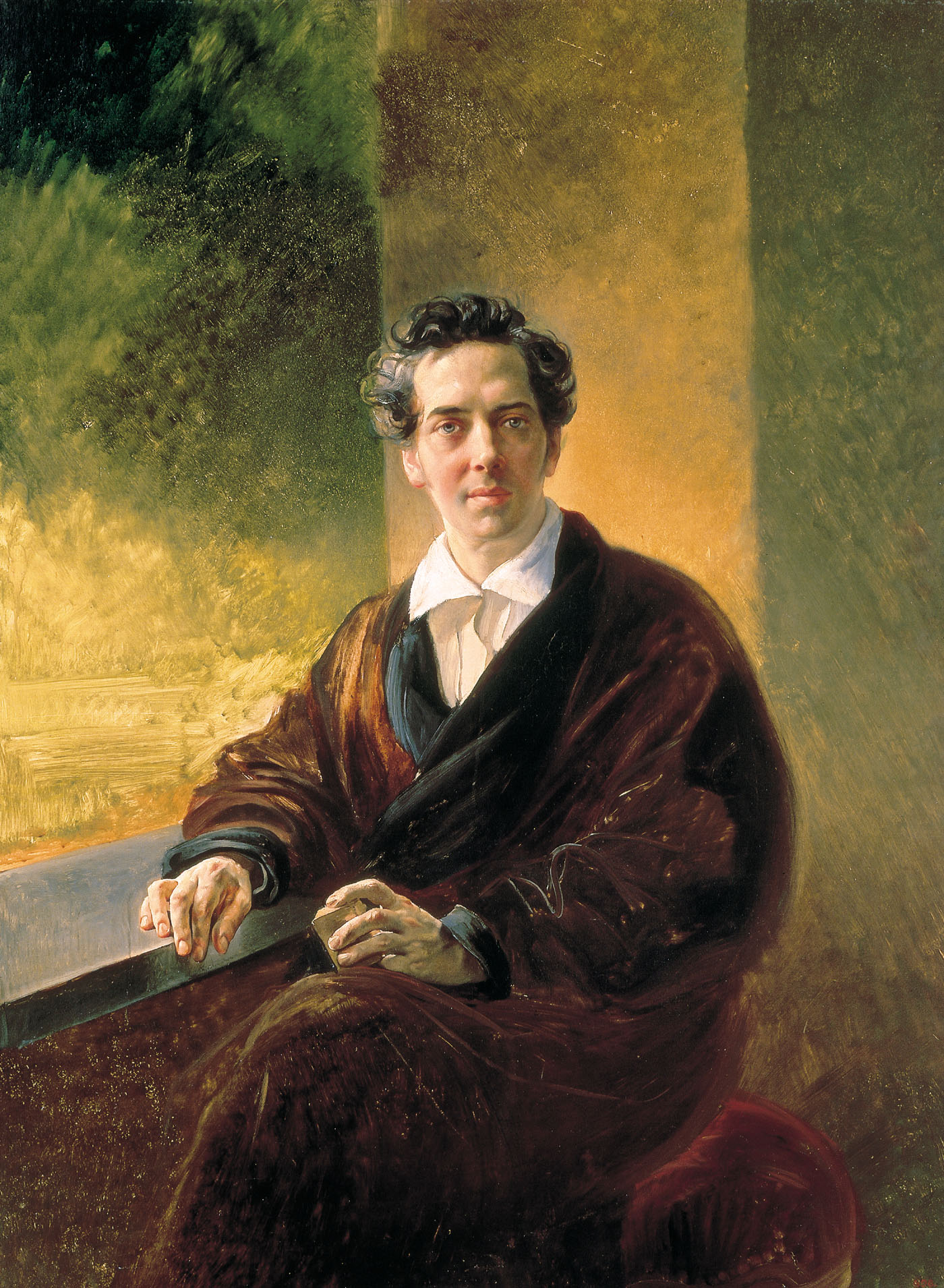
Portrait of Count Alexey Perovsky by Karl Briullov, 1835

Alexey Alexeyevich Perovsky (Russian: Алексе́й Алексе́евич Перо́вский; 1787 – 21 July [O.S. 9 July] 1836), known by his pen name Antony Pogorelsky (Russian: Анто́ний Погоре́льский), was a Russian prose writer.

He was a natural son of A.K. Razumovsky and an uncle of Aleksey Konstantinovich Tolstoy, also a well-known man of letters.

During the Patriotic War of 1812 (invasion of Napoleon Bonaparte) he served in the acting army as a volunteer. When living in Germany during his military service Perovsky took a great interest in German romanticism, and Hoffman, in particular, and it had a great impact on his own creativity. After retirement he settled in Petersburg and took care of upbringing and education of his nephew Aleksey. During that period Perovsky came to be one of the most active defenders of Alexander Pushkin, then a beginning poet.

After the death of his father in 1822, Aleksey Perovsky settled in Pogoreltsy Estate in Ukraine, together with his sister and nephew and took the penname of Antony Pogorelsky, based on the estate name.

Antony Pogorelsky's set of stories Dvoinik (The Double, or My Evenings in Little Russia) (1828) was closely related to the German fantastic tradition (Serapion Brothers by Hoffman) and anticipated the famous Evenings on a Farm Near Dikanka by Nikolai Gogol and Russian Nights by Vladimir Odoevsky. In 1829 Pogorelsky published the book that brought him real fame: it was the fairy tale Black Hen, or Living Underground written for his nephew, the first book about childhood in Russian literature. His novel Monastyrka, a “moral-descriptive novel” combining both sentimental and romantic elements was very well accepted by public and critics.
