= Yury Golovkin =

Russian diplomat

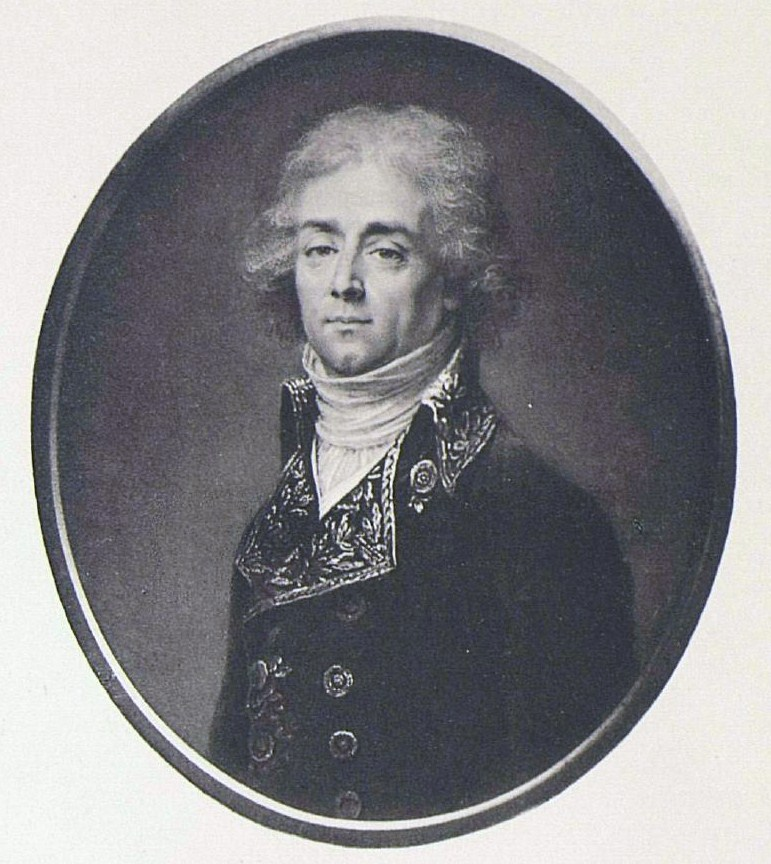
Count Golovkin in the 1790s

Count Yurii Alexandrovich Golovkin (Russian: Ю́рий Алекса́ндрович Голо́вкин; 1 July 1762 – 21 January 1846) was a Russian diplomat who served as Russian minister (ambassador) in Stuttgart (1813–1818) and in Vienna (1818–1822), but is best remembered for his leadership of the ambitious mission to China despatched in 1805.

== Ancestry ==
Golovkin was born in Lausanne to Count Alexander Alexandrovich Golovkin and his wife, Baroness Wilhelmina-Justina von Mosheim. He was brought up in Paris as a Protestant. His father was a grandson of Peter the Great's chancellor, Gavriil Golovkin. On his death Wilhelmina-Justina remarried Jean-Louis-Paul-François, 5th duc de Noailles. After the fall of the Ancien Régime in France, Yury went to Russia and entered the service of Catherine the Great.

== China mission ==
The Russian Vice-Minister of Foreign Affairs, Prince Adam Jerzy Czartoryski, had been preparing a mission to China for several years, partly in response to the growing Napoleonic hold over Europe, which left Russia with few possibilities for expansion. The resulting embassy was in some respects Russia's answer to the embassy sent by Britain in 1793 under Earl Macartney, for the economic importance of Russian trade with China through the Russian-American Company was very significant. The Treaty of Kyakhta (1727) had permitted trade at the town of Kyakhta on the Russian-Chinese border (now the Russian-Mongolian border), roughly halfway between Irkutsk and Urga (present-day Ulaanbaatar). However, the growth of European trade with China on the Chinese coast in and around Canton was giving rise to the future of Russian trade with China and in February 1803 Count Nikolay Rumyantsev, the Minister of Commerce, proposed a full-scale assault on what he saw as the commercial isolation of East Asia. In the end there were three components to this strategy; the first was Golovkin's mission, which travelled overland across Siberia in the winter, the second was Nikolai Rezanov’s mission to Japan, and the third was Adam Johann von Krusenstern’s circumnavigation of the globe, the first achieved by a Russian ship. The pretext of the Golovkin mission was to inform the Chinese government of the accession of Tsar Alexander I, but the real objective was to secure permission for Russian ships to enter Canton, to negotiate for the opening of a Russian consulate in Beijing and to secure Chinese agreement to the despatch of a Russian mission to Tibet.

Early in January 1806 Golovkin and his cortège reached Urga on their way to Beijing. In Urga, in bitterly cold weather, the entire company were invited to attend an open-air reception at which they were expected to perform the kowtow before a table on which stood a wooden tablet and three candles. Golovkin refused, declaring that he would be happy to prostrate himself before the emperor but could not do so before a piece of wood. With that, the prospects for the mission melted away, and Golovkin and his large train had to retrace their steps to Irkutsk and then Saint Petersburg.

== Ramifications ==
Nothing significant has been written on the Golovkin expedition, even in Russia, since 1875. For the post-war period that may largely be due to the enforced sensitivities of Soviet scholars to the delicacy of Sino-Soviet relations, for, as one of them put it in 1959, it was all a question of the penetration and exploitation of the Chinese market, and that was hardly a friendly act.

The Golovkin embassy was a political failure, but it provided a unique intellectual opportunity which was not missed by contemporaries in Saint Petersburg. Filipp Vigel, whose reminiscences are a valuable source for the workings of Russian upper-class society in the nineteenth century, recorded that the prospect of travelling to China excited much interest; his own motives for participating were, however, somewhat mercenary, for he was short of money and it was only through his influential connections that he was able to land himself with a well-paid position on the embassy in a clerical capacity. More significantly, the embassy included a party of scientists and other ‘savants’ under the direction of the Academy of Sciences and under the leadership of Count Jan Potocki (1761–1815). Potocki's leadership of the scientific team was not simply a matter of his personal connections with the fellow Pole, Prince Adam Jerzy Czartoryski, for his intellectual and political credentials for fulfilling that role were impeccable, and without him it is unlikely that the brilliant German orientalist, Julius Klaproth, would have had any part to play in the mission. Others in the party of scientists carried out a detailed exploration of Siberia, studies of the flora and fauna, and so on.
