= Leslie Grade =

British talent agent (1916–1979)

- Grade in 1969
- Born: Laszlo Winogradsky; 3 June 1916; London, England
- Died: 15 October 1979 (aged 63); Fréjus, Var, France
- Occupation: Talent agent
- Board member of: Grade Organisation (1943–66); Leyton Orient F.C.
- Spouses: Lynn Smith; Audrey Smith
- Children: 4, including Michael
- Relatives: Lew Grade (brother); Bernard Delfont (brother)

Leslie Grade (3 June 1916 – 15 October 1979), born Laszlo (or Lazarus) Winogradsky, was a British theatrical talent agent. In 1943, he co-founded the Grade Organisation (also known as Lew and Leslie Grade Ltd) with his elder brother, the impresario and producer Lew Grade (1906–98). During the 1940s, the company became the UK's most successful light entertainment talent agency.

== Life and career ==
Grade, the youngest of three brothers, was born in London in 1916, four years after his Jewish family had emigrated from Tokmak, Imperial Russia (now Ukraine) in response to pogroms. Leslie and his siblings, Lew and Bernard (1909–94), were raised in Stepney. While their parents, Isaac and Olga, worked in the textile industry, the brothers left school at the age of 14 to establish themselves in showbusiness.

With Lew, Grade became one of the UK's best-known and most respected entertainment industry executives. During the late 1940s, his clients included Jack Benny, Bob Hope and Danny Kaye. In the 1950s and 1960s, many artists represented by Grade appeared in the variety show Sunday Night at the London Palladium, broadcast by Lew's ITV franchisee Associated Television (ATV). Grade's career was curtailed by a series of strokes in the mid-1960s, and the ownership of the Grade Organisation passed to Grade's son Michael in 1966. In 1967, the Grade Organisation was acquired by EMI and Leslie and his brothers joined the EMI board. Part of it was renamed London Management under Michael's direction.

Leslie Grade's first wife Lynn Smith left him for the wrestling commentator Kent Walton, whom she married in 1949. Grade had two additional children by his second marriage, to Audrey Smith: theatrical agent Anita Grade (wife of Harold Brook Land, son of the impresario David Land) and Antony Grade, formerly vice-president of Exterior Design for Renault and later Head of Design for Avtovaz. With his friend Harry Zussman, Grade served, for many years, as a Director of Leyton Orient F.C.

Grade died in France in 1979. Unlike his brothers, he was not awarded a peerage or a knighthood.
