= Fruktove =

Village in Sevastopol City, Crimea

Coordinates: 44.6806°N 33.6028°E

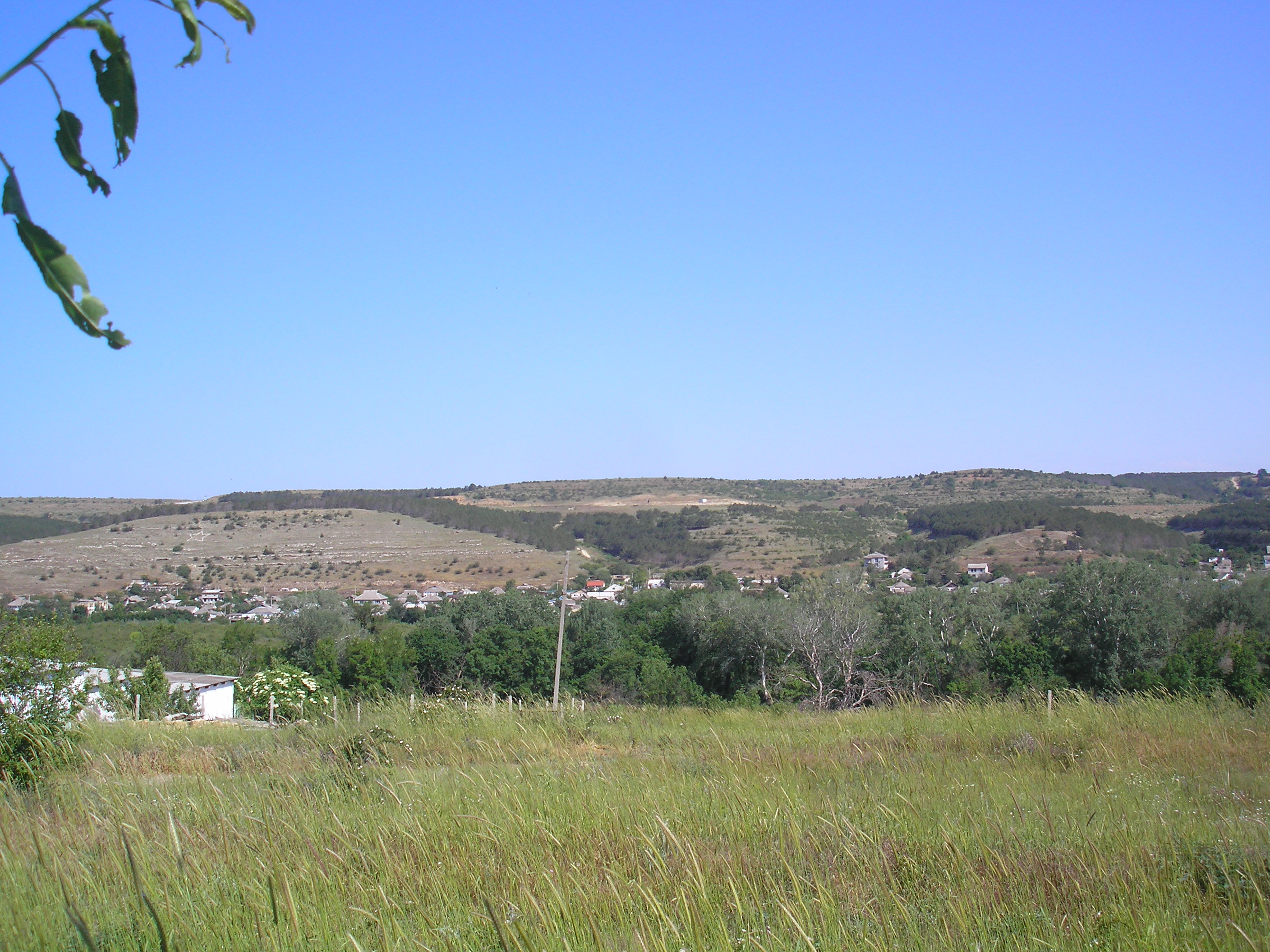
An image of Fruktove

Fruktove (Crimean Tatar: Бельбек; detatarized name: Ukrainian: Фруктове, romanized: Fruktove; Russian: Фруктовое) is a village in Crimea. It was first established in the 18th century and is currently the site of the Sevastopol International Airport. Ivan Petrovich Koroliuk, a soldier who was killed in action and posthumously awarded for his service in the Crimean offensive against Axis forces during World War II, is buried in the village.
