= Simferopolsky Uyezd =

Simferopolsky Uyezd (Симферопольский уезд) was one of the subdivisions of the Taurida Governorate of the Russian Empire. It was situated in the southern part of the governorate, in southern Crimea. Its administrative centre was Simferopol.

== Demographics ==
At the time of the Russian Empire Census of 1897, Simferopolsky Uyezd had a population of 141,717. Of these, 44.4% spoke Crimean Tatar, 30.2% Russian, 7.1% Ukrainian, 6.5% Yiddish, 4.1% German, 2.1% Armenian, 1.7% Greek, 1.2% Polish, 1.0% Bulgarian, 0.4% Estonian, 0.4% Belarusian, 0.2% Czech, 0.1% Turkish, 0.1% Romani, 0.1% French and 0.1% Moldovan or Romanian as their native language.
