= Filipp Vigel =

Russian memoirist (1786–1856)

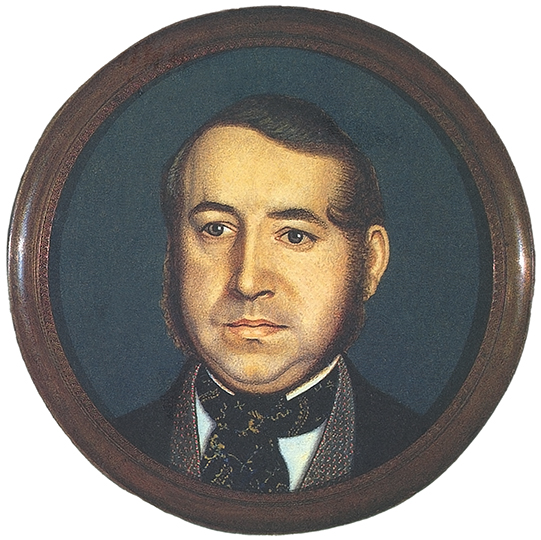
Portrait, 1836

Filipp Filippovich Vigel (Philip Philipovich Weigel; Russian: Филипп Филиппович Вигель; 23 November [O.S. 12 November] 1786 – 1 April [O.S. 20 March] 1856) was a Russian memoirist. In the course of his official career, he served in the foreign ministry, accompanied Count Golovkin on his 1805 mission to China, presided over the department of foreign religions and governed the town of Kerch.

Weigel witnessed every major event of Alexander I's reign and conversed with other Russian cultural figures. His colleagues at the Arzamas Society included Alexander Pushkin, who gently mocked Weigel's homosexual proclivities in a verse epistle.

== Life ==
Weigel's father, an aristocrat from Estland, of Swedish extraction, was the first governor of Penza (from 1801 to 1809). Filipp was brought up in Moscow and at Zubrilovka, the Middle Volga estate of Prince Potemkin’s niece, where Ivan Krylov tutored the hostess’s sons. He served in the Moscow Archive of the College of Foreign Affairs, where he met his future patron, Dmitry Bludov. In 1805, he joined Golovkin’s diplomatic mission to China.

During his time in Paris in the 1810s, Weigel found himself entangled in a curious incident: a barber’s apprentice who stayed over at his place stole his gold watch. The famed detective Vidocq helped recover the item. At gatherings of the Arzamas literary circle, Weigel was nicknamed "Ibycus's crane". He had a passion for collecting engravings and lithographs. His remarkable collection of 3,139 lithographic and engraved portraits was donated to Moscow University.

Known affectionately as “Filippushka” by those close to him, Weigel maintained a friendly correspondence with Vasily Zhukovsky and was acquainted with Alexander Pushkin, while they both lived in Kishinev in 1823. In a letter, he complained to Pushkin: “Though my sins—or rather, my sin—are great, they’re not so grave that fate would consign me to this wretched cesspool.” In his reply, Pushkin recommended “three charming youngsters” to Weigel to lighten his mood, noting that “the youngest one, I think, is fit for your particular use: NB, he sleeps in the same room as his brother, and they’re mercilessly shaking there—you can draw significant conclusions from this, which I leave to your experience and discretion.”

While governing Kerch from 1826 to 1829, Weigel documented the Royal Kurgan and sought to compile a catalog of all the ancient burial mounds in the surrounding area. He spent the remainder of his life in Moscow, where he was also laid to rest.

== Memoirs ==
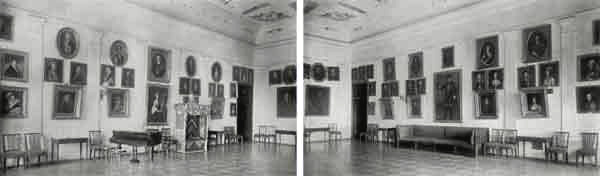
A gallery of family portraits at the Zubrilovka manor (where Weigel was brought up)

Weigel is remembered primarily for his copious memoirs covering the history of Russia from the reign of Emperor Paul to the November Uprising (1831). They were published by Mikhail Katkov in 1864; the expanded edition (1892) appeared in seven books. Weigel's reminiscences are engaging, pithy and readily quotable.

A parade of historical figures crossed paths with Weigel. He witnessed the ascension of Paul to the throne, knew Nicholas Pavlovich when he was still a grand duke, encountered the family of Emelyan Pugachev, mingled with Freemasons and Martinists, and attended Quaker gatherings at the Mikhailovsky Castle. His memoirs vividly portray a swarm of historical figures: e.g., Paul’s Turkish servant, Count Kutaisov; the famed sopranos of the day (such as Elisabeth Mara); the poet-minister Dmitriev; the rabid duellist Tolstoy (nicknamed "the American"); the military commander Bagration; and Kapodistrias, the founder of modern Greece.

In Penza, where his father served as governor, Weigel met Mikhail Speransky, then a disgraced figure likened to “Napoleon on Elba,” already toppled and resigned. He saw the aging Pyotr Rumyantsev, "the scourge of the Turks", living out his days in quiet retirement. The appointment of Kutuzov to the army, the twists and turns of war and peace, the swirl of rumors and gossip about court intrigues and battles, Speransky’s fall and exile, the first vague reports of Alexander I’s death, and the Decembrist conspiracy — all these are chronicled in Weigel’s Notes.

The old-world lifestyle, aristocratic hauteur, leisurely travel along rough roads filled with adventures and chance encounters, and the machinations of officialdom are all depicted with vibrant color in Weigel’s calm, unhurried style. Yet when it comes to certain individuals, such as Gogol, Weigel’s perspective can be narrow and biased, veering into prejudice that borders on reactionary zeal. It was Weigel who denounced Chaadayev to the authorities.
