= Berdyansky Uyezd =

Subdivision of Taurida Governorate, Russian Empire

- Uezd
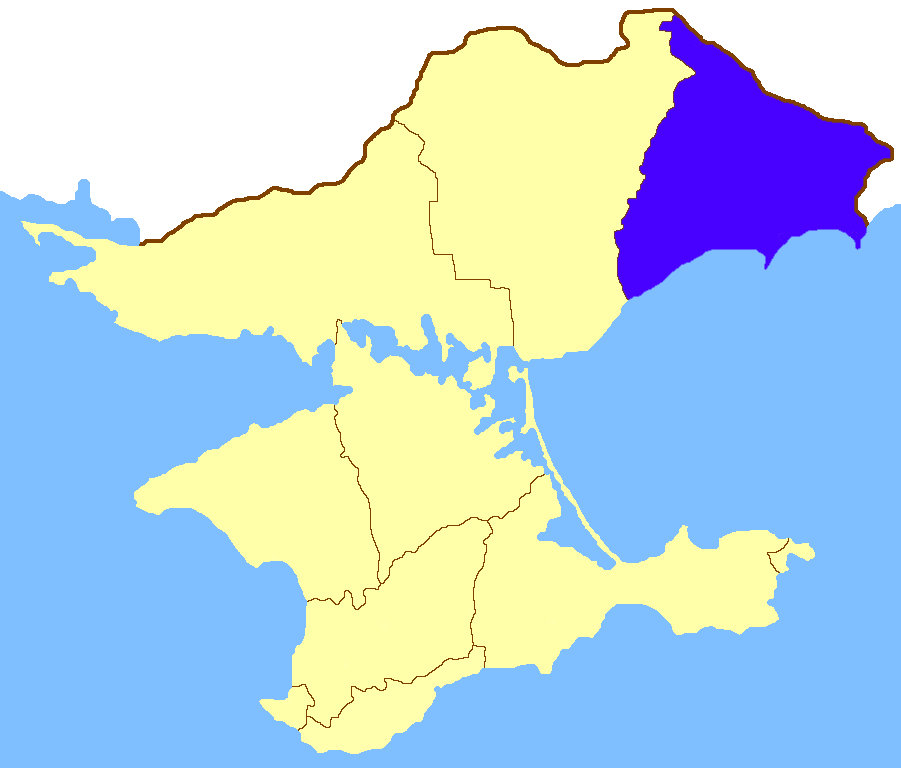
- Location in the Taurida Governorate
- Country: Russian Empire
- Governorate: Taurida
- Established: 1842
- Abolished: 1918
- Capital: Berdiansk

Population (1897)
  - Total: 304,718

Berdyansky Uyezd (Russian: Бердянский уезд; Ukrainian: Бердянський повіт) was one of the subdivisions of the Taurida Governorate of the Russian Empire. Its administrative centre was Berdiansk. Other populous places in the uyezd were Dmytrivka and Tokmak.

It was established in 1842.

== Demographics ==
At the time of the Russian Empire Census of 1897, Berdyansky Uyezd had a population of 304,718. Of these, 58.8% spoke Ukrainian, 18.1% Russian, 10.4% Bulgarian, 7.8% German, 2.9% Yiddish, 0.5% Moldovan or Romanian, 0.4% Belarusian, 0.3% Tatar, 0.2% Greek, 0.1% Turkish, 0.1% Mordvin, 0.1% Polish, 0.1% Armenian and 0.1% Italian as their native language.
