= Taurida Governorate =

1802–1918 unit of Russia

Coordinates: 44.9481°N 34.1042°E

- Governorate
- 1802–1918
- Coat of arms

- Location in the Russian Empire
- Capital: Simferopol
- Area
  - (1897): 63,538 km^{2} (24,532 sq mi)
- Population
  - (1897): 1,447,790
- History
  - Established: 1802
  - Abolished: 1918
Preceded by	Succeeded by
Newrussia Governorate	Crimean Regional Government

Taurida Governorate (Note: Russian: Таври́ческая губе́рния, pre-reform orthography: Таври́ческая губе́рнія, romanized: Tavrícheskaya gubérniya; Ukrainian: Таврі́йська губе́рнія, romanized: Tavríisʼka hubérniia; Crimean Tatar: Таврида губерниясы, romanized: Tavrida guberniyası) was an administrative-territorial unit (guberniya) of the Russian Empire. It included the territory of the Crimean Peninsula and the mainland between the lower Dnieper River with the coasts of the Black Sea and Sea of Azov. It formed after the Taurida Oblast was abolished in 1802 during Paul I's administrative reform of the territories of the former Crimean Khanate, which were annexed by Russia from the Ottoman Empire in 1783. The governorate's centre was the city of Simferopol. The name of the province was derived from Taurida (Greek: Ταυρική), a historical name for Crimea.

Today the territory of the governorate is part of the Autonomous Republic of Crimea, Kherson and Zaporizhzhia Oblasts of Ukraine, which were annexed by Russia after their 2022 invasion, but remain internationally recognized as part of Ukraine.

Almost all of the territory of the governorate is, as of September 2025, controlled by Russia, with Ukrainian control limited to two small areas of the north, with Orikhiv being the only significant settlement not captured.

== History ==
In 1783, the Khanate of Crimea was annexed from the Ottoman Empire by Catherine the Great’s Russia. Soon after, Taurida Oblast was established. During the reign of Paul I the oblast was abolished, but in 1802 re-established as a governorate (guberniya). It was a part of the Russian Empire until the Russian Revolution of 1918.

Following the 1917 October Revolution, the ethnic Tatar government proclaimed the Crimean People's Republic on December 13, 1917, which was the first Muslim Democratic state. The Tatar republic covered the peninsular portion of the former governorate, while its northern counties ended up temporarily under jurisdiction of the Yekaterinoslav Governorate. However neither Ukraine nor the Crimea managed to hold on to their territories and were overrun by Bolshevik Red Guards in the winter of 1917-18. Briefly in early 1918 the bolsheviks split the governorate territories between the Taurida Soviet Socialist Republic and the Donetsk-Krivoi Rog Soviet Republic before being overrun by the forces of the Ukrainian People's Republic with military assistance from the German Empire.

== Geography ==
The governorate bordered Yekaterinoslav Governorate and Kherson Governorate to its north. The Strait of Kerch bordered the Free lands of the Don Cossacks. It has natural borders, being surrounded by the waters of the Black Sea and the Sea of Azov.

The mainland and the peninsular parts of the region differ significantly. The total area of the governorate was 63,538 km^{2} (24,532 sq mi) of which the mainland portion consisted of 38,405 km^{2} (14,828 sq mi) and is largely black earth steppe land. The population of the whole region was 1,634,700 in 1906. At that time, the mainland part of the governorate was mostly populated by Ukrainians and a large Russian minority, but had significant ethnic minorities of Germans, Bulgarians, Armenians and Jews, while major ethnic groups of the Crimean peninsula were Crimean Tatars and Russians with German, Greek, Poles, Armenian, and Karaim minorities, while the far north and east of the peninsula was mostly inhabited by Ukrainians. Major urban centres were Simferopol, Sevastopol, Theodosia, Bakhchisaray, and Yalta in Crimea, and Aleshki, Berdyansk, and Melitopol on the mainland.

== Administrative divisions ==
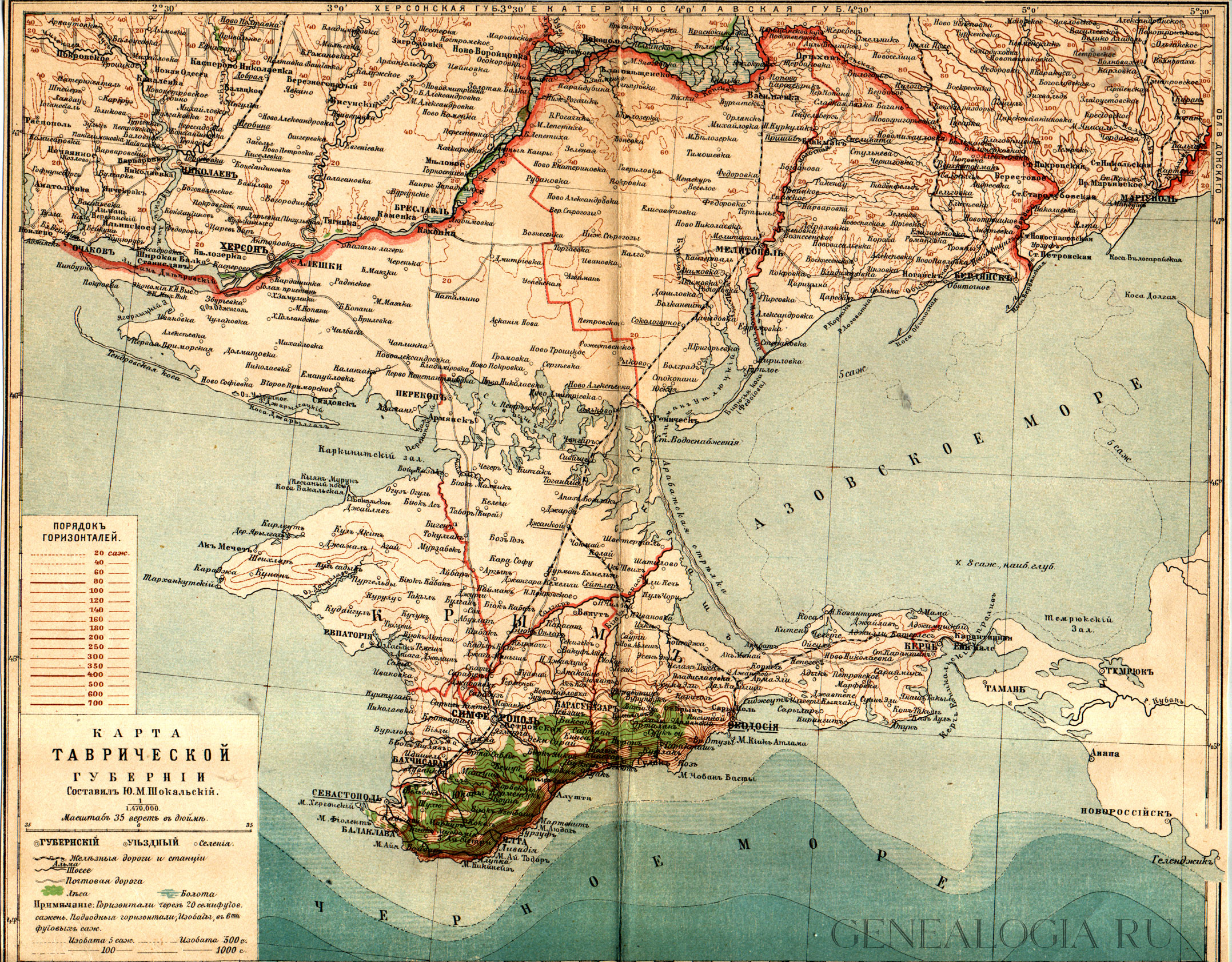
Taurida Governorate Map

The governorate comprised three counties (uyezds) on the mainland:

- Berdyansky Uyezd, centred in Berdyansk
- Dneprovsky Uyezd, Oleshky
- Melitopolsky Uyezd, Melitopol

and five counties and two city authorities (gradonachalstvo) on the peninsula:

- Yevpatoriysky Uyezd, Yevpatoria
- Perekopsky Uyezd, Perekop
- Simferopolsky Uyezd, Simferopol
- Feodosiysky Uyezd, Feodosiya
- Yaltinsky Uyezd, Yalta
- City of Kerch, Yeni-Kale fortress
- City of Sevastopol

Before 1820 the governorate consisted of seven counties, including Tmutarakan county on the Taman Peninsula on the eastern side of the Kerch Strait. The Yalta and Berdyansk counties formed later. From 1804 to 1829 there also existed the gradonachalstvo of Feodosiya; and in 1914 Yalta county became the gradonachalstvo of Yalta.

In December 1917 the governorate split, with most of the peninsula forming the Crimean People's Republic (1917-1918), while the rest remained in qn undefined status including the city of Sevastopol, which remained the main naval base of the Black Sea Fleet of the Russian Republic. The mainland counties were declared part of the Ukrainian People's Republic, yet remained under the effective jurisdiction of the Taurida Governorate.

On November 20, [O.S. November 7] 1917 the Third Universal of the Tsentralna Rada of the Ukrainian People's Republic proclaimed the territory of the Ukrainian Republic as comprising: Volyn Governorate, Kiev Governorate, Podolia Governorate, Chernigov Governorate, Poltava Governorate, Kharkov Governorate, Yekaterinoslav Governorate, Kherson Governorate and Taurida Governorate (not including Crimea).

After occupation of Ukraine by Bolsheviks during the Ukrainian–Soviet War, the Taurida Governorate became finally split between Russian soviet republics of the Donetsk-Krivoi Rog Soviet Republic and Taurida Socialist Republic of Soviets.

== Language ==
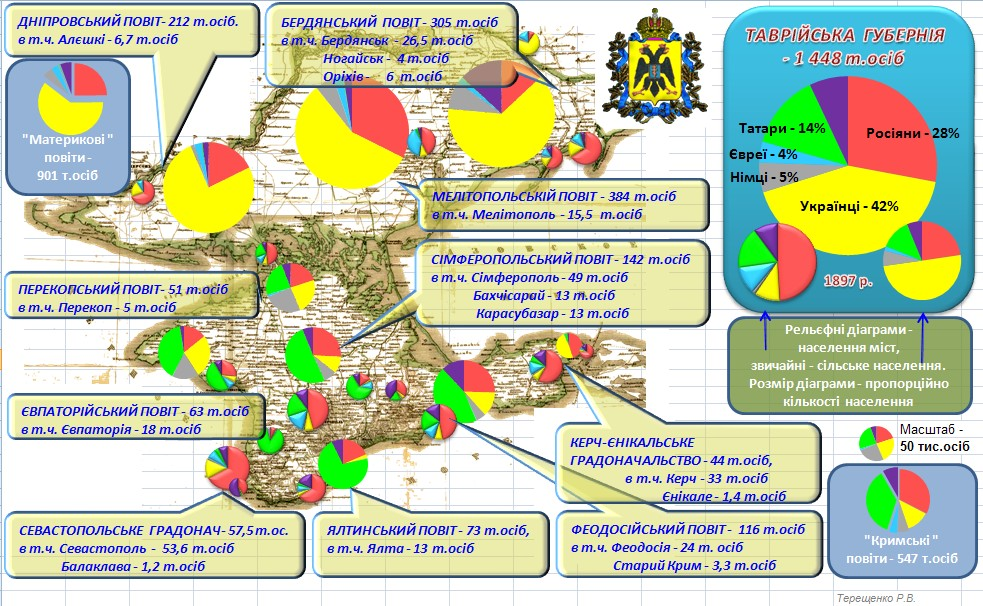
The linguistic composition of the uyezds (povits) of Taurida in 1897. Ukrainians in yellow, Russians in red, Crimean Tatars in green, Germans in gray, Yiddish speakers in blue, and others in purple. (in Ukrainian)

The Imperial census of 1897 found that the population of the governorate consisted of 1,447,790, with 762,804 male and 684,986 female.

Language	Number	Percentage (%)
Ukrainian	611,121	42.21
Russian	404,463	27.94
Belarusian	9,726	0.67
Polish	10,112	0.70
Czech	1,962	0.14
Bulgarian	41,260	2.85
Romanian	2,259	0.16
Italian	1,121	0.08
German	78,305	5.41
Roma	1,433	0.10
Yiddish	55,418	3.83
Greek	18,048	1.25
Armenian	8,938	0.62
Estonian	2,210	0.15
Tatar	196,854	13.60
Turkish	2,197	0.15
Persons that did not identify their native language	71	<0.01
Other	2,292	0.16

In 1897 289,316 people lived in the cities, constituting 19.98% of the total population. The ethnicities of the urban population were Russians (49.1%), Tatars (17.16%), and Jews (11.84%), with only 31 people living in cities who chose not to disclose their identity.

== Religion ==
By the Imperial census of 1897 there were around 1,100,000 Eastern Orthodox followers, just over 30,000 Catholic, around 70,000 Protestant Christians and about the same number of Judaic followers. Only 13% of population were Muslims (known in the Russian Empire as Magometians) who mainly lived in the peninsular portion of the guberniya, Crimea itself. They were the main force that after the next 10 years established the first Muslim democratic state of the Crimean People's Republic. Beside the Magometians and Jews there were only eight (8) other non-Christian followers in the whole guberniya (not necessarily Atheists).

Religion	Number	Percentage (%)
Eastern Orthodox	1,069,556	73.88
Magometians (Muslims)	190,800	13.18
Rabbinic Jews (including Subbotniks)	60,752	4.20
Lutherans	42,654	2.95
Roman Catholics	29,393	2.03
Mennonites	25,508	1.76
Old Believers	13,724	0.95
Armenian-Gregorians	7,494	0.52
Karaite Jews	6,166	0.43
Armenian-Catholics	1,206	0.08
Other (Reformators, Anglicans, Baptists, Spiritual Christians, others)	537	0.04
