= German jazz =

Music genre

An overview of the evolution of Jazz music in Germany reveals that the development of jazz in Germany and its public notice differ from the "motherland" of jazz, the US, in several respects.

== The 1920s ==
One of the first books with the word "jazz" in the title originates from Germany. In his book Jazz – Eine Musikalische Zeitfrage (Jazz – A Musical Issue) of 1927, Paul Bernhard relates the term Jazz to a specific dance. When dancer Josephine Baker visited Berlin in 1925, she found it dazzling. "The city had a jewel-like sparkle," she said, "the vast cafés reminded me of ocean liners powered by the rhythms of their orchestras. There was music everywhere." Eager to look ahead after the crushing defeat of World War I, Weimar Germany embraced the modernism that swept through Europe and was crazy about jazz. In the dancing mania of the post-war period, there were not only modern dances such as the tango and foxtrot, but in 1920 also the Shimmy and in 1922 the Two-step. In 1925 the Charleston dominated the dance halls. Even when under great criticism Bernhard Sekles initiated the first academic jazz studies anywhere at the Hoch Conservatory in Frankfurt in 1928 – the first courses in the United States were started in the mid-1940s. The director of the jazz department was Mátyás Seiber. The jazz studies were closed by The Nazis in 1933.

The first mass-produced jazz records came out in the United States in 1917. By January 1920, "Tiger Rag" had already been marketed by a German record company. In the early 1920s, the clarinetist and saxophonist Eric Borchard was making recordings in Germany. Borchard's first recordings show a heavy influence of Alcide Nunez; he soon developed his own style. By 1924 his band was comparable to good American bands such as the Original Memphis Five. Borchard's band included New Orleans trombonist Emile Christian. From 1920 to 1923, due to both economic turmoil and inflation, larger German jazz orchestras that played the new jazz dances were a rarity. Initially, a trio with a pianist, a drummer and a "Stehgeiger" (standing violinist), who also played the saxophone, was most common. Only after 1924 an economic stability was achieved, and an economic basis for larger dance orchestras was possible, like those founded by Bernard Etté, Dajos Béla, Marek Weber, Efim Schachmeister, and Stefan Weintraub. It was the predominant element of improvisation that was met with a lack of understanding in Germany, where people had always played concrete written notes; Marek Weber, for example, demonstratively left the podium if its nightly band played jazz interludes.

In 1920–23, there was a period of economic turbulence and inflation in Germany, until 1924 when the market stabilized and money was invested in entertainment. Consequently, the mid-1920s brought forth a growth of larger bands who agreed to play jazz music. The two most popular German bands that showed the influence of American jazz were Eric Borchard's small combo, and Stefan Weintraub's Syncopators.

Radio also had a role in jazz. In 1926, the radio began to regularly play jazz music, and as time progressed, by 1930, artists such as Louis Armstrong, Duke Ellington, Paul Godwin's band, Red Nichols, and Peter Kreuder became popular with German audiences. The listeners were particularly partial to American black musicians such as Armstrong and Ellington, instead of their own German jazz musicians. In the 1920s, jazz in Germany was primarily a fad. The "Salonorchester" turned to the new style, because dancers wanted it so. By 1924, the first jazz could be heard on the radio; after 1926, when Paul Whiteman enjoyed sensational success in Berlin, regular radio programmes were broadcast with jazz played live. His music was also available on record and in sheet music. The Weintraub Syncopators were the first hot jazz band in Germany at their summit beginning around 1928. Musicians from many musical backgrounds, composers of classical music concerts such as Paul Hindemith, Ernst Krenek and Kurt Weill, turned to the new music genre that came from America and incorporated it into their musical language. For the classical composers, the orchestral casts, the timbre, syncope, and blues harmonies of jazz were a synonym for the modern era. This new music genre was recognised not only as a fashion and entertainment music, but as real art. However, as early as in 1927, the composer Karol Rathaus called it somewhat prematurely a Jazzdämmerung (jazz twilight). Theodor W. Adorno criticized the popular jazz of this period as predominantly functional music (Gebrauchsmusik) for the upper classes, having little if any connection to the African-American tradition.

Jazz was found as an uncommon link between the blacks and Jews. Jews at that time were recognized in jazz, not just as musicians and composers, but also as commercial managers, serving as the middlemen of the music. After the Great War in Germany, Negrophobia coalesced with the preexisting anti-Semitism and flourished, especially since Jews were often depicted as having a racial affinity with blacks, possessing similar objectionable qualities. Jews were prevalent figures in new art forms such as jazz, cabaret, and film. Often, a great number of jazz band leaders were Jews, many from Eastern Europe, including Bela, Weber, Efim Schachmeister, Paul Godwin, and Ben Berlin.

== Years of National Socialism, the 1930s and the missing 1940s ==
Jazz was much more than just a creative pastime; in fact, people saw jazz as the "essence of the era's modernism", a strong surge toward greater equality and emancipation, posing as a perfect advocate for a democracy in Germany. With its debonair, carefree interdependence on chorus-line culture of the cabarets of Berlin, some dubbed jazz as the "incarnation of American vitalism". Yet, despite the liberal attitudes of the Weimar democracy, the public and private sentiment toward blacks, including African Americans, was ambivalent; there was a lack of black jazz musicians in Germany. Regardless of their social situation, the deeply engrained and institutionalized racism of German society was not tolerant of black people. For instance, many nationalistic student fraternities rejected student members who were of color or married to women of color. Furthermore, in 1932, all the conservative musicians and critics were denigrating jazz as a product of "Negro" culture, which provided the government the fodder to forbid the hiring of black musicians. Thus, for many African-American artists, popularity was a mere facade of a grim reality of being seen as a "racial alien". One critic even went as far as to call jazz a mere "negro noise", having only one purpose: "to introduce obscenities into society."

Paul Schewers, a music critic, brought forth crude images of lewdly dancing black boys and girls in the service of procreation, implying that the lower forces were always surging through blacks, overtaking the rational light of morality and reason the way the white man grasped it. Undoubtedly, sensuality has an affinity with dance, and it was pervasive in jazz and in the lyrics, but this became a means of judging it as void of morality, and even aesthetics, reduced to being inferior to "high German culture".

In neighbouring European countries the trend continued in the 1930s. Fan magazines were created for jazz and so-called "hot clubs". The Nazi regime pursued and banned the broadcasting of jazz on German radio, partly because of its African roots and because many of the active jazz musicians were of Jewish origin; and partly due to the music's certain themes of individuality and freedom. For the Nazis, jazz was an especially threatening form of expression. An anti-jazz radio broadcast From the Cake Walk to Hot sought a deterrent effect with "particularly insisting musical examples".

Perhaps the source of the critique against jazz was the modernity it implied; in fact, many of the jazz critics were those who were against any form of modernity. Those World War I veterans with Fascist pretensions and of the anti-Semitic Freikorps banded with other members in the National Socialist movement in denouncing Jews and blacks. This burgeoning hatred of jazz and its subculture infected the entire Nazi party structure that Adolf Hitler and his followers were trying so desperately to erect.

Hitler was not fond of modernism in the arts, which included music; in the Nazi party's program of February 1920, he threatened to enforce future governmental laws against such inclinations in art and literature. Even though he never publicly spoke out against jazz specifically in the Weimar Republic, one can infer that Hitler's sentiments toward jazz must have had strong ties to his perception of racial hierarchy, with jazz, not surprisingly, being at the very bottom.

In the 1930s, jazz began to see its downturn and started to suffer. Jazz's potential for being linked with the down-trodden minorities and pariahs of German society – the blacks and Jews – rendered it suspect. The future policies emerging against jazz were encouraged by German musicologists and radio spokesmen. In 1935, attempting to widen the perceived gap between "Nigger-Jew Jazz" and "German Jazz", Hans Otto Fricke used his prominent status as the director of "Radio Frankfurt", giving a two-part lecture series on the subject. To a great extent, Jazz shared a similar fate with other postwar modernist art such as atonal music. It wasn't until 1931 that many crucial British and American jazz players began to leave the country as they faced increasing xenophobic harassment from colleagues and authorities. Many thought that the death of jazz was upon them, but little did they anticipate that it would be reborn into vitality and health under a dictatorship.

Up until 1935, Joseph Goebbels, the Reich Minister of Public Enlightenment and Propaganda, had hoped to convince and persuade the public via anti-jazz propaganda, rather than prohibit jazz. However, jazz was banned in 1935 (WFMU Staff). In 1935, the Nazi government did not allow German musicians of Jewish origin to perform any longer. The Weintraub Syncopators – most of whom were Jewish – were forced into exile. They worked abroad during much of the 1930s, touring throughout Europe, Asia, and the Middle East before settling in Australia in 1937. Even people with a single Jewish grandparent like swing trumpeter Hans Berry were forced to play undercover or to work abroad (in Belgium, the Netherlands or in Switzerland).

Other dance bands and musicians were not even that fortunate. For example, Mitja Nikisch, son of the celebrated classical conductor Arthur Nikisch and himself a respected classical pianist, had created a fine popular dance ensemble in the 1920s, the Mitja Nikisch Tanz Orchester, which played in prominent venues. The Nazi regime brought about its demise, leading Nikisch to commit suicide in 1936.

From 1937 onward, American musicians in Europe couldn't cross German borders. Admittedly, in spite of such persecution it was still possible, at least in major cities, to buy jazz records until the beginning of the war; however, the further development of, and the contact with, the American Jazz World were largely interrupted. The "Reichsmusikkammer" (Reichs Music Chamber) supported dance music that bore some traits of Swing, but listening to foreign stations, which regularly played jazz, was penalised from 1939 on. Even after certain songs and performers were banned in Germany, several radio stations played jazz music by printing a new, German-centric label. For example, the song "Tiger Rag" became "Schwarzer Panther", or the "black panther". "Joseph! Joseph!" became "Sie will nicht Blumen und nicht Schokolade", which translates as "She wants neither flowers nor chocolate" (WFMU Staff).

Some musicians did not want to follow this command. Thus, for example, when jazz was finally prohibited by the Nazis at the beginning of the war, the clarinettist Ernst Höllerhagen left Germany for exile in Switzerland. Similarly, after assisting with the "transplantation" of American jazz into German cafes, cabarets and theaters for nearly sixteen years (1914-1939), the guitarist Mike Danzi refused to carry out the Hitler salute publicly in 1939 and fled Nazism in order to return to the concert hall stage in the United States.

At that time, only a relatively small number of people in Germany knew how jazz music sounded in America – at that time, swing – and that it was jazz. With the pressing wartime effort from 1941 to 1943, the Nazis accidentally fostered the jazz craze by forcing bands from Nazi-occupied nations in Western Europe to perform, bringing hot swing. Eventually, the Nazi party realized that jazz could not be removed entirely from Germany (WFMU Staff). The Nazis even re-developed and newly produced some pieces, giving them new lyrics, in special studios. One example is the song "Black Bottom", which was presented as "Schwarzer Boden". For some Germans, the banned foreign stations with jazz programs were very popular.

The Nazis on the one hand would jam transmissions from the Allies' stations, but on the other hand would also copy them. The band Charlie and His Orchestra is considered as a negative example, also called Mr. Goebbels Jazz Band. Several of Germany's most talented swing musicians, such as saxophonist Lutz Templin and vocalist Karl "Charlie" Schwedler, were active in a jazz band. Here the Nazis replaced the original texts with their own provocative propaganda texts that were pro-Nazi and anti-American/British. For example, the lyrics for "Little Sir Echo" has anti-American/British appeal with lyrics such as "German U-boats are making you sore, You're always licked, not a victory came through ... You're nice, little fellow, but by now you should know that you can never win this war!" Goebbels' propaganda was broadcast over pirated short-wave frequencies into America, Britain, and Canada in order to spread fear and weaken the morale of Germany's enemies (WFMU Staff).

Negermusik ("Negro Music") was a pejorative term used by the Nazis during the Third Reich to signify musical styles and performances by African Americans that were of the jazz and swing music genres.

The situation intensified in 1942 with the entry of the United States in the war. For diplomats of foreign embassies and Wehrmacht members, a couple of jazz clubs continued to remain open in Berlin. In addition, individual, illegitimate venues and private parties still played jazz. In 1943 jazz record production was stopped.

The Swingjugend, or Swing Youth, was a movement among mainly youth from 14 to 20 years old who dressed, danced, and listened to jazz in defiance of the Nazi regime. The Nazi Party acted against this movement by detaining several of the young leaders of the Swing Youth and sending them to concentration camps. However, the Swing Youth continued to resist the Nazi party by participating in prohibited swing and jazz activities (Neuhaus). Charlie and His Orchestra was moved in the still bombproof province. Jazz was also incorporated into musical works such as operas and chamber music through "art-jazz", which utilized jazz-inspired and ragtime-inspired syncopated rhythms and modes. Famous operas such as Krenek's Jonny spielt auf! and Boris Blacher's Concertante Music for Orchestra are examples of art-jazz (Dexter).

The Nazi regime passed notorious edicts banning jazz records and muted trumpets calling them degenerate art or entartete Kunst. "Degenerate Music" was an exhibit sponsored by the Nazi regime that singled out "degeneracy" or the use of atonal music, jazz, discordant-sounding organization of tones and the individual composers and conductors, both of Aryan and non-Aryan descent. The "Degenerative Music" exhibit actually had the opposite effect of what the Nazis had hoped because soldiers became interested in genuine jazz (Potter). The documentary film Swing Under the Swastika looks at jazz music under the Nazi regime in Germany, and at the cases of the Madlung sisters who were sent to Ravensbruck concentration camp merely for owning jazz records. There are also interviews with jazz drummer and guitarist Coco Schumann and pianist Martin Roman, who were saved in the camps so they could and had to play for SS officers and during executions in Auschwitz as part of the "Ghetto Swingers".

== Postwar period and the 1950s ==
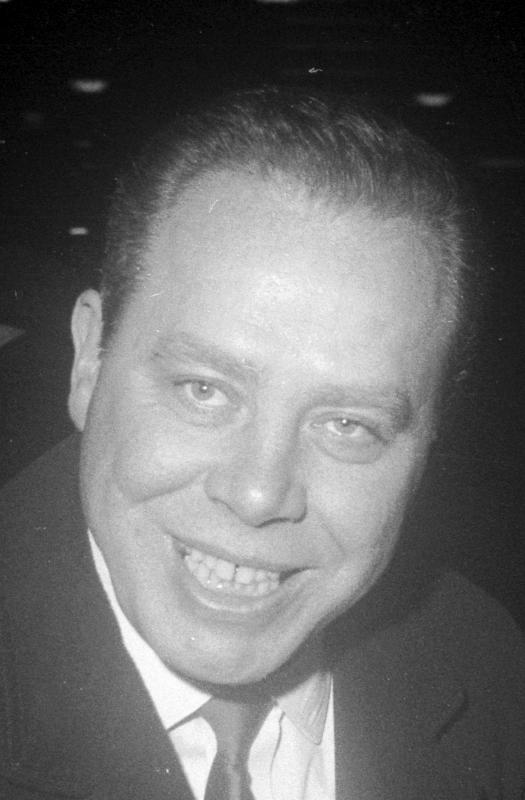
In 1950 Helmut Zacharias won the jazz-poll of American Forces Network Frankfurt as the best jazz violinist.

In the postwar period, and after nearly 20 years of isolation, many music fans as well as musicians themselves were very interested in the movements of jazz they had missed. In fact, jazz gave young people the enthusiastic hope for rebuilding the country. In the jazz clubs, jazz lovers played important records even before they could organize concerts. As World War II ended, jazz was imported to Germany via its strong footholds in England and France, and home-grown post-war jazz was able to develop, particularly in the American-occupied zone. Ironically, many German prisoners first heard jazz in French camps, and then the occupying Allied forces introduced those records and sheet music into the country. Berlin, Bremen and Frankfurt became centers of jazz. Young German musicians could perform before a larger audience in American GI venues.

In the 1950s, following the model established in Paris, "Existential" jazz cellars (referring to the French philosophy) emerged in numerous West German cities.

On April 2, 1951, Erwin Lehn founded the dance orchestra of the South German Radio (SDR) in Stuttgart, which he led until 1992. In a short time it developed from a radio-band to a modern swing big band: Erwin Lehn and his Südfunk Tanzorchester (southern radio dance orchestra). In 1955 Lehn, with Dieter Zimmerle and Wolfram Röhrig, initiated the SDR broadcast Treffpunkt Jazz. There Lehn played with international jazz greats such as Miles Davis and Chet Baker. In addition to Kurt Edelhagen's band at the Southwestern Radio (SWF), the Südfunk dance orchestra became one of the leading swing big bands in the Federal Republic of Germany in the following years. In 1953, Edelhagen discovered Caterina Valente in Baden-Baden as a singer for his big band.

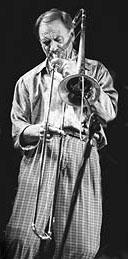
Albert Mangelsdorff, here much older than in 1960

American jazz musicians were heard at the Jazz at the Philharmonic concerts, and at events in the major concert halls in western Germany. Primarily, local musicians played in the clubs. In order to raise the level of cultural recognition, concert tours by the German Jazz Federation (a merger of the clubs) were increasingly organised. Until the end of the 1950s, the German jazz scene was strongly fixated on imitating American jazz, and on regaining the period of development it had previously missed. However, from 1954 on, West German jazz slowly departed from the pattern established by this musical role model. The quintet of pianist and composer Jutta Hipp played a central role in doing so; this group included the saxophonist Emil Mangelsdorff and Joki Freund, who also wrote instrumental compositions. Although Hipp's music was heavily influenced by American role models, she impressed the American jazz critics with her distinctive and independent performances. The peculiarity of her music was an asymmetrical melody in the improvisations, the beginning and end located in unusual places. English New Orleans and traditional jazzbands were fervently welcomed, particularly Ken Colyer, Sonny Morris and Chris Barber. Bands of this type have continued to play in Germany.

Whereas in America, the rhythmically accented and innovative Bebop enjoyed a heyday until the mid-1950s, this music—unlike the Cool Jazz that had also boomed in the 1950s—was a genre German musicians were unaccustomed to. They preferred Cool Jazz, because with its emphasis on brass melodies, and its interaction, as well as the tone, it was softer and slower—less explosive.

Authorities in German Democratic Republic (GDR) were highly skeptical of jazz due to its American roots. Karl Heinz Drechsel was dismissed from his job at the GDR broadcasting organization in 1952 because of his fondness for jazz and was prohibited from organizing jazz broadcasts again until 1958. The founder of the jazz group Leipzig, Reginald Rudorf, held well-attended lectures on jazz, which also explained the culture of the United States. But they were stopped with disruptive actions by the state security organization ("Staatssicherheit"). In 1957, the Dresdner Interessengemeinschaft Jazz (community of jazz interests) was prohibited in connection with the trial of the regime against Rudorf, as a suspected spy.

While the GDR dance orchestras still played a few Swing numbers, it was Modern Jazz, which could not be integrated into the dance combos, that was officially criticized. It was later denounced as "snotnosed Jazz" by Andre Asriel.

In 1956 the clarinettist Rolf Kühn moved to America, gave a guest performance with Caterina Valente in New York and performed with his quartet at the Newport Jazz Festival in 1957. From 1958 to 1962 Kühn played (as the first German musician) with the orchestras of Benny Goodman and as a solo clarinettist with Tommy Dorsey – as replacement for Buddy DeFranco – one and a half years later. In 1962 Rolf Kühn returned to West Germany.

== The 1960s ==
After the Berlin Wall was built in 1961, West and East German jazz musicians were separated.

On West German television, the great American musicians were introduced to audiences during prime time. Around 1960, Western music producers' interest in recording musicians such as Wolfgang Lauth waned, as jazz music no longer seemed to be a good sale. In 1964, Horst Lippmann had noted: "The German record industry neglected all modern German jazz musicians and only occasionally presented records with amateur Dixieland bands in the area. No German record company seems to be prepared for the artistic obligation to publish modern German jazz appropriate as it is the case in the field of symphonic and chamber music." Shortly thereafter, as if this appeal had been heard and had caused a new generation of jazz producers (such as Siegfried Loch, and Hans-Georg Brunner Schwer) to emerge, records by Klaus Doldinger, Albert Mangelsdorff, but also by Attila Zoller or Wolfgang Dauner came onto the market.

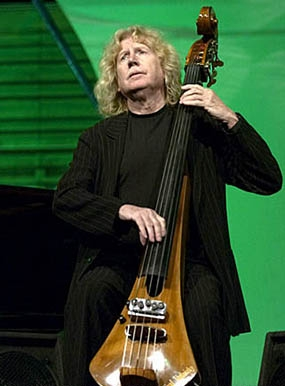
Eberhard Weber

The music critic and producer Joachim-Ernst Berendt took an eminent position at this time, influencing German jazz mainly in the 1960s and 1970s. Without him, neither the European Free Jazz, even as individual musicians like Mangelsdorff, Doldinger and others, would have gained the importance that they have for the German jazz today. Berendt was the first and only global player of the jazz critics and producers of the German jazz scene, who introduced jazz from Germany abroad.

The best-known jazz groups in West Germany were the quintets of Albert Mangelsdorff (with Heinz Sauer and Günter Kronberg), Michael Naura (with Wolfgang Schlüter), and the quartet of Klaus Doldinger (with Ingfried Hoffmann.) Innovators were also the Lauth Wolfgang quartet (with Fritz Hartschuh) and the trio of Wolfgang Dauner (with Eberhard Weber and Fred Braceful). Musically there was a deliberate but careful delineation of the American model. With their growing popularity, Doldinger and Mangelsdorff could also perform abroad and publish records. Naura had to retire from active life as a musician because of illness, and later became an editor of the Jazz part of the NDR (Northern German Broadcast). For the GDR, the Manfred Ludwig sextet has to be mentioned, originally for a long time the only band, which turned to the style of modern jazz.

In 1965, the quintet of Gunter Hampel, a moderate Free Jazz maintainer, with musicians such as Manfred Schoof, Alexander von Schlippenbach, Buschi Niebergall and Pierre Courbois, arrived on the German jazz scene and performed many concerts in the "province". Free jazz, without compromises, could be heard from the Manfred Schoof quintet (Voices) and an octet by Peter Brötzmann (Machine Gun). Especially in the smaller towns of western Germany, jazz music clubs disappeared with the advent of the Beat. From the mid-1960s on, in the GDR, the trio of Joachim Kühn (who migrated to the West in 1966), Friedhelm Schönfeld, and Manfred Schulze found their own ways into free jazz.

== The 1970s ==
The 1970s were marked by the globalization and commercialization of the German jazz world. Jazz was combined with various other music genres. Successful jazz musicians such as Klaus Doldinger, Volker Kriegel and the United Jazz and Rock Ensemble followed this trend in the direction of rock music in West Germany. At the same time, younger musicians like Herbert Joos, Alfred Harth and Theo Jörgensmann garnered public acknowledgment and aroused the attention of the jazz scene with their music. It is noteworthy that the German musicians achieved an acceptance with the local audience on par with American jazz musicians. For example, the Theo Jörgensmann quartet, an avant-garde jazz group, was even in the Best-of Lists of Popular Music in the Music-Yearbook Rock Session. At the same time the German record labels FMP, ECM and ENJA established in the market. Also acoustic-romantic performances by Joachim Kühn and other pianists like Rainer Brüninghaus came into fashion. In Moers and other West German towns, festivals were held that focused on these new developments in jazz.

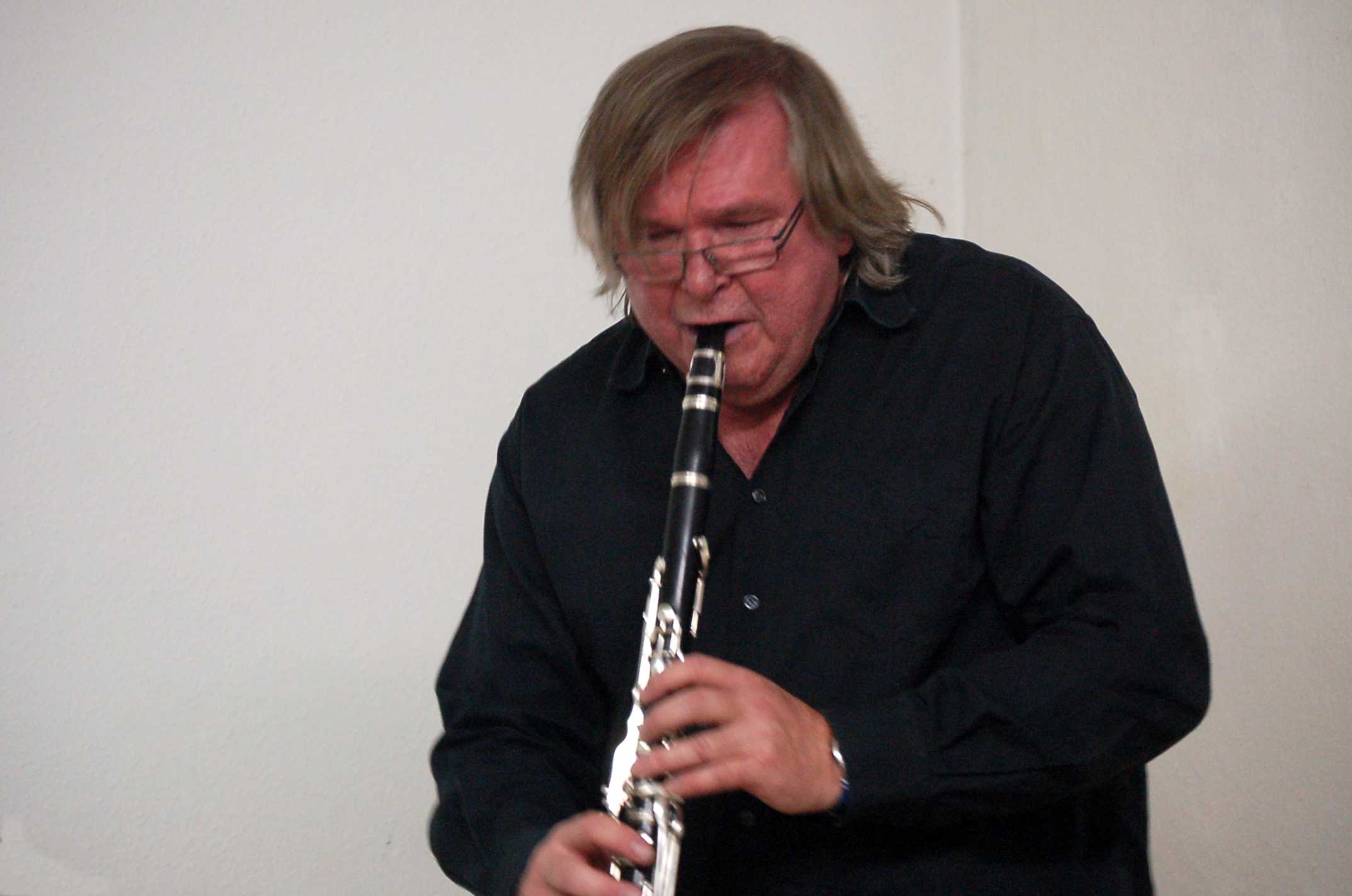
Theo Jörgensmann, 2009

In the 1970s, academic studies of jazz started in West Germany. The annual summer course at the Akademie Remscheid (Remscheid Academy) was very popular among young jazz musicians. There is hardly a professional jazz musician, born between 1940 and 1960, who did not attend this course as a student or teacher.

After 1970, the government ministries of East Germany gave up their antagonism towards jazz music, giving the explanation that jazz had become an integral part of East German culture and politics. Klaus Lenz and the Modern Soul band found its own way to the Fusion of rock and jazz music. In East Germany in particular, free jazz musicians developed their own gestures and improvised first on apparently East German-specific material in such a way that the idea of an "Eisler-Weill Folk-Free jazz" could take hold abroad. The self-assertion was more strongly pronounced in East than in West Germany. Among the better-known artists of this era were Conny Bauer and Ulrich Gumpert (Zentralquartett), as well as Manfred Hering and Günter "Baby" Sommer. This music resonated with a broad young audience, and was very successful. The jazz journalist Bert Noglik noted in retrospect: "In the course of the seventies in the GDR in the evolution of jazz the Free Jazz (in a broader sense) has crystallized to be the form of the major direction of practice and its majority passes, and exists both in quantitative and qualitative respects. This statement refers to the musicians, the audience and also the organizational structure of the concert and tour management. All of this is even more astonishing when one considers that in the eastern and western neighboring regions, there always flowed a relatively strong mainstream music."

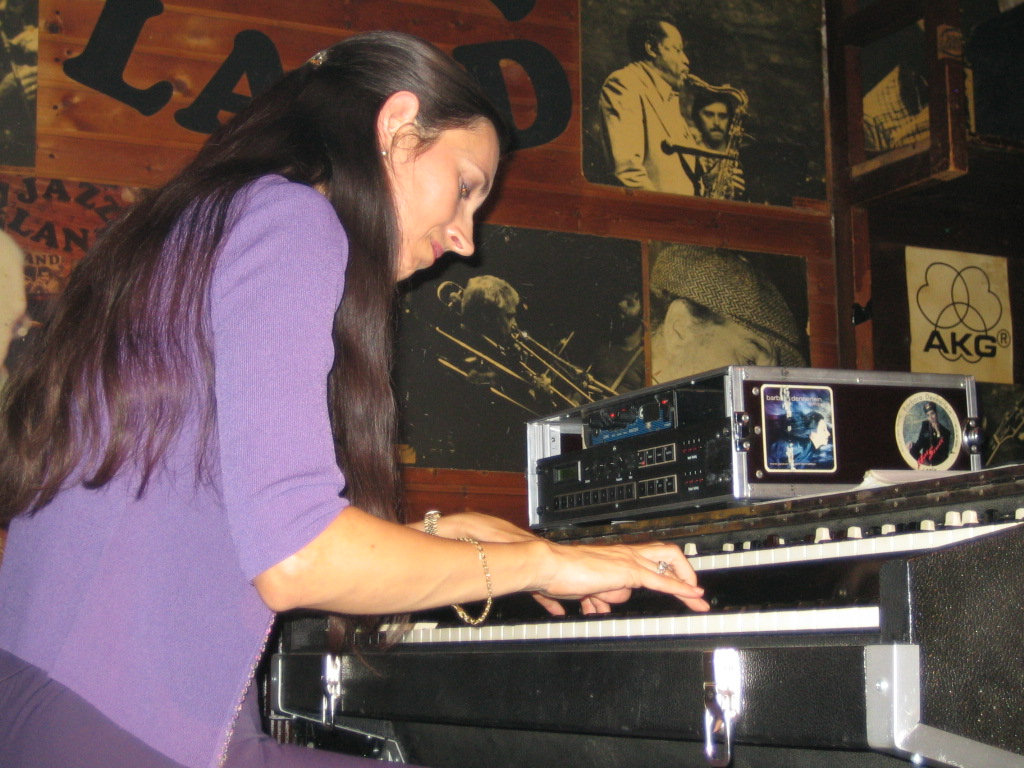
Barbara Dennerlein began her career in the 1980s

== The 1980s ==
In the 1980s, the jazz audience, as well as the jazz scene, split in many different directions in West Germany. There were forms which included traditional repertory, the various currents of free jazz and fusion music, a turning to Neobop, but also style elements that hinted at more modern styles, and neo-classical jazz. In Cologne, there was a strong initiative for Jazz, founding the initiative "Kölner Jazz Haus" (Cologne Jazz House), from which projects such as the Kölner Saxophon Mafia (Cologne Saxophone Mafia) emerged. In Frankfurt, a whole series of guitarists of international significance emerged, among them Torsten de Winkel, who should later appear on the world's stages with the likes of Pat Metheny and Joe Zawinul. And a new interest awakened for the work of Big Bands. Jazz arrangers such as Peter Herbolzheimer raised this genre in Germany to an international level. New venues were opened in mid-sized cities. Due to the large number of different jazz styles, such concerts were poorly attended, especially in the larger cities.

In East Germany, the development was more clearly arranged. In the 1980s, there was a greater exchange between jazz musicians from West and East Germany. If the cooperation took place within the borders of the GDR, normally a non-German musician was also invited to give this event an international complexion. Economically jazz musicians in the GDR lived in comparatively secure or prosperous circumstances, because they worked in an environment of subsidized culture, and unlike their western colleagues did not need to follow the directives of the free market economy. In addition to a comparatively wide Dixieland scene in the area and mainstream American-style jazz, free improvisational music developed in a way that Fred Van Hove (later relativated) spoke misguidedly of the, "Promised Land of Improvised Music".

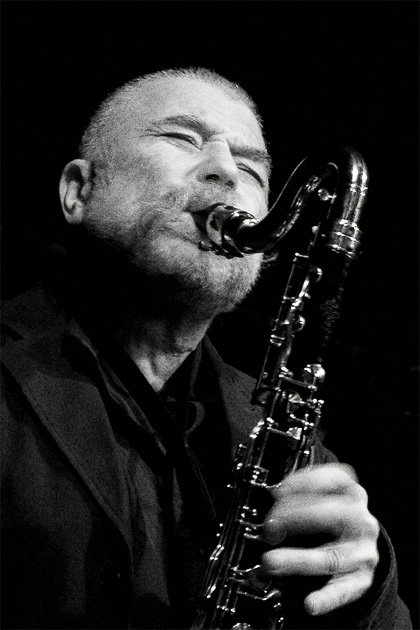
A shot from a 2006 performance by Peter Brötzmann, a key figure and doyen in European free jazz

== The 1990s to the present ==
In 1992, the jazz researcher Ekkehard Jost discerned two basic trends of the jazz scene: one, jazz as a repertoire music and two, jazz in stable and dynamic development. The latter survives through musical practice and is based on the origins of jazz. In the 1990s, even more than in the 1980s, the marketing of music styles dominated the music business, and jazz in particular. Helge Schneider, a well-known entertainer, knew how to integrate jazz into his own comedic art. Another well-known German jazz musician and entertainer is Götz Alsmann, as well as the successful trumpeter Till Brönner. A number of other jazz musicians became established through entertainment-jazz in the scene as well. However, these are not the only musicians who work as jazz musicians sometimes under difficult conditions in Germany, and who are responsible for creating such diverse styles of jazz.

In addition, between East and West Germany, an alignment of styles occurred, much to the detriment of East German jazz culture. Over time, elements of jazz were increasingly integrated with other styles such as hip-hop, later drum 'n' bass and others, most prominently by the internationally successful duo Tab Two. These new styles of fusion were assessed as Acid Jazz or as Nu jazz. Today jazz elements can be found in a great variety of musical styles, such as German Hip-Hop, House, Drum 'n' Bass, dance music, and many others.

Jazz is in low demand on German television. Jazz clubs and other venues still must face the fact that the number of visitors is often difficult to predict and highly variable. Often, younger audiences stay away. Even for tax reasons (so-called "Ausländersteuer" i.e., foreigner tax), the major international musicians, in particular the modern creative musicians, who play in Switzerland, Austria, the Netherlands, Italy and France, increasingly skip Germany on their routes and tours.

Although there are many more jazz musicians in Germany now than in the 1960s and 1970s, it is much easier for the public to form their own individual opinion of the jazz musicians and their music because of electronic media. Traditional opinion makers like public broadcasters' jazz editors are losing influence.

Since the 1990s, Germany's most renowned jazz festival (JazzFest Berlin) has been regularly criticised, and its artistic directors have fallen back on highly elaborate concepts without a clear artistic line being visible.

== Notable jazz events (selection) ==
- JazzFest Berlin
- Deutsches Jazzfestival, Frankfurt
- Total Music Meeting
- Internationales Dixieland Festival Dresden
- Leipziger Jazztage
- Leverkusener Jazztage
- Jazzopen, Stuttgart
- jazzahead! Bremen

Numerous other jazz festivals exist in Germany.

== Literature ==
- Michael H. Kater (1995): Different Drummers: Jazz in the Culture of Nazi Germany. Oxford University Press, ISBN 978-0-19-516553-1 (cited after German translation: Gewagtes Spiel. Jazz im Nationalsozialismus. Köln: Kiepenheuer & Witsch)
- Mike Zwerin (1988): Swing Under the Nazis: Jazz as a Metaphor for Freedom. ISBN 978-0-8154-1075-1
- Dexter, Dave. Jazz Cavalcade: The Inside Story of Jazz. New York: Da Capo Press, 1977.
- Neuhaus, Tom. “No Nazi Party.” History Today 55.11 (2005): 52–57. Academic Search Premier. EBSCO. Web. 24 October 2009.
- Potter, Pamela. “Music in the Third Reich: The Complex Task of ‘Germanization.’” In Jonathan Huener and Francis R. Nicosia (eds), The Arts in Nazi Germany: Continuity, Conformity, Change, Chapter 4. New York: Berghahn Books, 2006.
- WFMU Staff. “Charlie and His Orchestra.” WFMU's Beware of the Blog (accessed October 11, 2009).

=== German books ===
- Wolfram Knauer (1986, Pb.): Jazz in Deutschland. Darmstädter Beiträge zur Jazzforschung 5. Hofheim: Wolke Verlag
- Martin Kunzler (2002): Jazzlexikon: Reinbek
- Rainer Bratfisch (Pb., 2005): Freie Töne: Die Jazzszene der DDR. Berlin: Ch. Links
- Mathias Brüll (2003): Jazz auf AMIGA – Die Jazz-Schallplatten des AMIGA-Labels von 1947 bis 1990. Zusammenstellung von Mathias Brüll. (RMudHwiW / Pro Business Berlin – ISBN 978-3-937343-27-3)
- Rainer Dollase, Michael Rüsenberg, Hans J. Stollenwerk (1978): Das Jazzpublikum: zur Sozialpsychologie einer kulturellen Minderheit. Mainz, London, New York, Tokyo: Schott
- E. Dieter Fränzel/Jazz AGe Wuppertal (Pb.) (2006): Sounds like Whoopataal. Wuppertal in der Welt des Jazz. Essen: Klartext
- Frank Getzuhn (2006): Wandeljahre öffentlicher Lerngeschichte zum Jazz in Deutschland von 1950 – 1960: Lernangebote und Lernen in Zeitschriften und Sachbüchern zum Jazz. Berlin: wvb Wiss. Verl.
- Bernfried Höhne (1991): Jazz in der DDR: Eine Retrospektive. Frankfurt am Main: Eisenbletter und Naumann
- Ekkehard Jost (1987): Europas Jazz: 1960–1980. Frankfurt a.M.: Fischer paperback
- Horst H. Lange (1996): Jazz in Deutschland: Die deutsche Jazz-Chronik bis 1960. Hildesheim; Zürich; New York: Olms-Presse (2. run)
- Martin Lücke (2004): Jazz im Totalitarismus: Eine komparative Analyse des politisch motivierten Umgangs mit dem Jazz während der Zeit des Nationalsozialismus und des Stalinismus. Münster: Lit
- Rainer Michalke (Hg., 2004): Musik life – Die Spielstätten für Jazz und Aktuelle Musik in Nordrhein-Westfalen. Essen: Klartext Verlag
- Bert Noglik (1978): Jazz im Gespräch. Berlin (DDR): Verlag Neue Musik, ders. (1992): Swinging DäDäRä. Die Zeit, 8. Mai 1992, S. 60
- Bruno Paulot (1993): Albert Mangelsdorff: Gespräche. Waakirchen: Oreos
- Fritz Rau (2005): 50 Jahre Backstage: Erinnerungen eines Konzertveranstalters. Heidelberg: Palmyra
- Werner Josh Sellhorn (2005): Jazz – DDR – Fakten: Interpreten, Diskographien, Fotos, CD. Berlin Neunplus 1
- Fritz Schmücker (1993): Das Jazzkonzertpublikum: das Profil einer kulturellen Minderheit im Zeitvergleich. Münster; Hamburg: Lit
- Werner Schwörer (1990): Jazzszene Frankfurt: eine musiksoziologische Untersuchung zur Situation anfangs der achtziger Jahre. Mainz; London; New York; Tokyo: Schott
- Dita von Szadkowski Auf schwarz-weißen Flügeln Focus Verlag 1983 ISBN 978-3-88349-307-7
- Robert von Zahn (1999): Jazz in Nordrhein-Westfalen seit 1946. Köln: Emons; ders. (1998): Jazz in Köln seit 1945 : Konzertkultur und Kellerkunst. Köln: Emons-Verlag

== German jazz magazines ==
- Jazz Echo
- Jazzpodium
- Jazzthetik
- Jazz thing
- Jazz Zeit
- Jazz Zeitung

== See also ==
- Timeline of jazz education. A Chronology of Jazz Pedagogy
