= Jazz guitar =

Jazz instrument and associated playing style

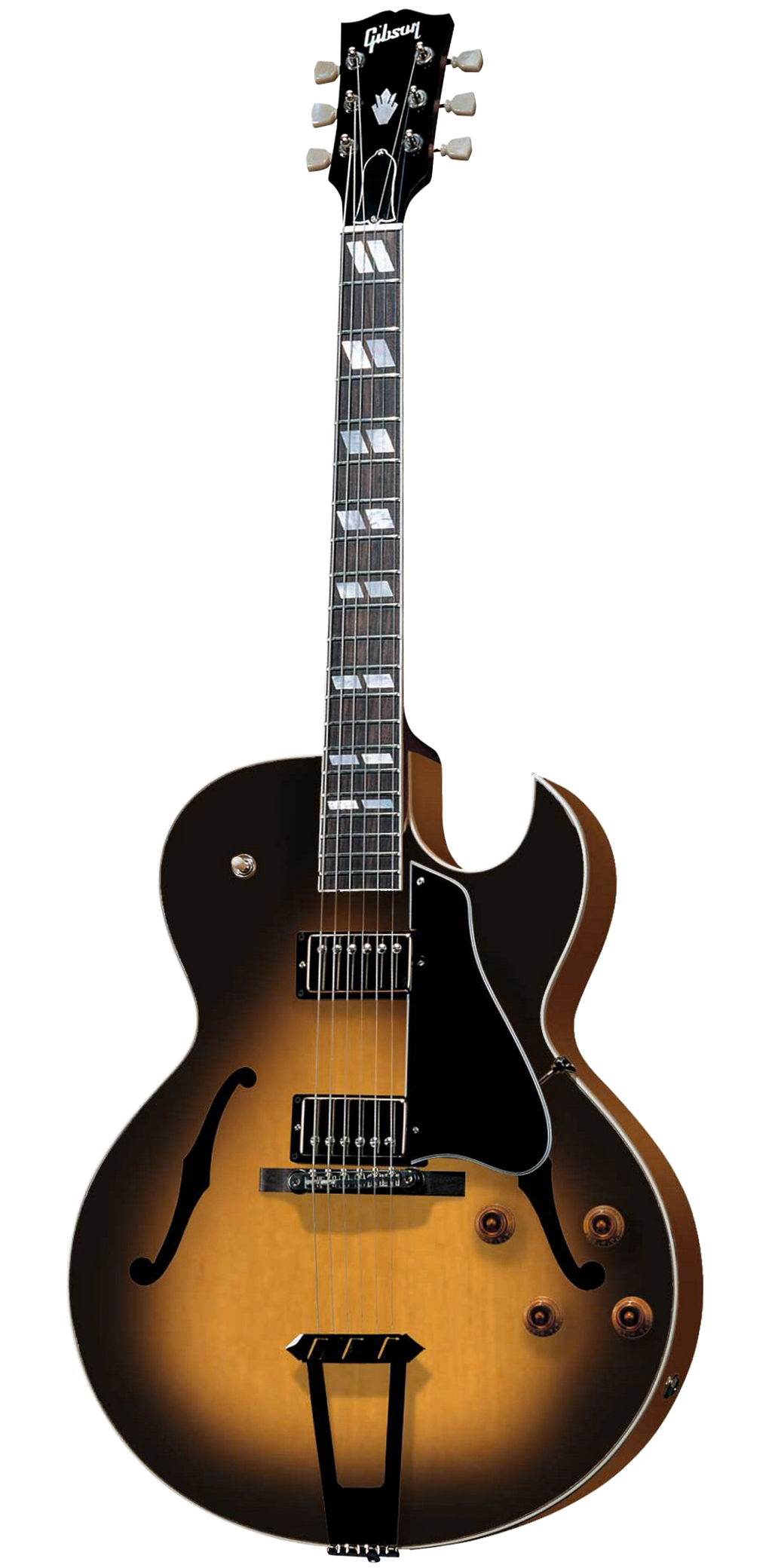
Hollowbody electric guitars are quite common in jazz; the Gibson ES-175 is a classic example. It was in production continuously from 1949 to 2019.

Jazz guitar may refer to either a type of electric guitar or a guitar playing style in jazz, using electric amplification to increase the volume of acoustic guitars.

In the early 1930s, jazz musicians sought to amplify their sound to be heard over loud big bands. When guitarists in big bands switched from acoustic to semi-acoustic guitar and began using amplifiers, it enabled them to play solos. Jazz guitar had an important influence on jazz in the beginning of the twentieth century. Although the earliest guitars used in jazz were acoustic and acoustic guitars are still sometimes used in jazz, most jazz guitarists since the 1940s have performed on an electrically amplified guitar or electric guitar.

Traditionally, jazz electric guitarists use an archtop with a relatively broad hollow sound-box, violin-style f-holes, a "floating bridge", and a magnetic pickup. Solid body guitars, mass-produced since the early 1950s, are also used.

Jazz guitar playing styles include comping with jazz chord voicings (and in some cases walking bass lines) and blowing (improvising) over jazz chord progressions with jazz-style phrasing and ornaments. Comping refers to playing chords underneath a song's melody or another musician's solo improvisations.

From the 1970s onward, fusion-oriented players such as John McLaughlin, Pat Metheny, and Allan Holdsworth significantly expanded the technical and harmonic vocabulary of jazz guitar.

== History ==
=== 1900–mid-1930s ===
The stringed, chord-playing rhythm can be heard in groups which included military band-style instruments such as brass, saxes, clarinets, and drums, such as early jazz groups. As the acoustic guitar became a more popular instrument in the early 20th century, guitar-makers began building louder guitars which would be useful in a wider range of settings. Nick Lucas is regarded as the grandfather of jazz guitar. Two of his guitar compositions recorded in 1922, "Pickin' the Guitar" and "Teasin' the Frets", are considered the first solo jazz guitar recordings. Lucas built the foundations for jazz guitar through his development of various rhythmic, single string, and sweep picking techniques.

The Gibson L5, an acoustic archtop guitar which was first produced in 1923, was an early “jazz”-style guitar which was used by early jazz guitarists such as Eddie Lang. By the 1930s, the guitar began to displace the banjo as the primary chordal rhythm instrument in jazz because the guitar could be used to voice chords of greater harmonic complexity, and it had a somewhat more muted tone that blended well with the upright bass, which, by this time, had almost completely replaced the tuba as the dominant bass instrument in jazz.

=== Late 1930s-1960s ===
During the late 1930s and through the 1940s—the heyday of big band jazz and swing music—the guitar was an important rhythm section instrument. Some guitarists, such as Freddie Green of Count Basie's band, developed a guitar-specific style of accompaniment. Few of the big bands, however, featured amplified guitar solos, which were done instead in the small combo context. The most important jazz guitar soloists of this period included Django Reinhardt, the Manouche virtuoso; Oscar Moore who was featured with Nat “King” Cole's trio and Charlie Christian of Benny Goodman's band and sextet who was a major influence despite his death early in 1942 at the age of 25. Also noteworthy was Mike Danzi who performed with the Alex Hyde Orchestra in the United States as well as with several jazz orchestras throughout Germany during the 1930s.

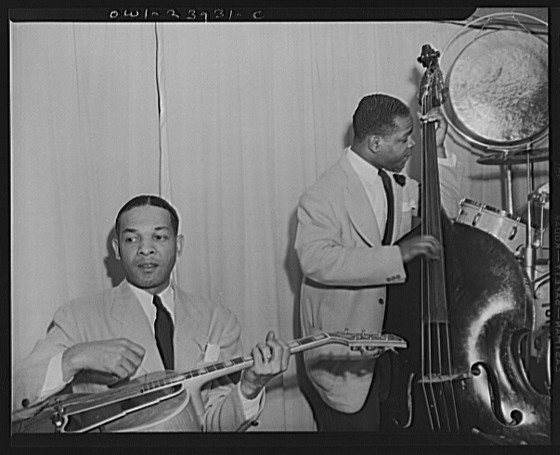
Duke Ellington's big band had a rhythm section that included a jazz guitarist, a double bass player, and a drummer (not visible).

It was not until the large-scale emergence of small combo jazz post-WWII that the guitar took off as a versatile instrument which was used both in the rhythm section and as a featured melodic instrument and solo improviser. In the hands of George Barnes, Billy Bauer, Kenny Burrell, Herb Ellis, Barney Kessel, Jimmy Raney, and Tal Farlow, who had absorbed the language of bebop, the guitar began to be seen as a "serious" jazz instrument. Improved electric guitars such as Gibson's ES-175 (released in 1949), gave players a larger variety of tonal options. In the 1940s through the 1960s, players such as Wes Montgomery, Joe Pass, Al Caiola Tony Mottola and Jim Hall laid the foundation of what is now known as "jazz guitar" playing.

=== 1970s ===
As a result of the ubiquity of the guitar in rock and pop bands during the 1960s, jazz guitarists began to pursue rock-based styles and genres, radically changing the face of jazz guitar and developing the style of "jazz fusion", which broke out of standard jazz idioms and explored rock, funk, and electronic music. As early as 1967, Larry Coryell and his band The Free Spirits recorded Out of Sight and Sound, a groundbreaking album that was one of the earliest examples of rock music being interpreted and played by jazz musicians. More prevalently, Miles Davis featured George Benson as a soloist on the track "Paraphernalia" off of his 1968 album Miles in the Sky, which marked the first example of his long-standing associations with guitarists. Shortly after this, he recruited John McLaughlin to play on In A Silent Way and Bitches Brew, some of the first jazz albums to be called "fusion" and the first serious jazz-rock albums. McLaughlin was a veteran of the British blues scene, and had cut his teeth playing with popular blues and rock groups, such as The Graham Bond Quartet, The Rolling Stones, and Georgie Fame and the Blue Flames. McLaughlin was an avowed fan of Jimi Hendrix, and utilized phrasing closer to that of blues and funk guitarists than stereotypical bebop phrasing, and even had a track off of Bitches Brew named after him. He also played with the Tony Williams Lifetime for two years, before departing, radically altering his approach, and founding a new band. Davis would continue experimenting with guitar-based music during the 1970s, spearheaded by experimental soloist Pete Cosey, and rhythm guitarists Reggie Lucas and, for some time, Dominique Gaumont. Cosey made heavy use of effects, including a synthesizer, as well as 10 string guitars and experimental tunings. His work and influence is recognized by several avant-garde guitarists, such as Television guitarist Tom Verlaine.

The Mahavishnu Orchestra, the resulting band, broke significant ground in both rock and jazz realms, and was headlined by McLaughlin's newer, more experimental style. His guitar playing began to utilize bends, sustain, and distortion common to blues rock musicians, as well as a vocabulary heavily influenced by Hindustani and Carnatic styles of Indian classical music which had become popular in psychedelic rock. His distorted tones and virtuosity earned him and his band fame, and he became a dominant force in jazz guitar. Inspired by him, pianist Chick Corea reorganized his Latin jazz band Return to Forever into a guitar-led rock band, first with blues-based guitarist Bill Connors, then with young virtuoso Al Di Meola. Di Meola would also accrue much respect as a soloist, and influenced numerous rock and jazz guitarists after his time.

Many rock guitarists also began to utilize jazz vocabulary and jazz-based ideas, reflective of progressive rock's convergent evolution with fusion jazz. Yes guitarists Peter Banks and Steve Howe had styles akin to that of many jazz guitarists early on, and helped define Yes's sound apart from other bands. John Goodsall, guitarist for the seminal jazz-rock band Brand X, utilized a fusion guitar style in the context of a progressive rock sound. Most notably, though, was Allan Holdsworth, who played with numerous progressive rock groups and musicians (Soft Machine, Gong, Tempest, Bill Bruford, U.K.) before embarking on a decades-long solo career that saw him become of the most revered soloists in the guitar world. Rather than utilizing standard picking, Holdsworth relied on legato phrasing inspired by horn players like John Coltrane and wildly unique and extremely advanced harmonic ideas. Despite being an "underground" musician and getting very little commercial success, Holdsworth inspired several guitarists over the years, most particularly, Eddie Van Halen.

=== 1980s–2000s ===
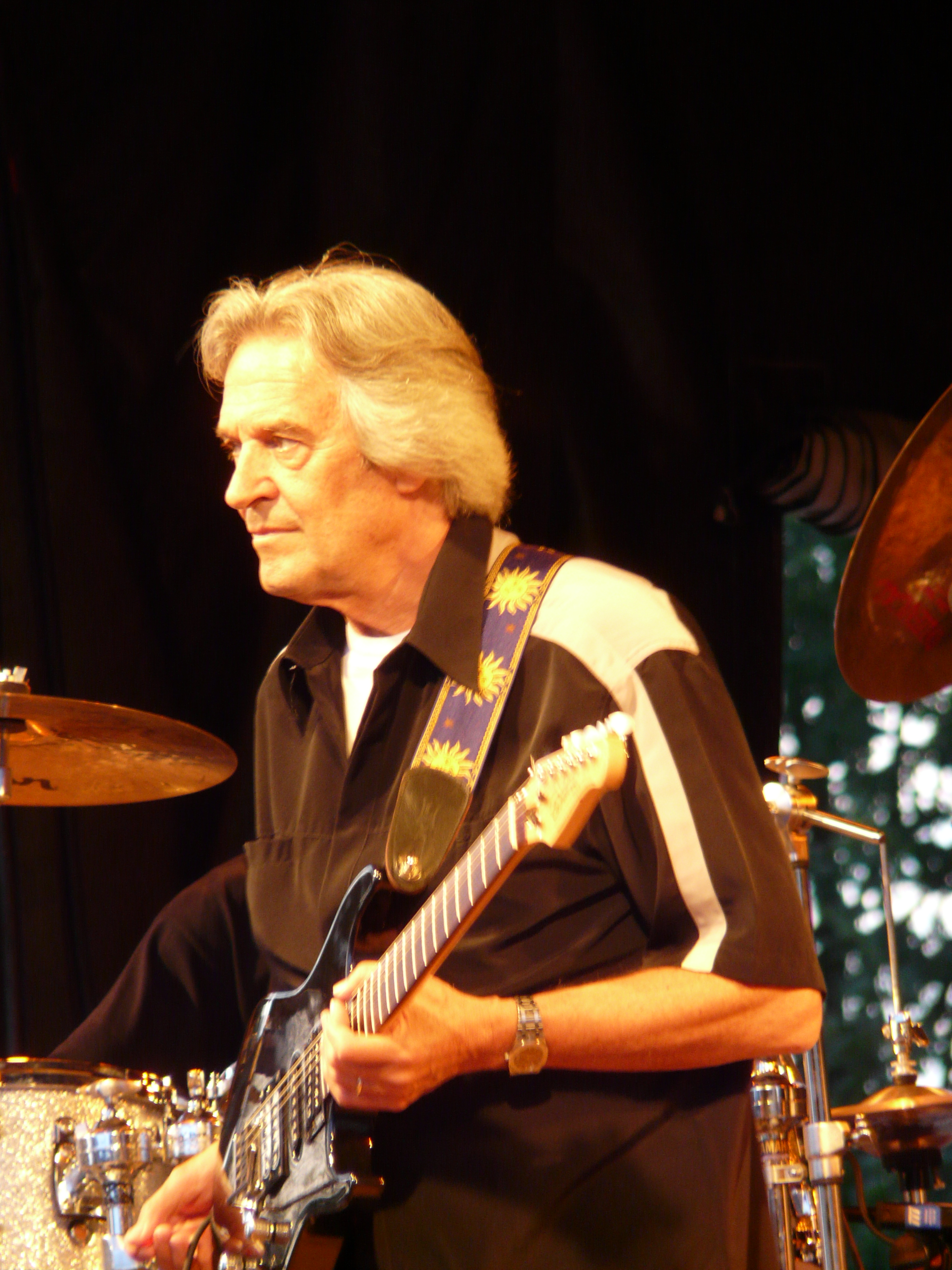
Jazz fusion pioneer John McLaughlin at a festival in Limburgerhof, Germany, 2008

By the early 1980s, the radical experiments of early 1970s-era fusion gave way to a more radio-friendly sounds of smooth jazz. Guitarist Pat Metheny mixed the sounds of rock, blues, country, and “world” music, while still maintaining a strong foundation in bebop and cool jazz, playing both a flat-top acoustic guitar and an electric guitar with a softer, more mellow tone which was sweetened with a shimmering effect known as “chorusing". During the 1980s, a neo-traditional school of jazz sought to reconnect with the past. In keeping with such an aesthetic, young guitarists of this era sought a clean and round tone, and they often played traditional hollow-body arch-top guitars without electronic effects, frequently through vacuum tube amplifiers.

As players such as Bobby Broom, Peter Bernstein, Howard Alden, Russell Malone, and Mark Whitfield revived the sounds of traditional jazz guitar, there was also a resurgence of archtop luthierie (guitar-making). By the early 1990s many small independent luthiers began making archtop guitars. In the 2000s, jazz guitar playing continues to change. Some guitarists incorporate a Latin jazz influence, acid jazz-style dance club music uses samples from Wes Montgomery, and guitarists such as Bill Frisell continue to defy categorization.

== Types of guitars ==
=== Archtop guitars ===
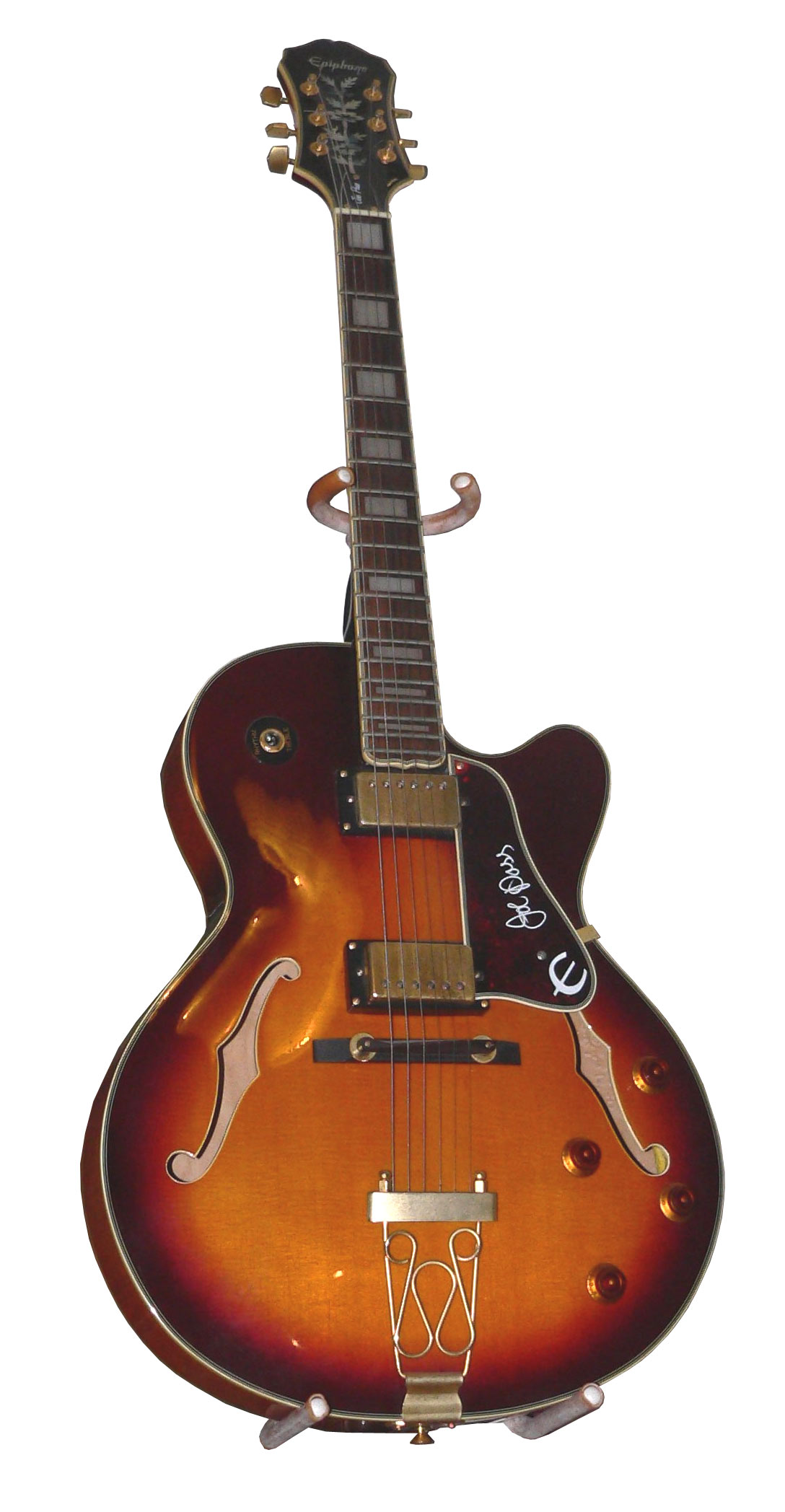
A hollow-bodied Epiphone guitar with violin-style "F" holes.

While jazz can be played on any type of guitar, from an acoustic instrument to a solid-bodied electric guitar such as a Fender Stratocaster, the full-depth archtop guitar has become known as the prototypical "jazz guitar." Archtop guitars are steel-string acoustic guitars with a big soundbox, arched top, violin-style f-holes, a "floating bridge" and magnetic or piezoelectric pickups. Early makers of jazz guitars included Gibson, Epiphone, D'Angelico and Stromberg. The electric guitar is plugged into a guitar amplifier to make it sound loud enough for performance. Guitar amplifiers have equalizer controls that allow the guitarist to change the tone of the instrument, by emphasizing or de-emphasizing certain frequency bands. The use of reverb effects, often included in guitar amplifiers, has long been part of the jazz guitar sound. Particularly since the 1970s jazz fusion era, some jazz guitarists have also used effects pedals such as overdrive pedals, chorus pedals and wah pedals.

The earliest guitars used in jazz were acoustic, later superseded by electric guitars using single-coil (typically Gibson P90s) pickups, then morphing into a typical electric configuration of two humbucking pickups. In the 1990s, there was a resurgence of interest among jazz guitarists in acoustic archtop guitars with floating pickups. The original acoustic archtop guitars were designed to enhance volume: for that reason they were constructed for use with relatively heavy guitar strings. Even after electrification became the norm, jazz guitarists continued to fit strings of 0.012" gauge or heavier to carry on the tradition, and also prefer flatwound strings. The characteristic arched top can be made of a solid piece of wood that is carved into the arched shape, or a piece of laminated wood (essentially a type of plywood) that is pressed into shape. Spruce is often used for tops, and maple for backs. Archtop guitars can be mass-produced, such as the Ibanez Artcore series, or handmade by luthiers such as Robert Benedetto.

=== Other guitars ===
- The Selmer-Maccaferri guitar is strongly associated with Django Reinhardt and gypsy swing.
- The resonator guitar was used (but not exclusively) by Oscar Aleman.
- Nylon string guitars are associated with Latin jazz, for instance in the work of Charlie Byrd and Laurindo Almeida.
- Flat-top steel-string guitars (particularly Ovation guitars) have been used in the "acoustic shredding" of John McLaughlin, Larry Coryell and Al Di Meola.
- Solid-body electric guitars have been used in jazz-rock, for instance by Bill Frisell and Stanley Jordan. The Telecaster in particular has a jazz following, e.g. Ed Bickert and Ted Greene.
- Synthesizer guitars in jazz-rock and avant-garde jazz, e.g. by Allan Holdsworth and Pat Metheny.
- Seven string guitars by George van Eps, Lenny Breau, Bucky Pizzarelli and Howard Alden.
- Eight-string guitars by Ralph Patt.

== Musical elements ==
=== Rhythm ===
Jazz rhythm guitar often consists of very textural, odd-meter playing that includes generous use of exotic, difficult-to-fret chords. In 4/4 timing, it is common to play 2.5 beat intervals such as on the 2 and then the half beat or "and" after 4. Jazz guitarists may play chords "ahead" of the beat, by playing the chord a swung eighth note before the actual chord change. Chords are not generally played in a repetitive rhythmic fashion, like a rock rhythm guitarist would play.

=== Harmony ===
Jazz guitarists use their knowledge of harmony and jazz theory to create jazz chord "voicings," which emphasize the 3rd and 7th notes of the chord. Some more sophisticated chord voicings also include the 9th, 11th, and 13th notes of the chord. In some modern jazz styles, dominant 7th chords in a tune may contain altered 9ths (either flattened by a semitone, which is called a "flat 9th", or sharpened by a semitone, which is called a "sharp 9th"); 11ths (sharpened by a semitone, which is called a "sharp 11th"); 13ths (typically flattened by a semitone, which is called a "flat 13th").

Jazz guitarists need to learn about a range of different chords, including major 7th, major 6th, minor 7th, minor/major 7th, dominant 7th, diminished, half-diminished, and augmented chords. As well, they need to learn about chord transformations (e.g., altered chords, such as "alt dominant chords" described above), chord substitutions, and re-harmonization techniques. Some jazz guitarists use their knowledge of jazz scales and chords to provide a walking bass-style accompaniment.

Jazz guitarists learn to perform these chords over the range of different chord progressions used in jazz, such as the ubiquitous ii-V-I progression, the jazz-style blues progression (which, in contrast to a blues-style 12 bar progression, may have two or more chord changes per bar) the minor jazz-style blues form, the I-vi-ii-V based "rhythm changes" progression, and the variety of modulation-rich chord progressions used in jazz ballads, and jazz standards. Guitarists may also learn to use the chord types, strumming styles, and effects pedals (e.g., chorus effect or fuzzbox) used in 1970s-era jazz-Latin, jazz-funk, and jazz-rock fusion music.

=== Melody ===
Jazz guitarists integrate the basic building blocks of scales and arpeggio patterns into balanced rhythmic and melodic phrases that make up a cohesive solo. Jazz guitarists often try to imbue their melodic phrasing with the sense of natural breathing and legato phrasing used by horn players such as saxophone players. As well, a jazz guitarists' solo improvisations have to have a rhythmic drive and "timefeel" that creates a sense of "swing" and "groove." The most experienced jazz guitarists learn to play with different "timefeels" such as playing "ahead of the beat" or "behind the beat," to create or release tension.

Another aspect of the jazz guitar style is the use of stylistically appropriate ornaments, such as grace notes, slides, and muted notes. Each subgenre or era of jazz has different ornaments that are part of the style of that subgenre or era. Jazz guitarists usually learn the appropriate ornamenting styles by listening to prominent recordings from a given style or jazz era. Some jazz guitarists also borrow ornamentation techniques from other jazz instruments, such as Wes Montgomery's borrowing of playing melodies in parallel octaves, which is a jazz piano technique. Jazz guitarists also have to learn how to add in passing tones, use "guide tones" and chord tones from the chord progression to structure their improvisations.

In the 1970s and 1980s, with jazz-rock fusion guitar playing, jazz guitarists incorporated rock guitar soloing approaches, such as riff-based soloing and usage of pentatonic and blues scale patterns. Some guitarists used Jimi Hendrix-influenced distortion and wah-wah effects to get a sustained, heavy tone, or even used rapid-fire guitar shredding techniques, such as tapping and tremolo bar bending. Guitarist Al Di Meola, who started his career with Return to Forever in 1974, was one of the first guitarists to perform in a "shred" style, a technique later used in rock and heavy metal playing. Di Meola used alternate-picking to perform very rapid sequences of notes in his solos.

=== Improvisation ===
When jazz guitar players improvise, they use the scales, modes, and arpeggios associated with the chords in a tune's chord progression. The approach to improvising has changed since the earliest eras of jazz guitar. During the Swing era, many soloists improvised "by ear" by embellishing the melody with ornaments and passing notes. However, during the bebop era, the rapid tempo and complicated chord progressions made it increasingly harder to play "by ear." Along with other improvisers, such as saxes and piano players, bebop-era jazz guitarists began to improvise over the chord changes using scales (whole tone scale, chromatic scale, etc.) and arpeggios. Jazz guitar players tend to improvise around chord/scale relationships, rather than reworking the melody, possibly due to their familiarity with chords resulting from their comping role. A source of melodic ideas for improvisation is transcribing improvised solos from recordings. This provides jazz guitarists with a source of "licks", melodic phrases and ideas they incorporate either intact or in variations, and is an established way of learning from the previous generations of players.

== Playing styles ==
=== Big band rhythm ===
In jazz big bands, popular during the 1930s and 1940s, the guitarist is considered an integral part of the rhythm section (guitar, drums and bass). They usually played a regular four strums to the bar, although an amount of harmonic improvisation is possible. Freddie Green, guitarist in the Count Basie orchestra, was a noted exponent of this style. The harmonies are often minimal; for instance, the root note is often omitted on the assumption that it will be supplied by the bassist.

=== Small group comping ===
When jazz guitarists play chords underneath a song's melody or another musician's solo improvisations, it is called "comping", short for "accompanying". The accompanying style in most jazz styles differs from the way chordal instruments accompany in many popular styles of music. In many popular styles of music, such as rock and pop, the rhythm guitarist usually performs the chords in rhythmic fashion which sets out the beat or groove of a tune. In contrast, in many modern jazz styles within smaller groups, the guitarist plays much more sparsely, intermingling periodic chords and delicate voicings into pauses in the melody or solo, and using periods of silence. Jazz guitarists commonly use a wide variety of inversions when comping, rather than only using standard voicings.

=== Chord-melody and unaccompanied soloing ===
In this style, the guitarist aims to render an entire song — harmony, melody and bass — in something like the way a classical guitarist or pianist can. Chord roots cannot be left to the bassist in this style. Chords themselves can be used sparsely or more densely, depending on both the individual player and his or her arrangement of a particular piece. In the sparse style, a full chord is often played only at the beginning of a melodic phrase. The denser chordal textures, in contrast, approach chord soloing (see below). A third approach is to maintain a steady, busy bass-line, like a New Orleans pianist. Here, no more than two or three notes are played at a time, and the full harmony is indicated by arpeggiation. Exponents of this style often come from a country, folk or ragtime background, such as Chet Atkins, although it is also sometimes employed by straight-ahead jazz practitioners, for instance Martin Taylor. Chord-melody is often played with a plectrum (see Tal Farlow, George Benson and others); whereas fingerstyle, as practised by Joe Pass, George van Eps, Ted Greene, Robert Conti, Lenny Breau or hybrid picking as practised by Ed Bickert, Laszlo Sirsom and others allows for a more complex, polyphonic approach to unaccompanied soloing.

=== "Blowing" or single-note soloing ===
Eddie Lang and Lonnie Johnson were two of the earliest practitioners of single note improvised solos. Both played with Louis Armstrong and other leading jazz and blues musicians of the 1920s and 1930s. In later years Charlie Christian and Django Reinhardt, the former on electric guitar and the latter playing forcefully on an acoustic guitar, are acknowledged as the first soloists to put jazz guitar improvisation on an equal footing with that of other instruments. Over the years, jazz guitarists have been able to solo in standard jazz idioms, such as bebop, cool jazz and so on, while in also absorbing influences from rock guitarists, such as the use of electronic effects.

=== Chord soloing ===
Jazz guitarists are not limited to single note improvisation. When working with accompaniment, chord solos are created by improvising chords (harmony) and melody simultaneously, usually in the upper register on strings 1,2,3 and 4. Wes Montgomery was noted for playing successive choruses in single notes, then octaves and finally a chord solo - this can be heard in his improvisation on the standard Lover Man (Oh, Where Can You Be?). When playing without accompaniment, jazz guitarists may create chord solos by playing bass, melody and chords, individually or simultaneously, on any or all strings - such as the work of Lenny Breau, Joe Pass, Martin Taylor and others. This technique can also be incorporated into unaccompanied soloing: for instance Django Reinhardt's "improvisations", as he called his solo pieces.

== See also ==
- List of jazz guitarists
- Jazz guitarists
- Swing (jazz performance style)
- Jazz bass
