= Berlin Villa d'Este =

The Berlin Villa d'Este was a restaurant and dance cafe on Hardenbergstrasse in the Charlottenburg district of Berlin, Germany, in the late 1920s and early 1930s.

== Building ==
The small neo-baroque palace at Hardenbergstrasse 21–23 was built in 1889.

Located near the Berlin Zoologischer Garten railway station (where the Amerika Haus Berlin is now located), it was the ostentatious residence of its bourgeois owners (Wilhelm and Anna Koch). After the death of the owner's family, it initially served film and stage actors (Bühne und Film e.V.) as their elegant club. Then it was converted for gastronomical use and received the name "Villa d'Este", probably as a reference to the deluxe hotel Villa d'Este at Lake Como in Italy.

== History ==
In the Roaring Twenties, "Dance and pleasure" was the motto of a portion of Berlin society. Nightclubs, bars, cabarets, and variety theatres were very popular. In particular, Hardenbergstrasse developed – in addition to Friedrichstrasse – as a most popular nightlife area.

== Restaurant and dance cafe ==
In June 1927, the luxurious restaurant and dance cafe Villa d'Este, opened at Hardenbergstrasse 21–23.

"Attention deserves the elegant and very beautiful restaurant Villa d'Este in the Hardenbergstrasse, in a small villa" wrote the journalist Eugen Szatmari in his guidebook "Was nicht im Baedeker steht".

In addition to the restaurant and bar, the establishment offered a grand garden on the rear side of the house, where guests could sit under the trees and dance on a dance floor (the so-called "Tanzspirale") throughout the night. Famous musicians and bands, such as Mike Danzi, Paul Godwin, René Dumont, Dajos Béla, Harry Revel and Bernhard Barenblatt played for an "audience who have the necessary wherewithal", according to the Berlin Journalist Adolf Stein alias "Rumpelstilzchen" on the occasion of the opening of the restaurant.

== Changes of owner and name ==
The Wall Street crash of 1929 (Black Thursday) and the Great Depression that followed, plus the pressure of competition between the entertainment bars, rapidly downgraded the economic situation of many gastronomic companies.

In 1929, the "Villa d’Este" had already passed into the hands of Jewish restaurateur, Josef König, and renamed as "Cafe König am Zoo – Villa d’Este". Possibly, as a prediction of the upcoming threat of the political situation, König sold his ownership of the "Villa d’Este", in the spring of 1932. The new owner, Ludwig Konecny, renamed the restaurant as "Kaffee Aquarium". But from the viewpoint of Berlin society, the building continued to be known as "Villa d’Este". Konecny, also owner of the Berlin transvestite club "Eldorado", fled to czechia in mid 1933. From there he authorized a managing director to manage the business. But with the rise of National Socialism, the restaurant and coffee house business had become difficult. Finally, bankruptcy proceedings were opened for the Villa d'Este in May 1936.

At the end of the 1930s, the National Socialist "Ausstellungsleitung e.V.“ (Nazis), moved into the location.
