= Marek Weber =

German musician

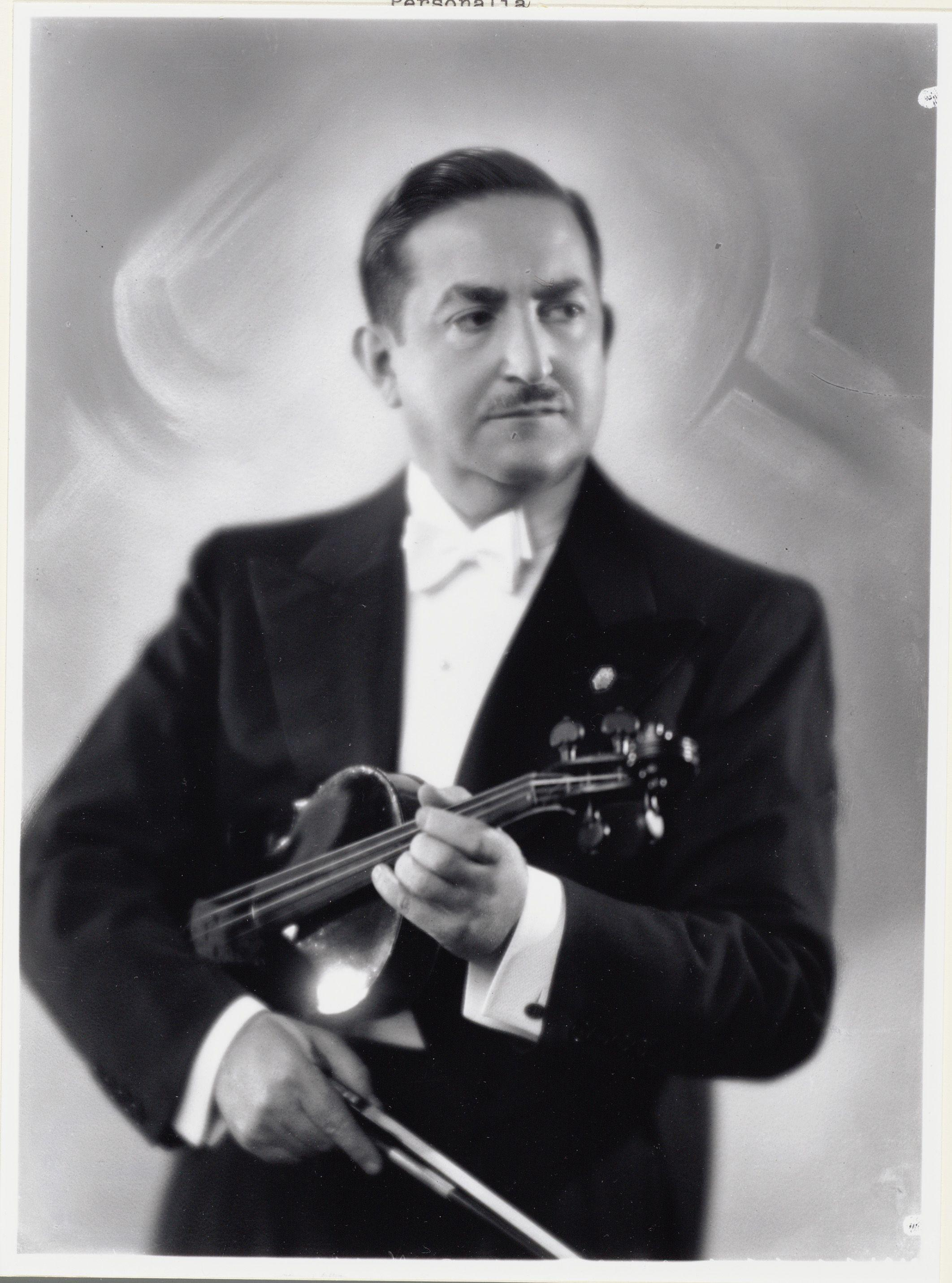
Weber in 1934

Marek Weber (25 October 1888 – 9 February 1964) was an Austrian violinist and bandleader.

== Early life and education ==
Born in Lviv (then part of the Austro-Hungarian Empire), Weber moved in 1906 to Berlin and studied at the Stern Conservatory.

== Career ==
Marek Weber Orchestra Polygoon Film (Amsterdam, 1930)

At the age of twenty he founded his own orchestra. In 1923 he became resident bandleader at the prestigious Hotel Adlon. Beginning in the early 1920s he and his orchestra began to make recordings, first for the Carl Lindström Company (under the "Parlophon" label), and later for Deutsche Grammophon. In 1926 he moved to the newly formed Electrola, and remained with this label for the remainder of his career in Germany. During this period he was one of the foremost recording artists in Germany, on a par with Paul Godwin, Efim Schachmeister, Ben Berlin and Dajos Béla. Beginning in 1930 Weber occasionally scored films, but he remained chiefly associated with the nightlife of Berlin.

Weber's musical tastes were conservative, and during the early years his orchestra was known for playing Viennese waltzes, two-steps, and other subdued styles. He detested jazz and its anarchic tendencies. However, as a bandleader he had no choice but to incorporate modern styles into his program, and occasionally yield the floor to jazz solos and improvisational riffs, albeit under protest. Whenever his band launched into a jazz interlude, he would pointedly depart the conductor's podium and get a drink at the bar. Despite his personal distaste for the new style, his band included some of the strongest jazz talent in Germany, notably the trumpeters Arthur Briggs and Rolf Goldstein, the pianist Martin Roman, and the banjo player Mike Danzi. The Dutch clarinetist and saxophonist Hans Mossel (Amsterdam, 1905 - Auschwitz, 1944) was employed by Weber in 1931. His singers included Leo Monosson and Austin Egen.

As a prominent German Jew, Weber was among those musicians targeted by the Reichsmusikkammer. Beginning in 1933 his compositions were labeled degenerate music. In late 1932 he left Germany and, traveling via London and Zürich, settled in the United States in 1937. Billed as the "Radio Waltz King", he became a fixture of the NBC Red Network, with star billing on the Carnation Condensed Milk program and frequent guest appearances on other shows.

== Later life ==
Weber became a citizen of the United States on February 5, 1943, in naturalization proceedings in Chicago.

After the Second World War he purchased a ranch and retired from show business. He bequeathed his personal collection of violins to the Indiana University School of Music. He died in Chicago at the age of seventy-five. After his death, his widow Anna established a scholarship in his name for one male and one female violinist.

== Photograph and two original recordings of Marek Weber ==
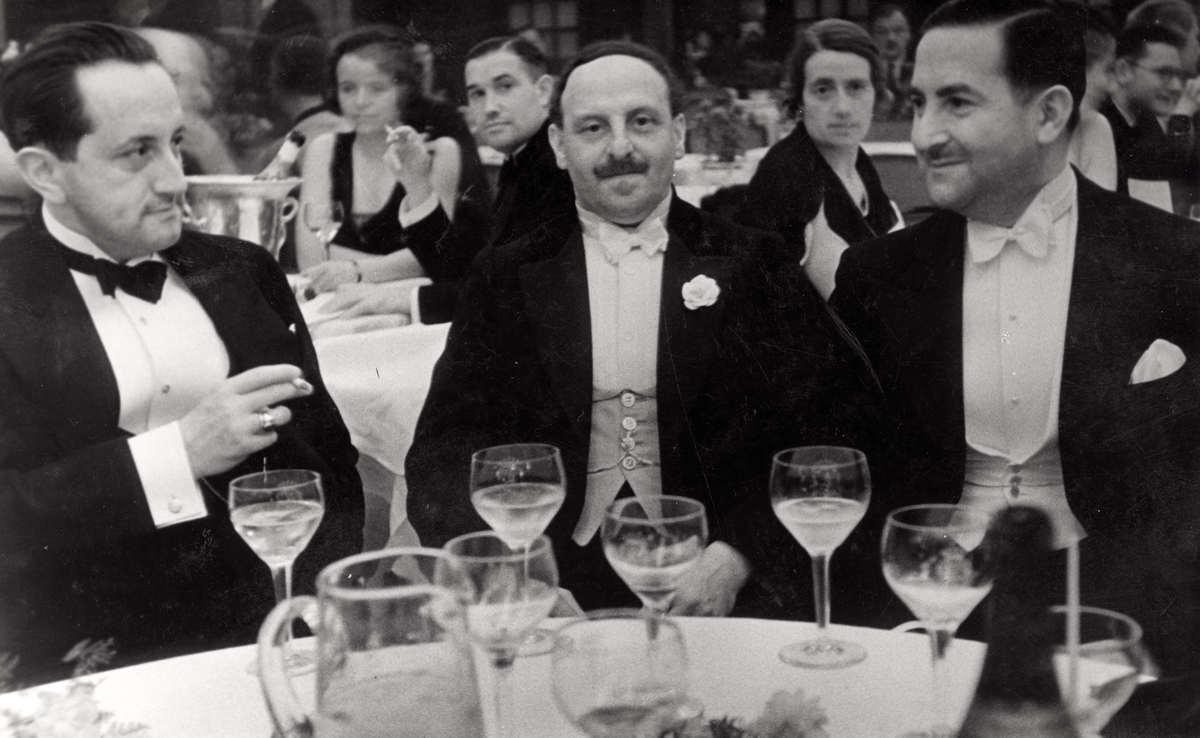
From left to right Rudolf Mengelberg, Gerrit van Weezel and Marek Weber, 1932.

Marek Weber and his orchestra - Liebestraum No. 3 - Franz Liszt.

Marek Weber and his orchestra - Das Dreimäderlhaus - Part 1 - Franz Schubert
