= Portnov =

Portnov (feminine: Portnova; Russian: Портнов, Портнова) is a Russian-language occupational surname derived from the occupation of portnoy, "tailor" and literally meaning "<child> of the tailor". Sometimes written as Portnoff or Portnow.

The surname may refer to:

- Aleksandr Portnov, Soviet Olympic diver
- Andrii Portnov (born 1979), Ukrainian historian, essayist, and editor
- Andriy Portnov (1973–2025), Ukrainian lawyer and politician
- Zinaida Portnova, hero of the Soviet Union
- Larion Portnov, a mayor of Odesa, Ukraine
