= Villa d'Este (disambiguation) =

Villa d'Este is a 16th-century villa in Tivoli, near Rome, Italy

Villa d'Este may also refer to:

- Villa d'Este, Cernobbio, a Renaissance patrician residence in Cernobbio on the shores of Lake Como, northern Italy, now a deluxe hotel
- Villa d'Este, Johannesburg, a National Heritage site in Johannesburg, Gauteng, South Africa
- Berlin Villa d'Este, a former 1920s restaurant and dance cafe in the Charlottenburg district of Berlin, Germany

== See also ==
- Palazzina Marfisa d'Este, a Renaissance-style palace, sometimes referred to as a villa, located east of Central Ferrara, Emilia-Romagna, Italy
- Concorso d'Eleganza Villa d'Este, an event for classic and vintage cars, held near the Villa d'Este, Cernobbio, northern Italy
