= Portnoff =

Portnoff is a surname, a spelling variant of Portnov. Notable people with the surname include:

- Leo Portnoff (1875–1940), Ukrainian musician, teacher, and composer
- Mischa Portnoff (1901–1979), German-born American composer and teacher
- Morrie Portnoff, Canadian astronomer, the namesake of 10333 Portnoff, main-belt asteroid
