= Paul O'Montis =

Paul O’Montis (April 3 1894 – July 17 1940) was a German singer, parodist, and cabaret artist.

== Life and work ==
Paul O'Montis, born Paul Wendel, grew up in Hanover and moved to Berlin in 1924, where he gained his first theater experience on various cabaret stages. In 1926, his performance in Friedrich Hollaender's revue Laterna Magica brought him his first recognition in the press. His first record was released in 1927 by Odeon, accompanied by violinist Dajos Béla and his dance orchestra. He recorded a total of 70 tracks with Odeon, though not all were published. In 1929, he switched to Deutsche Grammophon, where he was accompanied by Paul Godwin and his orchestra. Mischa Spoliansky also accompanied him on piano.

He specialized in sophisticated and caricatured couplets, with a focus on comedic and nonsensical songs characterized by wordplay and double meanings. His openly lived homosexuality also influenced some of his works and interpretations.

The cabaret critic Max Herrmann-Neiße wrote: “Paul O'Montis has the technique to perform even the most banal popular chansons in a way that makes them enjoyable for a more discerning audience, as he humorously parodies them from the outset.” He performed on many famous Berlin cabaret stages, such as Café Meran, Boulevard-Theater, Florida, Simpl, Scala, and Wintergarten. He also appeared at the Corso-Kabarett in Hanover and the Trichter in Hamburg. Additionally, he performed on radio.

After the Nazis came to power in 1933, he fled to Vienna at the end of that year, performing in Austria, the Netherlands, and Switzerland. In 1935, he was banned from performing in Germany. Following the annexation of Austria in 1938, he fled to Prague. There, he was arrested in 1939 and transported first to Zagreb and later to Łódź. The reasons for his arrest and the extensive relocation remain unclear. On May 30, 1940, he was sent to the Sachsenhausen concentration camp as a prisoner marked with the pink triangle. He died there six weeks later at the age of 46. The camp administration’s report claims “suicide,” but other testimonies contradict this, stating that Paul O'Montis was murdered by the block elder.

His grave is located in a communal burial site at the municipal cemetery Altglienicke.
