= Marie Goetze =

German contralto

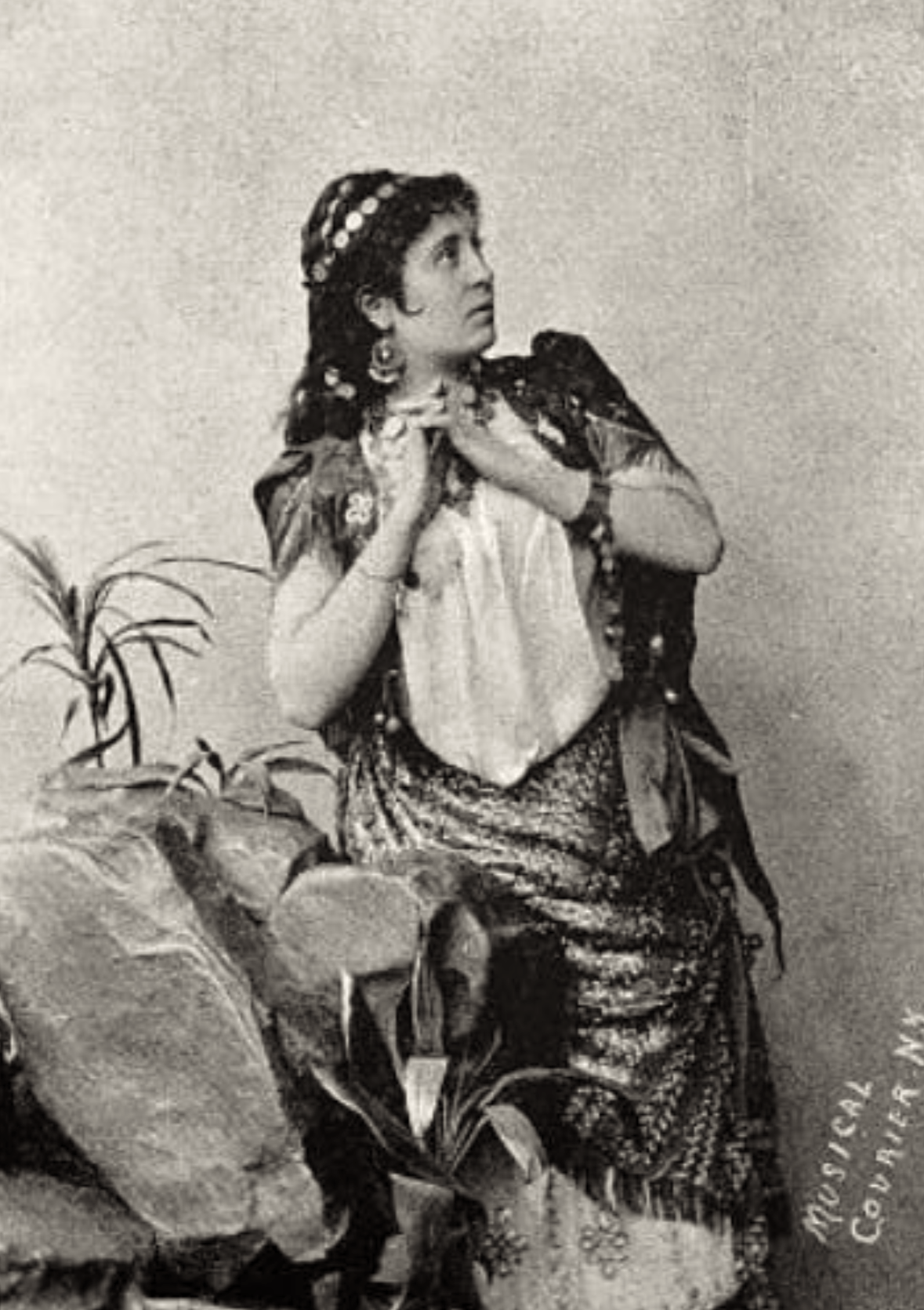
Photograph from the Musical Courier identifying Marie Ritter-Götze while she was a singer at the Metropolitan Opera.

Marie Goetze, sometimes given as Marie Götz or Marie Götze and also known by her married name Marie Ritter-Goetze (also styled Marie Ritter-Götze), (2 November 1865 – 18 December 1922) was a German contralto. A native of Berlin, she was trained by Jenny Meyer at the Stern Conservatory and privately with Désirée Artôt. She was a longtime principal artist at the Berlin Hofoper 1884-1886 and again from 1892 until her retirement from the stage in 1920. She also was a resident artist at the Hamburg State Opera (1886-1890) and in New York City at the Metropolitan Opera (1890-1891). She performed as a guest artist at many important theatres; among them the Royal Opera House in London, the Cologne Opera, Oper Frankfurt, and the Bavarian State Opera. She was a lauded interpreter of the role of Fides in Giacomo Meyerbeer's Le Prophète.

== Life and career ==
Born in Berlin on 2 November 1865, Marie Goetze was the daughter of a Royal Prussian civil servant. Her parents opposed her desire to become an opera singer and she began her training relatively late at the age of 19 when parents' unwillingness relented. She was educated in her native city at the Stern Conservatory where studied singing with contralto Jenny Meyer. She then pursued further vocal training with Belgian soprano Désirée Artôt.

Goetze's professional opera debut took place at the Kroll Opera House in Berlin where she performed the part of Azucena in Giuseppe Verdi's Il trovatore in 1884. That same year she became a member of the Berlin Hofoper where she was in residence for two years. She left there in 1886 to join the company of the Hamburg State Opera (HSO) where she was a principal artist through 1890. Her first appearance at the HSO was in the title part of Georges Bizet's Carmen. While in Hamburg she married the baritone Josef Ritter (1859-1911) and was briefly billed under her married name Marie Goetze-Ritter (also given as Marie Ritter-Götze).

In the 1890-1891 season Goetze was member of the Metropolitan Opera ("Met) in New York. She made her debut at the Met on 26 November 1890 as Loretta in the United States premiere of Alberto Franchetti's Asrael. Her other repertoire at the Metropolitan Opera House included Bostana in Der Barbier von Bagdad, Brangäne in Tristan und Isolde, Fides in Le Prophète, Fricka in Das Rheingold and Die Walküre, and Ortrud in Lohengrin. In May 1891 she sang in the inaugural festival that opened the newly built Carnegie Hall; performing the role of the Angel in Mendelssohn's Elijah with the Oratorio Society of New York, soprano Antonie Mielke as The Widow, and bass Emil Fischer singing the title part. She also performed the part of Fides as a guest artist at the Vienna State Opera in 1891. Her other part in Vienna included Amneris in Aida.

In 1892 Goetze returned to the Berlin Hofoper (BH) where she remained until her retirement from the stage in 1920. She participated in the world premieres of several operas in that theatre; among them Felix Weingartner's Genesius, Op. 14 (15 November 1892); Ernst Frank's Hero (26 November 1884); Wilhelm Kienzl's Der Evangelimann (4 May 1895, as Magdalena); Albert Lortzing's Regina (21 March 1899); and Ferdinand Hummel's Die Beichte, op. 69 (1900). In 1902 she starred in the Berlin premiere of Wilhelm Kienzl's Heilmar der Narr, and in 1906 she appeared in the BH's first staging of Richard Strauss's Salome in the role of Herodias. She later performed the part of Clytemnestra in the first performance in Berlin of Strauss's Elektra in 1909. Her repertoire at the BH included several roles in Wagner operas; including Adriano in Rienzi, Brangäne, Magdalene in Die Meistersinger von Nürnberg, and Ortrud. Other roles she performed included Dalila in Samson et Dalila and Frau Reich in The Merry Wives of Windsor.

In 1893 Goetze performed in the premiere of Josef Foerster's Die Rose von Pontevedra at the Ekhof Theatre in Gotha. In May 1896 she performed for the official celebrations in Moscow of the Coronation of Nicholas II and Alexandra Feodorovna. She appeared often as a guest artist at the Cologne Opera from 1899 until the end of her career; doing the same at Oper Frankfurt from 1900 onwards. She also made guest appearances at the Deutschen Landestheater, Prague (1901); the Dresden Hofoper (1907); the National Theatre Brno (1911); and the Bavarian State Opera (1916). In 1910 she performed the parts of Brangäne and Clytemnestra at the Royal Opera House, Covent Garden. She performed on some of the earliest recordings made by the Gramophone & Typewriter Co in Berlin in 1901, and also made recordings with Anker Records, Beka Records, Edison Records, His Master's Voice, Lyrophon, Odeon Records, and Pathé Records.

Goetze died in Berlin on 18 December 1922.
