= Stern Conservatory =

Former music school in Berlin, Germany

Coordinates: 52°30′18″N 13°22′39″E

The Stern Conservatory (Stern'sches Konservatorium) was a private music school in Berlin with many distinguished tutors and alumni. The school is now part of Berlin University of the Arts.

== History ==
It was founded in 1850 as the Berliner Musikschule by Julius Stern, Theodor Kullak and Adolf Bernhard Marx. Kullak withdrew from the conservatory in 1855 in order to create a new academy of sculpture and three-dimensional art. With Marx's withdrawal in 1856, the conservatory came exclusively under the Stern family and adopted its name. In 1894 it was taken over by Gustav Hollaender (the uncle of film composer Friedrich Hollaender), who moved the school's location to the Berlin Philharmonic concert hall on Bernburger Strasse in Berlin-Kreuzberg.

In the course of the Gleichschaltung process, the Stern Academy in 1936 was renamed Konservatorium der Reichshauptstadt Berlin controlled by the Nazi regime. Gustav Hollaender's heirs were disseized, but for a few years they were able to run a "Jewish Private Music School Hollaender" until they were deported and murdered in 1941.

In 1945, the school was again renamed as the Städtisches Konservatorium (City Conservatory) in what was to become West Berlin. In 1966 it was merged with the public Akademische Hochschule für Musik into the Staatliche Hochschule für Musik und Darstellende Kunst (Berlin State School of Music and the Performing Arts), since 2001 the Berlin University of the Arts.

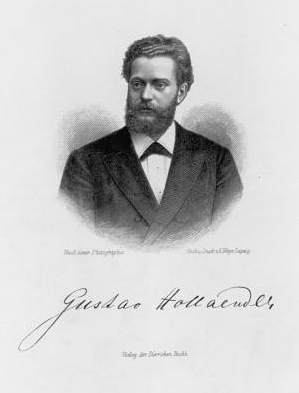
Gustav Hollaender

== Directors ==
- 1883–1894: Jenny Meyer
- 1894–1915: Gustav Hollaender
- 1915–1930: Alexander von Fielitz
- 1930–1933: Paul Graener
- 1933–1935: Siegfried Eberhardt

Konservatorium der Reichshauptstadt Berlin:

- 1936–1945: Bruno Kittel

Städtisches Konservatorium:

- 1946–1949: Heinz Tiessen
- 1950–1960: Hans Joachim Moser

== Professors ==
- 1854–1864 Hans von Bülow
- 1855- ?: Ferdinand Laub
- 1864–1871: Rudolf Radecke
- 1866–1869: Friedrich Kiel
- 1867–1878: Eduard Franck
- 1874–1877: Arnold Krug
- 1884–1885: Georg Wilhelm Rauchenecker
- 1890–1897: Friedrich Gernsheim
- 1897–1903: Hans Pfitzner
- 1884–1906(?): Georg von Petersenn
- mind. 1896–1911: Martin Krause
- 1897–1904: Ernst Jedliczka
- 1898–1905: Ernst Eduard Taubert
- 1898–1900: David Maurice Levett
- 1904–1906: Sandra Drouker
- 1906–1915: Leo Portnoff
- 1900–1920: Engelbert Humperdinck
- 1902–1903 and 1911: Arnold Schoenberg
- 1904–1924: Arthur Willner
- mind. 1919–1929: Rudolf Maria Breithaupt
- 1927-c.1933: Ottilie Metzger (also an alumnus)
- 1934–1940, 1962–1966: Konrad Wölki
- 1935–1960: Conrad Hansen
- Herbert Ahlendorf
- Wilhelm Klatte
- James Kwast
- Max Löwengard
- Paul Lutzenko
- Selma Nicklass-Kempner
- Gustav Pohl
- Nikolaus Rothmühl
- Else Schmitz-Gohr
- Victor Hollaender
- Leopold Schmidt
- Robert Lösch
- 1992–2012: David Friedman
- Mayer-Mahr. (1932)

== Distinguished students ==
- 1860–1862: Hermann Goetz
- 1884– ? : Bruno Walter
- 1887-1976 Bertha Tideman-Wijers
- 1891–1894: Ernst Mielck
- 1892–1894: Alberto Nepomuceno
- 1896: Edwin Fischer
- late 19th-early 20th century: Charlotte Ruegger
- 1899–1902 Selmar Jacobson (Janson)
- 1901–1979: Mischa Portnoff, composer and pianist
- 1902–1903: Melitta Lewin
- 1903–1907: Emil Honigberger
- 1903–1906: Charles Griffes
- 1905: Otto Klemperer
- 1906–? : Marek Weber
- 1906–1908: Manuel Ponce
- 1906–1909: Clara Abramowitz, soprano
- 1908–1913: Boris Kroyt, violinist and violist
- 1909–1911: Max Nivelli
- 1910–1913: Efim Schachmeister, violinist
- 1912–1917: Meta Seinemeyer
- 1913-1914: Gustaf Nordqvist
- 1913–1915: Margarete Krämer-Bergau
- 1913–1918: Claudio Arrau
- 1914–1924: Friedrich Löwe
- 1915–1920: Lisy Fischer, pianist
- 1920– ? : İzzet Nezih Albayrak, violinist
- 1920s: Else Schmitz-Gohr, composer and pianist
- 1924–1926: Marc Lavry
- 1924–1929: Kees van Baaren
- 1924–1929: Karl Ristenpart
- 1925- ?: Nadia Friedlander, German/British artist
- 1930–1935: Ruth Schönthal
- 1946–1952: Hans-Wilfrid Schulze-Margraf
- 1956–1965: Christian Schmidt
- ? –1936: Haim Alexander
- ? –1933: Manfred Bukofzer
- Robert Christian Bachmann
- Siegfried Eberhardt, violinist
- Issy Geiger
- Marie Goetze, contralto
- Alexander Heinemann, baritone
- Asparukh Leschnikoff, tenor
- Estelle Liebling, soprano and voice teacher
- Moritz Moszkowski
- Josef Plaut
- Julius Prott (aka Guilio Perotti), tenor
- Heinrich Reimers, pianist
- Willi Sommerfeld
- Frieda Hempel
- Else Streit, composer
- Fred Werner
- Kathinka Paulsen White, soprano
