= Vera Vinogradova =

Soviet composer and pianist

Vera Pavlovna Vinogradova Biek
- Вера Павловна Виногдрадова
- Born: 23 February 1895; Leningrad
- Died: 19 April 1982 (aged 87); London
- Occupation(s): Composer, pianist
- Spouse: Ben Berlin

Vera Pavlovna Vinogradova Biek (Russian: Вера Павловна Виноградова; 23 February 1895 – 19 April 1982) was a Soviet composer and pianist. She performed and published her music under the name "Vera Vinogradova."

Vinogradova was born in Leningrad. She studied music at the Leningrad Conservatory under Alexander Glazunov, Leonid Nikolayev, and Maximilian Steinberg. Following her graduation, Vinogradova remained at the Leningrad Conservatory to teach. She married jazz musician Hermann Biek (later known as "Ben Berlin") and they had a son (Leopold) and a daughter (Nina).

Vinogradova presented piano recitals throughout Europe and America. She and her husband lived in Berlin for a while, but moved to Tallinn in 1933 when Germany adopted a number of anti-Jewish laws. There, she taught piano, composed, and became involved with the Russian Theater and Music Society.

In 1936, the family moved to England permanently. Vinogradova continued to give piano lessons and compose. Peter Brook and Peter Ustinov were among her students. Vinogradova insisted that all of her students perform. She believed that music must be shared, and told her students, "The only reason for you to learn music is . . . to share it with others."

Vinogradova's music was published by Augener & Co and Benno Balan (Berlin). Her compositions included:

== Chamber ==
- String Quartet
- Suite (violin and piano)

== Orchestra ==
- Ballade (piano and chamber orchestra)
- Piano Concerto

== Piano ==
- Deux Danses, opus 21
- Friends of Youth (with Hermann Biek)
- Tableaux d'Enfants, opus 25
- Toccatina, opus 29
