= Konrad Wölki =

German composer and musician (1904–1983)

- Konrad Wölki, by Edwin Mertes
- Born: 27 December 1904; Moabit, Berlin
- Died: 5 July 1983 (aged 78); Frohnau, Berlin

Konrad Wölki (27 December 1904 – 5 July 1983) was a German composer, mandolinist and music educator who contributed to the musically critical appreciation of the Zupforchesters (German mandolin orchestras—may also include other plucked string instruments or conventional orchestral instruments). Historian Paul Sparks labeled Wölki "the founding father of modern German plucked-string music."

He was a senior member of the German Mandolin and Guitar Player Federation (D.M.G.B.) until he was forced out in 1935 and replaced with a Nazi party member. In 1961 he helped create the Bund Deutscher Zupfmusiker (League of German plucked instrumentalists, BDZ), with members from his own D.M.G.B. and the German Workers Mandolinists Federation (D.A.M.B.), another mandolin organization closed down under the Nazis).

The D.M.G.B. federation published compositions for its members to play. Wölki, the DMGB's "most significant figure" composed music in the 1920s for the mandolin and guitar based orchestras "that demonstrated the dramatic potential and range of color" possible for the plucked orchestra.

In the 1930s, Wölki explored 18th century mandolin music from 1760s and 1770s Paris and reached a conclusion that caused controversy. He found that the classical music of the period that used mandolin had been played without tremolo. While some cherished the tremolo, others embraced "a return to classical methods". His influence through the works he composed resulted in a restraint in the use of tremolo in new German compositions.

He was the author of a history of the mandolin, Geschichte der Mandoline (1939), and a three-volume mandolin method, Deutsche Schule für Mandoline. He continued to teach in Berlin, educating many of the next generation of mandolinists.

He composed or arranged 103 pieces of published music.

== Life and work ==
Konrad Wölki was born in 1904 in Moabit (Berlin). At the age of 12, he became a member of the children's choir at the Royal Opera in Berlin. In 1922, at the age of 18, he founded a Zupforchester (plucked-string orchestra), which was initially called Mandolinenorchester Fidelio [Fidelio Mandolin Orchestra], but was renamed several times in the following years and since 1937 finally was called Berliner Lautengilde [Berlin lute guild].

From 1934 to 1940 Wölki taught plucked instruments at the Stern Conservatory (after 1945: Municipal Conservatory) in Berlin and was from 1939 a member of the examination board for the state music teacher examination. From 1948 to 1959 he directed the Musikschule Reinickendorf; from 1962 to 1966, he led the seminar for youth music educators at the Municipal Conservatory, which was later affiliated to the State University of Music and the Performing Arts (now: University of the Arts).

Wölki is considered one of the first to contribute to the general recognition of the Zupforchester originating from the field of amateur music in scientific circles. He did this through the historical exploration of the mandolin, through numerous original compositions and arrangements, but above all through the publication of textbooks for plucked instruments. While the mandolin had been played mostly using tremolo since Romantic period, Wölki made the classical playing technique popular again, which uses the tremolo only occasionally as a stylistic device. In his Suite Number 1 (1935), he used classical methods, especially no tremolo. In Suite Number 2 (1937), he incorporated small amounts of tremolo as a stylistic device, setting an example for future German compositions.

Together with his wife Gerda he also recognized the trend towards guitar playing in the 1950s and promoted the choral interaction of guitars. For these merits he was appointed honorary member of the Bund Deutscher Zupfmusiker.

Initially, Wölki composed in the Romantic or Baroque style, but from the 1950s he used more modern harmonies and rhythms. However, he was not enthusiastic about the experimental and avant-garde music of his time.

In 1972, Wölki gave the direction of the lute guild to his wife, who had led the Jugendzupforchester since 1953 and since 1958 the guitar choir of the association. Retired, he was also a member of the jury of the Jugend musiziert competition and regularly published for the journal Zupfmusik-Gitarre (today: Concertino) of the Bund Deutscher Zupfmusiker.

Konrad Wölki died in July 1983 in Frohnau (Berlin). For his funeral on July 19, former members of the Lautengilde played his Suite No. 1.

== Works ==
Konrad Wölki has published numerous textbooks for Mandolin and Zupforchester and has published 103 pieces of music for Zupforchester. Of his educational works were distributed to 1977, a million copies. His most important own compositions include:

=== Compositions ===
- Overture No. 1 (A major)
- Overture No. 2 (F-sharp minor)
- Overture No. 3 (D major)
- Overture No. 4 (B minor) for plucked orchestra and woodwinds
- Overture No. 5 (C major)
- Overture No. 6 (G major)
- Suite No. 1 for Zupforchester, Op. 29 (1935)
- Suite No. 2, Op. 31 (1937) ("Music for simple celebration hours")
- Small suite in G major
- Concerto for violin, 2 flutes and Zupforchester, Op. 57 (1954, new version 1966)
- Rondo scherzoso
- Three old-fashioned dances
- Vienna concert

=== Books ===
- Das Studienwerk für Mandoline, Berlin N 65, Swakopmunder Str. 12 : Ragotzky
- Mandoline, Gitarre, Laute, Berlin : H. Ragotzky, 1936
- Das Studienwerk für Gitarre, Berlin N 65, Swakopmunder Str. 12 : Ragotzky, 1939.
- Das goldene Akkordeon-Buch, Berlin : Globus Verlag, 1939.
- Instrumentationslehre für Zupfinstrumente, Berlin : Ragotzky, 1948.
- Melodisches Gitarrenspiel, Berlin[-Lichterfelde] : Apollo-Verlag, 1960
- Gitarre allein, Berlin : Apollo-Verlag, 1966.
- Musiklehre für Gitarrenspieler, Berlin : Ries und Erler, 1970
- Gitarrenspiel am Anfang, Berlin : Apollo-Verlag, 1971.
- 50 Jahre Berliner Lautengilde, Hamburg : Trekel, 1984.
- Der Akkordeon-Musikant, Berlin[-Lichterfelde] : Apollo-Verlag (3 volumes)
- Deutsche Schule für Gitarre, Berlin N 65, Swakopmunder Str. 12 : Ragotzky
- Deutsche Schule für Mandoline, Berlin N 65, Swakopmunder Str. 12 : Ragotzky
- Flötentöne, Berlin-[Lichterfelde] : Apollo-Verlag
- Gitarre zum Lied, Berlin[-Lichterfelde] : Apollo-Verlag
- Schule für Mandoline, Berlin : Apollo-Verlag
- Wölki-Schule für Akkordeon, Berlin : Curtius
