= Jenny Meyer =

German mezzo-soprano

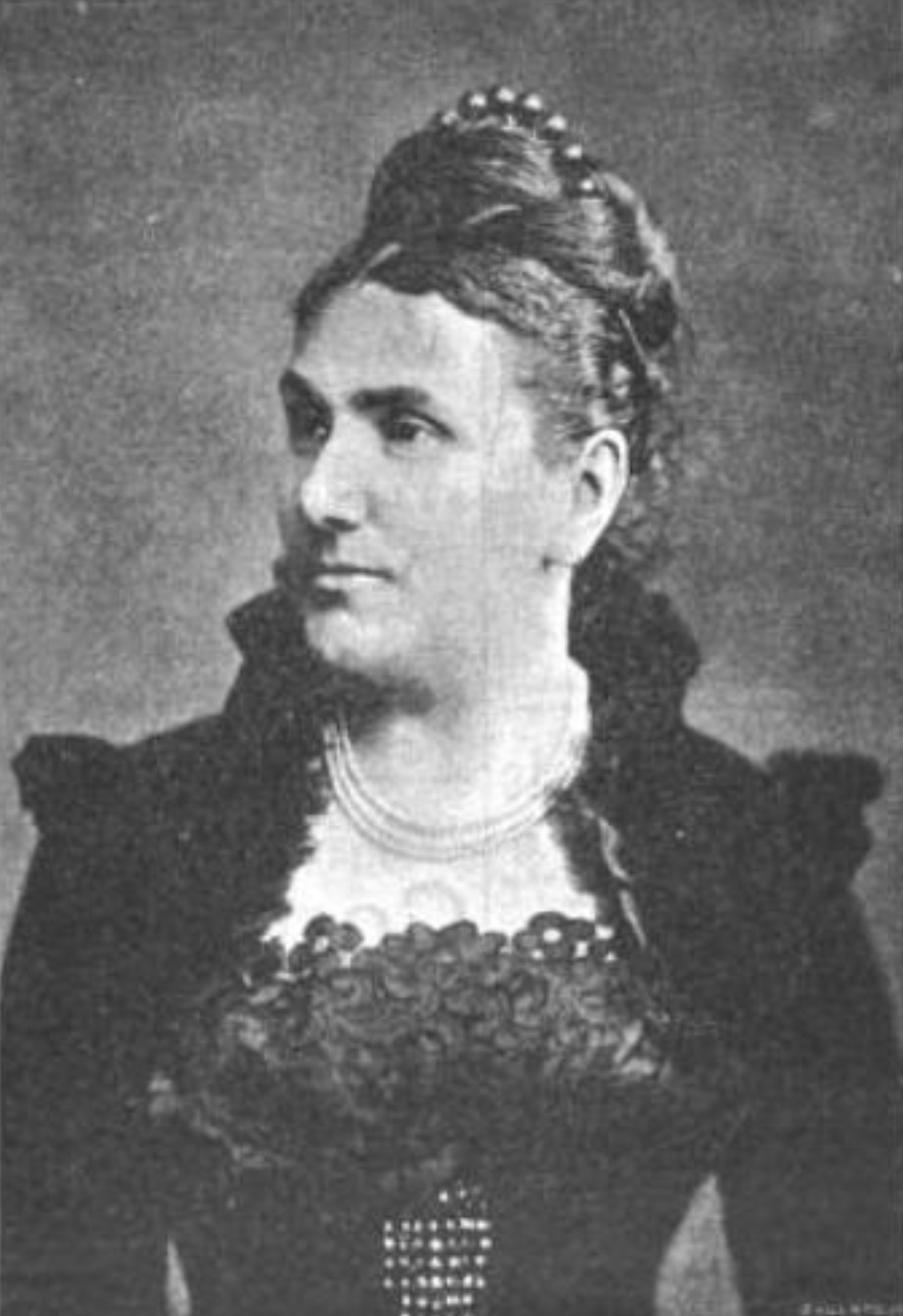
Jenny Meyer

Jenny Meyer (26 March 1834 – 20 July 1894) was a German mezzo-soprano and music educator. She had an active career as a concert singer, but chose not to appear in operas despite many offers which she declined. She was the director of the Stern Conservatory in Berlin from 1888 until 1894.

== Life ==
Jenny Meyer was born in Berlin, Germany on 26 March 1834. (Note: As regards the year of birth, the available sources provide different information. There are corresponding entries for the years 1834, 1836 and 1837 respectively. 1834 should be given preference in this case, also taking into account the data of the Common Standards File (GND).) She was the daughter of Itzig Meyer and his wife Wilhelmine. Her father was a wealthy banker and merchant. Her primary voice teacher was Caroline Caspari with whom she studied privately. She also spent two years studying under Julius Stern at the Stern Conservatory. She began her studies with Stern, her brother-in-law, in 1854 two years after he had married her elder sister Elisabeth (1831–1919).

Meyer had a successful career as a concert mezzo-soprano. Despite many offers to appear in operas, including an invitation to join the Berlin Hofoper, she chose to eschew that medium in favor of the concert stage. She made her concert debut in 1855 in the oratorio Luther by the composer Julius Schneider, and was heard for the first time as a soloist in 1856 at the Gewandhaus in Leipzig. Performances followed in 1857 in Weimar, Hanover, Cologne and Hamburg. She also gave guest performances in Paris, and in 1859 she appeared several times in London in court concerts for Queen Victoria.

In 1865, Meyer began working as a singing teacher at the Stern Conservatory. After the death of her brother-in-law Julius Stern in 1883, she became the sole owner and from 1888 director of the Conservatory and led it until her death. One of her pupils was contralto Marie Goetze.

In October 1890, her sister Anna Meyer applied to the Emperor and King for "the title of Professor" to Jenny Meyer. The Minister of Education Gustav von Goßler rejected her request with the remark "that it has not been customary in the Prussian administration up too now to distinguish a female person by the title of professor". However, he noted that Jenny Meyer "is known as a capable teacher".

Meyer died in Berlin on 20 July 1894.
