= Alexander von Fielitz =

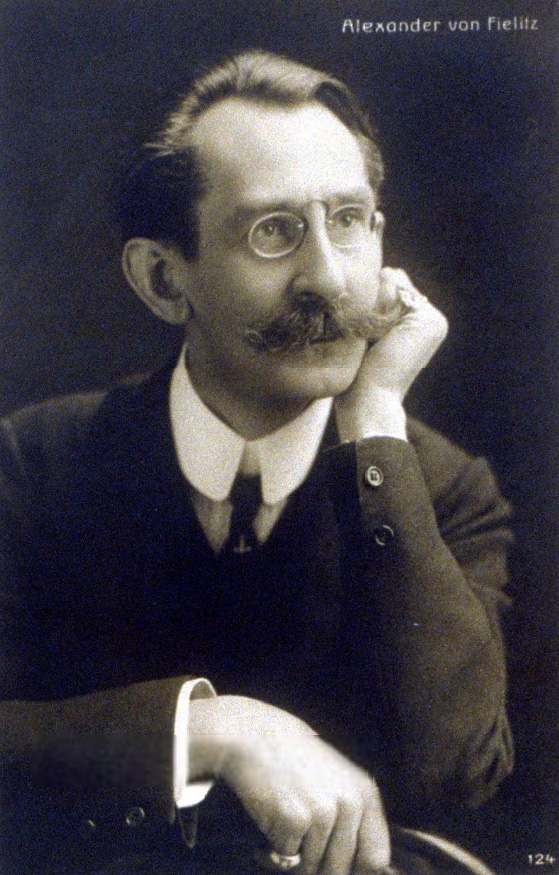
- Alexander von Fielitz in 1911
- Born: December 28, 1860; Leipzig, Kingdom of Saxony
- Died: July 29, 1930 (aged 69); Bad Salzungen, Weimar Republic
- Occupations: Composer, conductor
- Employer(s): Stern Conservatory, Berlin; Chicago Musical College; Chicago Symphony Orchestra
- Notable work: Vendetta (opera, 1891); Das stille Dorf ("The Silent Village", opera, 1900); Toskanischen Lieder ("Tuscan songs")
- Spouse: Maria Leonardi (m. 1886)

Alexander von Fielitz (December 28, 1860 – July 29, 1930) was a German composer.

== Life and work ==
Fielitz studied with Julius Schulhoff and Edmund Kretschmer in Dresden. He worked as a theater conductor in Zurich, Lübeck, and Leipzig, and afterwards taught for several years at the Stern Conservatory in Berlin. In 1905 he became a teacher at the Chicago Musical College and in 1906 he became the conductor of the Chicago Symphony Orchestra. From 1908 he again taught at the Stern Conservatory, which he headed from 1915.

== Compositions ==
Fielitz composed two operas – Vendetta in 1891 and Das stille Dorf ("The Silent Village") in 1900. He composed several songs; his Toskanische Lieder ("Tuscan songs") were particularly well-known. His romance for piano and violin was also popular.

== Works ==
Alexander von Fielitz, Eliland. Ein Sang vom Chiemsee. ("Eliland. A song from the Chiemsee."). Poem by Karl Stieler. Breitkopf & Härtel, Berlin, Leipzig, Brussels, 1900.
