= Howard McFarlane =

British musician

Howard Osmond McFarlane (November 13, 1894, London – March 6, 1983, London) was an English jazz trumpeter.

McFarlane played in film palaces from 1919 into the early 1920s. He played in Alex Hyde's band after this, recording with them in Germany in 1924. The group dissolved in the middle of the decade and McFarlane remained in Germany, playing with Bernard Etté (1924–26) and Dajos Béla (1925-32) and recording as a leader in 1926-27. He moved back to England and played with Jack Jackson in 1933-34; after spending time in Argentina with Béla again (1935–37), he did a tour of Europe from 1937 to 1940. He then joined the BBC Dance Orchestra, where he played from 1940 to 1957.
