= Efim Schachmeister =

German violinist and bandleader

Chaim "Efim" Schachmeister (22 July 1894 – 6 October 1944) was a German violinist and bandleader. He also recorded under the pseudonyms Sascha Elmo and Joan Florescu.

Born in Kiev to Romanian Jewish parents, from 1910 to 1913 he studied music at the Stern Conservatory in Berlin. In 1915 he joined the Popescu Gypsy Band (Zigeuner-Kapelle Popescu). In 1923 he became bandleader, and the following year embarked on a German tour that ended in April 1925 with an engagement at the Hotel Excelsior in Berlin.

This was followed by engagements at top Berlin dancehalls such as the Barberina, the Palais de Danse, and the Pavillon Mascotte. Beginning in this period he signed with Deutsche Grammophon, which billed him as the "King of all Dance-Violinists". Even the Nazi-sponsored Encyclopedia of Jews in Music describes Schachmeister as a "defining jazz bandleader of the "Systemzeit"."

Schachmeister's style evolved over the course of the 1920s from ragtime to the more modern jazz. His orchestra included many notable musicians, including the trumpeter Louis de Vries, the trombonist Henri van den Bossche, the banjoist Mike Danzi, and the pianist Adam Gelbtrunk. He himself played the violin, characteristically in a gypsy-manner, but was also capable of adjusting his style to a more Blues-influenced technique when necessary. His 1927 recording of "Saint Louis Blues" is illustrative of his tendency to combine elements of Blues and the shtetl style.

As a Jew and a jazz musician, he was considered doubly degenerate by the Nazi regime, and left Germany soon after Hitler's rise to power. He first traveled to Belgium, but later settled permanently in Argentina, along with his fellow German-Jewish bandleaders Dajos Béla and Sam Baskini. He died in Argentina in 1944, aged fifty.

== Sources ==
- Klaus Krüger: Fox auf 78. Zeitschrift, München/Dietramszell, 2003.
- Horst H. Lange, Jazz in Deutschland. Berlin (Colloquium), 1966 u.ö.
- Rainer E. Lotz, German Ragtime and Prehistory of Jazz – Volume 1: The Sound Documents. London (Storyville), 1985.
- Rainer E. Lotz, Diskografie der deutschen Tanzmusik – Band 8. Bonn (Lotz), 2003.
- Rainer E. Lotz, Deutsche Hot-Discographie. Cake Walk, Ragtime, Hot Dance & Jazz – ein Handbuch. Bonn (Lotz), 2006 ISBN 3-9810248-1-8.
- Horst H. J. Bergmeier, Rainer E. Lotz, Der Jazz in Deutschland. Vom Cakewalk zum Jazz. – Begleitbuch zur CD-Box Bear Family Records BCD 16909 CP, 2007, 26261-X).
- Jürgen Wölfer, Jazz in Deutschland – Das Lexikon. Alle Musiker und Plattenfirmen von 1920 bis heute. Hannibal Verlag: Höfen 2008, ISBN 978-3-85445-274-4
