= Portnow =

Portnow is an occupational surname derived from the Russian word "portnoy", "tailor". Notable people with the surname include:

- Neil Portnow, American music industry executive
- Richard Portnow (born 1947), American actor
