= Alex Hyde =

American jazz musician

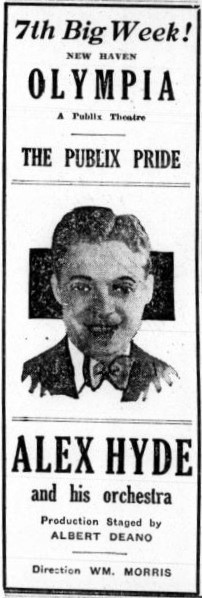
Advertisement in July 1927 Variety

Alex Hyde (February 17, 1898 – July 7, 1956) was an American jazz bandleader and violinist.

== Biography ==
Hyde was born in Hamburg, Germany, on February 17, 1898. His family emigrated to the U.S in April 1898. He was tutored by a professional violinist.

He founded his own dance band, the Romance of Rhythm Orchestra, and played with them locally in New York City (1919–22) and throughout North America (1922–23). After World War I, Hyde visited Germany and entertained U.S. military personnel in the then-occupied Rhineland. The Romance of Rhythm Orchestra first recorded in 1923, and when touring Germany in 1924, they released material on Deutsche Grammophon. Among Hyde's soloists for these recordings are Howard McFarlane, pianist Walker O'Neill, and saxophonist Eddie Grosso. He recorded as a leader with a different band in 1924-25, also in Germany; Gene Sedric plays on some of these recordings.

Hyde met Michael Danzi in New York and Danzi joined Hyde's newly-formed Alex Hyde Orchestra.

Upon his return to the U.S., he ran his own talent agency, composed music for military bands in the Air Force, and did work in the studios in Hollywood. He also co-managed an insurance company with his brothers. One of his brothers was talent agent Johnny Hyde.

Hyde died on July 7, 1956, in Santa Monica, California.
