= Leo Portnoff =

Ukrainian-born composer (1875–1940)

Leo Portnoff Лео Портнов
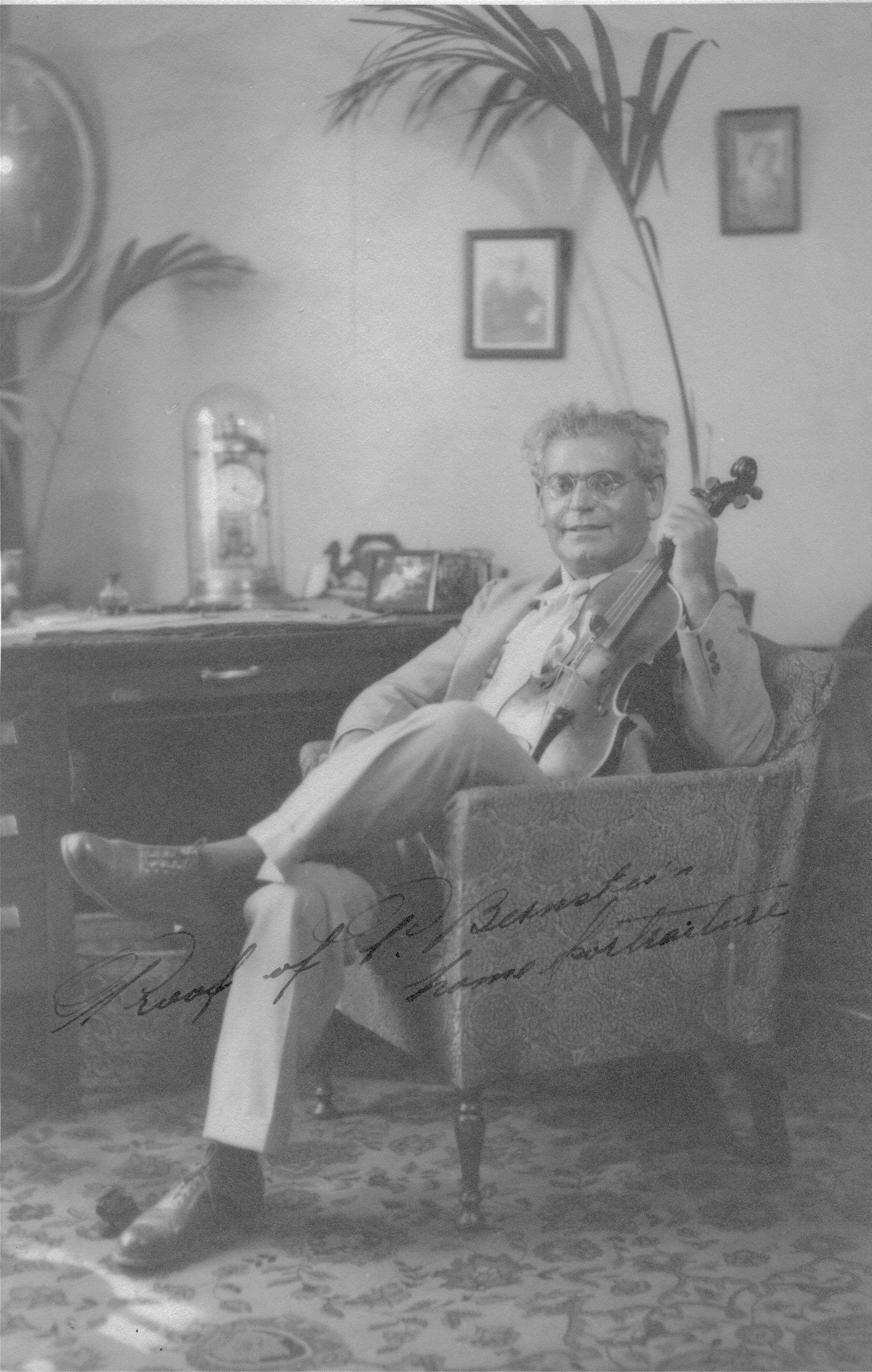

Background information
- Born: 1875; Kiev, Russian Empire
- Died: 1940 (aged 64–65) Miami, Florida, U.S.
- Genres: Classical
- Occupations: Composer; Teacher

Leo Portnoff (Note: Ukrainian: Лео Портнов, romanized: Leo Portnov) (1875–1940) was a musician, teacher, and composer. Born in Kyiv, he was a professor at the Stern Conservatory in Berlin from 1906 to 1915. He arrived in the United States in 1922. He initially resided in Brooklyn, and later moved to Florida to teach music at the University of Miami. Portnoff died in Miami, Florida.

== Selected works ==
- Concertino, Op. 13 for violin and piano
- Concertino, Op. 14 for violin and piano
- Die Gazelle for violin and piano
- Minuet in Old Style for violin and piano
- On the Dnieper for orchestra
- Russian Fantasia No. 1 in A minor for violin and piano
- Russian Fantasia No. 2 in D minor for violin and piano
- Russian Fantasia No. 3 in A minor for violin and piano
- Russian Fantasia No. 4 in E minor for violin and piano
- Waving Fields for violin and piano
