= Ben Berlin =

Estonian jazz musician (1896–1944)

- Born: Hermann Biek; 1896; Reval, Governorate of Estonia
- Died: 1944 (aged 47–48); England
- Occupation: Jazz musician
- Known for: Founder of the Ben Berlin Dance Orchestra in 1928 (Germany)
- Spouse: Vera Vinogradova

Ben Berlin (born Hermann Biek; 1896–1944) was a jazz musician born in Reval, Estonia (Now Tallinn) in 1896. He married composer Vera Vinogradova around 1920 and they had two children, Leopold and Nina.

Berlin founded the Ben Berlin Dance Orchestra in Germany in 1928, producing records with Deutsche Grammophon such as "Küss mich und morgen vergiss mich" and "Roses of Yesterday". As a Jew, he left Nazi Germany in 1933, moving to The Netherlands, Austria, France and finally England where he died in 1944, sitting at his desk.
