= Dajos Béla =

Russian jazz violinist and bandleader

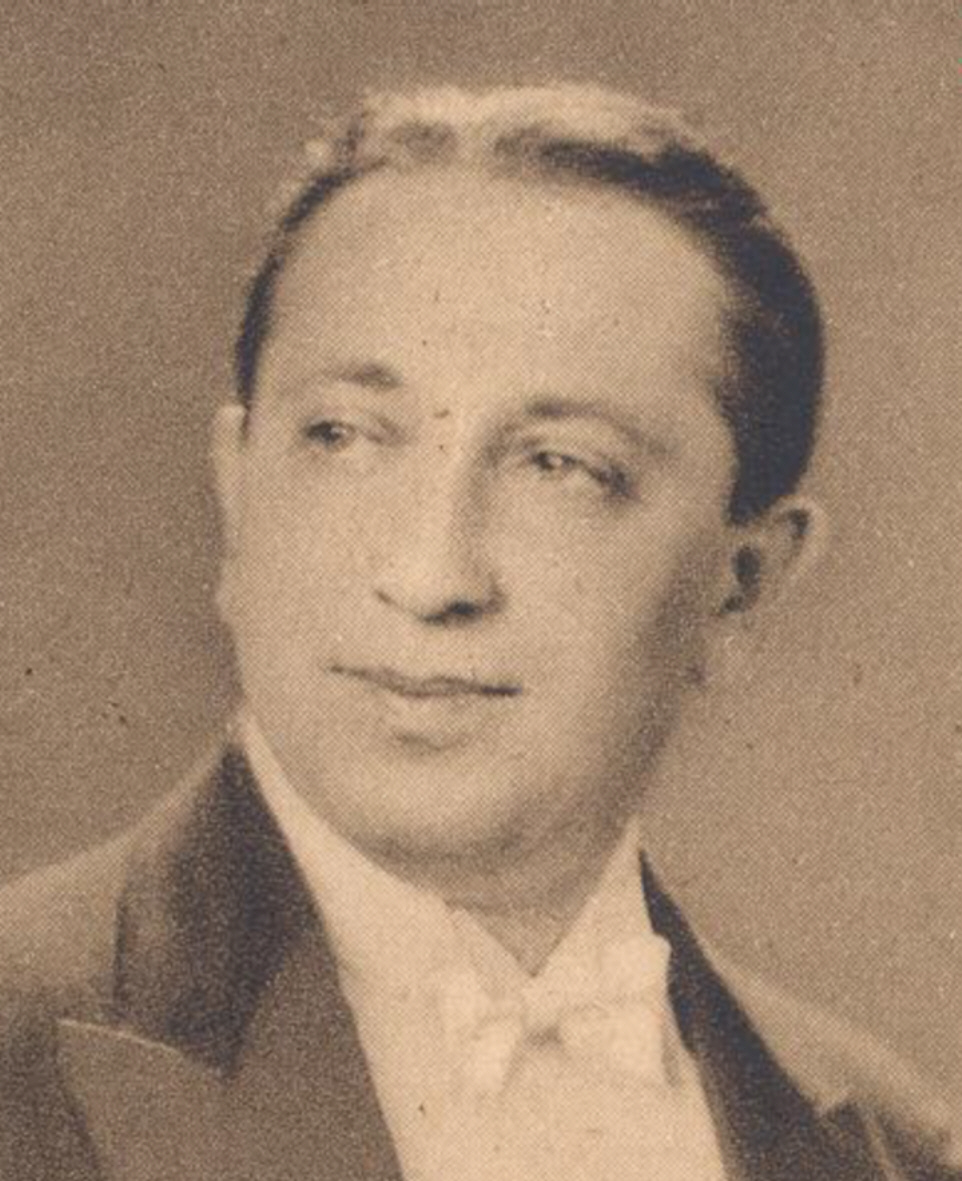
- Born: Leon Golzmann; 19 December 1897; Kiev, Ukraine
- Died: 5 December 1978 (aged 80); La Falda, Argentina
- Occupations: jazz violinist, bandleader
- Known for: The Odeon Five, Mac’s Jazz Orchestra, The Clive Williams Jazzband

Leon Golzmann or as he was more commonly known, Dajos Béla (19 December 1897 – 5 December 1978), was a Ukrainian jazz violinist and bandleader.

== Career ==
Golzmann was born in Kyiv, now part of Ukraine, into a Jewish family (his father Itsko Shulim-Iosevich Goltsman was from Berdichev, mother - Reyzya Nusen-Aryevna Goltsman). He served as a soldier during World War I, after which he studied music in Moscow. He then continued his studies in Berlin, where he started playing in local venues. He was contacted by Carl Lindström AG to make recordings and started his own salon orchestra, at which period he changed his name to the more Hungarian-sounding Dajos Béla, Hungarian or Romanian music then being popular in Germany. Along with those of Paul Godwin and Marek Weber, his orchestra became one of the most popular in Germany and gained a high reputation abroad. He played a range of music, but for jazz music often recorded under different names, such as The Odeon Five, Mac's Jazz Orchestra and the Clive Williams Jazzband.

As soon as the Nazis came to power in Germany in 1933 Béla, who was Jewish, started touring abroad. In 1935 he travelled to Buenos Aires, where he remained for the rest of his life. He died in La Falda, Argentina, in 1978.

Among the many musicians who played with him or in his orchestra were the pianist and composer Franz Grothe, the jazz-musicians Rudi Anhang and Kurt Hohenberger, the singers Rex Allen, Paul O'Montis and Henri René, banjo-player Mike Danzi and accordionist Will Glahé, composers Wilhelm Grosz and Willy Engel-Berger, and actors Marta Eggerth and Max Hansen.

== Select discography ==
- Waitin' For The Moon / Adieu, Mimi (Shimmy) (Odeon 0–1921),
- Humming / Bummel-Petrus (Intermezzo) (Odeon A 71942), 1921
- Radio-Tango / Opern-Foxtrott in Potpourri-Form (Odeon 49039), 1925
- (as Kapelle Merton): Dinah / Sevilla (Beka B.6071), 1926
- Who ? ("Du ! Wann bist du bei mir ?") / Zwei rote Rosen, ein zarter Kuss (Odeon 0–2087), Januar 1927
- Heinzelmännchens Wachtparade / Dornröschens Brautfahrt (Odeon 0–2101), 1927
- Santa Lucia / Venezia (Odeon 0–2122), 1927
- Hund och Katt / Ref. sång (Odeon D-4948), 1929
- Kennst du das kleine Haus am Michigansee / Anna Aurora (Odeon D-4975), 1929
- (as Odeon-Tanz-Orchester und Gesang): In Sanssouci, dort wo die alte Mühle steht (Odeon O-11301), 1929
- (with Leo Frank (singer)): Im Rosengarten von Sanssouci, 1930

In addition, he made around 70 records with the tenor Richard Tauber (1891–1948) as violin soloist or orchestra director.

== Sources ==
- Lyman, Darryl. Great Jews in Music, J. D. Publishers, 1986.
- Sadie, Stanley. The new Grove dictionary of music and musicians, Macmillan, 1980.
- Wolfram Knauer (1986, Pb.): Jazz in Deutschland. Darmstädter Beiträge zur Jazzforschung 5. Hofheim : Wolke Verlag (in German)
