= Mike Danzi =

American jazz musician

Michael Danzi
- Born: September 1, 1898; New York City
- Died: February 13, 1986 (aged 87) New York City, United States
- Occupations: Banjoist, guitarist Jazz band leader
- Years active: 1921-1961

Mike Danzi (September 1, 1898, New York City - February 13, 1986, New York City) was an American jazz and light music banjoist, guitarist, and bandleader. He has been cited as one of several musicians who successfully transplanted American popular musical genres to Germany during the 1920s and authored a valuable eyewitness account of the evolution of popular music in Germany prior to World War II.

== Biography ==
Danzi was the son of Italian immigrants. His father, Domenico Danzi, arrived in the United States in 1892. Michael was born several years later in New York City.

Danzi played violin early in his career, including as the leader of an early jazz group called the Red Devils Jazz Band. In 1921, he switched to playing banjo and worked as a vaudeville performer. From 1917-1924 he also performed extensively within nightclubs, hotels, dance halls, movie theaters, hotels and at Coney island. As a member of Wilbur Sweatman's orchestra in 1924, he played alongside Duke Ellington. Later that year he began playing the banjo with Alex Hyde's Romance Rhythm Orchestra, which toured Europe in 1924-1925.

While performing in Berlin during 1925, he emerged with the Hyde's Original New York Jazz Orchestra playing banjo and clarinet in an on-screen performance within the silent film "Variete" which was directed by E. A. Dupont and featured the music of Erno Rapee. This was the first of several films in which Danzi would perform while concertizing in Germany. In addition he appeared in Berlin's Luna Park and at the Esplanade Hotel near Potsdamer Plaz for the boxer Jack Dempsey. Soon after his arrival in Germany, he was also introduced to the bandleader Eric Borchard and an English saxophonist named Billy Bartholomew during a visit to a cellar cabaret in Hamburg while traveling to Munich. Danzi gladly joined them both in a performance which lasted until midnight.

Instead of returning to the United States with the Hyde's band however, Danzi remained in Germany for the next fourteen years, playing with Bernard Etté, Harry Revel, Erno Rapee and Dajos Béla. In addition, he concertized with his own group, The Virginians, which he founded in 1929 and was formally led by Teddy Kline. From 1924-1939 he appeared as a free-lancer with several jazz bands while performing in hotels, radio stations, theaters, cabarets and film studios. During this time, he also collaborated with the English Jazz trumpeter Howard McFarlane as a member of the Marek Weber Orchestra in performances at the landmark Adlon Hotel in 1926. Later in 1929, he collaborated with Mischa Spoliansky's orchestra in the musical revue Zwei Krawatten. While contributing to an early production of Kurt Weill's Aufstiegund Fall der Stadt Mahagonny, Danzi was also praised by the composer for his unique ability to interpret and perform the chords featured in the score exactly as written. Weill noted that most banjo players claimed that the part was not really written for the banjo at all!

External image
- Mike Danzi with trumpeter Howard Osmond McFarlane and the Fahrbach-Ehmki Orchestra in 1927; Here on grammophon-platten.de

Danzi worked in Germany through the 1930s, even though the Nazis condemned jazz music and it became less palatable for Italians to live in Germany after Benito Mussolini's rise to power. He played in the orchestra at La Scala under Otto Stenzel in 1935, and worked on German radio and with light-music orchestras. In 1938 he made a few early television appearances with Otto Sachsenhauser.

In October 1939, he had an altercation with the doorman at the UFA Film Studios when he refused to carry out the Hitler salute, and he left Germany to return to the United States a few days later. He continued his career in the United States while appearing in the 1950s on the Broadway stage in productions of the musical The Threepenny Opera and The Rose Tattoo in addition to playing at the Radio City Music Hall in 1956. He also emerged in the Off-Broadway Phoenix Theater while collaborating with the accordionist John Serry in a revival of A Month in the Country. In addition, he performed regularly in Broadway pit orchestras, weekly television shows, commercials and in concert hall orchestras. He also served as chief copyist and librarian at the Radio City Music Hall.

Over the decades, Danzi collaborated with a variety of notable performing artists within the United States and Europe including: Julius Rudel, Marlene Dietrich, Marek Weber, Lotte Lenya, Richard Tauber and Pat Boone.

Danzi was a virtuoso banjo player and also proficient on several other instruments including: guitar, mandolin, and Hawaiian guitar. He was also capable of performing on the violin, clarinet and trumpet. As a prolific performer, he is credited with contributing to recordings of over 17,000 different titles. In addition, he has been cited as one of several musicians who successfully transplanted American popular musical genres to Germany during the 1920s. His autobiography has been cited as a valuable resource for scholars and researchers specializing in the evolution of Jazz music in Europe during the 1920s, 1930s and 1940s.

External audio
- Mike Danzi with trumpeter Howard McFarlane playing "Then I'll Be Happy" in Berlin circa 1926; Here on grammophone-platen.de

== Death ==
Micahel Danzi died in New York City on February 13, 1986

== Filmography ==
- Variete - playing banjo as a member of the Alex Hyde Orchestra

== Publications ==
- American Musician in Germany, 1942-1939 Memoirs of the Jazz, Entertainment and Movie World in Berlin During the Weimar Republic and the Nazi Era-and in the United States by Michael Danzi, Editor: Rainer E. Lotz. (1986).

== Archived works ==
- The Discography of American Historical Recordings catalog at the University of California - Santa Barbara includes several recordings by Mike Danzi with Wilbur Sweatman and his Acme Syncopators from 1924.

== See also ==
Jazz
Jazz Age
Big band
