= Paul Godwin =

Violinist and orchestra leader (1902–1982)

- Born: 28 March 1902; Sosnowitz, Russian Empire (now Poland)
- Died: 9 December 1982 (aged 80); Driebergen, Netherlands
- Occupations: Violinist and orchestra leader

Paul Godwin (1902–1982) was a violinist and the leader of a popular German dance orchestra in the 1920s and 30s.

== Biography ==
Paul Godwin (b. Pinchas Goldfein) was born on 28 March 1902 in Sosnowitz (Russian Empire; now Poland). Early recordings on the POLYPHON label gave the name "Tanz-Orchester Goldfein". He studied the violin at the Warsaw Conservatory under Stanisław Barcewicz.

At the age of 20 he formed his own dance band in Berlin. Between 1926 and 1933 his orchestra Tanz-Orchester Paul Godwin recorded a many records for European labels, namely Berliner Gramophone. The band also backed many singers recording at the time and performed in various styles including foxtrots, waltzes, tangos, polkas. With his full orchestra as well as the "Paul Godwin-Trio" or "Paul Godwin Quartet", he occasionally performed classical pieces. Due to their broad repertoire, his orchestra recorded under various monikers including Tanz-Orchester Godwin, Paul Godwin's Jazz Symphoniker, Paul Godwin-Ensemble, Paul Godwin and sein Weekend-Orchester etc. In 1929–1933 he pivoted to film soundtracks, providing soundtracks for many UFA motion pictures.

Paul Godwin and his orchestras experienced wide in Europe at the time; reports have estimated that he sold nine million records between 1923 and 1933.

In early 1933 Paul Godwin moved to the Netherlands where he remained for the rest of his life. After the war Godwin formed a classical violin trio with which he performed until the 1970s. He died on 9 December 1982 in Driebergen in the Netherlands.

== Discography ==
=== CDs ===
- 1999 Mélodie, "Punch" et Fantaisie (ILD 642187|France)
- 2004 Die Goldene Ära Deutscher Tanzorchester: Paul Godwin (JUBE 15012|Germany)

=== 78 rpm Records (1926–1933) ===
==== 1926 ====
- Der Blusenkauf / Alles weg'n die Leut' (Polydor 20765 / with Otto Reutter)
- Berlin ist ja so groß / Nehm'n Sie 'n Alten (Polydor 20766 / with Reutter)
- Kinder, Kinder, was sind heut' für Zeiten / Es geht mir in jeder Hinsicht immer besser (Polydor 20767 / with Reutter)
- Der Michel wird nicht klüger durch den Krieg / Sei nicht blöd' (Polydor 20768 / with Reutter)
- Wie reizend sind die Frauen / Ick wundere mir ber jarnischt mehr (Polydor 20769 / with Reutter)
- Gräme dich nicht / Aber der Mann (Polydor 20770 / with Reutter)

==== 1927 ====
- Oh Frühling, wie bist du schon / Mohnblumen
- Waren Sie schon in Elberfeld / Ich hab' mein Herz in Heidelberg (Grammophon 19419)
- Hier Schlager, wer dort? Lindemann 1 / Hier Schlager, wer dort? Lindemann 2 (Grammophon 19483)
- Am Rüdesheimer Schloß steht eine Linde / Oh Pimpinella (Grammophon 19622)
- Hochzeitszug in Liliput / Schmetterlings-Intermezzo (Grammophon 19660)
- Rigoletto Fantasie: 1. Teil / 2. Teil (Grammophon 19672)
- Der Fremdenführer / Fideles Wien (Grammophon 19758)
- Plappermäulchen / Schmeichelkätzchen, Characterstücke v. Eilenberg (Polydor 19841)
- Wandere mein Herzchen / Zottelbar ach Zottelbar, beide aus Optte 'Der Orlow' v. Bruno Granichstaedten (Grammophon 20247)
- Im Reiche Der Indra 1 / Im Reiche Der Indra 2 (Grammophon 20450)
- An der schonen, blauen Donau / Uber den Wellen (Grammophon 20530)
- Sag du, sag du zu mir, Einlage zu: 'Der Hampelmann', Optte von Gustav Beer / Komm wilde Rose von Santa Fe (Grammophon 20940)
- Les Patineurs / Die Schlittschuhlaufer. Walzer von Emil Waldteufel / Estudiantina (Grammophon 21003)
- Der Voglein Abendlied / Still wie die Nacht (Grammophon 21013)
- Zwei rote Rosen, ein zarter Kuß / Sehnsucht (Grammophon 21028)
- Heut war ich bei der Frieda / Die schonsten Beine von Berlin (Grammophon 21089)
- Marionetten-Brautzug (Characterstück von Otto Rathke!) / Polo Spiele (Grammophon 21176)
- Trink Bruderlein, trink / Mondnacht auf der Alster (Grammophon 21213)

==== 1928 ====
- Einmal man sagt sich adieu / Prosit Gypsy
- Donna Vatra / Bei uns um die Gedächtniskirche rum
- Ich bin natürlich (Polydor 21258)
- My blue heaven (Blauer Himmel) / Kokolores
- Wenn in Werder die Kirschen blüh'n / Ein Grund zum Trinken (Grammophon 21442)
- Chinesische Strassenserenade / Japanischer Laternentanz (Grammophon 21465)
- Es ist nichts Halbes, es ist nichts Ganzes / Das ist leicht, das ist schwer (Polydor 21467 / with Reutter)
- Mit der Uhr in der Hand / Mein Theaterrepertoire (Polydor 21468 / with Reutter)
- Loblied auf die Frauen von heute / O du liebes deutsches Gretchen (Polydor 21469 / with Reutter)
- Mir hab'n se als geheilt entlassen – Vortrag eines Idioten / Phantasie ist jederzeit schöner als die Wirklichkeit (Polydor 21470 / with Reutter)
- In der Einsamkeit / Einmal im Jahr (Polydor 21471 / with Reutter)
- Bevor du sterbst / Und dadurch gleicht sich alles wieder aus (Polydor 21472 / with Reutter)
- Klange aus der Heimat / Lieb Mutterchen (Grammophon 21701)
- Heinzelmännchens Wachtparade / Dornrös'chens Brautfahrt (Grammophon 21710)
- Du bist als Kind zu heiß gebadet worden / Noch 'ne Lage Cognac her (Grammophon 21774)
- Ich kusse Ihre Hand Madame / Wer weiß ob deine Augen lügen (Grammophon 21785)
- Meine Amerikareise (1. Teil) / Meine Amerikareise (2. Teil) (Grammophon 21875 / with Weiß Ferdl)
- In einer kleinen Konditorei / Ich weiß schon langst dass du mich heimlich lieb hast (Grammophon 21953)
- Flammend rote Rosen / Verzeih mir und sei wieder gut! (Grammophon 22029)
- Tränen weint jede Frau so gern / Wenn du einmal dein Herz verschenkst (Grammophon 22168)
- Lass' mich dein Herz in Rosen winden / Ja, das ist schön (Grammophon 22171)

==== 1929 ====
- Es gibt eine Frau die dich niemals vergißt / Was weisst denn du wie ich verliebt bin (Grammophon 22201)
- Das Lied von der Wunderbar
- Ein Liebesmärchen (Polydor 22326)
- Blutrote Rosen / Ob Du glüklich bist (Sweet Sue – Just You) (Grammophon 22412)
- Wen in Venezia die Tauben schlafen / Ich hol’ dir vom Himmel das Blau (Polydor 22419)
- Schöner Gigolo / Das Lied der Liebe hat eine süße Melodie (Grammophon 22602)
- Ich betrüg dich nur aus Liebe (Grammophon 22622)
- Mosaik 1 / Mosaik 2 Potpourri v. Carl Zimmer (Grammophon 22702)
- Rosen und Frau'n. Tango / Wenn man verliebt ist. Tango (Polydor 22028)
- Eine kleine Frau fehlt dir im Frūhling

==== 1930 ====
- Warst du mir treu / Schlaf ein, mein kleines Sonnenkind (Grammophon 22945)
- Denkst du noch an mich / Warst du mir treu [Filme] (Grammophon 22990)
- O Donna Clara (Grammophon 23036)
- Liebeswalzer / Du bist das süßeste Mädel der Welt (Grammophon 23 041)
- Wien, du Stadt der Lieder / Ohne dich kann ich nicht leben (Grammophon 23 052 / with Max Hansen)
- Mickey Mouse (Polydor 23176)
- Tango auf Tango / Tango-Potpourri (Grammophon 23269)
- Tango auf Tango 1 / Tango auf Tango 2 (Grammophon 23270)
- Lotosblumen / Vineta-Glocken (Grammophon 23323)
- Ja so ein Madel / Good Night (Grammophon 23360)
- In Paris, in Paris sind die Mädels so süss / Ohne Liebe ist das Leben wie ein Auto ohne Benzin (Grammophon 23478)
- Ein Liebelei so nebenbei / Kind dein Mund ist Musik [Sandor] (Grammophon 23719)
- Hallo, Rumänia! / Hallo, Rumania! / Hola Rumania! (Polydor 3017 BR II - 23521 - C 40186)

==== 1931 ====
- Die Musik und der Tanz und die Nacht / In Santa Lucia (Grammophon 23979 / with Leo Monosson)

==== 1932 ====
- Mitternachts-Walzer / Neapolitanische Nächte (Grammophon 1138)
- Johann Strauss Polka (Polydor 24998)
- Südseenacht, hast mir einstmals das Glück gebracht / Träume mein Baby
- Wir kurbeln an 1 / Wir kurbeln an 2
- Meier-Foxtrott / Wenn am Sonntagabend die Dorfmusik spielt

==== 1933 ====
- Mustalainen (Polydor 25114)
