= Stuff Combe =

Swiss jazz drummer

Etienne Stephen Jean Gustave "Stuff" Combe (March 12, 1924 in Bern – December 27, 1986 in Morges) was a Swiss jazz drummer.

Combe initially pursued schooling in art during World War II, but ultimately decided on a career in music instead. He played in Switzerland in the 1940s with Philippe Brun, Eddie Brunner, Ernst Hollerhagen, and Hazy Osterwald. In the 1950s he traveled widely throughout Europe and played frequently with visiting American musicians; he also recorded with Paul Kuhn and Fats Sadi near the end of the decade. In 1957 he began playing with Kurt Edelhagen, an association that would continue into the mid-1960s. He formed his own large ensemble in Geneva in 1966, and the following year worked with the Radio Suisse Romande jazz band. He was Lucky Thompson's drummer during Thompson's 1969 Swiss tour. In the 1970s he worked with Francy Boland and Benny Bailey, and played in the western United States with Groupe Instrumental Romand. He also wrote a treatise on percussion improvisation.
