= Alix Combelle =

- Born: 1 June 1912; Paris, France
- Died: 2 March 1978 (aged 65) Mantes-la-Jolie, France
- Genres: Gypsy jazz, swing
- Occupations: Musician, bandleader, arranger
- Instruments: Clarinet, tenor saxophone
- Years active: 1930s–1940
- Label: Swing
- Formerly of: Gregor, Arthur Briggs, Michel Warlop, Ray Ventura, Jazz de Paris

Alix Combelle (15 June 1912 – 26 February 1978) was a French swing saxophonist, clarinetist, and bandleader. He recorded often with Django Reinhardt and the Quintette du Hot Club de France.

== Career ==
A native of Paris, his father was François Combelle, who played classical saxophone with the Band of the Republican Guard. Alix Combelle played drums in the late 1920s. In the early 1930s he played clarinet and saxophone in theater pit orchestras in Paris. He was a member of a bands led by Gregor (Krikor Kelekian), Arthur Briggs, Michel Warlop, Guy Paquinet, and Ray Ventura. He worked with visiting American musicians such as Benny Carter, Adelaide Hall, Coleman Hawkins, Freddy Johnson, and Danny Polo. He was a member of Bill Coleman's band when it included Argentinian swing guitarist Oscar Aleman. He performed with French singers such as Charles Trenet and Jean Sablon and recorded with Philippe Brun. In the 1940s he led the band Jazz de Paris. His son, Philippe, was a drummer.

== Discography ==
Album	Year	Label
Alix Combelle 1935-1940	1935—1940	Classics
Alix Combelle 1940-1941	1940—1941	Classics
Alix Combelle 1942-1943	1942—1943	Classics
The Swinging Mister Alix: 1937–1942	1937—1942	EPM Musique
Django Reinhardt Album	Year	Label
Rare Django	1928—1938	Disques Swing
Freddy Johnson Album	Year	Label
Freddy Johnson 1933-1939	1933—1939	Classics
Coleman Hawkins Albums	Year	Label
Coleman Hawkins 1934-1937	1934—1937	Classics
The Hawk in Europe	1934—1937	ASV/Living Era
Coleman Hawkins 1937-1939	1937—1939	Classics
Bill Coleman Albums	Year	Label
Bill Coleman 1936-1938	1936—1938	Classics
Bill Coleman in Paris	1936—1938	Disques Swing
Benny Carter Album	Year	Label
Benny Carter 1937-1939	1937—1939	Classics
Buck Clayton Album	Year	Label
Buck Clayton in Paris	1949—1953	Vogue
Lionel Hampton Album	Year	Label
The Complete Paris Session (1953)	1953	Vogue
Lionel Hampton in Paris	1953	Everest
Stan Kenton Album	Year	Label
In Paris September 1953	1953	Royal Jazz
Adelaide Hall Album	Year	Label
Crooning Blackbird	1927—1939	EPM Musique
Jean Sablon Album	Year	Label
French Swinging Troubadour	1934—1939	EPM Musique
Michel Warlop Album	Year	Label
Modernistic 1933/1943	1933/1943	EPM Musique
Stephane Grappelli Album	Year	Label
Fit as a Fiddle	1933/1947	EPM Musique
Georges Ulmer Album	Year	Label
Pigalle	1998	EPM Musique
Charles Trénet Album	Year	Label
La Mer	1935—1950	ASV/Living Era
Oscar Alemán Album	Year	Label
Buenos Aires-Paris: 1928-1943	1928—1943	Fremeaux & Associes
Danny Polo Album	Year	Label
The Complete Sets	1935—1939	Retrieval
