= René Weiss =

Swiss jazz trombonist

René Weiss (1900 – August 28, 1984) was a Swiss jazz trombonist. He was born and died in Geneva.

Weiss was classically trained in music, and played early in the 1920s with the Illarez Orchestra and Jean Yatov. After this he relocated to Berlin and played with Dajos Béla, Ben Berlin, Lud Gluskin, Teddy Sinclair, and Marek Weber. Following this he moved to France, where he played with Fred Adison, Guy Paquinet, and Ray Ventura, as well as in the house ensemble for Paris's Paramount Theatre. At the outbreak of World War II, he returned to Switzerland, where he played with Teddy Stauffer during the war.
