= Rio de Gregori =

Swiss jazz pianist (1919–1987)

- Born: September 22, 1919; Zürich, Switzerland
- Origin: Swiss
- Died: May 22, 1987 (aged 67) Munich, Germany
- Genres: Jazz
- Occupations: Pianist, composer
- Instrument: Piano
- Years active: 1939–1987

Rio de Gregori (22 September 1919 in Zürich – 22 May 1987 in Munich) was a Swiss jazz pianist.

De Gregori first started to play the piano at the age of 7. His parents had aspirations that he would become a classical pianist, but he performed professionally as a jazz musician. He worked with of Willy Mac Allen (1939–1940), James Boucher (1940–1941), Jo Grandjean (1942) and René Weiss (until 1944). During the war he played with Fred Böhler until 1945 when he founded a big band of his own which included Flavio Ambrosetti and Stuff Combe.

When his band broke up, he still worked as both a trio and soloist and he managed a bar in Ascona, Switzerland. He settled, later, in Munich and opened a night club there, Bar Ascona, and called himself Rio Gregory. He composed many songs with the German singer and songwriter Suzanne Doucet and they performed together at festivals, radio stations and on German TV. Their song "Bunter Drachen" was featured in the 2015 Guy Ritchie movie The Man from U.N.C.L.E.
