= Hazy Osterwald =

Swiss jazz bandleader (1922–2012)

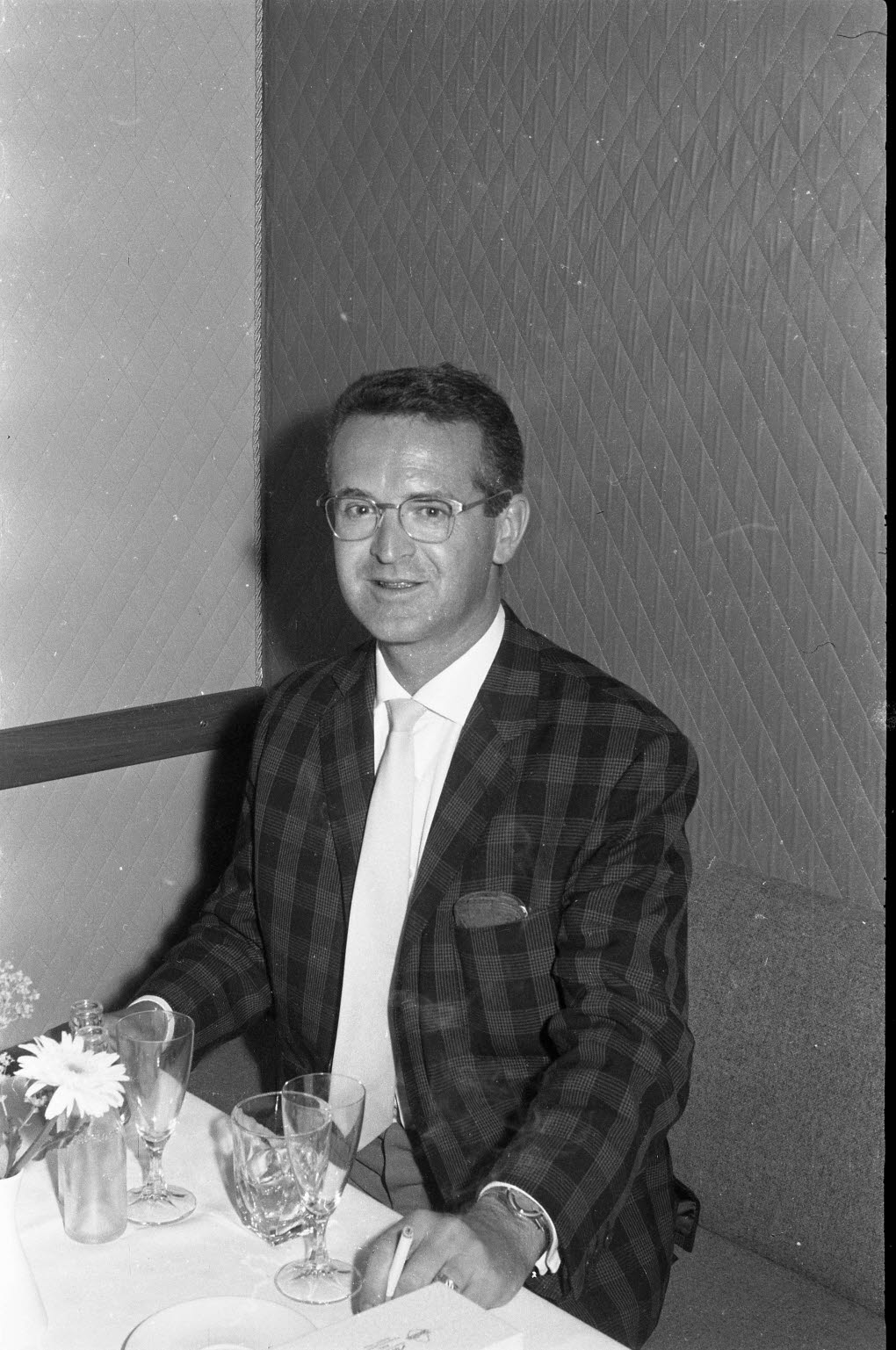
- Osterwald in 1963

Background information
- Birth name: Rolf Osterwald
- Born: 18 February 1922 Bern, Switzerland
- Died: 26 February 2012 (aged 90) Lucerne, Switzerland
- Genres: Jazz
- Occupations: Bandleader; musician
- Instruments: Trumpet; vibraphone; piano

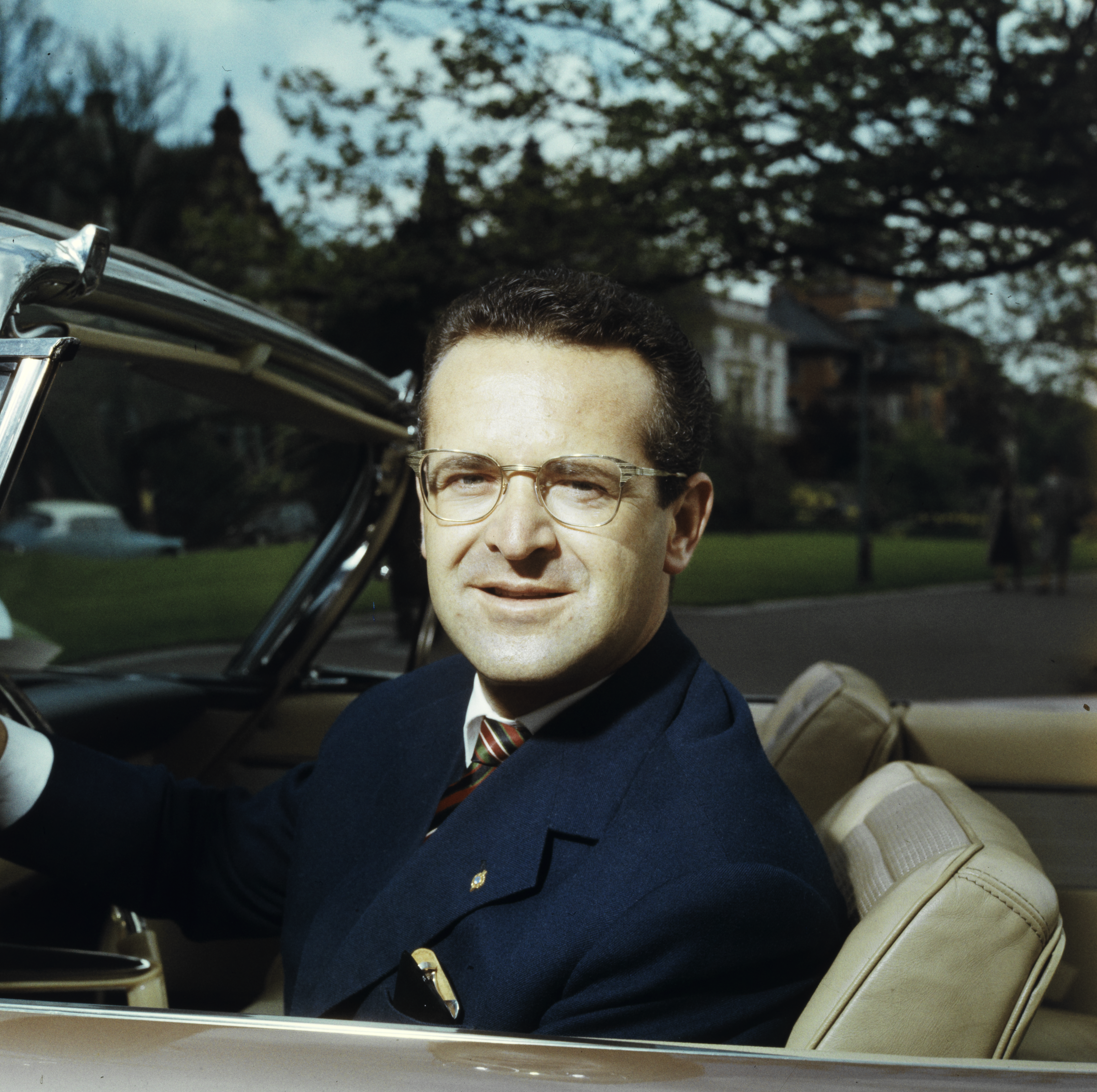
Hazy Osterwald

Rolf Osterwald (February 18, 1922 – February 26, 2012), better known as Hazy Osterwald, was a Swiss jazz bandleader, trumpeter, and vibraphonist.

Osterwald began his career as a pianist. He arranged for Fred Böhler in the late 1930s and joined him as a trumpeter in 1941; around this time he also worked with Edmond Cohanier, Philippe Brun, Bob Huber, Eddie Brunner and Teddy Stauffer. He led his own ensemble starting in 1944, recording through the 1970s, with sidemen including Ernst Höllerhagen and Werner Dies. In the late 1940s he recorded with Gil Cuppini and played at the Paris Jazz Fair with Sidney Bechet and Charlie Parker.

Osterwald led the house band at the Red Onion, an Aspen eatery, in the early 1970s. He died in 2012 at age 90.
