= Ernst Höllerhagen =

- A portrait of Höllerhagen, with note to Hazy Osterwald, calling him Höllerhagen's best friend

Background information
- Born: 5 October 1912; Barmen, Germany
- Died: 11 July 1956 (aged 43) Interlaken, Switzerland
- Genre: Jazz
- Occupation: Musician
- Instruments: Violin; clarinet; saxophone

Ernst Höllerhagen (October 5, 1912 in Barmen – July 11, 1956 in Interlaken) was a German jazz reedist.

== Career ==
Höllerhagen played violin as a child. At the age of 13, he played in live orchestras accompanying silent films. In 1929, he trained as a clarinetist at the Cologne University of Music and played in dance orchestras. In 1930, he played clarinet and alto saxophone with Max Tichauer and Sam Wooding. In 1931, he played with Bruno Miller. In 1932, he played with Jacques Alban and was praised by critics as the best saxophonist in Germany, dubbed the European Benny Goodman. Höllerhagen held Goodman in high esteem as a professional role model. After seeing Höllerhagen perform at a concert in Copenhagen, Goodman himself would later praise Höllerhagen as the best clarinetist Goodman had heard in Europe.

Throughout the 1930s, he played with Dutch bands including those with Melle Weersma, Jack Hylton, Marek Weber and John Ouwerx, played with the German band Goldene Sieben, and also worked with Kurt Engel, Coleman Hawkins (1936), Kurt Hohenberger, Juan Llosas, and Teddy Stauffer (1939).

He continued playing regularly in the 1940s, both with his own ensembles and as a sideman for Philippe Brun, Eddie Brunner, Willie Lewis, and Hazy Osterwald. During World War II, he moved to Switzerland and joined Lewis' band. He later set up his own band with former members of Stauffer's orchestra, from its rhythm section: Buddy Bertinat (piano), Gene Favre (bass) and Polly Guggisberg (drums). From 1947 until his death in 1956, he played with Osterwald.

In 1949, he performed in Osterwald's sextet at a jazz festival in Paris, France called the Festival International 1949 de Jazz. There, he met Charlie Parker. He also submitted recordings with Lewis and Hawkins. Höllerhagen described his 1936 meeting with Hawkins in Switzerland as his most important professional encounter in the music industry. In total, he recorded more than 550 tracks with Swiss record label Elite Special.

== Personal life ==
Like many jazz musicians to live in Nazi Germany, Höllerhagen held disdain for Adolf Hitler and Nazism. He was once imprisoned by the Gestapo for several days for making a joke mocking the Nazi salute. He would later migrate to Switzerland to evade Nazi oppression.

He married and had a daughter. However, their marriage fell apart. His wife divorced him and left with their daughter to move to the United States.

Höllerhagen suffered from depression as well as medical problems including a heart attack, nerve inflammation, and partial facial paralysis. Distress from these conditions influenced him to commit suicide by hanging.
