= Rosita Serrano =

Chilean singer

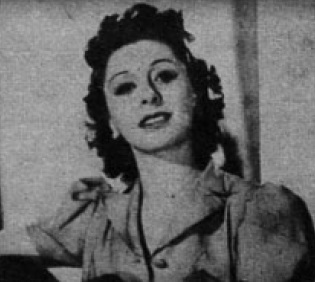
- Serrano in 1941

Background information
- Born: María Martha Esther Aldunate del Campo; 10 June 1912; Quilpué, Chile
- Died: 6 April 1997 (aged 84) Santiago, Chile
- Occupation: Singer

Rosita Serrano (born María Martha Esther Aldunate del Campo, 10 June 1912 – 6 April 1997) was a Chilean singer who had her biggest success in Nazi Germany between the 1930s and the early 1940s. Because of her bell-like voice and pitch-perfect whistling she received the nickname Chilenische Nachtigall (Chilean Nightingale).

== Life ==
Rosita Serrano was born in Quilpué, Chile on 10 June 1912. Her father Héctor Aldunate was in the diplomatic service. With her mother Sofía del Campo who was a popular opera singer she moved to Europe in the early 1930s. Initially they lived in Portugal and France but by 1936 they moved to Berlin.

Serrano had her first successes in the Wintergarten and the Metropol Theater where she performed Chilean folk songs. During that time she was discovered by German composer Peter Kreuder who arranged for her to get a record contract at the German Telefunken. Thereafter she performed in the German language including popular songs like Roter Mohn (Red poppy), Schön die Musik (Beautiful Music), Küß mich, bitte, bitte, küß mich (Kiss me, please, please kiss me), Und die Musik spielt dazu (And the Music plays to it), Der Onkel Jonathan (The uncle Jonathan), and Der kleine Liebesvogel (The little love bird). By 1938 she received roles in the revue films Es leuchten die Sterne (1938), Bel Ami (1939), Der vierte kommt nicht (1939), Die kluge Schwiegermutter (1939), Herzensfreud – Herzensleid (1940) and Anita und der Teufel (1941). Her appearance in Herzensfreud – Herzensleid was in a co-starring role with actor Paul Hoerbiger. Between film shoots, she went on tour with two popular dance orchestras, one led by Kurt Hohenberger and the other by Teddy Stauffer. Due to the intercession of Minister Joseph Goebbels, she got gigs in the radio show Wunschkonzert für die Wehrmacht (musical request programme for the Wehrmacht). In 1940 she recorded the very popular song La Paloma, heard throughout Germany.

Her voice style was mainly operatic coloratura soprano with a deep, fast vibrato. She added frequent embellishments such as soaring arpeggiation and melisma. Some songs were recorded with a few words whispered or spoken, and she occasionally emphasized words with a gritty, growling jazz style reminiscent of African-American blues singer Ethel Waters. She was a pitch-perfect whistler in the manner of Bing Crosby. The songs she recorded in German and Spanish varied from folk to pop, including flamenco, rumba, tango and mambo.

In 1943 while on tour in Sweden, Serrano was accused by Germany of being a spy—she had donated a benefit performance to Jewish refugees. Rather than returning to Germany to be arrested, she traveled to Chile. Her songs were subsequently banned in Nazi Germany. Serrano attempted a tour in the United States, but her German repertoire was not popular. She appeared on The Ed Sullivan Show in 1950, but little came of the publicity. In 1951, she went to West Germany to take part in the film Schwarze Augen (Dark Eyes), in which she played a Cuban singer, and the next year she sang in the film Saison in Salzburg. Beyond these appearances, she saw little success in Germany, her comeback attempt ending with a poorly received tour with Kurt Hohenberger in 1957.

In her native Chile, where she spent the last years of her life, the public never forgave her for performing in Nazi Germany. She died in poverty in Santiago on 6 April 1997.

== Legacy ==
Serrano's performance of La Paloma was used in the 1981 film Das Boot by Wolfgang Petersen, and in the 1993 production of the film The House of the Spirits, after the novel by Chilean author Isabel Allende.

== Selected filmography ==
- The Fourth Is Not Coming (1939)
- Dark Eyes (1951)
