= Arthur Briggs =

Arthur Briggs may refer to:

- Arthur Briggs (musician) (1901–1991), British-Caribbean jazz trumpeter
- Arthur Briggs (rugby) (1867–1943), rugby union footballer of the 1890s for England, and Bradford F.C.
- Arthur E. Briggs (1881–1969), Los Angeles politician
- Arthur Briggs (footballer) (1900–1987), English footballer who played for Hull City, Tranmere Rovers and Swindon Town
- Arthur Briggs (Home and Away), a fictional character on the Australian soap opera Home and Away
- Arthur W. Briggs (1884–1949), American football, basketball, baseball and track and field coach
