= Lucien Moraweck =

American jazz musician

Lucien Moraweck (May 24, 1901, Belfort – October 20, 1973, San Diego, California) was a French jazz pianist.

== Biography ==
Moraweck studied music formally at the Paris Conservatoire in his youth, but began devoting his attention primarily to jazz starting around 1924. He played alongside Edmond Cohanier in Georges Marion's Swiss band in 1925 and with Paul Gason's ensemble in Belgium. Through the end of the 1920s he played with a number of dance orchestras and with the ensembles of Lud Gluskin and Gregor. He later became conductor of the Jazz du Poste Parisien, and played with Michel Warlop and Wal-Berg in the mid-1930s.

In 1934, he emigrated to the United States, where he worked again with Gluskin; the pair were nominated for an Academy Award for Best Original Score for their soundtrack to The Man in the Iron Mask. With Gluskin, he contributed to the radio series Suspense as the series composer. According to IMDB, Lucien continued to compose and arrange music for cinema and television until the mid 1960s, with his last performance being in 1970.
