= 1986–87 in English football =

Football in England
- Season: 1986–87

Men's football
- First Division: Everton
- Second Division: Derby County
- Third Division: AFC Bournemouth
- Fourth Division: Northampton Town
- Conference: Scarborough
- FA Cup: Coventry City
- Associate Members' Cup: Mansfield town
- League Cup: Arsenal
- Charity Shield: Shared between Everton and Liverpool

The 1986–87 season was the 107th season of competitive football in England.

== Diary of the season ==
1 July 1986 – After one season at Everton, Gary Lineker departs to Barcelona of Spain in a £2.75 million deal, where he will play alongside former Manchester United striker Mark Hughes in a side managed by Terry Venables. Ian Rush agrees a £3.2 million transfer to Juventus of Italy in a record fee for a British player, but will remain at Liverpool on loan for a season.

2 July 1986 – Rangers sign Norwich City goalkeeper Chris Woods for £600,000.

3 July 1986 – Coventry City sign striker Keith Houchen from Scunthorpe United for £60,000.

7 July 1986 – Two big First Division clubs buy young players from smaller clubs as they prepare to build for the future. Everton sign 20-year-old winger Neil Adams from Stoke City for £150,000, while Tottenham Hotspur sign 21-year-old defender Mitchell Thomas from Luton Town for £233,000.

18 July 1986 – Sir Stanley Rous, chairman of The Football Association from 1934 to 1961, dies aged 91.

25 July 1986 – Ipswich Town, relegated to the Second Division at the end of last season, sell England international defender Terry Butcher to Rangers, managed by former Liverpool midfielder Graeme Souness, in a £700,000 deal – a record for a Scottish club.

29 July 1986 – Middlesbrough are wound up in the High Court due to debts in excess of £1million, but have yet to be expelled from the Football League and may yet be included in the first round draw for the Football League Cup.

30 July 1986 – Wolverhampton Wanderers win a High Court appeal against their winding-up order, enabling them to compete in the Fourth Division campaign – the first time they have played at this level. Meanwhile, Middlesbrough are also reprieved, but the bailiffs have locked them out of Ayresome Park and they are expected to play at least one home game at Hartlepool United's ground.

31 July 1986 – Liverpool pay £200,000 for Sunderland defender Barry Venison.

1 August 1986 – Aston Villa sign midfielder Neale Cooper from Aberdeen for £350,000.

5 August 1986 – Wolverhampton Wanderers are saved from bankruptcy after Wolverhampton Council and the Asda supermarket chain agree to pay off the club's £3million debts.

7 August 1986 – David Seaman, goalkeeper at relegated Birmingham City, opts to remain in the First Division and signs for Queens Park Rangers for £225,000.

8 August 1986 – Rival gangs of Manchester United and West Ham United hooligans are involved in violence on a Sealink ferry bound for Amsterdam, resulting in dozens of arrests, sparking fears that the ongoing ban on English football clubs in European competition could be extended to friendlies between English and foreign clubs.

11 August 1986 – Sheffield Wednesday pay £200,000 for 18-year-old Barnsley striker David Hirst.

16 August 1986 – The first Merseyside derby of the season finishes honours even, in the 1986 FA Charity Shield at Wembley Stadium.

20 August 1986 – Tottenham Hotspur sign Dundee United and Scotland defender Richard Gough for £700,000.

21 August 1986 – Everton pay a club record £1million to sign the 24-year-old Norwich City defender Dave Watson.

23 August 1986 – On the first day of the First Division season, Wimbledon's first match in the top division ends in a 3–1 defeat to Manchester City. Southampton record the biggest win of the day, 5–1 against Queens Park Rangers. Champions Liverpool beat Newcastle United 2–0, and Arsenal beat Manchester United 1–0. Colin Clarke scores a hat-trick for Southampton on his debut in a 5–1 home win over QPR.

25 August 1986 – West Ham United win 3–2 at Manchester United, with Frank McAvennie scoring twice.

27 August 1986 – Luton Town ban away fans from the club's Kenilworth Road ground.

30 August 1986 – Tottenham Hotspur go top of the First Division on goal difference with a 1–0 home win over Manchester City. They are level on points with Liverpool, who beat Arsenal 2–1 at Anfield, and West Ham United, who are held to a goalless draw at Oxford United. Manchester United are still looking for their first point of the season after losing 1–0 at home to Charlton Athletic.

31 August 1986 – Tottenham Hotspur finish August as First Division leaders under new manager David Pleat, level on points with Liverpool and West Ham United, while the bottom two places in the league are occupied by Manchester United and Aston Villa, who have yet to gain a point this season. Birmingham City and Hull City occupy the top two places in the Second Division, while the next three places are occupied by Oldham Athletic, Crystal Palace and Blackburn Rovers.

2 September 1986 – Wimbledon, Football League members for just 10 seasons, go top of the league with a 1–0 away win over Charlton Athletic. Oldham Athletic go top of the Second Division with a 1–0 win over Ipswich Town at Portman Road.

4 September 1986 – Watford sign Everton midfielder Kevin Richardson for £225,000.

6 September 1986 – Manchester United, bottom of the table, claim their first point of the First Division campaign with a 1–1 draw at Leicester City. Liverpool beat West Ham United 5–2 at Upton Park. Wimbledon stay on top with a 1–0 win at Watford. In the Second Division, Blackburn Rovers climb into second place with a 6–1 win over Sunderland at Ewood Park.

9 September 1986 – England under-21s draw 1–1 with Sweden, with Arsenal defender Tony Adams scoring their goal.

13 September 1986 – Bryan Robson makes his first league appearance since April when he returns from a shoulder injury to help Manchester United record their first league win of the season at the fifth attempt as they beat Southampton 5–1 at Old Trafford and climb off the bottom of the First Division. Nottingham Forest go top with a 6–0 home win over Aston Villa.

14 September 1986 – Aston Villa sack manager Graham Turner after just over two years at the helm.

16 September 1986 – Gordon Hill, the 32-year-old former Manchester United and England winger, becomes a high-profile new signing for Conference side Northwich Victoria, managed by former United striker Stuart Pearson.

20 September 1986 – Leeds United hooligans overturn and immolate a fish and chip van at Odsal Stadium, the temporary home of Bradford City. Nottingham Forest score six for the second League match in succession when they thrash Chelsea 6–2 at Stamford Bridge. Nigel Clough and Garry Birtles both scores hat-trick. Newly promoted Norwich City go second with a 4–1 win at Aston Villa. A nine-goal thriller at Leeds Road sees Huddersfield Town beat Oldham Athletic 5–4 in the Second Division.

21 September 1986 – The pressure mounts on Manchester United manager Ron Atkinson after a 3–1 defeat to Everton at Goodison Park, with his side still second from bottom with one win and four points from their first seven league games.

22 September 1986 – Luton Town are banned from this season's League Cup for refusing to lift their ban on away fans. Meanwhile, Aston Villa appoint Billy McNeill as manager from Manchester City, who replace him with Jimmy Frizzell.

23 September 1986 – Liverpool defeat Fulham 10–0 in the first leg of their second round tie in the League Cup.

24 September 1986 – When Nottingham Forest play Brighton & Hove Albion in a second round League Cup match, Forest defender Stuart Pearce's brother Ray was one of the linesmen. Pearce had no idea that his brother was officiating until he saw him at the start of the match.

27 September 1986 – Aston Villa's first league match under Billy McNeill ends in a 3–3 draw with Liverpool at Anfield after the hosts come from behind twice to equalise. Nottingham Forest remain top with a 1–0 win over Arsenal at the City Ground.

28 September 1986 – Manchester United's dismal start to the season continues as they lose 1–0 at home to Chelsea in the league at Old Trafford – their sixth defeat from their opening eight games. After Kerry Dixon gives Chelsea an early lead, the home side have two penalties saved by goalkeeper Tony Godden.

30 September 1986 – Nottingham Forest are First Division leaders at the end of September, two points ahead of surprise contenders Norwich City and four ahead of Liverpool and Coventry City. Aston Villa still occupy bottom place and Manchester United are second from bottom with just four points so far this campaign. In the Second Division, Oldham Athletic and Portsmouth lead the way, followed by Crystal Palace, Leeds United and Sheffield United.

3 October 1986 – Tottenham Hotspur sign Belgian striker Nico Claesen from Standard Liège for £600,000.

4 October 1986 – Sheffield Wednesday go fourth in the First Division with a 6–1 home win over Oxford United. An all-London clash at Selhurst Park sees Crystal Palace go top of the Second Division with a 2–1 win over Millwall.

6 October 1986 – Luton Town lose an appeal against their expulsion from the League Cup.

11 October 1986 – Newly promoted Norwich City top the league after a 0–0 away draw with Luton Town. Nottingham Forest fall into second after a 3–1 defeat to East Midlands rivals Leicester at Filbert Street. West Ham go fourth with a 5–3 home win over Chelsea. Portsmouth go top of the Second Division with a 2–0 win over Birmingham at Fratton Park.

14 October 1986 – Manchester United sign 18-year-old Irish midfielder Liam O'Brien from Shamrock Rovers for £60,000.

15 October 1986 – England open their 1988 European Championship qualifying campaign with a 3–0 win over Northern Ireland at Wembley.

16 October 1986 – Queens Park Rangers put defender Terry Fenwick on the transfer list at his own request. The former Everton goalkeeper Ted Sagar dies aged 76.

18 October 1986 – Nottingham Forest return to the top of the First Division with a 1–0 home win over Queens Park Rangers. Norwich City surrender top position with a 1–1 draw at home to West Ham United. Liverpool keep up the pressure on the leading pair with a 4–0 home win over Oxford United.

21 October 1986 – Out of favour Manchester United defender John Gidman joins neighbours City on a free transfer.

23 October 1986 – Norwich City sign 22-year-old goalkeeper Bryan Gunn for £150,000 from Aberdeen.

25 October 1986 – Mike Newell, a former Liverpool trainee, scores a hat-trick in Luton Town's 4–1 league win over the double winners at Kenilworth Road. Colin Clarke scores his second hat-trick for Southampton in a 3–2 away win over Leicester City. Nottingham Forest remain top despite losing 2–1 to Oxford United at the Manor Ground as both Norwich City and Liverpool lose, while Everton go third with a 3–2 home win over Watford.

26 October 1986 – The only competitive action of the day is the Manchester derby at Maine Road, which ends in a 1–1 draw. City climb off the bottom of the table on goal difference at the expense of Newcastle United.

29 October 1986 – In the third round of the League Cup, Fourth Division club Cardiff City upset First Division Chelsea while Second Division Ipswich Town are knocked out by Fourth Division team Cambridge United.

31 October 1986 – October ends with Nottingham Forest back on top of the First Division, one point ahead of Norwich City and two ahead of Everton and Arsenal. Manchester United and Aston Villa have both climbed out of the bottom two, ahead of Newcastle United, Manchester City and Chelsea. Portsmouth are now leaders of the Second Division, a point ahead of Oldham Athletic. Leeds United, Plymouth Argyle and Sunderland occupy the playoff places.

1 November 1986 – Paul Walsh scores a hat-trick for Liverpool in their 6–2 home league win over Norwich City. Nottingham Forest remain top of the table with a 3–2 home win over Sheffield Wednesday. Arsenal go second with a 2–0 away win over Charlton Athletic. Manchester United draw 1–1 at home to Coventry City and remain fourth from bottom. Wimbledon's return to form continues with a 2–1 win over Tottenham Hotspur at White Hart Lane.

4 November 1986 – Southampton beat Manchester United 4–1 in a League Cup third round replay at The Dell, with the 18-year-old striker Matt Le Tissier scoring his first two goals for the club. The result increases speculation that United manager Ron Atkinson's dismissal is imminent.

6 November 1986 – Ron Atkinson is sacked after five years as manager of Manchester United, and Aberdeen's Alex Ferguson is appointed as his replacement. Out of favour West Ham United striker Paul Goddard joins Newcastle United for £450,000.

8 November 1986 – Manchester United lose 2–0 to Oxford United in their first game under the management of Alex Ferguson. Liverpool move to the top of the First Division after a 3–1 win at Queens Park Rangers, leading on goals scored after Nottingham Forest lose 1–0 at Coventry City.

11 November 1986 – England under-21s begin their European Championship qualifying campaign with a 1–1 draw with Yugoslavia at London Road, Peterborough. Their only goal comes from Brighton & Hove Albion striker Terry Connor on his debut at this level.

12 November 1986 – England beat Yugoslavia 2–0 at Wembley in their second World Cup qualifier.

13 November 1986 – Crystal Palace sign Leicester City striker Mark Bright for £75,000.

15 November 1986 – The FA Cup first round sees non-league sides Caernarfon Town and Telford United both beat Football League opposition, while several ties between non-league and Football League opposition end in draws. Non-league Fareham Town lose 7–2 to Third Division promotion contenders AFC Bournemouth at Dean Court. Arsenal go top of the First Division with a 4–0 win at Southampton. Luton Town climb into fourth place and are just two points off the top of the table after beating Nottingham Forest 4–2 at Kenilworth Road. West Ham United keep up their title challenge with a 1–0 win over Wimbledon at Plough Lane. A Second Division promotion crunch game at Elland Road sees Oldham Athletic go top of the table with a 2–0 win over Leeds United.

16 November 1986 – Liverpool blow their chance to return to the top of the First Division after being held to a 1–1 draw at home to Sheffield Wednesday.

20 November 1986 – Wimbledon sign the 21-year-old midfielder Vinnie Jones from Conference side Wealdstone for £10,000.

21 November 1986 – Wolverhampton Wanderers continue their rebuilding process and bid for promotion from the Fourth Division by signing midfielder Andy Thompson and striker Steve Bull from neighbours West Bromwich Albion for £35,000 each.

22 November 1986 – Arsenal remain top of the First Division with a 3–0 home win over Manchester City. Nottingham Forest keep up the pressure in second place with a 3–2 home win over Wimbledon. Chelsea, title contenders last season, fall into second from bottom place with a 3–1 home defeat to bottom club Newcastle United. Leicester City's relegation fears deepen with a 5–1 defeat to Watford at Vicarage Road. A John Sivebaek goal gives Alex Ferguson his first win as Manchester United manager as they beat Queens Park Rangers 1–0 at Old Trafford and climb out of the bottom four. Tottenham Hotspur get back on track with a 4–2 away win over Oxford United.

23 November 1986 – The Merseyside derby at Goodison Park ends in a goalless draw.

26 November 1986 – Jan Molby scores a hat-trick of penalties in Liverpool's 3–1 League Cup quarter-final win over Coventry City at Anfield.

29 November 1986 – Vinnie Jones scores his first goal for Wimbledon in a 1–0 victory over Manchester United at Plough Lane. Arsenal remain top with a 4–0 away win over Aston Villa. Nottingham Forest keep up the pressure with a 3–2 away win over Tottenham Hotspur. Everton keep up the pace with the leaders by beating Manchester City 3–1 at Maine Road.

30 November 1986 – Arsenal finish November as First Division leaders, while fifth placed Luton Town are putting up an unlikely title challenge. Nottingham Forest, Everton, Liverpool and Norwich City are also all within five points of the leaders. Newcastle United are bottom, with Chelsea also struggling in the relegation zone. Oldham Athletic and Portsmouth continue to lead the way in the Second Division, with Plymouth Argyle and Leeds United still occupying the play-off zone, joined by Derby County. The only action of the day sees Newcastle beat West Ham 4–0 on Tyneside to climb from 22nd to 18th in the First Division.

3 December 1986 – The former Southampton and Republic of Ireland winger Austin Hayes dies of lung cancer at the age of 28, three weeks after the illness was diagnosed. He had recently returned from a short spell playing in Sweden, and since leaving Southampton in 1981 had also played for Millwall and Northampton Town.

6 December 1986 – The top three clubs in the First Division – Arsenal, Nottingham Forest and Everton – all record victories. Liverpool's hopes of retaining the title are hit by a 2–0 defeat at Watford. The pressure mounts on Chelsea manager John Hollins after watching his side lose 4–0 at home to Wimbledon.

7 December 1986 – A six-goal thriller at Old Trafford sees Manchester United and Tottenham Hotspur draw 3–3.

9 December 1986 – Liverpool play Celtic in an unofficial 'British Championship' match in the United Arab Emirates. After the match finished 1–1 after 90 minutes, Liverpool win 4–2 on penalties to win the first Dubai Super Cup.

13 December 1986 – Aston Villa come from 3–1 down in the final minutes to draw 3–3 with Manchester United in a First Division clash at Villa Park. Leaders Arsenal draw 1–1 with Norwich City at Carrow Road. Everton's title hopes are hit by a 1–0 away defeat to Luton Town, who climb into fourth place. Manchester City's survival hopes are given a boost with a 3–1 home win over West Ham United.

14 December 1986 – 18 months after the stadium fire that killed 56 spectators, Bradford City return to a revamped Valley Parade. In the First Division, Leicester City climb out of the bottom four with a 2–0 home win over Oxford United. Chelsea are now bottom after losing 3–0 at Liverpool.

20 December 1986 – Arsenal go five points clear at the top with a 3–0 home win over Luton Town. Manchester United's revival continues with a 2–0 home win over Leicester City. Nottingham Forest's drop two points in a goalless draw at home to Southampton. Portsmouth go top of the Second Division by beating Barnsley 2–1 at home, although OldhamA thletic are two points behind them with two games in hand.

21 December 1986 – Tottenham Hotspur sell defender Graham Roberts to Rangers for £450,000. Oldham Athletic return to the top of the Second Division with a 2–1 home win over Bradford City. Promotion contenders Leeds United suffer a 7–2 defeat to Stoke City at the Victoria Ground. Derby County go third and boost their hopes of a second successive promotion by beating Grimsby Town 4–0 at the Baseball Ground.

22 December 1986 – Graeme Souness continues to buy English-based players for Rangers by making a £120,000 move for Doncaster Rovers striker Neil Woods.

23 December 1986 – Tottenham Hotspur sign midfielder Steve Hodge from Aston Villa for £650,000.

26 December 1986 – Manchester United beat Liverpool 1–0 at Anfield. It is United's first away win of the season. Leaders Arsenal drop points in a 1–1 draw at Leicester City, but Nottingham Forest fail to take advantage as they lose 2–1 at Norwich City. Everton win 4–0 at Newcastle United. Tottenham Hotspur climb into fifth place with a 4–0 home win over West Ham United. In the Second Division, Bradford City's first game back at Valley Parade ends in a 1–0 home defeat to Derby County. Portsmouth return to the top of the Second Division with a 3–2 win over Plymouth Argyle at Home Park, as Oldham Athletic surrender their lead of the table after being held to a 2–2 draw by Grimsby Town at Blundell Park.

27 December 1986 – Norwich City win 1–0 away to Manchester United. Arsenal remain in pole position with a 1–0 home win over Southampton. Tottenham Hotspur's erratic league form continues as they lose 4–3 at Coventry City. West Ham United fall into the bottom half of the table with a 3–2 home defeat to Wimbledon. Chelsea halt their dismal form with a 4–1 home win over Aston Villa. In the Second Division, Stoke City keep up the pressure on the pace-setters with a 5–2 win over Sheffield United. A relegation crunch game sees Huddersfield Town beat Bradford City by the same scoreline at Leeds Road. Derby County go top of the table with a 3–2 home win over Barnsley.

28 December 1986 – Charlton Athletic climb off the top of the First Division and jump up five places to 17th with a 5–0 home win over Manchester City. Everton cut Arsenal's lead at the top to four points by beating Leicester City 5–1 at Goodison Park. Nottingham Forest drop more points in the title race with a 2–2 draw at home to Luton Town.

31 December 1986 – The year draws to a close with Arsenal leading the league by four points from Everton. Leicester City are bottom of the table, but are within three points of six other teams. The race for First Division football next season is headed by Portsmouth, while Derby County have moved into second.

1 January 1987 – Arsenal remain four points ahead at the top of the First Division with a 3–1 home win over Wimbledon, as Everton keep up the pressure with a 3–0 home win over Aston Villa. Manchester United's upswing continues with a 4–1 home win over Newcastle United. West Ham United climb back into the top half of the table by beating Leicester City 4–1 at Upton Park. Chelsea continue their recent revival with a 3–1 win over Queens Park Rangers in a West London derby clash at Stamford Bridge.

3 January 1987 – Steve Moran scores a hat-trick in Leicester City's 6–1 home win over Sheffield Wednesday, which lifts the East Midlands side off the bottom of the First Division. Newcastle United, who lose 2–1 at home to Coventry City, now prop up the table. Everton keep up the pressure on Arsenal with a 1–0 win over Queens Park Rangers at Loftus Road.

4 January 1987 – Arsenal beat Tottenham Hotspur 2–1 at White Hart Lane in the North London derby to go four points ahead at the top of the league.

6 January 1987 – Ian Snodin joins Everton for £840,000 from Leeds United.

10 January 1987 – Manchester United beat Manchester City 1–0 in the FA Cup third round at Old Trafford.

11 January 1987 – Nottingham Forest are surprisingly beaten 2–1 by Crystal Palace in the FA Cup third round.

13 January 1987 – Winger Peter Barnes becomes the second Manchester United player to transfer to neighbours City this season when he completes his £30,000 return to the club where he started his career more than a decade ago.

17 January 1987 – Everton and Liverpool both keep up the pressure on leaders Arsenal. Howard Kendall's men beat Sheffield Wednesday 2–0 at Goodison Park, while Kenny Dalglish's defending champions beat Manchester City 1–0 at Maine Road. In the Second Division, Bradford City boost their survival bid with a 4–0 home win over Millwall, whose promotion hopes take a major blow as a result.

18 January 1987 – Chelsea sign 23-year-old defender Steve Clarke from St Mirren for £400,000. The gap at the top of the First Division remains at two points when Arsenal draw 0–0 at home to Coventry City.

19 January 1987 – Portsmouth striker Micky Quinn is found guilty on a double charge of driving while disqualified and receives a 21-day prison sentence.

20 January 1987 – The country's biggest anti-hooliganism police operation sees 26 suspected football hooligans arrested in raids in the West Midlands and Southern England.

23 January 1987 – Liverpool's £250,000 move for West Bromwich Albion defender Derek Statham falls through after the player fails a fitness test.

24 January 1987 – Arsenal lose 2–0 away to Manchester United, their first League defeat since September. Other key games include West Ham United's 3–1 win over Coventry City at Highfield Road, Watford winning by the same scoreline at Oxford United, and Tottenham Hotspur's 3–0 home win over Aston Villa.

25 January 1987 – Everton miss the chance to go top of the First Division by losing 1–0 at Nottingham Forest.

27 January 1987 – Liverpool sign Oxford United striker John Aldridge, 28, for a fee of £750,000 as player-manager Kenny Dalglish ends his search for a new striker ready to take over from Ian Rush, who will leave for Juventus at the end of the season.

28 January 1987 – Luton Town knock holders Liverpool out of the FA Cup with a comprehensive 3–0 victory in the third round second replay at Kenilworth Road.

30 January 1987 – Out-of-favour Arsenal defender Tommy Caton leaves the club after three years and signs for Oxford United in a £100,000 deal.

31 January 1987 – In the FA Cup fourth round, Coventry City win 1–0 away to Manchester United, while Arsenal put six goals past Plymouth Argyle at Highbury. The Gunners remain top of the First Division as the month ends, with Everton and Liverpool their nearest contenders and Nottingham Forest occupying fourth place. Aston Villa have slipped back into the relegation zone, joining Leicester City and Newcastle United. Portsmouth are still top of the Second Division with Derby County in second place. The play-off places are occupied by Oldham Athletic, Ipswich Town and Plymouth Argyle.

5 February 1987 – Watford winger Nigel Callaghan moves to Derby County in a £140,000 deal.

6 February 1987 – UEFA confirms that the ban on English clubs in European competition that arose from the Heysel disaster will continue for at least another season.

7 February 1987 – Everton go top of the First Division with a 3–1 home win over Coventry City. Leicester City climb out of the bottom four with a 3–1 home win over Wimbledon.

14 February 1987 – In a thrilling game between one side challenging for the title and the other battling to avoid relegation, Liverpool beat Leicester City 4–3 at Anfield, with Ian Rush scoring a hat-trick.

18 February 1987 – Gary Lineker scores all four goals as England beat Spain 4–2 in a friendly in Madrid. England under-21s beat Spain 2–1 in a friendly in Burgos, with goals from 19-year-old Arsenal midfielder David Rocastle and 21-year-old West Ham United striker Tony Cottee.

19 February 1987 – Billy McNeill boosts Aston Villa's battle against relegation by paying Everton £300,000 for their striker Warren Aspinall.

21 February 1987 – Third Division Wigan Athletic, in only their ninth season as Football League members, reach the FA Cup quarter-finals for the first time in their history by beating Hull City 3–0 in the fifth round at Springfield Park. Liverpool miss the chance to go level on points at the top of the First Division when they are held to a 2–2 draw at Aston Villa.

22 February 1987 – Title-chasing Everton are knocked out of the FA Cup 3–1 in the fifth round by Wimbledon.

24 February 1987 – Liverpool sign midfielder Nigel Spackman from Chelsea for £400,000.

28 February 1987 – Everton finish February as First Division leaders, but only lead on goal difference over second-placed Liverpool. Arsenal are a point behind with a game in hand. Portsmouth, Derby County, Oldham Athletic, Plymouth Argyle and Ipswich Town continue to lead the way in the Second Division.

1 March 1987 – Plans for a merger between West London rivals Fulham and Queens Park Rangers are scrapped after the Football League vetoed the proposal. Former Arsenal winger Liam Brady returns to England in a £150,000 move to West Ham United from Ascoli of Italy. The Football League Cup semi-final tie between Tottenham and Arsenal goes to a replay after Arsenal win 2–1 at White Hart Lane, following a 1–0 defeat at Highbury in the first leg.

3 March 1987 – England winger John Barnes is put on the transfer list by Watford. Liverpool and Manchester United are among the teams expected to make a bid for the 23-year-old, who first signed for Watford in 1981.

4 March 1987 – Arsenal reach the League Cup Final after a 2–1 replay victory over Tottenham Hotspur. In the league, Aston Villa miss the chance to climb out of the bottom four after Wimbledon hold them to a goalless draw at Villa Park. A clash between the top two clubs in the Second Division at the Baseball Ground sees Derby County draw 0–0 with Portsmouth.

6 March 1987 – Everton sign striker Wayne Clarke from Birmingham City for £300,000. Oldham go second in the Second Division with a 4–0 home win over Reading.

7 March 1987 – Charlton Athletic boost their First Division survival hopes and climb out of the bottom four with a 2–1 home win over London rivals West Ham, who drop to 14th. Chelsea continue their climb to mid-table security with a 1–0 home win over Arsenal, denting the title hopes of George Graham's side. A relegation crunch match at The Dell sees Southampton beat Leicester City 4–0. Bryan Robson scores once and Nicky Reid scores an own goal as Manchester United win the Manchester derby 2–0 at Old Trafford. Liverpool go top of the table with a 2–0 home win over Luton Town. Tottenham Hotspur close in on the top three with a 1–0 home win over Queens Park Rangers. Newcastle United stay bottom of the table but boost their survival hopes with a 2–1 home win over an Aston Villa side who are now second from bottom.

8 March 1987 – Everton squander the chance to return to the top of the table with a 2–1 defeat at Watford.

11 March 1987 – Blackburn Rovers pay Dundee £30,000 for defender Colin Hendry. Leaders Liverpool beat Arsenal 1–0 at Highbury.

12 March 1987 – Oxford United pay a club record £600,000 for Brighton & Hove Albion striker Dean Saunders in a bid to avoid relegation.

14 March 1987 – Coventry City progress to the FA Cup semi-finals for the first time in their history thanks to a 3–0 away win over Sheffield Wednesday in the quarter-finals. Arsenal's hopes of a domestic treble are ended with a 3–1 defeat at home to Watford. In the First Division, Liverpool win 3–1 at Oxford United and Luton Town climb back up to fourth win a 2–1 home win over Manchester United. A Second Division rampage at Selhurst Park sees Crystal Palace beat Birmingham City 6–0.

15 March 1987 – Tottenham Hotspur move closer to a record eighth FA Cup triumph as they eliminate Wimbledon 2–0 at Plough Lane. Wigan Athletic's dreams end with a 2–0 home defeat by Leeds United. For the first time in the history of the FA Cup, all four quarter-final ties have been won by the away team.

17 March 1987 – Crystal Palace, chasing promotion in the Second Division, sign midfielder Alan Pardew for £7,000 from Conference side Yeovil Town.

19 March 1987 – 22-year-old striker Paul Stewart leaves Third Division strugglers Blackpool to sign for Manchester City in a £200,000 deal.

21 March 1987 – Everton keep their title hopes alive with a 2–1 home win over Charlton Athletic. The latest relegation crunch thriller sees Southampton beat Aston Villa 5–0 at The Dell. In the Second Division, Plymouth Argyle boost their hopes of reaching the First Division for the first time by beating Grimsby Town 5–0 at Home Park.

22 March 1987 – A First Division clash at White Hart Lane adds heat to the title race as Tottenham Hotspur beat Liverpool 1–0. Liverpool are still six points ahead of their nearest rivals Everton, who have two games in hand and a superior goal difference, while Tottenham are 14 points off the top but have five games in hand.

24 March 1987 – Charlton Athletic and Oxford United share the points in a goalless draw at Selhurst Park and stay clear of the bottom four. Southampton move closer to safety with a 3–0 home win over Luton Town. West Ham United's downturn continues with a 2–0 home defeat to Sheffield Wednesday. Wimbledon move closer to securing a top-half finish to their first season in the First Division by beating Coventry City 2–1.

25 March 1987 – Aston Villa drop two more points in their survival battle as they draw 1–1 at home to Watford. Leicester City climb out of the bottom four with a 4–1 home win over Queens Park Rangers. Newcastle United remain bottom after drawing 1–1 at home to Tottenham Hotspur.

26 March 1987 – Arsenal pay Leicester City £850,000 for 24-year-old striker Alan Smith, and then loan him back to Leicester until the end of the season.

28 March 1987 – Liverpool's title bid is hit with a shock 2–1 home defeat against Wimbledon. Everton gain a crucial 1–0 victory over Arsenal at Highbury, boosting their title hopes and leaving the home side's title hopes looking slim. Manchester City crash to the bottom of the table with a 4–0 defeat against Leicester City at Filbert Street, which is a major boost for the home side's survival hopes. Aston Villa boost their own survival bid with a 1–0 home win over Coventry City. Luton Town go third with a 3–1 home win over Tottenham Hotspur. Newcastle United climb off the bottom of the table with a 2–0 home win over Southampton. Portsmouth go top of the Second Division with a 3–1 home win over Sunderland.

29 March 1987 – Second Division Blackburn Rovers lift the Full Members' Cup by beating First Division Charlton Athletic 1–0 at Wembley with a goal from Colin Hendry in their first Wembley final for 27 years.

31 March 1987 – Liverpool end March as First Division leaders, but only by a three-point margin over an Everton side who have two games in hand. Arsenal's challenge has faded after a run of six League matches without scoring, but Luton Town continue to defy the odds by occupying third place. Manchester City, Newcastle United and Charlton Athletic are tied on points at the bottom of the table. Portsmouth and Derby County remain at the top of the Second Division, while Oldham Athletic, Ipswich Town and Plymouth Argyle are still in the play-off zone.

1 April 1987 – England keep up their 100% record in the European Championship qualifiers with a 2–0 win over Northern Ireland at Windsor Park in their third qualifying game.

2 April 1987 – The former Aston Villa and Wales midfielder Trevor Hockey dies of a heart attack at the age of 43 after collapsing during a charity football match in West Yorkshire.

4 April 1987 – First Division strugglers Aston Villa and Manchester City draw 0–0 at Villa Park. Newcastl United beat Leicester City 2–0 at home. A seven-goal thriller at Selhurst Park sees Charlton Athletic beat Watford 4–3 to boost their survival bid. Tottenham Hotspur keep their title hopes alive with a 3–0 home win over Norwich City. Everton go top of the league with a 2–1 win at Chelsea. Peter Davenport scores twice in a 3–2 home win for Manchester United over Oxford United. Derby County return to the top of the Second Division with a 2–0 win over Ipswich Town at Portman Road, while Portsmouth drop down to second with a 1–0 defeat at Bradford City.

5 April 1987 – Arsenal win the League Cup, beating Liverpool 2–1 in the final at Wembley. Charlie Nicholas scores both of Arsenal's goals, which gives them their first League Cup triumph ever and their first major trophy for eight years. Ian Rush scores on the losing side for the first time in his Liverpool career.

6 April 1987 – In the only league action of the day, Queens Park Rangers beat Watford 3–0 at Vicarage Road.

7 April 1987 – A midweek London derby sees Charlton Athletic and Chelsea draw 0–0 at Selhurst Park. Tottenham Hotspur remain in the hunt for the title with a 1–0 away win over Sheffield Wednesday. Southampton and Wimbledon draw 2–2 at The Dell.

8 April 1987 – Newcastle United climb out of the bottom four with a 4–1 home win over Norwich City. Arsenal's title hopes are virtually ended when they are beaten 3–1 by West Ham United at Upton Park. Second Division leaders Derby County moved closer to ending their seven-year exile from the First Division by beating Huddersfield Town 2–0 at the Baseball Ground.

9 April 1987 – Fourth Division side Halifax Town become the first Football League members to be run by their local council as part of a rescue package to save the club from bankruptcy.

11 April 1987 – Tottenham Hotspur reach their eighth FA Cup final by beating Watford 4–1 in the Villa Park semi-final. Charlton Athletic's survival chances are hit by a 2–1 defeat to Arsenal at Highbury. Everton remain in pole position in the title race by beating West Ham United 4–0 at Goodison Park. Manchester City's survival hopes are hit hard when they lose 4–2 at home to Southampton. A similar blow befalls Liverpool's title hopes as they lose 2–1 to Norwich City at Carrow Road. Derby County remain top of the Second Division despite drawing 0–0 at home to local rivals Stoke City, although Portsmouth are a point behind with a game in hand.

12 April 1987 – Coventry City reach their first cup final by beating Leeds United 3–2 at Hillsborough in the semi-final of the FA Cup. In the Second Division, a Midlands derby at St Andrew's sees West Bromwich Albion beat Birmingham City 1–0.

14 April 1987 – Newcastle United take another step towards First Division survival with a 1–0 win over Arsenal at Highbury. Nottingham Forest go sixth with a 3–2 away win over Sheffield Wednesday. Watford climb into the top half of the table by beating Chelsea 3–1 at Vicarage Road. West Ham's clash with Manchester United at Upton Park ends in a goalless draw.

15 April 1987 – Tottenham Hotspur's title hopes are left hanging by a thread after they are held to a 1–1 draw by Manchester City at Maine Road, while the lost two points are a major blow to the hosts in their battle for survival.

16 April 1987 – Lawrie McMenemy resigns as manager of Second Division strugglers Sunderland, and is succeeded by Bob Stokoe, who was manager at Sunderland when they won the FA Cup in 1973.

18 April 1987 – Everton move closer to winning the First Division title with a 1–0 away win over Aston Villa, who are six points adrift of the relegation playoff place and seven points adrift of automatic survival with five games remaining. Liverpool keep up their title bid with a 3–0 home win over Nottingham Forest, as do Tottenham Hotspur with a 1–0 home win over Charlton Athletic. Luton Town's excellent season continues with a 2–0 home win over Coventry City keeping them in fourth place. Newcastle United move closer to survival with a 2–1 home win over Manchester United. Leicester City keep clear of the bottom four with a 1–0 home win over West Ham United. Portsmouth go top of the Second Division on goal difference ahead of Derby County, who have a game in hand, by drawing 2–2 with Reading at Elm Park.

20 April 1987 – Without kicking a ball, Everton took a huge step towards the league title as their last realistic title rivals Liverpool and Tottenham Hotspur were both beaten. Tottenham lost 2–1 to London rivals West Ham United at Upton Park, and Liverpool went down 1–0 to a Peter Davenport goal for Manchester United at Old Trafford. A relegation crunch game at Selhurst Park saw Charlton Athletic boost their survival hopes by winning 3–0 against Aston Villa, whose survival hopes were left hanging by a thread. Things were looking even more grim for Manchester City, who lost 3–2 at Sheffield Wednesday and needed at least eight points from their last four games to stand any chance of survival.

25 April 1987 – A major twist occurs at both ends of the First Division, with victories for Liverpool and Tottenham Hotspur keeping their title hopes alive, while comprehensive victories for the bottom two of Aston Villa and Manchester City keeps the survival hopes of both clubs alive. Derby County beat Sheffield United 1–0 at Bramall Lane and now need just one point to secure automatic promotion, as do Portsmouth after a 2–0 win over Grimsby Town at Blundell Park.

28 April 1987 – England under-21s suffer a major blow to their European Championship qualification hopes when they draw 0–0 with Turkey in İzmir.

29 April 1987 – England's 100% record in the European Championship qualifiers ends in the fourth game when they can only manage a goalless draw with Turkey in İzmir.

30 April 1987 – Scarborough seal the Conference title to become the first team to win automatic promotion to the Football League following last summer's abolition of the re-election system. In the First Division, Everton hold three-point lead over Liverpool with a game in hand, and are eight points clear of third-placed Tottenham Hotspur. Derby County have overhauled Portsmouth at the top of the Second Division, while Oldham Athletic are the only other team still able to achieve automatic promotion.

2 May 1987 – Aston Villa are left needing at least four points from their final two games after losing 2–1 to Arsenal at Highbury. Charlton Athletic's survival hopes take a hit when they lose 1–0 at home to Luton Town. Leicester City are still in danger of going down after losing 3–1 at Chelsea. Liverpool's title hopes are now fading fast after they are beaten 1–0 by the FA Cup finalists Coventry City at Highfield Road. Everton are forced to wait for the title after being held to a goalless draw at home by a Manchester City side whose survival challenge is still alive. A dead rubber match at Hillsborough sees Sheffield Wednesday beat Queens Park Rangers 7–1. Derby County seal promotion to the First Division by beating Leeds United 2–1 at the Baseball Ground. Portsmouth beat Millwall 2–0 at Fratton Park, leaving them needing just a point from their final two league games to secure automatic promotion.

4 May 1987 – Everton secure the First Division title with a 1–0 win over Norwich City at Carrow Road, despite Liverpool beating Watford 1–0 at Anfield and Tottenham Hotspur beating Manchester United 4–0 at White Hart Lane. Aston Villa's relegation is confirmed as they lose 2–1 at home to Sheffield Wednesday, but Manchester City keep their survival hopes alive with a 1–0 home win over Nottingham Forest. Charlton Athletic move into the relegation playoff place by beating Newcastle 3–0 on Tyneside, with Leicester City dropping into the bottom three after being held to a 1–1 draw at home by local rivals Coventry City. Portsmouth are forced to wait for promotion to the First Division after losing 1–0 away to a Crystal Palace side who keep their playoff hopes alive in the process. Brighton and Hove Albion's 2–0 defeat at Bradford City condemns them to relegation to the Third Division.

5 May 1987 – Oxford United secure First Division survival with a 3–2 away win over Luton Town. Wimbledon are guaranteed a top 10 finish after beating Chelsea 2–1 at Plough Lane. Oldham Athletic's 2–0 defeat to Shrewsbury Town at Gay Meadow sends Portsmouth back into the First Division after a 28-year exile.

8 May 1987 – Relegated Aston Villa sack Billy McNeill after eight months as manager.

9 May 1987 – Ian Rush completes his Liverpool career before signing for Juventus by scoring in a 3–3 draw at Chelsea. Norwich City achieve the highest final position in their history when a 2–1 away win over Arsenal sees them finish fifth. Luton Town also achieve their highest finish, securing seventh place in the final table despite a 3–1 defeat at Everton. Manchester City go down after a 2–0 defeat at West Ham United, as do a Leicester City side who could only manage a goalless draw at Oxford United. Charlton Athletic are thrown a First Division lifeline when a 2–1 home win over Queens Park Rangers ensures that they occupy the relegation play-off place in the final table. Derby County are crowned champions of the Second Division, while Grimsby Town are relegated and Sunderland finish in the relegation playoff place.

11 May 1987 – Champions Everton finish their League campaign by beating third-placed Tottenham Hotspur 1–0.

16 May 1987 – Coventry City win the first major trophy of their history with a 3–2 victory after extra time over Tottenham Hotspur in the FA Cup final. A thrilling game had seen Clive Allen put Tottenham Hotspur ahead in the second minute with his 49th goal of the season, only for Dave Bennett to equalise in the ninth minute. Gary Mabbutt restored Tottenham's lead after 40 minutes, but Keith Houchen's 64th-minute equaliser for Coventry City forced extra time. The winning goal came in the 96th minute, when Gary Mabbutt scored an own goal.

17 May 1987 – Sunderland are relegated to the Third Division for the first time in their history after being defeated on away goals in the Second Division relegation/Third Division promotion play-off semi-final by Gillingham, who will take on Swindon Town later this month to battle for a Second Division place. Bolton Wanderers go into the Fourth Division for the first time after suffering a similar humiliation at the hands of Aldershot. More than 16,300 fans watch Wolverhampton Wanderers go through to the final, where they will face Aldershot in a two-legged challenge for promotion to the Third Division.

18 May 1987 – Graham Taylor resigns after 11 years as Watford manager to succeed Billy McNeill at relegated Aston Villa. During his time at Watford, Taylor took the club from the Fourth Division to the First, finishing league runners-up in their first top flight season and reaching the FA Cup final in their second. Southampton give a free transfer to their longest serving player Nick Holmes, the last remaining player from their 1976 FA Cup winning side.

19 May 1987 – Mel Machin is named as the new manager of relegated Manchester City, with his predecessor Jimmy Frizzell remaining at the club as his assistant. Aston Villa begin rebuilding following relegation with the sale of defender Tony Dorigo to Chelsea for £450,000.

22 May 1987 – Gillingham take a further step towards reaching the Second Division for the first time in their history by beating Swindon Town 1–0 at Priestfield in the first leg of the Third Division play-off final. Aldershot gain a 2–0 advantage over Wolves at home in the Fourth Division contest.

23 May 1987 – Charlton Athletic beat Leeds United 1–0 in the first leg of the play-off final for a place in the First Division next season.

24 May 1987 – Mansfield Town lift the Freight Rover Trophy by beating Bristol City on penalties after a 1–1 draw at Wembley.

25 May 1987 – More than 31,000 fans watch Leeds United beat Charlton Athletic 1–0 in the second leg of the contest for a place in next season's First Division, forcing a replay at a neutral venue. The same outcome materialises in the contest for a place in the Second Division, as Swindon Town are now level with Gillingham after winning the second leg of their contest 2–1 at the County Ground. Almost 20,000 fans pack the Molineux to watch Aldershot beat Wolverhampton Wanderers to win promotion to the Third Division.

26 May 1987 – Arsenal sign Wimbledon defender Nigel Winterburn for £405,000.

29 May 1987 – Charlton Athletic stay in the First Division after Peter Shirtliff scores twice in extra time to beat Leeds United 2–1 in the play-off final replay at St Andrew's. Swindon Town secure a second successive promotion by winning a replay of the Third Division final 2–0 against Gillingham at the neutral venue of Selhurst Park.

3 June 1987 – Sheffield Wednesday sign midfielder Steve McCall from Ipswich Town for £300,000.

7 June 1987 – England's under-21s commence the Toulon Tournament with a first round 2–0 win over Morocco, with goals from Newcastle United's Paul Gascoigne and Manchester City's Paul Simpson.

9 June 1987 – Orient revert to their original name of Leyton Orient. England under-21s draw 0–0 with the USSR in their second Toulon Tournament group game.

10 June 1987 – Liverpool sign John Barnes from Watford for £800,000.

11 June 1987 – England under-21s reach the next stage of the Toulon Tournament despite losing 2–0 to France.

13 June 1987 – England under-21s progress from the second stage of the Toulon Tournament by being Turkey on penalties after a goalless draw.

15 June 1987 – Despite guiding Luton Town to their best ever finish of seventh in the First Division in his only season as manager, John Moore resigns to be succeeded by his assistant, the former Fulham manager Ray Harford.

18 June 1987 – Queens Park Rangers sign defender Paul Parker from Fulham for £300,000.

19 June 1987 – Tottenham tie up two deals in one day: England U21 Chris Fairclough signs from Nottingham Forest while Gary Mabbutt – a Manchester United transfer target – signs a "new long-term contract".

21 June 1987 – Glenn Hoddle leaves Tottenham Hotspur in a £750,000 move to AS Monaco.

24 June 1987 – England goalkeeper Peter Shilton leaves Southampton for newly promoted Derby County in a deal reported to be worth up to £1million – the highest fee for a goalkeeper in British football.

25 June 1987 – Chelsea boost their attack with a £335,000 move for Ipswich Town and Northern Ireland striker Kevin Wilson.

30 June 1987 – Liverpool break the British transfer fee record by paying £1.9 million for Newcastle United and England forward Peter Beardsley.

== FA Cup ==
Coventry City and Tottenham Hotspur contested the final. Coventry were in the final for the first time, whereas Tottenham had won all seven of their previous appearances and were looking to set a new record of eight FA Cup victories, having equalled Aston Villa's record of seven FA Cup victories in 1982. But a 3–2 win after extra time gave Coventry the first major trophy in their history. Spurs had opened the scoring through Gary Mabbutt, who later scored an own goal, and their other goal came from top scorer Clive Allen, who found the net 49 times all competitions during a season where Spurs challenged to win all three domestic trophies but in the end failed to win any of them.

The ban on English clubs in Europe prevented them from qualifying for the European Cup Winners' Cup of 1987–88.

== League Cup ==
George Graham's return to Arsenal as manager was a success as he guided the North Londoners to glory in the League Cup after an eight-year trophy drought. Arsenal's run included a semi-final tussle with their arch-rivals Tottenham Hotspur which they eventually won with a 2–1 replay victory at White Hart Lane. The final against Liverpool was the first time the Merseysiders had lost a game in which Ian Rush had scored. The Welshman gave the Merseysiders a first half lead only for Charlie Nicholas to bag two goals, the first a scrambled effort from a free-kick, and in the second half a low deflected shot past Bruce Grobbelaar after a cross by Perry Groves.

== Football League ==
=== First Division ===
Despite the pre-season departure of Gary Lineker and the loss of several players for significant periods through injury (including Paul Bracewell for the entire season), Everton won their second league title in three seasons with a nine-point lead over Merseyside rivals Liverpool, who were also on the losing side in the League Cup to Arsenal.

Tottenham Hotspur challenged for all three domestic honours, but ended the season with nothing: they finished third in the league, lost to Arsenal in the semi-finals of the League Cup, and suffered a shock defeat to Coventry City in the FA Cup final. Fourth placed Arsenal led the league for much of the winter but compensated for a subsequent collapse in league form by lifting the League Cup for the first time, ending their eight-year trophy drought. Fifth place went to newly promoted Norwich City, who performed well and along with Everton were the hardest team in the division to beat all season. Wimbledon's first season in the First Division and their tenth in the Football League was a great success, as they briefly topped the table early in the season and finished sixth. Luton Town achieved the best season of their history by finishing seventh.

The pressure was on Ron Atkinson after Manchester United's failed title challenge the previous season, and after a heavy defeat at Southampton in a League Cup replay early in November, Atkinson was gone and his job was given to Alex Ferguson, who had achieved great success north of the border at Aberdeen. Despite not buying any new players during the season, Ferguson was able to steer United to a secure 11th-place finish in the final table, six months after they had been in the relegation places.

A mere five years after lifting the European Cup, Aston Villa finished bottom of the First Division and were relegated. They went down along with Manchester City and Leicester City, but Charlton Athletic kept their First Division status after triumphing over Second Division opposition in the new playoffs.

Chelsea and West Ham United struggled at the wrong end of the First Division a season after being title contenders, but managed to avoid relegation.

The end of the 1986–87 season saw extensive activity by First Division clubs in the transfer market. Liverpool were faced with a future without Ian Rush following his move to Juventus, but used the windfall to sign Peter Beardsley from Newcastle United for a national record fee of £1.9million, and pay nearly £1million for Watford and England winger John Barnes. The Reds had also prepared for life without Rush with a mid-season move for Oxford United striker John Aldridge. Midfielder Glenn Hoddle, 29, who had spent all of his career at Tottenham, became the latest player to leave the English First Division for another nation when he signed for AS Monaco. Arsenal strengthened their ranks by paying £850,000 for Leicester City striker Alan Smith. Alex Ferguson paid Celtic £850,000 for prolific striker Brian McClair, who was originally valued at £2million, and bolstered his defence with a £250,000 move for Arsenal and England defender Viv Anderson.

Pos	Team	Pld	W	D	L	GF	GA	GD	Pts	Qualification or relegation
1	Everton (C)	42	26	8	8	76	31	+45	86	Disqualified from the European Cup
2	Liverpool	42	23	8	11	72	42	+30	77	Disqualified from the UEFA Cup
3	Tottenham Hotspur	42	21	8	13	68	43	+25	71	Disqualified from the UEFA Cup
4	Arsenal (Note: Arsenal would have qualified as League Cup winners.)	42	20	10	12	58	35	+23	70	Disqualified from the UEFA Cup
5	Norwich City	42	17	17	8	53	51	+2	68	
6	Wimbledon	42	19	9	14	57	50	+7	66	
7	Luton Town	42	18	12	12	47	45	+2	66	
8	Nottingham Forest	42	18	11	13	64	51	+13	65	
9	Watford	42	18	9	15	67	54	+13	63	
10	Coventry City (Note: Coventry City would have qualified as FA Cup winners.)	42	17	12	13	50	45	+5	63	Disqualified from the European Cup Winners' Cup
11	Manchester United	42	14	14	14	52	45	+7	56	
12	Southampton	42	14	10	18	69	68	+1	52	
13	Sheffield Wednesday	42	13	13	16	58	59	−1	52	
14	Chelsea	42	13	13	16	53	64	−11	52	
15	West Ham United	42	14	10	18	52	67	−15	52	
16	Queens Park Rangers	42	13	11	18	48	64	−16	50	
17	Newcastle United	42	12	11	19	47	65	−18	47	
18	Oxford United	42	11	13	18	44	69	−25	46	
19	Charlton Athletic (O)	42	11	11	20	45	55	−10	44	Qualification for the Second Division play-offs
20	Leicester City (R)	42	11	9	22	54	76	−22	42	Relegation to the Second Division
21	Manchester City (R)	42	8	15	19	36	57	−21	39	Relegation to the Second Division
22	Aston Villa (R)	42	8	12	22	45	79	−34	36	Relegation to the Second Division

Source: World Football
Rules for classification: 1) Points; 2) Goal difference; 3) Goals scored
(C) Champions; (O) Play-off winners; (R) Relegated

==== Second Division play-offs ====
Semi-finals; 1st leg – 14 May; 2nd leg – 17 May 1987
19th	Charlton Athletic	0	2	2
5th	Ipswich Town	0	1	1
3rd	Oldham Athletic	0	2	2
4th	Leeds United	1	1	2

Finals; 1st leg – 23 May; 2nd leg – 25 May 1987; replay – 29 May 1987
19th	Charlton Athletic	1	0	2
4th	Leeds United	0	1	1

=== Second Division ===
Derby County's revival continued with a second successive promotion and the Second Division title. They were joined by a Portsmouth side whose last taste of First Division action was in the late 1950s.

The first team to miss out on automatic promotion from 3rd place under the new play-off system was Oldham Athletic, seeking top-flight football for the first time since 1923, who then lost to 4th-place Leeds United on a last-minute aggregate-equalizer and deciding away goal. Billy Bremner enjoyed a good first full season as manager of the Leeds United side he had once captained as a player, taking them to the FA Cup semi-finals as well as the playoffs, where only a defeat to Charlton Athletic in the final prevented them from reclaiming the First Division place they had last held in 1982. Charlton, 20th-place finishers in Division 1, had ended 5th-place Ipswich Town's hopes of an immediate return to the First Division in the semi-finals.

Financially troubled Grimsby Town were unsurprisingly relegated to the Third Division, but it was perhaps more surprising to see Brighton lose their Second Division status after the three secure finishes that had followed the loss of their First Division status in 1983 – the year where they had almost won the FA Cup. The final relegation place went to Sunderland, who fell into the Third Division for the first time in their history after failing in the playoffs.

Pos	Team	Pld	W	D	L	GF	GA	GD	Pts	Qualification or relegation
1	Derby County (C, P)	42	25	9	8	64	38	+26	84	Promotion to the First Division
2	Portsmouth (P)	42	23	9	10	53	28	+25	78	Promotion to the First Division
3	Oldham Athletic	42	22	9	11	65	44	+21	75	Qualification for the Second Division play-offs
4	Leeds United	42	19	11	12	58	44	+14	68	Qualification for the Second Division play-offs
5	Ipswich Town	42	17	13	12	59	43	+16	64	Qualification for the Second Division play-offs
6	Crystal Palace	42	19	5	18	51	53	−2	62	
7	Plymouth Argyle	42	16	13	13	62	57	+5	61	
8	Stoke City	42	16	10	16	63	53	+10	58	
9	Sheffield United	42	15	13	14	50	49	+1	58	
10	Bradford City	42	15	10	17	62	62	0	55	
11	Barnsley	42	14	13	15	49	52	−3	55	
12	Blackburn Rovers	42	15	10	17	45	55	−10	55	
13	Reading	42	14	11	17	52	59	−7	53	
14	Hull City	42	13	14	15	41	55	−14	53	
15	West Bromwich Albion	42	13	12	17	51	49	+2	51	
16	Millwall	42	14	9	19	39	45	−6	51	
17	Huddersfield Town	42	13	12	17	54	61	−7	51	
18	Shrewsbury Town	42	15	6	21	41	53	−12	51	
19	Birmingham City	42	11	17	14	47	59	−12	50	
20	Sunderland (R)	42	12	12	18	49	59	−10	48	Qualification for the Third Division play-offs
21	Grimsby Town (R)	42	10	14	18	39	59	−20	44	Relegation to the Third Division
22	Brighton & Hove Albion (R)	42	9	12	21	37	54	−17	39	Relegation to the Third Division

Rules for classification: 1) Points; 2) Goal difference; 3) Goals scored
(C) Champions; (P) Promoted; (R) Relegated

==== Third Division play-offs ====
Semi-finals; 1st leg – 14 May; 2nd leg – 17 May 1987
20th	Sunderland	2	4	6
5th	Gillingham	3	3	6
3rd	Swindon Town	3	0	3
4th	Wigan Athletic	2	0	2

Finals; 1st leg – 22 May; 2nd leg – 25 May 1987; replay – 29 May 1987
3rd	Swindon Town	0	2	2
5th	Gillingham	1	1	0

=== Third Division ===
Former West Ham United player Harry Redknapp managed AFC Bournemouth to the Third Division title and secured them a place in the Second Division for the very first time, while Middlesbrough thrived under new ownership after almost going out of business and their impressive young team were promoted straight back to the Second Division as runners-up in the Third. The final promotion place went to Swindon Town, whose success in the playoffs gave them a second consecutive promotion.

Newport County's mounting debts and the gradual breakup of the team that had almost reached the Second Division in 1983 culminated in inevitable relegation to the Fourth Division, with Darlington and Carlisle United following them down. The fourth and final relegation place went to Bolton Wanderers, the second illustrious Football League side this season to reach its lowest ebb as victims of the new playoffs.

Pos	Team	Pld	W	D	L	GF	GA	GD	Pts	Promotion or relegation
1	Bournemouth (C, P)	46	29	10	7	76	40	+36	97	Promotion to the Second Division
2	Middlesbrough (P)	46	28	10	8	67	30	+37	94	Promotion to the Second Division
3	Swindon Town (O, P)	46	25	12	9	77	47	+30	87	Qualification for the Third Division play-offs
4	Wigan Athletic	46	25	10	11	83	60	+23	85	Qualification for the Third Division play-offs
5	Gillingham	46	23	9	14	65	48	+17	78	Qualification for the Third Division play-offs
6	Bristol City	46	21	14	11	63	36	+27	77	
7	Notts County	46	21	13	12	77	56	+21	76	
8	Walsall	46	22	9	15	80	67	+13	75	
9	Blackpool	46	16	16	14	74	59	+15	64	
10	Mansfield Town	46	15	16	15	52	55	−3	61	
11	Brentford	46	15	15	16	64	66	−2	60	
12	Port Vale	46	15	12	19	76	70	+6	57	
13	Doncaster Rovers	46	14	15	17	56	62	−6	57	
14	Rotherham United	46	15	12	19	48	57	−9	57	
15	Chester City	46	13	17	16	61	59	+2	56	
16	Bury	46	14	13	19	54	60	−6	55	
17	Chesterfield	46	13	15	18	56	69	−13	54	
18	Fulham	46	12	17	17	59	77	−18	53	
19	Bristol Rovers	46	13	12	21	49	75	−26	51	
20	York City	46	12	13	21	55	79	−24	49	
21	Bolton Wanderers (R)	46	10	15	21	46	58	−12	45	Qualification for the Fourth Division play-offs
22	Carlisle United (R)	46	10	8	28	39	78	−39	38	Relegation to the Fourth Division
23	Darlington (R)	46	7	16	23	45	77	−32	37	Relegation to the Fourth Division
24	Newport County (R)	46	8	13	25	49	86	−37	37	Relegation to the Fourth Division

(C) Champions; (O) Play-off winners; (P) Promoted; (R) Relegated

==== Fourth Division play-offs ====
Semi-finals; 1st leg – 14 May; 2nd leg – 17 May 1987
21st	Bolton Wanderers	0	2	2
6th	Aldershot	1	2	3
4th	Wolverhampton Wanderers	2	0	2
5th	Colchester United	0	0	0

Finals; 1st leg – 23 May; 2nd leg – 25 May 1987
6th	Aldershot	2	1	3
4th	Wolverhampton Wanderers	0	0	0

=== Fourth Division ===
Northampton Town's season brought them 103 goals, 99 points, the Fourth Division title and a place in the Third Division. A season after having to apply to stay in the Football League, Preston North End had a turnaround in fortunes and won promotion from the Fourth Division as runners-up under new manager John McGrath. The last automatic promotion place went to Southend United, while Aldershot triumphed in the playoffs at the expense of their illustrious rivals Wolverhampton Wanderers.

Lincoln City became the first team to suffer automatic relegation from the Football League, as a result of failing to win their final game of the season while Burnley (league champions as recently as 1960) won their last game and Torquay United drew their last game with an injury-time goal after an injured player was bitten by a police dog.

Pos	Team	Pld	W	D	L	GF	GA	GD	Pts	Promotion or relegation
1	Northampton Town (C, P)	46	30	9	7	103	53	+50	99	Promotion to the Third Division
2	Preston North End (P)	46	26	12	8	72	47	+25	90	Promotion to the Third Division
3	Southend United (P)	46	25	5	16	68	55	+13	80	Promotion to the Third Division
4	Wolverhampton Wanderers	46	24	7	15	69	50	+19	79	Qualification for the Fourth Division play-offs
5	Colchester United	46	21	7	18	64	56	+8	70	Qualification for the Fourth Division play-offs
6	Aldershot (O, P)	46	20	10	16	64	57	+7	70	Qualification for the Fourth Division play-offs
7	Orient	46	20	9	17	64	61	+3	69	
8	Scunthorpe United	46	18	12	16	73	57	+16	66	
9	Wrexham	46	15	20	11	70	51	+19	65	
10	Peterborough United	46	17	14	15	57	50	+7	65	
11	Cambridge United	46	17	11	18	60	62	−2	62	
12	Swansea City	46	17	11	18	56	61	−5	62	
13	Cardiff City	46	15	16	15	48	50	−2	61	
14	Exeter City	46	11	23	12	53	49	+4	56	
15	Halifax Town	46	15	10	21	59	74	−15	55	
16	Hereford United	46	14	11	21	60	61	−1	53	
17	Crewe Alexandra	46	13	14	19	70	72	−2	53	
18	Hartlepool United	46	11	18	17	44	65	−21	51	
19	Stockport County	46	13	12	21	40	69	−29	51	
20	Tranmere Rovers	46	11	17	18	54	72	−18	50	
21	Rochdale	46	11	17	18	54	73	−19	50	
22	Burnley	46	12	13	21	53	74	−21	49	
23	Torquay United	46	10	18	18	56	72	−16	48	
24	Lincoln City (R)	46	12	12	22	45	65	−20	48	Relegation to the Football Conference

(C) Champions; (O) Play-off winners; (P) Promoted; (R) Relegated

=== Top goalscorers ===
First Division

- Clive Allen (Tottenham Hotspur) – 33 goals

Second Division

- Micky Quinn (Portsmouth) – 22 goals

Third Division

- Andy Jones (Port Vale) – 27 goals

Fourth Division

- Richard Hill (Northampton Town) – 28 goals

== Non-league football ==
The divisional champions of the major non-League competitions were:

Competition	Winners
Football Conference	Scarborough
Isthmian League	Wycombe Wanderers
Northern Premier League	Macclesfield Town
Southern League	Fisher Athletic
FA Trophy	Kidderminster Harriers
FA Vase	St Helens Town

== Awards and achievements ==
=== Players ===
- Tottenham Hotspur striker Clive Allen, who scored 49 goals in all competitions, was voted both PFA Players' Player of the Year and FWA Footballer of the Year – although his prolific goalscoring was not enough to win any trophies for Spurs who had been in the hunt for all three domestic prizes throughout the season.
- 20-year-old Arsenal defender Tony Adams was voted PFA Young Player of the Year for contributing to his side's good progress in the league as well as their League Cup triumph.
- Winger Martin Hayes, 22, was Arsenal's top scorer with 26 goals in all competitions.
- 21-year-old Nigel Clough was Nottingham Forest's joint top league goalscorer with 14 First Division goals.
- Micky Quinn scored 24 league goals to help Portsmouth win promotion to the First Division, despite missing three games in February while he served a prison sentence for disqualified driving.

=== Managers ===
- Howard Kendall was voted Manager of the Year for guiding Everton to their second league title in three seasons.
- In the First Division, Ken Brown guided Norwich City to a top-five finish just one year after winning promotion back to the top flight.
- Dave Bassett helped Wimbledon achieve a strong sixth-place finish in their first season as a top division club, and only their tenth in the Football League.
- George Graham ended Arsenal's eight-year trophy drought by bringing them silverware in the shape of the League Cup.
- Coventry City's John Sillett brought his club their first-ever major trophy by guiding them to victory over favourites Tottenham Hotspur in the FA Cup final.
- In the Second Division, Arthur Cox helped Derby County win the Second Division championship one year after they had won promotion from the Third Division.
- Portsmouth's Alan Ball guided his side to the Second Division runners-up spot and helped them win promotion after a long absence from the top flight.
- Joe Royle continued to take Oldham Athletic from strength to strength in the Second Division and they only just missed out on promotion.
- In the Third Division, Harry Redknapp guided AFC Bournemouth to championship glory and brought them Second Division football for the first time.
- Bruce Rioch rescued Middlesbrough from financial oblivion to secure the second promotion place to the Second Division.
- Lou Macari secured Swindon Town's second successive promotion, this time as playoff winners in the Third Division.
- In the Fourth Division, Graham Carr built a strong Northampton Town side which ran away with the championship.
- Neil Warnock led Scarborough to the Conference title. They came the first club to gain automatic promotion to the league.

== Famous debutants ==
26 August 1986 – Steve Sedgley, 18-year-old midfielder, makes his debut for Coventry City in their 2-1 win over Arsenal at Highfield Road in the First Division.

30 August 1986 – Matthew Le Tissier, 17-year-old attacking midfielder, makes his debut for Southampton in their 4–3 defeat by Norwich City at Carrow Road in the First Division.

27 September 1986 – David White, 18-year-old forward, makes his debut for Manchester City in their 1-0 defeat at Luton Town at Kenilworth Road in the First Division.

22 November 1986 – Paul Merson, 18-year-old forward, makes his debut for Arsenal in their 3–0 win over Manchester City at Highbury in the First Division.

29 November 1986 – Gavin Peacock, 19-year-old attacking midfielder, makes his debut for Q.P.R. in their 2-2 draw with Sheffield Wednesday at Loftus Road in the First Division.

30 November 1986 – Paul Ince, 19-year-old midfielder, makes his debut for West Ham United in their 4–0 defeat by Newcastle United at St James' Park in the First Division.

20 December 1986 – Gary Ablett, 21-year-old defender, makes his debut for Liverpool in a goalless away draw with Charlton Athletic in the First Division.

14 February 1987 – Michael Thomas, 19-year-old midfielder, makes his debut for Arsenal in their 1–1 draw with Sheffield Wednesday at Hillsborough in the First Division.

2 May 1987 – Vinny Samways, 18-year-old midfielder, makes his debut for Tottenham Hotspur in their 2-0 defeat at Nottingham Forest at the City Ground in the First Division.

== Deaths ==
- 9 July 1986 – Tommy Barnett, 77, played as an inside forward for Watford from 1928 to 1939, scoring 144 goals in 395 league appearances.
- 18 July 1986 – Sir Stanley Rous, 91, was Football Association Secretary from 1934 to 1962 and president of FIFA from 1961 to 1974.
- 28 August 1986 – Cyril Trailor, 67, Welsh born former Tottenham Hotspur and Orient wing-half, played 50 Football League games between 1938 and 1950.
- 1 September 1986 – Ivor Guy, 60, played more than 400 games for Bristol City as a full-back between 1945 and 1957.
- 17 September 1986 – Albert Titley, 74, played four league games for Port Vale in the 1930s, having failed to break into the first team at West Bromwich Albion.
- 21 September 1986 – Jamie Baker, 9, was mascot for Everton in their fixture against Manchester United, and died hours later from leukaemia.
- 29 September 1986 – Billy Bottrill, 83, played 326 league games and scored 112 goals between 1922 and 1934 as a forward for a host of clubs, peaking in the early 1930s when his goals helped Wolverhampton Wanderers win promotion to the First Division.
- 1 October 1986 – John Potts, 82, kept goal in a total of 329 league appearances during the interwar years for Leeds United and Port Vale.
- 2 October 1986 – Bernard Radford, 78, was a prolific goalscorer for Nelson near the end of their Football League membership in the late 1920s, and also turned out for Sheffield United and Northampton Town before dropping into amateur football in his mid twenties.
- 14 October 1986 – Barry Salvage, 38, a former QPR and Fulham midfielder, died of a heart attack after collapsing at Eastbourne during a charity run.
- 16 October 1986 – Ted Sagar, 76, was a goalkeeper for Everton from 1929 until 1954. His teammates included Dixie Dean and Tommy Lawton.
- 31 October 1986 – Bob Hardisty, 64, played six league games for Darlington in the early postwar years, and later played for non-league Bishop Auckland. He appeared six times for the Great Britain national football team in 1948, 1952 and 1956, having spent most of his playing career as an amateur. He was signed by Manchester United as an emergency squad member in the aftermath of the Munich air disaster, but never played a first team game, although he was retained by Matt Busby as a member of the coaching staff.
- November (undated) – Jimmy Cunliffe, 74, scored 73 goals in 174 league games for Everton in the six seasons preceding the outbreak of World War II, and was capped once for England.
- 7 November 1986 – Charlie McGillivray, 74, played eight league games for Manchester United when they were a Second Division side in the first half of the 1930s. He spent most of his playing career in his native Scotland.
- 19 November 1986 – Jackie Arthur, 68, played more than 200 games for Stockport County, Chester and Rochdale between 1938 and 1953 in a career which was disrupted by the war. He also had two spells with Everton but did not play a first team game for them.
- 26 November 1986 – Fred Obrey, 74, played at centre-half for Port Vale Tranmere Rovers in the 1930s before the war halted his professional career.
- 1 December 1986 – Reg Attwell, 66, began his career as a wing-half with West Ham United before joining Burnley in 1946 and making more than 250 appearances for the club in the next eight years before completing his career at Bradford City.
- 3 December 1986 – Austin Hayes, 28, died of lung cancer just three weeks after the illness was diagnosed. He had been on the losing side for Southampton against Nottingham Forest in the 1979 League Cup final and was capped by the Republic of Ireland in the same year. He later turned out for Millwall and Northampton Town, and just before his death had a brief spell playing in Sweden.
- 31 December 1986 – Jack Bailey, 65, served Bristol City as a full-back between 1944 and 1958, making more than 350 appearances.
- 16 January 1987 – Jimmy Wilson, 62, scored 12 goals in 49 league games as an inside-forward and wing-half for Watford in the 1950s.
- 27 January 1987 – Roy Brien, 56, made his only Football League appearance in April 1954 as a half-back for Port Vale in the Third Division South.
- 8 March 1987 – Eddie O'Hara, 60, spent most of his career in his native Ireland but played six First Division games for Birmingham City in the early postwar years and had two spells with Hereford United when they were still a non-league club.
- 12 March 1987 – Arthur Briggs, 86, played for Hull City, Swindon Town and Tranmere Rovers as a centre-half during the interwar years.
- 13 March 1987 – Jack Haines, 66, scored twice for England in a 6–0 win over Switzerland in his only senior game for the country in 1948. His Football League career spanned from 1946 to 1956 and took in 91 goals for Swansea Town, Leicester City, West Bromwich Albion, Bradford Park Avenue, Rochdale and Chester. He also played for several non-league clubs.
- 13 March 1987 – Jim Kelso, 76, played in England and his native Scotland for clubs including Dumbarton, Port Vale and Cardiff City before his career was cut short by the Second World War.
- 2 April 1987 – Trevor Hockey, 43, died of a heart attack while participating in a five-a-side football tournament for charity. He was a former Welsh international footballer who also played for clubs including Bradford City and Aston Villa.
- 5 April 1987 – Jack Howe, 71, was capped three times for England in the late 1940s and played 276 league games between 1934 and 1951 in a career which began at Hartlepool United, took him to Derby County (where he collected an FA Cup winner's medal) and finished at Huddersfield Town before continuing playing at non-league level until the late 1950s.
- 6 April 1987 – George Payne, 65, kept goal 467 times for Tranmere Rovers between 1946 and 1961 and also played non-league football for Northwich Victoria in the 1960s.
- 9 April 1987 – Bert Flatley, 67, was an inside-forward who make his league debut in 1938 for York City before transferring to Port Vale a year later, only for his career to be disrupted by the outbreak of war after just two games. His only further taste of league action came in the early 1950s, when he made eight appearances for Workington in their first two seasons as a Football League club.
- 19 April 1987 – Stan Richards, 70, was capped once at senior level for Wales and scored well over 200 goals for Cardiff City, Swansea Town and Barry Town between 1946 and 1955.
- 22 April 1987 – Bill Hayes, 71, Irish born defender, played 184 league games for Huddersfield Town during two spells between 1934 and 1950 before completing his career at Burnley.
- 22 June 1987 – William Price, 83, was a winger for Port Vale in the late 1930s.
