= Gregor (musician) =

Krikor Kélékian (February 28, 1898 – 1971), better known as Gregor, was an Ottoman-French jazz bandleader of Armenian origin.

Gregor founded a group called the Gregorians in France in 1928, whose sidemen included Philippe Brun, Edmond Cohanier, and Lucien Moraweck, and which made some early recordings. In 1929-1930 he founded the Revue du jazz, the first publication to cover jazz music in France. In 1930 he led a large ensemble on a tour of South America, including six weeks in Rio de Janeiro, and recorded in Buenos Aires; his bands in the early 1930s included sideman such as Alix Combelle, Stéphane Grappelli, André Ekyan, and Michel Warlop. He died in Malente, Germany, in 1971.
