= André Ekyan =

French jazz musician

André Ekyan (born André Echkyan; October 24, 1907, Meudon - August 1972, Alicante, Spain) was a French jazz reedist.

Ekyan was the leader of a jazz ensemble at the club Le Perroquet in Paris late in the 1920s. in the 1930s, he played with Jack Hylton, Gregor, and Tommy Dorsey, and recorded with Django Reinhardt for several years. Other associations include work with Tommy Benford, Jacques Butler, Benny Carter, Frank Goudie, Coleman Hawkins, Mezz Mezzrow, Bobby Nichols, Joe Turner, and Ray Ventura.

== Filmography ==
Year	Title	Role	Notes
1970	Le Cercle Rouge	Rico	

== Sources ==
- Michel Laplace, "André Ekyan". The New Grove Dictionary of Jazz, 2nd edition, ed. Barry Kernfeld.
