= Goldene Sieben =

The Goldene Sieben ("Golden Seven") was a German jazz ensemble.

The Goldene Sieben was created in 1934 as the house band for the Berlin-based label Electrola. Henri René picked its initial members from noted local ensembles, but by 1935 the group was led by Georg Haentzschel. The group was broadcast on radio, though its contract forbade them from performing live. They appeared in the 1937 film Heimweh and recorded extensively.

== Members ==
Trumpet

- Kurt Hohenberger

Trombone

- Willy Berking
- Erhard Krause

Guitar/Banjo

- Henri René

Clarinet

- Ernst Höllerhagen
- Franz Thon

Saxophone

- Eddie Brunner
- Kurt Wege

Piano

- Willy Stech
- Peter Igelhoff
- Georg Haentzschel

Drums

- Freddie Brocksieper
