= Big Boy Goudie =

American jazz musician

Frank "Big Boy" Goudie (September 13, 1899 – January 9, 1964) was an American jazz trumpeter, alto and tenor saxophonist and clarinetist.

Goudie was born in Youngsville, Louisiana, United States, 150 miles west of New Orleans in the area of the state known as Cajun country, where he lived until age of eight. (It is likely he learned to speak French while growing up there, which would be useful later in his life.) His family then moved to New Orleans, where he began playing cornet, possibly studying with Bunk Johnson. He became proficient enough to find work with local bands such as Papa Celestin's Original Tuxedo Band and the Magnolia Band - two top bands in New Orleans at that time. He began studying clarinet and tenor saxophone, which would eventually become his primary instruments.

Goudie's arrival in New Orleans circa 1907 meant he had a tantalizing front-row seat to the blossoming of early jazz. Musicians such as King Oliver, Kid Ory, Johnny Dodds, Freddie Keppard, Jimmie Noone and a host of others, were in their prime and working at many venues throughout the city, in everything from duos, to six-piece jazz bands, to brass bands. Goudie may even have worked with, or crossed paths with, a young man close to his age, Louis Armstrong.

Between the years following the 1918 closure of "The District" (aka Storyville) and the early 1920s, New Orleans experienced a diaspora of musicians, one of whom was Goudie. In 1921 he joined a band accompanying a traveling minstrel show, and for the next four years he performed in Louisiana, Texas, New Mexico and California. He joined another traveling group, Frank Matthews and the Louisiana High Browns, ending up in Tampico, Mexico in 1925.

That same year he sailed to France, making Paris his home base for the next 14 years. Work was plentiful for expat African-American musicians in Paris prior to World War II, and he worked with bands led by Benny Peyton, Louis Mitchell, Sam Wooding, Noble Sissle, Freddy Johnson, Bill Coleman (1937), and Willie Lewis (1935-38). While in Paris he worked at "Bricktop's," owned and operated by Ada "Bricktop" Smith, who was a supporter of American jazz musicians. Goudie played often and recorded with Django Reinhardt. It is said while in Europe, Goudie carried a wicker suitcase full of upholstery tools with which to augment his income - a trade he likely learned as a young man in New Orleans. He left Paris in late 1939, moving to South America, where he worked in Brazil and Argentina with guitarist Oscar Aleman, and fronted his own groups.

In 1946, Goudie moved back to Paris, playing there with Arthur Briggs, Harry Cooper, and Bill Coleman (1949–51). In 1951, he moved to Berlin, again leading his own band. He recorded there in 1952 and 1953 and in Yugoslavia in 1955.

In mid-1957 he returned to the U.S. to run his uncle's business in San Francisco. His presence became known to the close-knit Bay Area jazz community and it was not long before he again was playing music and in demand, working with bands led by trumpeter Marty Marsala, pianists Earl Hines, Bill Erickson and Burt Bales, trombonist Bob Mielke and other local groups.

Goudie died of cancer at age 64, in San Francisco.

As a young man, his great height earned him the nickname "Tree," and he became known as "Big Boy" during his years in Paris.

Goudie's recording career began in December 1930 with the band of Noble Sissle, with whom he made his only known film appearance, a British Pathétone short filmed at Ciro's nightclub in London.

== Bibliography ==
- "Frank 'Big Boy' Goudie". The New Grove Dictionary of Jazz.
- "Frank 'Big Boy' Goudie". Who's Who in Jazz: Storyville to Swing Street by John Chilton. Bloomsbury Bookshop, London, 1970.
