= Danny Polo =

American jazz clarinetist (1901–1949)

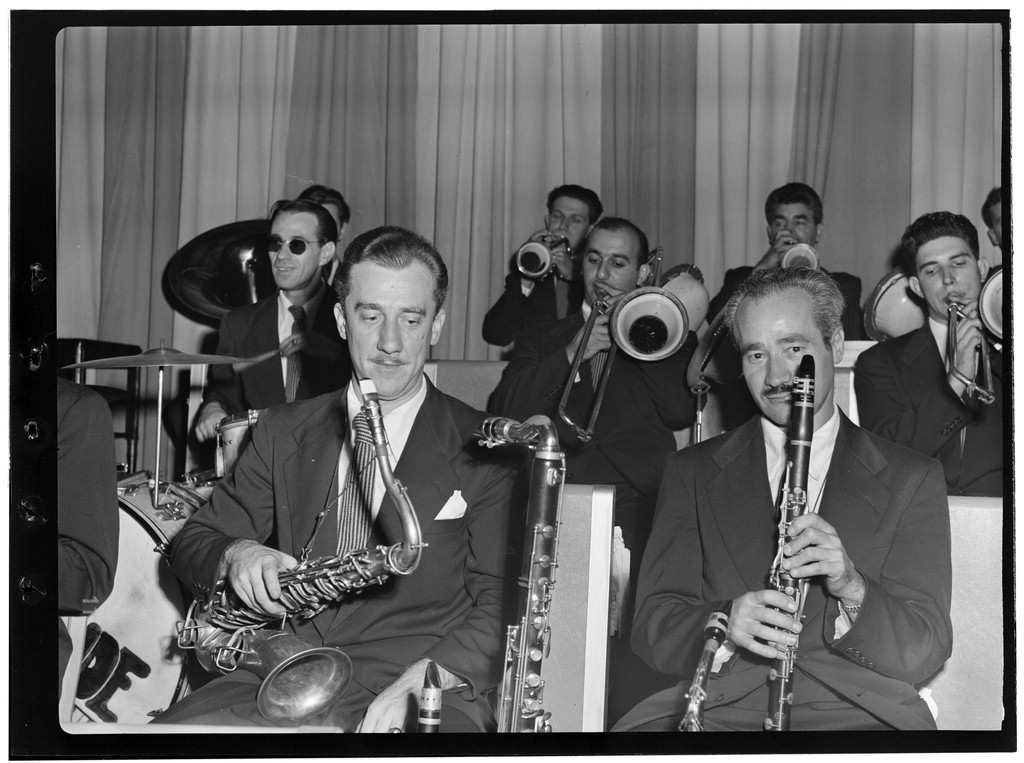
- Portrait of Micky Folus, Danny Polo, Billy Exiner, Vahe (Tak) Takvorian, and Al Langstaff, at Eddie Condon's, New York, ca. October 1947

Background information
- Born: Danny Pollo; December 22, 1901; Toluca, Illinois, U.S.
- Died: July 11, 1949 (aged 47) Chicago, Illinois, U.S.
- Genres: Jazz

Danny Pollo (December 22, 1901 – July 11, 1949), known professionally as Danny Polo, was an American jazz clarinetist.

== Life ==
Polo was born in Toluca, Illinois, and moved to Clinton, Indiana, as an infant, where his father worked as a coal miner. His father was also a clarinetist, and Danny learned to play from a young age, working in marching bands from age eight. In his youth he and Claude Thornhill had a duo. In the 1920s Polo played with Elmer Schoebel (1923), Merritt Brunies, Arnold Johnson, Ben Bernie, Jean Goldkette (1926), and Paul Ash. In 1927 he went to Europe with Dave Tough, where he played with several continental bandleaders including Bert Firman, Lud Gluskin, George Carhart, Ben Berlin and Arthur Briggs. From 1930 until 1935, Polo played with Ambrose, returning to the U.S. in December 1935. Polo particularly enjoyed living in Berlin, Germany, and stayed there for several years, even after Germany was taken over by the Nazi regime.

In 1938 Polo returned to Britain to play with Ambrose and in 1939 he worked with Ray Ventura in Paris. Late in 1939 he moved back to the U.S. permanently and spent the early 1940s working with Joe Sullivan, Jack Teagarden (1942, including on Bing Crosby's film Birth of the Blues), and Claude Thornhill. He led his own Midwestern territory band for a time, then returned to play with Thornhill in 1947. He recorded two sessions as a leader (which include Alix Combelle), both in Europe, in 1938–39, and played in several experimental sessions with Miles Davis around 1947–1948. While with Thornhill he became ill, and died rather suddenly on July 11, 1949, in Chicago. His death was caused by hemorrhages that resulted from a peptic ulcer. He was 47. His gravestone gives his correct name as Pollo.
