= Philippe Brun =

Philippe Brun may refer to:

- Philippe Brun (musician) (1908–1994), French jazz trumpeter
- Philippe Brun (politician) (born 1991), French politician
