= Walter Dobschinski =

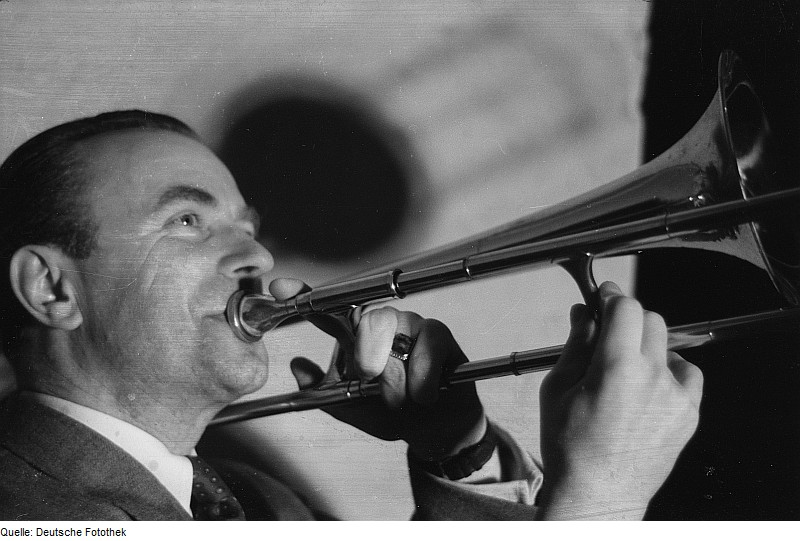
Walter Dobschinski

Walter Dobrzynski, better known as Walter Dobschinski (October 29, 1908, Berlin - February 16, 1996, Berlin) was a German jazz trombonist and bandleader.

== Background ==
During his time he was a member of Teddy Stauffer und seine Original Teddies.

Dobschinski received formal musical training on piano at the Berlin Conservatory, but concentrated on trombone once he became interested in jazz music. He played with Teddy Stauffer for most of the 1930s, including on tours of western Europe and on the ship SS Reliance. In 1939 he worked with Kurt Hohenberger, and was involved with the German Dance and Entertainment Orchestra during World War II. Following the war, he led a swing jazz ensemble for Berliner Rundfunk, recording extensively with this group; Rex Stewart appeared on some of these recordings. He continued leading ensembles in the 1950s, but in his later career he concentrated on arranging and composition.
