= Fred Böhler =

Swiss jazz pianist (1912–1995)

Alfred "Fred" Böhler (July 26, 1912, Zürich – January 10, 1995, Zumikon) was a Swiss jazz keyboardist and bandleader.

Böhler started on violin as a child but later switched to piano. He led his own ensemble starting in 1936, which featured Eddie Brunner and Hazy Osterwald, among others, as sidemen. This group made several tours of Switzerland during World War II and recorded copiously for Columbia Records. In 1943, Böhler conducted an orchestral ensemble that played symphonic jazz. While he recorded most often on piano, he also used Hammond organ early in a jazz context.
