= German Dance and Entertainment Orchestra =

Music ensemble in Nazi Germany

- Musical ensemble
- Native name: Deutsches Tanz- und Unterhaltungsorchester
- Short name: DTU
- Founded: 1942

The German Dance and Entertainment Orchestra (German: Deutsches Tanz- und Unterhaltungsorchester; DTU) was a musical ensemble formed in 1942 by musicians Franz Grothe and Georg Haentzschel on the initiative of Nazi propaganda minister Joseph Goebbels. It was an attempt to create an acceptable alternative to jazz, which was a popular genre among Germans but was considered a form of degenerate music by the Nazis due to its racial associations. The self-styled "rhythmic dance music" produced by the German Dance and Entertainment Orchestra was intended especially to satisfy the musical desires of military personnel, thus preventing them from listening to British radio broadcasts which also contained anti-Nazi propaganda material. Walter Dobschinski worked with the ensemble.
