= Philippe Brun (musician) =

French jazz trumpeter

Philippe Brun (April 29, 1908, Paris - January 15, 1994, Paris) was a French jazz trumpeter.

Brun first began playing professionally in the late 1920s with the bands of Gregor, Danny Polo, and Ray Ventura. In the early 1930s he worked in London with Bert Ambrose, Jack Hylton, and Fred Waring. Returning to Paris around 1936, he played with Jazz du Poste Parisien and with Ventura again, as well as with Alix Combelle where he doubled as a clarinetist on a 1937-1942 recording followed by Django Reinhardt, where he doubled a trombonist in the 1939-1940 recording. He also recorded as a leader from 1937 to 1940. During World War II he worked in Switzerland, with Eddie Brunner, André Ekyan, Edmond Cohanier, and Teddy Stauffer.

Brun was married to Annie Fratellini, a vocalist and comedian who also performed with Raymond Fol and Kenny Clarke.
