= Guy Paquinet =

French jazz trombonist (1903–1981)

Guy Patrick Paquinet (August 13, 1903, Tours - January 5, 1981, Selle-sur-le-Bied) was a French jazz trombonist.

Paquinet played in an army band in the early 1920s, then worked with Paul Gason, Lud Gluskin, Fred Mélé, and Don Parker. He led his own ensemble from 1934 to 1936, then worked as a sideman for Alix Combelle, Django Reinhardt, and Ray Ventura. In the 1940s he returned to bandleading, leading his own ensembles through the 1950s and working with, among others, Sidney Bechet, Dizzy Gillespie, and Tony Proteau.

Paquinet's son, André Paquinet, became a noteworthy jazz performer in his own right.
