= Cyril Trailor =

Welsh footballer

Cyril Trailer
Personal information
- Full name: Cyril Henry Trailer
- Date of birth: 15 May 1919
- Place of birth: Merthyr Tydfil, Wales
- Date of death: 28 August 1986 (aged 67)
- Place of death: Merthyr Tydfil, Wales
- Position: Wing half

Senior career*
Years	Team	Apps	(Gls)
????–1938	Northfleet United		
1938–1948	Tottenham Hotspur	11	(0)
1948–?	Leyton Orient	39	(?)
1950–1951	Bedford Town	46	(2)
- * Club domestic league appearances and goals

Cyril Henry Trailer (15 May 1919 – 28 August 1986) was a Welsh professional footballer who played for Northfleet United, Tottenham Hotspur, Leyton Orient, Bedford Town and represented Wales at schoolboy level.

== Playing career ==
Trailer impressed Tottenham Hotspur while playing for Wales schoolboys in 1932 and was invited to join the club's junior side. He later earned an amateur contract. At the age of 16 he signed professional forms with the club's "nursery" team Northfleet United. In October 1938 Trailor was offered a professional contract with the Spurs. During World War II he served with the Royal Artillery. He was wounded during the retreat from Dunkirk and returned to service after recovery. On several occasions he turned out for Tottenham in war–time matches. The wing half returned to the club in 1946 and went on to feature in 12 senior matches in all competitions. He also featured in 118 games and scored 24 goals at various levels at White Hart Lane. In August 1948 Leyton Orient paid £600 for his services where he notched up a further 39 appearances. After leaving Brisbane Road he joined Bedford Town where an ankle injury ended his competitive career after making 46 appearances and scoring two goals between 1950 and 1951.

== Post–playing career ==
After his football career had ended Trailer returned to his home town of Merthyr Tydfil where he was employed at the town's Hoover plant. Trailer died in Merthyr on 28 August 1986.
