= Edmond Cohanier =

Edmond Cohanier (born February 28, 1905, Talloires - death November 8, 2003), Geneva was a Swiss jazz reedist.

Cohanier worked in Paris for most of his early career, playing in the 1920s with Georges Marion, Paul Gason, Jack Purvis, and Gregor. Cohanier and Lucien Moraweck were bandmates in several ensembles. From 1931 to 1933 he was a clarinetist and saxophonist for Paris's Paramount theater, and during this decade also played with Jazz du Poste Parisien and in ensembles with Louis Armstrong, Bob Chrisler, Herb Flemming, Andy Foster, Lud Gluskin, Eddie Ritten, Wal-Berg (fr:Wal-Berg), and Tom Waltham. Around 1937, he returned to Switzerland, where he played with Philippe Brun, then left jazz to become a pedagogue at the Zurich Conservatory.
