= Lud Gluskin =

American drummer

Ludwig Elias "Lud" Gluskin (December 16, 1898 – October 13, 1989) was an American jazz drummer and bandleader.

== Biography ==
Ludwig Elias Gluskin was born in Manhattan as the first child of Elias Gluskin (31), a New York dentist, and his wife Rosa Epstein (21). Both parents were born in Russia. From 1911–1916, he attended public grade schools and DeWitt Clinton High School, where Gluskin met Jimmy Durante, with whom he formed a piano-drum combination for engagements at school events and private parties.

After touring Europe with Paul Whiteman's band, Gluskin stayed on in France where, in 1927, he was offered the leadership of The Playboys, a Detroit jazz band that had been stranded in Paris; he led the group in Venice in 1927 and Paris in 1928, eventually expanding it into his own orchestra. With this ensemble, Gluskin recorded more than 700 titles in Paris and Berlin and toured Europe extensively through 1933. His sidemen included Arthur Briggs, Faustin Jeanjean, Emile Christian, Leo Vauchant, Howard Mulvany, Edmond Cohanier, and Danny Polo.

The rise of Hitler made it difficult for Gluskin, a Jew, to find work in central Europe, and he eventually decided to leave the continent. Upon returning to the United States, Gluskin led dance bands and worked on radio. He took the position of director of music for CBS in 1937, working out of Hollywood, and led the orchestra on many programs, including The Orson Welles Almanac (1944).

During this period, he also worked as musical director for a number of films, including The Bashful Bachelor (1942) and Friendly Enemies (1942). Luskin was also the orchestral director for the Meet Corliss Archer radio show.

In the early 1950s, he provided music for The George Burns and Gracie Allen Show.

Upon retirement, he lived in Palm Springs, California.
