= Freddy Johnson =

American jazz pianist and singer (1904–1961)

Freddy Johnson c. 1943 – February 1944. Tittmoning, Bavaria, Germany.

Freddy Johnson (March 12, 1904 – March 24, 1961) was an American jazz pianist and singer who gained popularity in the 1930s playing mostly swing style.

== Biography ==
Johnson began playing professionally as Florence Mills' accompanist, and formed his own band in 1924. In 1925 he worked with Elmer Snowden, and in 1926 he worked with Billy Fowler. He briefly worked with Henri Saparo and Noble Sissle, and then he joined Sam Woodings band and traveled to Europe in June 1928.

Wooding and Johnson parted ways in 1929, and Johnson returned to Paris to do solo work. While he was in Paris, he with Arthur Briggs and put together a band. Between late 1933 and 1934 Johnson worked with Freddy Taylor's band, and then in February 1934 Johnson left Paris to work in Belgium and The Netherlands. In the mid 1930s he made some recordings with the Quintette du Hot Club de France.

While living in Amsterdam, he co-lead a band with Lex Van Spall, and they played regularly at the Negro Palace in a trio with Coleman Hawkins. He later worked at the Negro Palace, and then with Max Woiski in a club called La Cubana, in Amsterdam. He worked at this club until 11 December 1941, when he was arrested by the Nazis. He was interned in Bavaria from January 1942 until February 1944, when he was repatriated to the US.

After returning to the US, he worked with George James, then in 1944 joined Garvin Bushell's band in New York. In the later 40s and early 50s he worked mostly as a piano and voice coach, and also did some solo residencies at Well's New York. He returned to Europe in 1959 with the "Free and Easy" show, and then played for another three weeks in the Netherlands.

Soon after he became very ill with cancer, and after staying at a hospital in Copenhagen in autumn 1960, he returned to New York and stayed in St. Barnabas Hospital until his death.
