= Arthur Briggs (footballer) =

English footballer

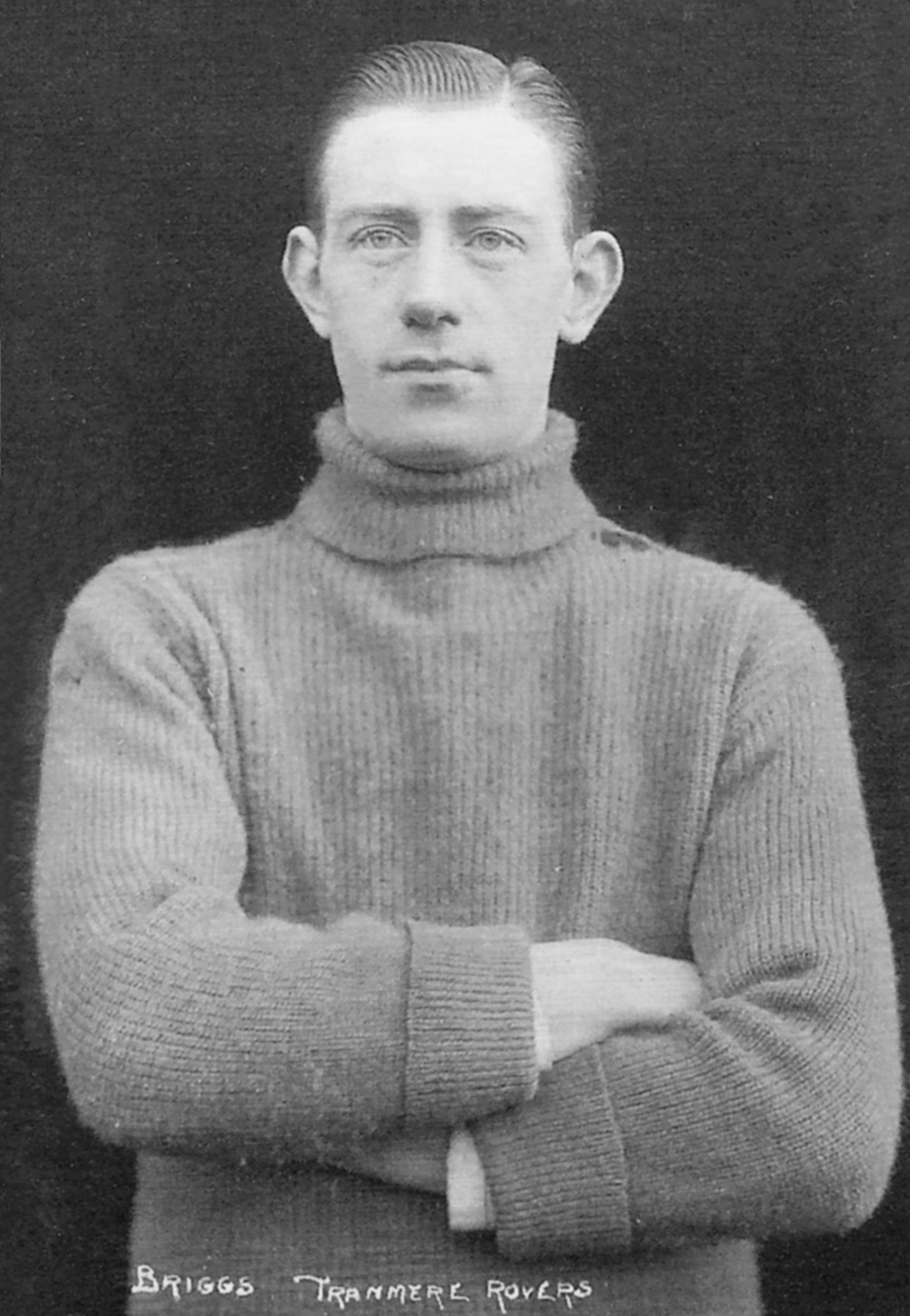
- Briggs in 1924

Personal information
- Date of birth: 27 May 1900
- Place of birth: Newcastle upon Tyne, England
- Date of death: 12 March 1987 (aged 86)
- Place of death: Penarth, Wales
- Height: 5 ft 11 in (1.80 m)
- Position: Goalkeeper

Senior career*
Years	Team	Apps	(Gls)
?–1924	Hull City	?	(?)
1924–1932	Tranmere Rovers	233	(0)
1932–?	Swindon Town	?	(?)
- * Club domestic league appearances and goals

Arthur Briggs (27 May 1900 – 12 March 1987) was an English footballer who played as a goalkeeper for Hull City, Tranmere Rovers and Swindon Town. He made 246 appearances for Tranmere.
