= Kurt Hohenberger =

German jazz trumpeter

Kurt Hohenberger (April 28, 1908 in Stuttgart – July 15, 1979 in Kernenstetten) was a German jazz trumpeter.

Hohenberger was a member of the Goldene Sieben from 1934 to 1939, and he performed and recorded with his own group in Berlin, which held a residence at the Quartier Latin club from 1937 to 1943. He also worked with Oscar Joost, Peter Kreuder, Teddy Stauffer, Peter Igelhoff, Willy Berking, and Bimbo Weiland during the same period, both live and on recordings. Hohenberger did a stint in the military late in World War II and following this recorded with a swing big band in the late 1940s. From 1949-1951 he lived in Brazil, then returned to Germany and recorded again as a bandleader. His last performances were in the late 1950s.
