= Ray Ventura (pianist) =

French jazz pianist and bandleader (1908–1979)

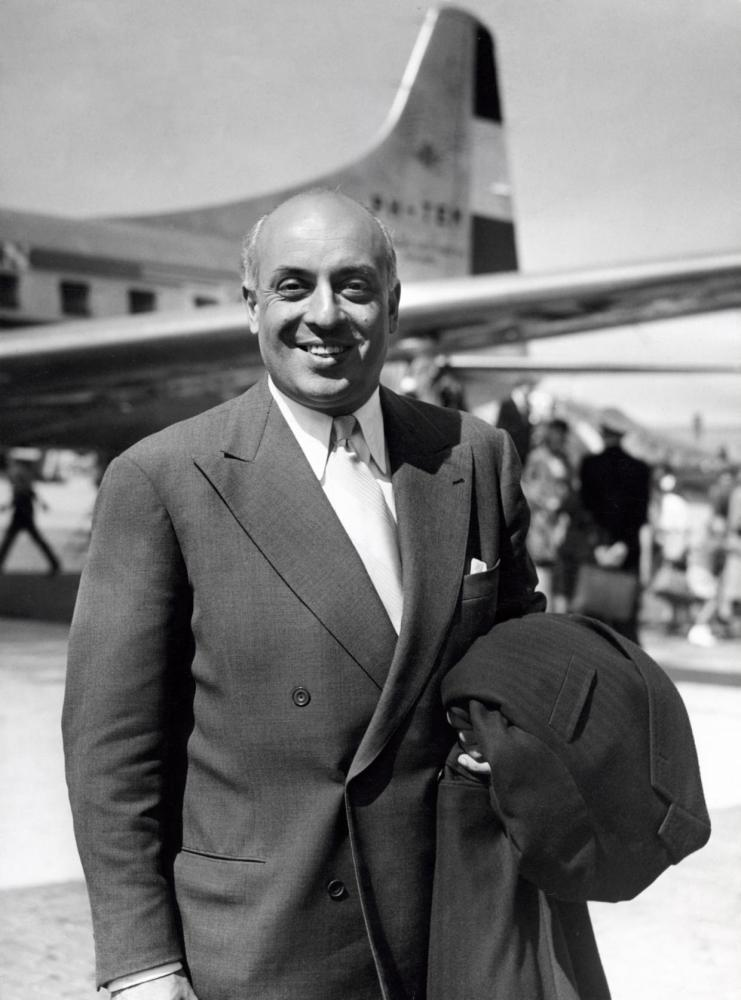
Ray Ventura

Raymond Ventura (16 April 1908, Paris, France – 29 March 1979, Palma de Mallorca, Spain) was a French jazz pianist and bandleader. He helped popularize jazz in France in the 1930s. His nephew was singer Sacha Distel.

== Career ==
Ventura was born to a Jewish family. In 1925 he was the pianist for the Collegiate Five, which recorded as the Collegians for Columbia beginning in 1928 and for Decca in the 1930s. A year later he led the band, and it became a dance orchestra resembling a big band. His sidemen included Alix Combelle, Philippe Brun, and Guy Paquinet. In the early 1940s he led a big band in South America and in France during the rest of the decade.

One of his band's popular songs from 1936 was "Tout va très bien, Madame la Marquise" in which the Marquise is told by her servants that everything is fine at home except for a series of escalating calamities. It was seen as a metaphor for France's obliviousness to the approaching war.

== Filmography ==
- American Love (1931)
- Beautiful Star (1938)
- Whirlwind of Paris (1939)
- Prince Bouboule (1939)
- King Pandora (1950)
- Never Two Without Three (1951)
- Desperate Decision (1952)
- Women of Paris (1953)
- A Hundred Francs a Second (1953)
- Open Letter (1953)
- Stopover in Orly (1955)
- The Hotshot (1955)
- Forgive Us Our Trespasses (1956)
