= Michel Warlop =

French classical and jazz violinist (1911–1947)

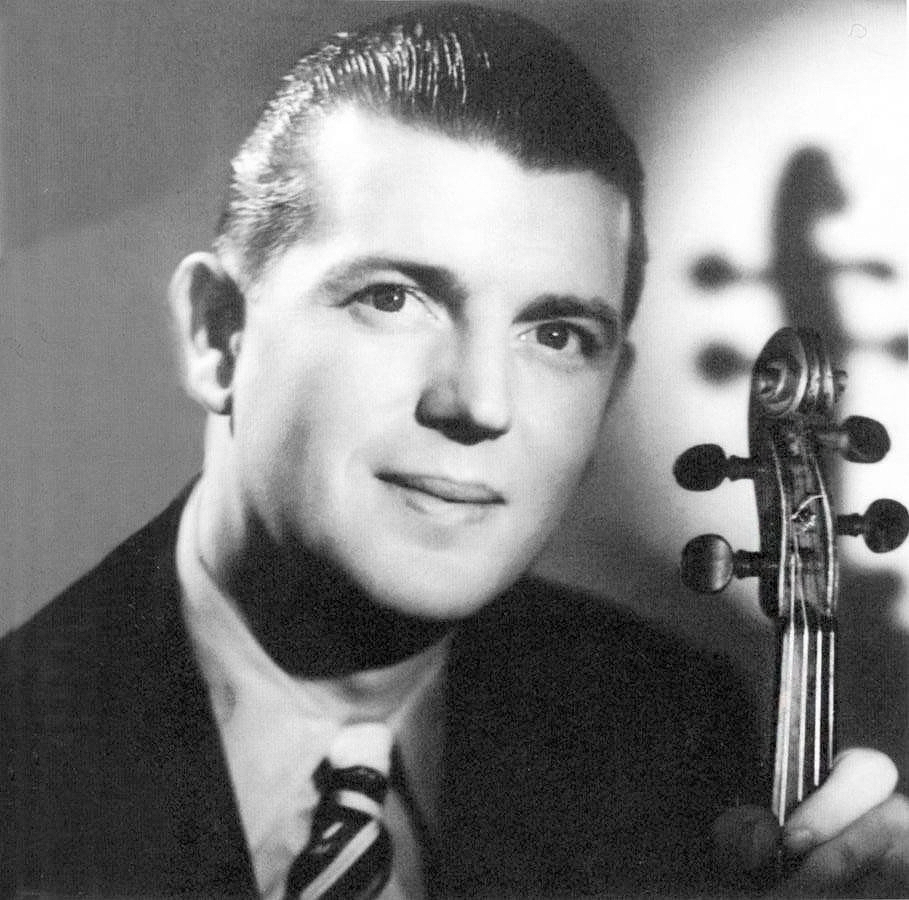
- Born: 23 January 1911
- Died: 6 March 1947 (aged 36)
- Education: Conservatoire de Paris
- Occupation: violinist
- Spouse: Fernande ('Nandette') Richard

Michel Maurice Armand Warlop (23 January 1911 – 6 March 1947) was a French classical and jazz violinist professionally active from 1929 to 1947.

== Early life and education ==
Michel Warlop (Michou to his friends) was a child prodigy who began musical studies with his mother, a music professor, and entered the Conservatory of Douai, the second oldest in France, aged six.

There he was a student of Victor Gallois who had won the Prix de Rome for composition in 1905. Aged seven, he performed his first public concert accompanied by his mother on piano in Douai. Aged eight in 1919 he played his first concert in Paris, to benefit victims of World War I. He transferred to the Conservatory of Lille around the age of 10 and started his studies at the Conservatoire de Paris (university level) aged 13.

== Work with the Raymond Legrand Orchestra ==
In mid-1939, Warlop started working as a permanent member of the Raymond Legrand Orchestra, the most popular big band in France during the early to mid-1940s. Warlop was called up for military service in September 1939 and left Paris. Soon after hostilities started between Germany and France he became a German prisoner of war. He was later released because of his tuberculosis and returned to France late in February 1941.

After a visit home he went to Paris and took up his old chair in Legrand's orchestra. He also recorded with the Jazz Dixit and his own Septuor à Cordes (string septet) from time to time. Both of these units were made up of other musicians in the Legrand organization. The septet was very unusual in having four violins (including Warlop), two guitars and a string bass as its basic makeup. From time to time there was also a piano, drums and even a harp but not all appeared on each recording.

Warlop wrote and arranged almost all of the Septuor's music which was in a style that blended a classical string setting with Warlop's jazz abilities. In 1942, he recorded his own Swing Concerto, which was made with a large concert orchestra. It took up both sides of a 30 cm/ 12 inch 78 RPM disc that ran for seven and a half minutes. Disques Swing did not issue it and it sat in the vaults until it was finally released on a CD in 1989. The work showed off Warlop's skills in both the classical and jazz realms but Swing feared that the mix of classical and jazz styles would not be well received.

Another violinist, Pierre Darrieux, recorded the same work with the same orchestra on the Columbia label about a year later. It was released to the public but did not sell in the hoped for numbers. The same session that produced Warlop's performance of Swing Concerto also produced Le Noël du Prisonnier (A Prisoner's Christmas), another longer work that was released on both sides of a Columbia 12 inch/ 30 cm record rather than on Disques Swing. Both Noël du Prisonnier and Darrieux's rendition of Swing Concerto only sold a few hundred copies each and both discs are highly sought after by collectors today as they have never been re-issued.

Legrand's orchestra was extremely busy during the war years with recordings, broadcasts and touring around France for personal appearances. During 1941, Legrand's orchestra made a movie called Mademoiselle Swing, released in 1942 with singer Irène de Trebert. Warlop was the middle of the three violin players in the band for the film and can be heard on short solos in several instances. The film is available on DVD in France and only in French. In July and August 1942, Legrand's orchestra visited Germany and played for French war prisoners and laborers that were working there. They did not play for the German public or military during this tour or on German radio. Late in 1943, Warlop made his last recordings as a leader but stayed active in music, continuing on with Raymond Legrand.

== Post-war period ==
After the war many French musicians, singers and film stars were accused of supporting the enemy by appearing on German-controlled radio, playing for German troops, or touring in Germany. Many were banned from working for a time. Warlop had to sit out for two months and Legrand for one year. He never played again in Paris or recorded after 1945.

Despite his abilities in classical music, which would have gained him a good position in any classical orchestra in France, Warlop preferred to tour as a jazz soloist and in small groups in the south of France. His last engagement was with Jimmy Réna's small group at the Grand Hotel Superbagnières above Luchon, France in the Pyrenees near the border with Spain. His tuberculosis finally caught up with him, along with his heavy consumption of alcohol and cocaine. He died at the age of 36 in 1947.

== Family ==
Warlop was married to and later divorced from Fernande ('Nandette') Richard; the couple did not have any children. He also had no brothers or sisters. A few of his distant cousins are alive today, living in or near Douai, France. He is buried in the left (when coming from the center of Luchon) of the three cemeteries (all are next to each other) on the outskirts of Luchon, France.
