= Eddie Brunner =

Eduard "Eddie" Brunner (July 19, 1912, Zürich – July 18, 1960, Zürich) was a Swiss jazz reedist and bandleader.

Brunner learned to play clarinet, piano, and tenor and alto saxophone, and began playing professionally in the early 1930s with Rene Dumont, Jack and Louis de Vries, and Marek Weber. In 1936 he moved to Paris and recorded under his own name as well as with the Goldene Sieben and Louis Bacon; he moved back to Switzerland once the war had begun. He joined Teddy Stauffer's band, and in 1941 took over leadership of the group until 1947, when it dissolved. He led a new six-piece ensemble in 1948, and recorded for radio and television broadcasts in the 1950s.
