= Arthur Briggs (musician) =

Grenadian jazz trumpeter and orchestra leader (1901–1991)

- Born: James Arthur Briggs; April 9, 1901; St. George's, Grenada
- Died: July 15, 1991 (aged 90) Paris, France
- Genre: Jazz
- Occupations: Musician, bandleader
- Instrument: Trumpet
- Years active: c. 1919–1960s

James Arthur Briggs (April 9, 1901 Grenada – July 15, 1991, Paris) was a British Caribbean jazz trumpeter and orchestra leader who performed in Europe.

== Career ==
Briggs was born in St. George's on the Caribbean island of Grenada on April 9, 1901, the youngest of ten children. He studied music with Will Marion Cook at the Martin-Smith School of Music.

He played the trumpet and eventually joined the 369th US Infantry Band. He was actually under age and moved his date of birth back to 1899. He was still considered too young to travel to Europe during the first World War. Briggs finally traveled to Europe in June of 1919 while playing with Will Marion Cook and his Southern Syncopated Orchestra.

Admired for his technical virtuosity and clear tone, he worked in the United States and Europe for 10 years before eventually settling in Europe in 1931. He set up a band with Freddy Johnson and worked with artists all over Europe, including Coleman Hawkins and Django Reinhardt.

=== Imprisonment ===
At the start of World War II Briggs, as a British passport holder, was interned in the SS Polizeihaftlager for political prisoners near Compiègne. The British jazz musician Tom Waltham who was interned at the Camp des Internés Britanniques in Saint-Denis, petitioned the German authorities to have Briggs moved there and this was granted. There Briggs and Waltham were at the heart of the camp's musical activities. Jazz was forbidden in the camp so the interned jazz musicians, many of African heritage, turned to playing classical music. A printed program survives of a 1942 Concert Symphonique including works by Albeniz, Granados, de Falla, Mozart, Handel, Franck and Liszt. Tom Waltham directed "Arthur Briggs et son Orchestre" (pp. 93–181 in Ref.). The concerts were a success and were popular with German officers.

After the Liberation of Paris, Briggs organized and led his own bands.

=== Later life ===
In the 1960s, Briggs settled in Chantilly and he taught music. He died in 1991 in Paris.

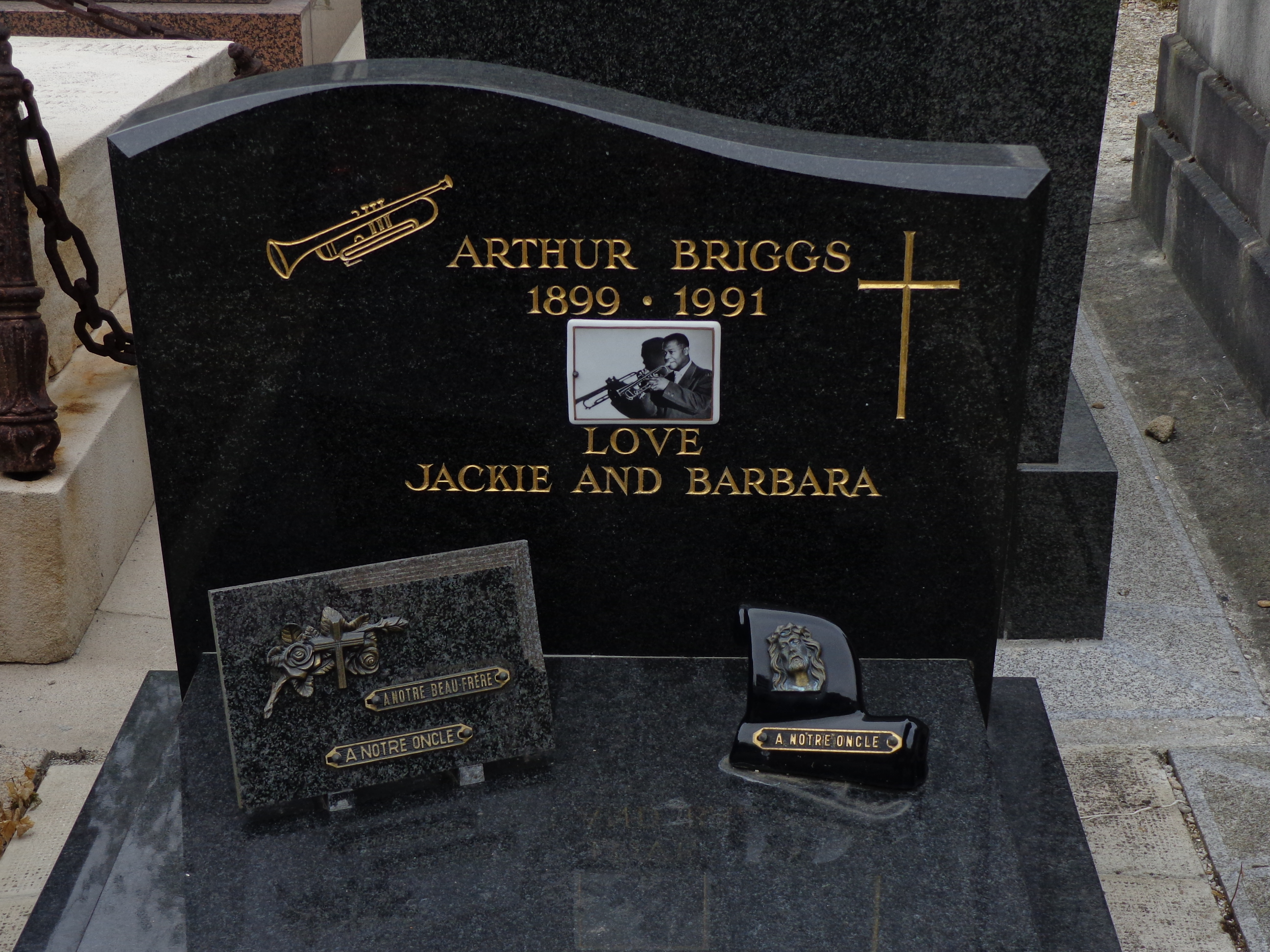
Grave of Arthur Briggs, Montmartre Cemetery, Paris.

== Recordings ==
Recordings of Briggs are very rare, but he recorded with both Deutsche Grammophon and Clausophon extensively throughout the mid-late 1920s. Briggs can be heard very clearly on the 1935 record of "Blue Moon", with Coleman Hawkins and Django Reinhardt.

Briggs was not a relative of tubist Pete Briggs who recorded with Louis Armstrong.

== See also ==
- List of jazz trumpeters
