= Teddy Stauffer =

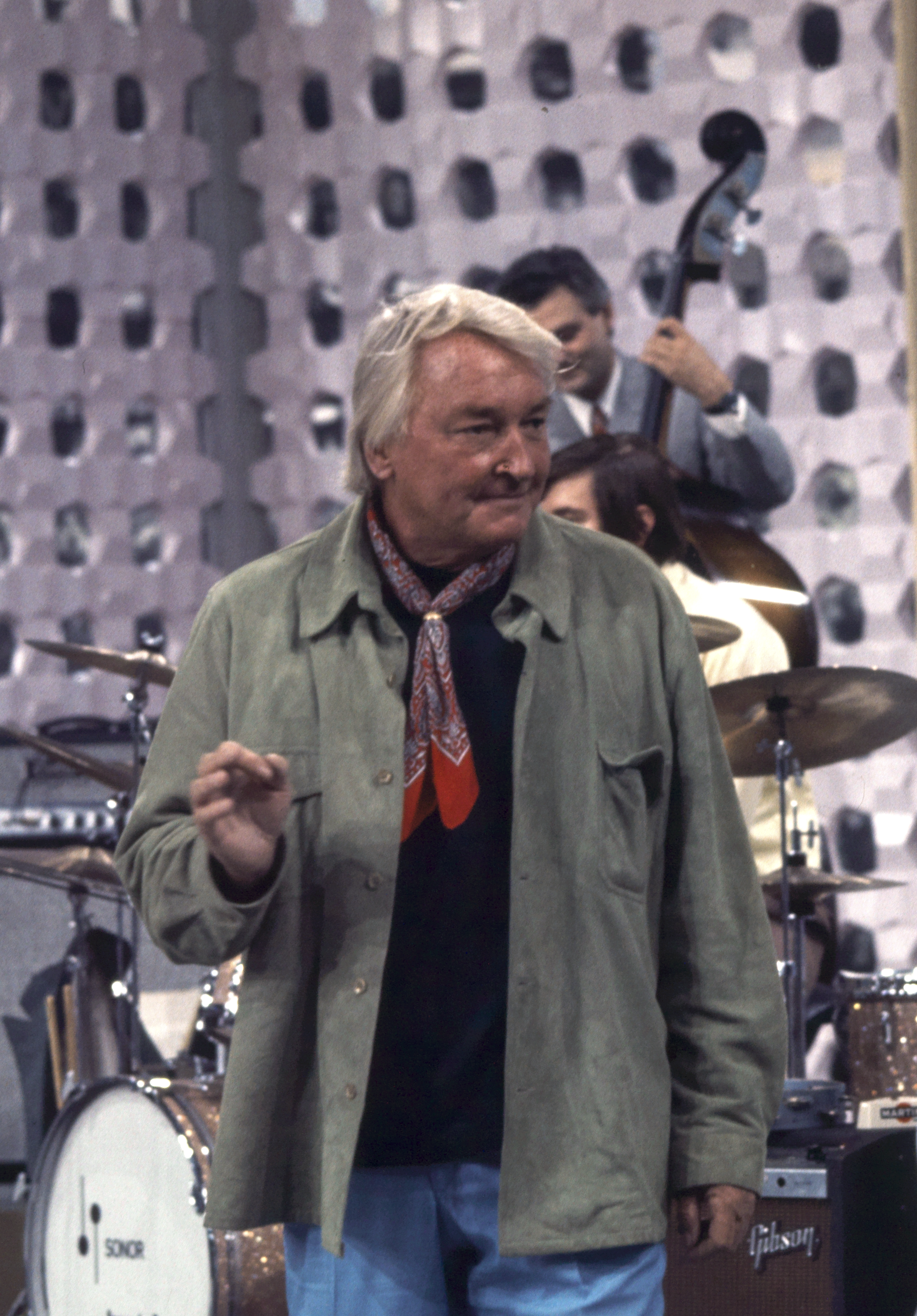

Background information
- Also known as: Ernest Henry Stauffer; Teddy-Stauffer-Septett
- Born: Ernst Heinrich Stauffer; 2 May 1909; Murten, Fribourg, Switzerland
- Died: 27 August 1991 (aged 82) Acapulco, Guerrero, Mexico
- Genre: Jazz
- Occupations: Bandleader; musician; actor; nightclub owner; restaurateur
- Instruments: Violin; saxophone

Ernst Heinrich "Teddy" Stauffer (2 May 1909 – 27 August 1991) was a Swiss bandleader, musician, actor, nightclub owner, and restaurateur. He was dubbed Germany's "swing-king" of the 1930s. He formed the band known as the Teddies (also known as the Original Teddies or the International Teddies), which continued after he left in 1941.

== Life and career ==
=== Teddy Stauffer Und Seine Original Teddies ===
Stauffer led Teddy Sfauffer und seine Original Teddies which included members, Walter Dobschinski , Rudi Dumont, Kurt Hohenberger, Ernst Höllerhagen, Bob Huber, Kurt Hohenberger, Andre Schuster and Franz Thon.

After founding his "Original Teddies" band in Bern, Stauffer enjoyed great success in Berlin, especially during the 1936 Olympic Games. Annual trips to St. Moritz and Arosa, and a guest appearance in London, enhanced the international reputation of the Teddies band. The band recorded for the Telefunken label and made successful recordings of Big Band standards such as "Goody Goody" and "Jeepers Creepers," often featuring Swiss vocalist Billy Toffel. With his jazzy swing music, however, Stauffer increasingly got in trouble with the Reichsmusikkammer.

=== Further activities ===
With the outbreak of war in 1939, Stauffer returned to his native Switzerland.

After the war, he emigrated to the United States and later to Acapulco, Mexico, where he became a hotel manager and remained until his death in 1991. During the 1950s, Stauffer became a key figure in the promotion of Acapulco as a resort for a wealthy and celebrity clientele, and was nicknamed "Mr. Acapulco." He made guest appearances in several films, usually playing himself or a bandleader character. Stauffer was married five times, including brief marriages to actresses Faith Domergue and Hedy Lamarr.

== Bibliography ==
- Stauffer, Teddy, Forever is a Hell of a Long Time: An Autobiography (1976) ISBN 0-8092-8089-2
