= Karl Reitz =

German violist (1887–1943)

- Born: 31 January 1887; Cologne, German Empire
- Died: 10 February 1943 (aged 56); Berlin, Nazi Germany
- Occupations: Classical violinist; Academic teacher
- Organizations: Orchestra of the Berlin State Opera; Busch Quartet; Deman String Quartet

Karl Reitz (31 January 1887 – 10 February 1943) was a German violist. From 1922 until his death, he was principal violist of the Prussian State Orchestra of the Berlin Royal Court Opera (now Staatskapelle Berlin). He was known as violist in notable string quartets such as the Busch Quartet and the Deman String Quartet, regarded as one of the most renowned chamber music players of his time.

== Life ==
Reitz was born in Cologne as the first child of Carl Reitz and his wife Juliane née Meister, from the Koblenz Meister family of art dealers (see also Simon Meister). From 1922 until his death in 1943, he held the position of principal violist of the Prussian State Orchestra of the Berlin Royal Court Opera (now Staatskapelle Berlin). With the orchestra, he was a soloist in a recording of Don Quichote by Richard Strauss in 1933, conducted by the composer and with Enrico Mainardi as the cellist.

=== Chamber music ensembles ===
From 1919 to 1921, Reitz played a major role in shaping the Busch Quartet which had been founded in 1913 by Primarius Adolf Busch, a brother of the conductor Fritz Busch, and developed into one of the most important and influential string quartets of the first half of the 20th century until it was disbanded in 1952. Other musicians in this quartet were Fritz Rothschild (1913), Gösta Andreasson (1921–45), Ernest Drucker (1946) and Bruno Straumann (1946–52) on 2nd violin. The viola was played by Karl Doktor (1913), Emil Bohnke (1919–21), again Karl Doktor (1921–45) and Hugo Gottesmann (1946–52). The cellists were Paul Grümmer (1913–30) and Hermann Busch (1930–52). The friendship with Emil Bohnke led Reitz to spend some time around 1920 with his family living with the latter's father-in-law Franz von Mendelssohn in the Palais Mendelssohn in Berlin-Grunewald.

Subsequently, Reitz was violist in the Deman String Quartet, with violinists Rudolf Deman and Emil Kornsand, and cellist Carl Dechert. They made recordings for Deutsche Grammophon (DG) and Polydor. Works for DG included Beethoven's string quartets No. 4, Op. 18.4, No. 9, Op. 59.3, and Nr. 15, Op. 132, further Carl Ditters von Dittersdorf's quartet in E flat major, Alexander Glazunov's Interlude, Mozart's String Quartet No. 18, K. 464, and works by Schubert, quartets No. 10, D. 87, No. 13, D. 804, No. 14, D. 810, and five German Dances.

In 1937, Reitz succeeded Karla Höcker as viola player in the Bruinier Quartet, named after its founder and primarius August Heinrich Bruinier. Other members were initially Marg. Schmidt-Laipa, later Fritz Wehmeyer (2nd violin) and cellist Hans Chemin-Petit followed by Paul Blumenfeld as well as Dechert. After Reitz died, the Bruinier Quartet disbanded in 1944, also due to the war.

== Family ==
Karl Reitz had a brother, Hans Walter Reitz (1888–1955), who was a representative of the Neues Bauen style in Germany, and who was portrayed several times by August Sander. Karl Reitz met the painter Albert Aereboe whom he commissioned around 1917 to design the living room at 59a Holtenauer Strasse in Kiel (Brunswick) with murals and integrated paintings, watercolours and drawings to create an interior. The furniture was made according to designs by Hans Walter Reitz. This work has not survived, nor has the villa at Kranzallee 55 in Berlin-Westend, which Hans Walter Reitz later designed for his brother, but which was destroyed during one of the bombings of Berlin.

Reitz was first married to the violinist Henni Marie Reitz, née Kähler (1891–1973). His second wife was Hildegard Reitz, née Ehlers (1896–1989); the couple had four children.

Reitz died in Berlin at age 56.
