= Orchestral suites (Bach) =

Four suites by Johann Sebastian Bach

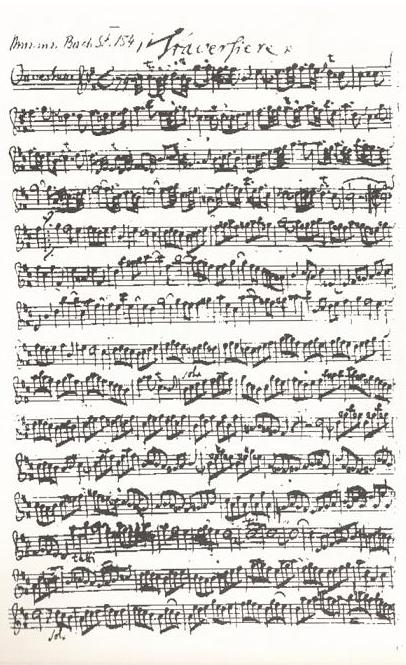
Bach's autograph of the traversière part of the second orchestral suite (BWV 1067)

The four orchestral suites BWV 1066–1069 (called ouvertures by their composer) are four suites by Johann Sebastian Bach from the years 1724–1731. The name ouverture refers only in part to the opening movement in the style of the French overture, in which a majestic opening section in relatively slow dotted-note rhythm in duple meter is followed by a fast fugal section, then rounded off with a short recapitulation of the opening music.

More broadly, the term was used in Baroque Germany for a suite of dance-pieces in French Baroque style preceded by such an ouverture. This genre was extremely popular in Germany during Bach's day, and he showed far less interest in it than was usual: Robin Stowell writes that "Telemann's 135 surviving examples [represent] only a fraction of those he is known to have written"; Christoph Graupner left 85; and Johann Friedrich Fasch left almost 100.

Bach did write several other ouverture (suites) for solo instruments, notably the Cello Suite no. 5, BWV 1011, which also exists in the autograph Lute Suite in G minor, BWV 995, the Keyboard Partita no. 4 in D, BWV 828, and the Overture in the French style, BWV 831 for keyboard. The two keyboard works are among the few Bach published, and he prepared the lute suite for a "Monsieur Schouster", presumably for a fee, so all three may attest to the form's popularity.

Scholars believe that Bach did not conceive of the four orchestral suites as a set (in the way he conceived of the Brandenburg Concertos), since the sources are various, as detailed below.

The Bach-Werke-Verzeichnis catalogue includes a fifth suite, BWV 1070 in G minor. However, this work is highly unlikely to have been composed by J. S. Bach.

Gustav Mahler arranged portions of BWV 1067 and 1068 for orchestra, harpsichord, and organ. They were played several times during Mahler's first tour of the New York Philharmonic, with Mahler on harpsichord and Harry Jepson on organ. The Italian composer Giuseppe Martucci (1856–1909) also prepared transcriptions of three of the suites (BWV 1066, 1067, and 1068) for solo piano.

== Suite No. 1 in C major, BWV 1066 ==
Overture of Orchestral Suite No. 1, BWV 1066, performed by The Adolf Busch Chamber Players conducted by Adolf Busch (1930s monaural recording)
Overture (part 1 of 2)

Overture (part 2 of 2)

The source is a set of parts from Leipzig in 1724–45 copied by C. G. Meissner.

1. Ouverture (In C major. Metrical sign of opening section; metrical sign of fugal section is $\boldsymbol{2}\!\!\!|\;$)
2. Courante (In C major. Metrical sign of 3/2)
3. Gavotte I/II (In C major. Metrical sign is $\boldsymbol{2}\!\!\!|\;$)
4. Forlane (In C major. Metrical sign is 6/4)
5. Menuet I/II (In C major. Metrical sign is 3/4)
6. Bourrée I/II (Bourrée I in C major & Bourrée II, the middle section, in C minor. Metrical sign is $\boldsymbol{2}\!\!\!|\;$)
7. Passepied I/II (In C major. Metrical sign is 3/4)

Instrumentation: Oboe I/II, bassoon, violin I/II, viola, basso continuo

== Suite No. 2 in B minor, BWV 1067 ==
From Orchestral Suite No. 2, BWV 1067, performed by Marcel Moyse (flute) with The Adolf Busch Chamber Players conducted by Adolf Busch (1930s monaural recording)
Movements 4 (Bourrée I/II) and 5 (Polonaise)

Movements 6 (Minuet) and 7 (Badinerie)

7. "Badinerie"
From Musopen

The source is a partially autograph set of parts (Bach wrote out those for flute and viola) from Leipzig in 1738–39.

1. Ouverture (In B minor. Metrical sign of the opening section is; metrical sign of fugal section is $\boldsymbol{2}\!\!\!|\;$; metrical sign of ending section, marked Lentement, is 3/4)
2. Rondeau – written Rondeaux by Bach (In B minor. Metrical sign is)
3. Sarabande (In B minor. Metrical sign is 3/4), with a canon at the 12th between the flute (plus first violins) and the bass
4. Bourrée I/II (In B minor. Metrical sign is)
5. Polonaise / Double (In B minor. Metrical sign for both is 3/4); the flute part is marked "Moderato e staccato" and the first violin part "lentement" (slowly)
6. Menuet (In B minor. Metrical sign is 3/4)
7. Badinerie (In B minor. Metrical sign is 2/4). Bach, in the autograph part, spells this "Battinerie".

Instrumentation: Solo "[Flute] traversière" (transverse flute), violin I/II, viola, basso continuo.

The Polonaise is a stylization of the Polish folk song "Wezmę ja kontusz" (I'll take my nobleman's robe). The Badinerie (literally "jesting" in French – in other works Bach used the Italian word with the same meaning, scherzo) has become a showpiece for solo flautists because of its quick pace and difficulty. For many years in the 1980s and early 1990s the movement was the incidental music for ITV Schools morning programmes in the UK.

=== Earlier version in A minor ===
Joshua Rifkin has argued, based on in-depth analysis of the partially autograph primary sources, that this work is based on an earlier version in A minor in which the solo flute part was scored instead for solo violin. Rifkin demonstrates that notational errors in the surviving parts can best be explained by their having been copied from a model a whole tone lower, and that this solo part would venture below the lowest pitches on the flutes Bach wrote for (the transverse flute, which Bach called flauto traverso or flute traversière). Rifkin argues that the violin was the most likely option, noting that in writing the word "Traversiere" in the solo part, Bach seems to have fashioned the letter T out of an earlier "V", suggesting that he originally intended to write the word "violin" (the page in question can be viewed here, p. 6). Further, Rifkin notes passages that would have used the violinistic technique of bariolage. Rifkin also suggests that Bach was inspired to write the suite by a similar work by his second cousin Johann Bernhard Bach.

Flautist Steven Zohn accepts the argument of an earlier version in A minor, but suggests that the original part may have been playable on flute as well as violin.

Oboist Gonzalo X. Ruiz has argued in detail that the solo instrument in the lost original A minor version was the oboe, and he has recorded it in his own reconstruction of that putative original on a baroque oboe. His case against the violin is that: the range is "curiously limited" for that instrument, "avoiding the G string almost entirely", and that the supposed violin solo would at times be lower in pitch than the first violin part, something that is almost unheard of in dedicated violin concertos. By contrast, "the range is exactly the range of Bach's oboes"; scoring the solo oboe occasionally lower than the first violin was typical Baroque practice, as the oboe still comes through to the ear; and the "figurations are very similar to those found in many oboe works of the period."

== Suite No. 3 in D major, BWV 1068 ==
Orchestral Suite No. 3, BWV 1068, performed by The Adolf Busch Chamber Players conducted by Adolf Busch (1930s monaural recording)
Overture (part 1 of 2)

Overture (part 2 of 2)

2. Air

3. Gavotte I/II

4. Bourrée – 5. Gigue

The oldest source is a partially autograph set of parts from around 1730. Bach wrote out the first violin and continuo parts, C. P. E. Bach wrote out the trumpet, oboe, and timpani parts, and J. S. Bach's student Johann Ludwig Krebs wrote out the second violin and viola parts. Rifkin has argued that the original was a version for strings and continuo alone.

1. Ouverture (In D major. Metrical sign is for the opening section; metrical sign is $\boldsymbol{2}$ fugal section, in which the autograph first violin part is marked "vite" (fast); metrical sign for final section)
2. Air (In D major. Metrical sign is)
3. Gavotte I/II (In D major. Metrical sign is)
4. Bourrée (In D major. Metrical sign is)
5. Gigue (In D major. Metrical sign is 6/8)

Instrumentation: Trumpet I/II/III, timpani, oboe I/II, violin I/II, viola, basso continuo (second movement: only strings and continuo).

An arrangement of the second movement of the suite by German violinist August Wilhelmj (1845–1908) became known as "Air on the G String".

== Suite No. 4 in D major, BWV 1069 ==
From Orchestral Suite No. 4, BWV 1069, performed by The Adolf Busch Chamber Players conducted by Adolf Busch (1930s monaural recording)
First part of the Overture

The source is lost, but the existing parts date from circa 1730. Rifkin has argued that the lost original version was written during Bach's tenure at Köthen, did not have trumpets or timpani, and that Bach first added these parts when adapting the Ouverture movement for the choral first movement to his 1725 Christmas cantata Unser Mund sei voll Lachens, BWV 110 ("Our mouths be full of laughter").

1. Ouverture (In D major. Metrical sign is for the opening section, 9/8 for the fast fugal section)
2. Bourrée I/II (Bourrée I in D major & Bourrée II, the middle section, in B minor. Metrical sign is)
3. Gavotte (In D major. Metrical sign is)
4. Menuet I/II (In D major. Metrical sign is 3/4)
5. Réjouissance (In D major. Metrical sign is 3/4)

Instrumentation: Trumpet I/II/III, timpani, oboe I/II/III, bassoon, violin I/II, viola, basso continuo.
