= Leslie Parnas =

American classical cellist (1931–2022)

Leslie Parnas

Leslie Parnas (November 11, 1931 – February 1, 2022) was an American classical cellist. A prize winner at several international music competitions, he appeared as a soloist with orchestras around the world and performed and recorded a number of chamber works. His playing has been described as "characterized by a sure technique and an aggressive approach to phrasing". For a number of years, he taught at the Boston University School of Music.

== Early life ==
Born to Ely and Etta Parnas in St. Louis, Missouri, in 1931, Leslie Parnas was one of several musically gifted siblings. He began taking piano lessons when he was 5 years old, then switched to cello at the age of 8. At 14 he made his solo debut with the St. Louis Symphony Orchestra, and at 16 he traveled to Philadelphia to study at the Curtis Institute of Music, where he was taught by Gregor Piatigorsky from 1948 to 1953.

== Career ==
From 1954 to 1962, Parnas was the principal cellist of the St. Louis Symphony Orchestra. In the late 1950s and early 1960s, he was awarded prizes in several international competitions, including the Prix Pablo Casals at the Paris International Cello Competition in 1957 and the Trofeo Primavera in the Italian radio network competition in 1959. At the Paris competition, he met the conductor and cellist Sir John Barbirolli, who was serving as a juror, and asked him about Edward Elgar's Cello Concerto, which was little known in the United States and which Parnas had never heard. After going over a score with Barbirolli, Parnas played the piece to such effect that Barbirolli said, "Would you believe that he read it and played it, including all the difficult passages, better than many I have heard to have studied it for years." In 1959 he made his New York recital debut, playing works by Bach, Beethoven, Debussy, and Brahms in a performance that "revealed an appreciation of diverse styles" and showed his ability to "manage a wide variety of hues".

Parnas was presented with the 1957 Prix Pablo Casals by Pablo Casals himself, and thereafter Parnas and Casals became friends and frequent collaborators. When Casals died in 1973, Parnas was a pallbearer at his funeral.

After he shared second prize in the prestigious International Tchaikovsky Competition in Moscow in 1962, Parnas was increasingly in demand as a soloist and recitalist. He performed as a soloist with such orchestras as the New York Philharmonic, the Philadelphia Orchestra, the National Symphony Orchestra, the Philharmonisches Staatsorchester Hamburg, and the Moscow and Leningrad orchestras; and he was invited to participate in a number of music festivals, including the Marlboro festival, the Spoleto Festival USA, and the Casals festivals in Prado, Spain, and in Puerto Rico.

In 1967, 1970, 1972, 1973, 1975, 1978, and 1993, he was a featured performer in the Naumburg Orchestral Concerts in the Naumburg Bandshell, Central Park, New York City. In 1969, he became a founding member of the Chamber Music Society of Lincoln Center, with which he frequently performed and recorded. For 12 years, from 1973 to 1985, he served as the artistic director of the Kneisel Hall chamber music school and festival. He was a juror for the International Tchaikovsky Competition in 1990 and again in 1995.

Parnas especially enjoyed performing in the Soviet Union, to which he made several concert tours, appreciating the reponsiveness of the audiences and the opportunity to improve Soviet–American relations. By the time of a tour in 1978, during which he performed in Minsk, Vilnius, Tallinn, and Leningrad, he and his wife had gained a fair proficiency in the Russian language.

From 1963 to 2013, Parnas was on the faculty of the Boston University School of Music. After retiring, he moved to a rehabilitation facility in Florida, where he died on February 1, 2022, at the age of 90.

== Instrument ==
After he acquired it in 1955, Parnas's principal instrument was the "Rosette" cello made by Matteo Goffriller in 1698.

== Partial discography ==
- Beethoven: Triple Concerto (with Rudolf Serkin, piano; Jaime Laredo, violin; Marlboro Festival Orchestra, Alexander Schneider, cond.), Columbia Masterworks MS 6564 (1964)
- Schubert: "Trout" Quintet (with Rudolf Serkin, piano; Jaime Laredo, violin; Philipp Naegele, viola; Julius Levine, bass), Columbia Masterworks MS 7067 (1967)
- Brahms: Piano Quartets, Complete (with Alexander Schneider, violin; Walter Trampler, viola; Stephanie Brown, piano), Vanguard VSD 71221, 71222 (1978)
- J. S. Bach and sons: Trio Sonatas (with Jean-Pierre Rampal, flute; Isaac Stern, violin; John Steele Ritter, fortepiano and harpsichord), CBS Masterworks IM 37813 (1983)
- Beethoven: Archduke Trio (with Claude Frank, piano; Emanuel Borok, violin), SQN Cassettes & Records 79005-1 (1983)
- Kabalevsky, Hindemith, Shostakovich: Works for Cello and Piano (with Malcolm Frager, piano), Arcadia ARC 25-002 (1991)
- Ravel, Kodály, Martinů: Works for Violin and Cello (with Josef Suk, violin), Arcadia ARC 2007-2 (1997)
- Porpora, Reger, Yun, Dohnányi: Works for Cello and Piano (with Wonmi Kim, piano), Arcadia ARC 1998-2 (1998)
- Dvorak: Cello Concerto; Tchaikovsky: Variations on a Rococo Theme (with KBS Symphony Orchestra, Othmar Mága cond.), Arcadia ARC 2008-2 (2008)
