= Busch Quartet =

German string quartet

- Origin: Berlin, Germany
- Occupation: String Quartet
- Years active: 1919-1951

The Busch Quartet is a string quartet founded by Adolf Busch in 1919 that is particularly noted for its interpretations of the Classical and Romantic quartet repertoire. The group's recordings of Beethoven's late quartets are especially revered.

== History ==
1930s monaural recordings, performed by The Adolf Busch Chamber Players conducted by Adolf Busch
Overture of Orchestral Suite No. 1, BWV 1066

String Quartet No. 9 in C major, No. 3 (Beethoven) Part 3: 2nd Movement (Part 1): Andante con moto quasi allegretto (A minor)

=== Foundations ===
In 1912, the position of concertmaster of the Wiener Konzertvereinorchester fell vacant. Many people, including principal violist Karl Doktor and principal cellist Paul Grümmer, recommended the 21-year-old German violinist and composer Adolf Busch for the role. After Busch's appointment, conductor Ferdinand Löwe and the directors of the new Konzerthaus wanted to start a string quartet based on the orchestra's principals, and as Busch was planning his own ensemble, it seemed an ideal arrangement. He accepted Doktor and Grümmer as quartet partners and brought in Fritz Rothschild as second violinist.

After intensive rehearsals, the Wiener Konzertvereinquartett was first heard on 25 May 1913, playing Haydn in a private concert in Eisenstadt. Its official debut came on 3 August at Lilli Lehmann's Salzburg Festival with Beethoven's F major Quartet, Op. 59 No. 1, and Schumann's A minor Quartet, Op. 41 No. 1. The new ensemble received immediate acclaim, with critics comparing it with the Joachim Quartet. The concerts that followed were equally successful. Rothschild was dismissed shortly before the outbreak of war in the summer of 1914, while in early 1915 Doktor was called up. A year later the replacement second violinist, Emil Hauser, was also commandeered by the army. Busch and Grümmer, both unfit for military service, kept the quartet going until the end of the 1916-17 season with a revolving cast of players.

=== Early years ===
On 27 May 1919 the Busch Quartet was founded in Berlin, where Busch was a professor at the Hochschule. Grümmer remained the cellist, but as Doktor had not yet been demobilized, the budding conductor and composer Emil Bohnke stood in for him on viola. The temporary second violinist was Karl Reitz, a friend and colleague from Busch's student quartets in Cologne, who was really a viola specialist. The ensemble began rehearsals on 1 July and made a quiet début on 21 October in the Rittersaal at Düsseldorf, with further appearances that year in Cologne, Bonn, Breslau, and Frankfurt. By the next season, when they gave their first of many Beethoven cycles—beginning with one in Beethoven's birthplace, Bonn—Reitz and Bohnke had dropped out and the inner parts were being played by Busch's Swedish pupil Gösta Andreasson and the stopgap violist Ernst Groell. At the end of November 1920, visiting Vienna for a series of concerts, Busch and Andreasson rehearsed with the Vienna-based Doktor and Grümmer, and on 6 December the Busch Quartet, with Doktor at last back in the fold, began a Netherlands tour at the Amsterdam Concertgebouw's Kleine Zaal. This first program by the group's 1920s formation, featuring music by Mozart, Reger and Beethoven, received a tumultuous ovation. Early the next year the four made a tour of Italy.

=== International prominence ===
Although Germany in the interwar years had many excellent quartets—including the Klingler, Wendling, Dresden, Gewandhaus, Gürzenich, Havemann, Deman, and Amar—Busch and his colleagues quickly established themselves as the best. All four members of Busch's ensemble were soloists in their own right, with a large repertoire of concertos and sonatas, and their fees reflected this status. But impresarios found that an entire subscription series could be sold by including the Busch Quartet. Engagements followed with dizzying rapidity, especially for the leader, who had the busiest solo career.

During the 1920s the Busch Quartet steadily built a reputation as the finest string quartet in Europe and, in effect, the world. Among European chamber-music aficionados, the quartet's performances acquired an almost mystical aura. For the likes of Isaiah Berlin, their performances had a philosophical force over and above purely musical considerations. They were particularly successful in Italy, where they toured at least once a year, playing Schubert for Eleonora Duse, Dvořák for Maxim Gorky, and Beethoven for Arturo Toscanini; they even gave a command performance for Pope Pius XI. Their other main centers of activity were Germany, Austria, Switzerland and the Netherlands, although they roamed fairly freely across Europe. One of their greatest fans in Berlin was Albert Einstein, who attended every Busch Quartet concert he could.

Yet there were tensions with Grümmer, and in 1930 he was replaced by Busch's younger brother Herman (né Hermann). This change ushered in the quartet's most successful period. On 24 October 1930 it made its British debut in Oxford, and in September 1932 it began its series of HMV recordings at Abbey Road Studios in London, recordings that have never left the catalogue. Soon the Busch Quartet became virtually a London institution, its recitals frequented by the likes of Samuel Beckett, Leonard and Virginia Woolf, Victor Gollancz, and Michael Tippett.

=== The war years ===
It should have been a notable era for the Busch Quartet in Germany, too, but the rise of Nazism had already caused Adolf and Frieda Busch to move to Basel in 1927. By the time Adolf Hitler came to power in 1933, the four men found themselves in an agonizing situation. On 1 April, the day of the Nazi boycott of Jewish businesses, they played Haydn's Seven Last Words in a Berlin church, and afterward decided unanimously that they had given their last concert in Nazi Germany. Despite the losses this decision entailed, not least in revenue, they never regretted it. Two weeks later they were off on a brief American tour, making their U.S. debut in the Coolidge Chamber Music Festival at the Library of Congress. Upon their return Andreasson and Herman Busch also moved to Basel. Thereafter the quartet confined its activities mainly to Britain, Austria, Italy, and Switzerland.

In Vienna the quartet had been the de facto resident ensemble at the Konzerthaus since 1919, giving regular recitals in the medium-sized room now known as the Mozartsaal, but following the rise of Nazism in that city, it quietly withdrew after 1935. In 1938, with the Anschluss in Austria and the adoption of antisemitic laws in Italy, the quartet boycotted those countries. Its members led the string sections in the orchestra at the 1938 and 1939 Lucerne Festivals, and in the latter year the quartet traveled to the U.S., giving four recitals—each including a late Beethoven quartet—in Carnegie Hall's chamber music room. This visit's success was a factor in Busch's decision to emigrate to the U.S. when war came, the four having been disappointed in their attempts to come to Britain. After several setbacks they reunited in New York in June 1940, but Busch's heart attack later that year forced his colleagues to take orchestral and teaching jobs. They resumed concerts and recordings in 1941 and had further successes in both spheres, before Andreasson's teaching commitments and the illnesses of both Doktor and Frieda Busch caused the ensemble to lapse in 1944. For the 1943-44 season the ailing Doktor was replaced by the sole woman to play in the group, Viennese-born Lotte Hammerschlag.

=== Postwar and dissolution ===
In 1946, Adolf and Herman Busch started a new Busch Quartet with Ernest Drucker (father of future Emerson String Quartet violinist Eugene Drucker) as second violinist and Hugo Gottesmann as violist. Its first public engagement was a Beethoven cycle at the Metropolitan Museum of Art in New York. In 1947, despite Busch's ill health, it made a triumphant tour of Britain and renewed acquaintance with Switzerland and Italy before visiting Iceland. Drucker had to leave the quartet that summer for family reasons, but by the end of the year he had been replaced by Bruno Straumann and the quartet gave a concert with Busch's son-in-law Rudolf Serkin in New York. Thereafter it divided its activity between the U.S. and Europe, appearing at the Strasbourg and Edinburgh Festivals in 1949. A European tour in early 1950 had to be canceled because of Busch's illness, but that September the quartet visited South America. In January 1951 it made an emotional return to Germany, touring for a month and giving 20 concerts, including one in Basel.

Their last Beethoven cycles followed in April and May 1951 in Italy and England, and the quartet finished its career as it had started 38 years earlier, with a private reading of a Haydn quartet, this time at the home of English friends. But there was a coda: a single performance in Vermont at which Philipp Naegele stood in for Gottesmann. A long German tour was planned for 1952, but at the end of 1951, Busch's retirement due to illness ended the quartet's career.

== Style ==
The Busch Quartet's playing represented a transition between the earlier style of the Joachim, Ysaÿe, and Rosé Quartets, in which the leader was paramount, and the more modern approach exemplified by the Budapest and Smetana Quartets, in which every player had an equal role. Busch dominated his colleagues to an extent, through both his strength of personality and the sheer weight and quality of his tone.

This move toward a more egalitarian approach was reflected in the quartet's seating arrangement. The classic seating plan for a quartet, typified by the Joachim Quartet, was to have the two violinists facing each other and the cellist and violist to the rear. The Busch Quartet originally favored this scheme but by 1930 had changed to seating the second violinist on the leader's left, the cellist at the back and the violist facing the leader. This formation prevented the slower-speaking viola from being heard fractionally after the bass line, as could occur when the cello was in front.

A reflection of an earlier musical style was the Busch players' use of portamento, although they were perhaps somewhat less liberal in its application than the Rosé, Bohemian, or Léner ensembles. In rehearsal they concentrated on intonation, balance, precision of ensemble, rhythm and articulation, leaving phrasing and fingering at least partly to the inspiration of the concert hall. For instance, when it came to a recital or recording session, one member might make a spontaneous portamento but the player of the answering phrase might not; he may have felt omitting it sounded better or more individual, it may not have even occurred to him, or perhaps he just didn't feel comfortable echoing the portamento at that moment.

Even while honoring such 19th-century precedents, Busch and his colleagues were pioneers in their day, bringing a new forcefulness to the music of Beethoven, Mozart, Schubert, Schumann and Brahms, and bowing very much "into the string" with more vibrato than was typical at the time. They were adept at intensifying or withdrawing vibrato to mark the entry of a new voice in a contrapuntal texture, and could play without vibrato like the Capet Quartet when it seemed appropriate, for instance in a chorale passage. Another trademark was their vast range of dynamics, but although they had the tonal wherewithal to fill a large hall they preferred smaller rooms like those in which Haydn, Mozart or Beethoven were first heard. The interpretations preserved in their recordings contain not a trace of routine, tradition for the sheer sake of tradition or perfunctoriness, such as the fashionable habit of momentum-breaking ritardando at the end of fast movements not requested in the score.

== Repertoire ==
The Busch Quartet had a vast repertoire. Its members shared a conservative taste in music and included virtually all the Classical masterpieces in their repertoire, including at least 30 Haydn works, more Mozart than any of their contemporaries, and all the Beethoven quartets. With pianist Rudolf Serkin adding a "perfect fifth" to the group, it expanded its programs even further: for instance, the ensemble's only interwar appearance at the Salzburg Festival was an all-Mozart program consisting of a violin sonata, a piano quartet, and a string quartet. Other concerts included works for solo violin or piano, duos, trios or piano quintets; and if extra players were recruited, string quintets, sextets, or even the Beethoven Septet and Schubert Octet might be played.

Beyond the core Classical repertoire, the Quartet performed a fair amount from the Romantic era, especially Brahms and Dvořák, while modern music was represented by Reger, Tovey, Suter, Walker, Andreae, and Busch himself. They performed no Bartók, Hindemith, Kodály, or Smetana; no Russian music; virtually no Nordic music (although they briefly explored Stenhammar and Sibelius); and no French music apart from rare outings with the Debussy and Ravel quartets. They all liked Italian music: the Verdi E minor Quartet featured prominently in their programs, and they played Viotti and Boccherini and premiered Pizzetti's D major Quartet. They disliked atonal and twelve-tone music but made up for their lack of contemporaneity with their depth of knowledge of their repertoire and their mastery in playing it.
