= Rudolf Deman =

German violinist (1880–1960)

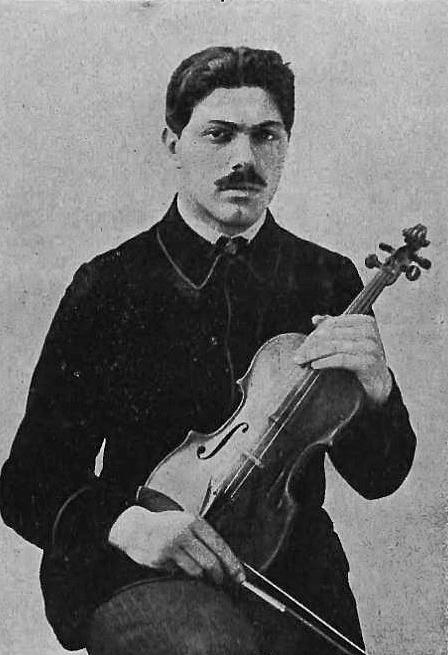
- Rudolf Deman (before 1907)
- Born: Rudolf Diamant; 20 April 1880; Vienna, Austrian Empire
- Died: 19 March 1960 (aged 79); Berlin, Germany
- Education: Vienna Conservatory
- Occupations: Classical violinist; Academic teacher
- Organizations: Orchestra of the Berlin State Opera; Hochschule für Musik Berlin; Deman String Quartet

Rudolf Deman (20 April 1880 – 19 March 1960) was an Austrian-German violinist and academic teacher. He was concertmaster of Orchestra of the Berlin State Opera from 1918 to 1930 and first violinist of the Deman String Quartet which made several recordings.

== Life ==
Rudolf Diamant was born in Vienna, the youngest of eight children of goldsmith Moritz Diamant (1838–1927) and Anna, née Bohenzky (1837–1924). The name was changed from "Diamant" to "Deman" in 1892.

He graduated from the Vienna Conservatory in 1898 with distinction, in the class of Jakob Grün. He possibly received additional training with Joseph Joachim in Berlin.

He served three years in the military and worked as concertmaster at the Lviv Theatre of Opera and Ballet from 1901 to 1908. From 1908 to 1918, he was concertmaster of the orchestra at the Badisches Staatstheater Karlsruhe, appointed court concertmaster in May 1909. In 1911, Deman married the actress Edith Ausfeld (1886–1960), who was also engaged there. Their son Hans Eduard Maximilian Deman (1912–1986) later worked in the German diplomatic service.

From 1914, Deman also played in the Bayreuth Festival orchestra. During his enlistment in World War I, he worked as a courier in the Vienna War Ministry in 1917/1918. After the First World War, Deman was for some time a member of the Poźniak Trio.

From the 1918/19 season to 1930, Deman was one of the concertmasters of the Orchestra of the Berlin State Opera. In the 1920s he was appointed professor at the Hochschule für Musik Berlin. He formed the Deman String Quartet with Emil Kornsand (second violin), Karl Reitz (viola) and Carl Dechert (cello). On 29 October 1923, he was one of the musicians who took part in the first German radio broadcast from the Berlin Vox-Haus.

In 1930, Deman married the soprano Frida Leider, whom he had met in July 1923 while working together at the Waldoper festival. He gave up his concertmaster duties to accompany her on her international tours. As a Jew, he was no longer allowed to engage in public activity from 1933, though as an Austrian citizen he was protected from further attacks until 1938. After the Anschluss and the 1938 Kristallnacht, Deman emigrated to Switzerland. To enable his economic survival, Frida Leider tried to support him through guest performances abroad and money sent in a roundabout way. In 1943, the marriage was officially dissolved, but the couple resumed their marital union in 1946, after Deman's return from exile. Deman continued to teach and was again professor at the Hochschule für Musik.

On 2 April 1955, he was awarded the Federal Cross of Merit 1st class.

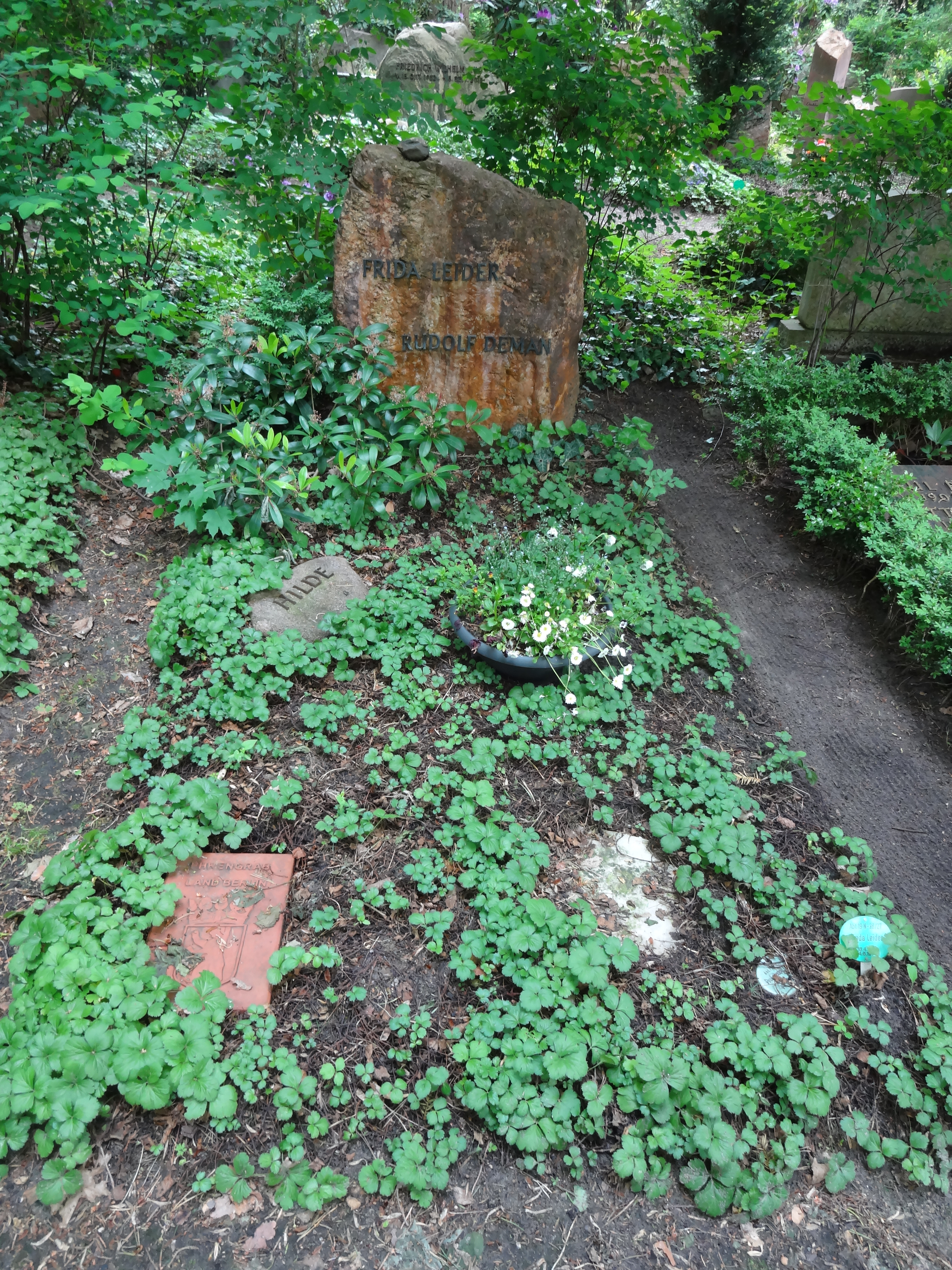
Rudolf Deman's grave at the Friedhof Heerstraße in Berlin-Westend

Deman died in Berlin on 19 March 1960, at age 79. He was buried at the state-owned Heerstraße cemetery near the Olympiapark Berlin in the Bezirk Charlottenburg in what is now the district of Berlin-Westend (grave location: 19-N-26/27). His wife was also buried there, in 1975.

== Recordings ==
Deman made his first trio recordings for Odeon Records around 1921, and in 1923 he accompanied singers on Homocord.

In 1923 and 1924, he made numerous recordings for Vox, rather light music in duo and trio, but also the Lento from the Violin Concerto by Richard Strauss. Finally, from 1926 to 1930, he recorded with the Deman String Quartet for Deutsche Grammophon: string quartets by Beethoven (op. 18.4, op. 59.3 and op. 132), Dittersdorf (E flat major quartet), Glasunov (Interlude), Mozart (Quartet K 464) and Schubert (Quartets D 87, D 804, D 810 and 5 German Dances) in complete recordings.
