= Emil Bohnke =

German violist, composer and conductor

Emil Bohnke (11 October 1888 – 11 May 1928) was a German violist, composer and conductor active in Berlin.

== Life ==
Born in Zduńska Wola near Łódź, Poland, Emil Bohnke was the son of textile manufacturer Ferdinand Bohnke. From 1901 to 1908, he studied violin with Hans Sitt and composition with Stephan Krehl at the Leipzig Conservatory, continuing his studies in Berlin at the Prussian Academy of Arts from 1908 with Friedrich Gernsheim.

Bohnke taught for two years at the Stern Conservatory in Berlin. In 1919, he married violinist Lilli von Mendelssohn (born 1897) of the Mendelssohn family and fathered three children, the youngest of which was pianist Robert-Alexander Bohnke (1927–2004). He was the violist of the Bandler Quartet and the Busch Quartet (1919–1921) led by Adolf Busch. Bohnke played a 1699 viola by luthier Giovanni Grancino given to him by his father-in-law. As conductor, he headed the Leipzig Symphony Orchestra (1923–1926) and succeeded Oscar Fried as principal conductor of the Berlin Symphony Orchestra in 1926.

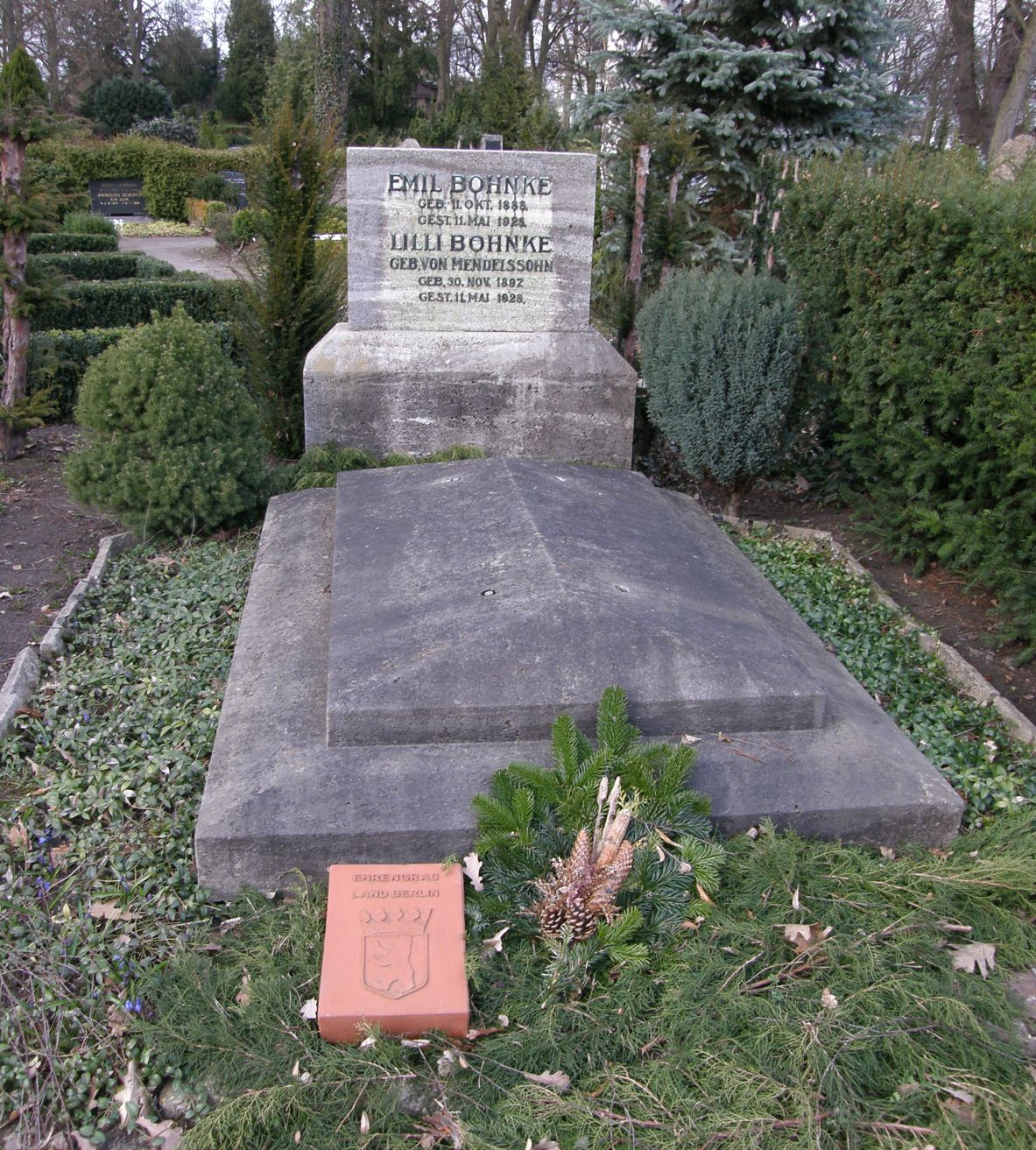
Grave of Emil and Lilli Bohnke, Friedhof Dahlem

In May 1928, Bohnke and his wife were in Pasewalk in search of a summer home when they had an automobile accident and, tragically, both were killed. The children had been left with their maternal grandparents, Marie (1867–1957) and Franz von Mendelssohn (1865–1935), who thereafter raised them in their mansion in Berlin. Bohnke and his wife are buried at Friedhof Dahlem in Berlin.

== Music ==
Bohnke composed a body of sixteen opuses, comprising mainly chamber music and piano pieces, but also orchestral works and concertos. His initial compositions are in the late-romantic vein, and gradually incorporate more expressionistic elements. The later works are characterized by dense thematic material and bold harmonies that often go beyond his still-existing framework of tonality.

Bohnke's most important work, a Symphony composed in 1927, was premiered shortly after his death on 11 November 1928 by the Staatskapelle Berlin conducted by Erich Kleiber.

Soon after Bohnke's death, his music was largely forgotten. In 1933, during the Third Reich, the authorities prohibited his music largely due to his wife being of Jewish origin. Some efforts have been made to revive Bohnke's music through performances and recordings.

== Works ==
Orchestral

- Symphonische Ouvertüre (Symphonic Overture), Op. 2
- Thema mit Variationen (Theme and Variations), Op. 9
- Symphony, Op. 16 (1927)

Concertante

- Concerto in D major for violin and orchestra, Op. 11 (1920)
- Concerto in D minor for piano and orchestra, Op. 14 (1925)

Chamber music

- String Quartet in C minor, Op. 1 (1913)
- Sonata for violin and piano, Op. 3
- Piano Trio in B♭ minor, Op. 5
- Sonata in F minor for cello and piano, Op. 7 (1918)
- 3 Sonatas, Op. 13 (1921)

1. Sonata for violin solo
2. Sonata for viola solo
3. Sonata for cello solo

- Sonata for violin solo, Op. 15 No. 1
- Ciacona, for violin solo, Op. 15 No. 2
- Blätter für die Jugend, for violin and piano or string quartet
- Satz (Movement), for string quartet

Piano

- Drei Stücke, Op. 4
- Sechs Stücke, Op. 6
- Acht Stücke, Op. 8
- Sonata in B♭ minor, Op. 10
- Sechs Skizzen, Op. 12
- Blätter für die Jugend
- Nocturn

== Discography ==
- Emil Bohnke: Piano Concerto, Op. 14; Symphony, Op. 16 – Robert-Alexander Bohnke (piano); Israel Yinon (conductor); Bamberg Symphony; Koch Schwann 3-6420-2 (2001)
- Emil Bohnke: Violin Concerto, Op. 11; Thema mit Variationen, Op. 9; Sinfonische Ouvertüre, Op. 2 – Kolja Lessing (violin), Israel Yinon (conductor); Prague Radio Symphony Orchestra (SOČR); Real Sound RS 051-0035 (2004)
- Emil Bohnke: Chamber Music - Kolja Lessing (violin and viola); Bernhard Schwarz (violoncello); Trio Alkan; Verdi-Quartett. Dabringhaus & Grimm MDG 325 05531-2 (1995)
- Emil Bohnke: Piano Works – Robert-Alexander Bohnke (piano); Real Sound 0032 (2001)

Sonata in B♭ minor, Op. 10
Nocturn
Sechs Stücke, Op. 6
Acht Stücke, Op. 8
Sechs Skizzen, Op. 12

== Sources ==
- Friedhof Dahlem-Dorf: Bohnke, Emil Retrieved 25 January 2011.
- Robinson, Bradford (2005), Emil Bohnke Retrieved 25 January 2011.
- Fricke, Richard. History of the "Red Mendelssohn" Stradivarius Retrieved 25 January 2011.
