= Edmund von Borck =

German composer and director

- Born: 22 February 1906
- Origin: Germany
- Died: 16 February 1944 (aged 37)
- Occupation: Composer

Edmund Konstantin Wilhelm von Borck (22 February 1906 – 16 February 1944) was a German composer of (modern) classical music and a conductor.

== Life ==
Edmund von Borck was born in Breslau, Germany to a landholding family that had joined the nobility in 1796. His father, Eduard von Borck (1864–1938) was a captain (Rittmeister) with the Silesian cuirassier regiment (de:Leib-Kürassier-Regiment „Großer Kurfürst“ (Schlesisches) Nr. 1). His mother, Erika (née Lübbecke) (1880–1945), was related to Johann Friedrich Reichardt.

Borck studied piano with Bronisław von Poźniak from 1920 to 1926 and had composition lessons from Ernst Kirsch. After graduating from school with his Abitur, he began studying musicology. He continued this study in Berlin in 1928, but soon afterwards switched his focus to conducting, and completed the conducting (Kapellmeister) class at the Berliner Musikhochschule under the direction of Julius Prüwer.

In 1930 he became conductor of the Frankfurt Opera and was a guest conductor of the Berlin Philharmonic, the Amsterdam Concertgebouw, and the Orchestra dell'Accademia Nazionale di Santa Cecilia in Rome. In 1931 he returned to Berlin and largely retired from conducting, instead devoting himself to composing. His first compositions were published in 1932. In 1933 he made his breakthrough with the world premiere of his Five Orchestra Pieces, op. 8 at the World Music Day of the International Society for Contemporary Music in Amsterdam.

He was regarded as one of the most promising composers of his generation in Europe. His works were published by Universal Edition in Vienna starting in 1936.

Borck was called up for military service in 1940 and died in Nettuno, Italy during Operation Shingle, the allied invasion of Italy. His grave is in the German military cemetery in Pomezia (Deutscher Soldatenfriedhof Pomezia).

== Works ==
=== Choral works ===
- op. 9 Ländliche Kantate (rural cantata) for female, male, and boys' voices and string orchestra, on texts by Richard Billinger

=== Chamber music ===
- op. 7 Sonata for violin and piano
- op. 11/1 Introduction and Capriccio for violin and piano (1934)
- op. 11/2 Präludium (prelude) for violin
- op. 12 Allegro ditirambico for piano (1934)
- op. 13 Altlieder (old songs) (1937)
- op. 15a Sextet for flute and string quintet (1936)
- op. 19 Kleine Suite (Little suite) for flute
- op. 23 Three songs for alto voice, viola, and piano, on poems of Rainer Maria Rilke

=== Operas ===
- op. 18 Napoleon, opera in three acts, freely adapted from Ch. D. Grabbe's drama (1940–42), (premiered 19 September 1942 at the Theater Gera in Gera, Thuringia, Germany)

=== Orchestral works ===
- op. 6 Concerto for alto saxophone and orchestra (1932), (premiered 1932 at Musikfest Hannover by saxophonist Sigurd Raschèr and conductor Rudolf Krasselt)
- op. 8 Five orchestral pieces (1933)
- op. 10 Prelude and fugue for orchestra (1934)
- op. 14 Concerto for orchestra (1935) (Premiered 4 February 1936 in the Kurzwellensender Berlin)
- op. 15b Concertino for flute and string orchestra (1936)
- op. 16 Theme, four variations, and finale (1936) (premiered 21 April 1936 at the Dresden Musikfest by the Dresdner Philharmonie, Paul van Kempen, conductor)
- op. 17 Two fantasy pieces (Fantasiestücke) (1940) (premiered 1940 at the Hamburg State Opera (Hamburger Staatsoper), Eugen Jochum, conductor)
- op. 20 Concerto for piano and orchestra (1941) (premiered May 1941 in Berlin with pianist Conrad Hansen)
- op. 21 Orphika (1942), (premiered 21 November 1948 by the Leipzig Radio Symphony Orchestra (Rundfunk-Sinfonieorchester Leipzig)

== Sources ==
- Werner Bollert (1955). "Borck, Edmund Konstantin Wilhelm von". Neue Deutsche Biographie (in German). Vol. 2. Berlin: Duncker & Humblot. pp. 458–459. (full text online).
- Hans Gresser: Edmund von Borck: Ein Fragment. Laumann-Verlag, Dülmen 1989, ISBN 3-87466-127-X
- Gesine Schröder: Schlesische Moderne um 1930. Zwei Beispiele: Edmund von Borck und Hans Zielowsky (in German), SLUB Dresden 2010
- Hans-Jürgen Winterhoff: Fünf schlesische Komponisten des 20. Jahrhunderts. Gudrun Schröder Verlag, Bonn 1994, ISBN 3-926196-20-3
- Literature by and about Edmund von Borck in the German National Library catalogue
- Original article in German Wikipedia
