= Bronisław von Poźniak =

Autro-German pianist

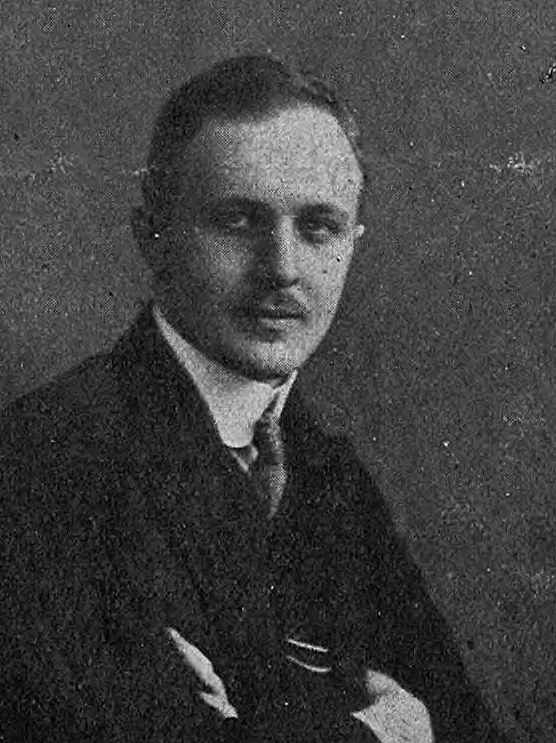
Bronisław Poźniak (before 1913)

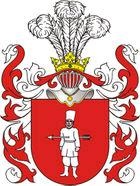
Coat of arms of the Polish noble family Poźniak

Bronislaw Ritter von Pozniak (Polish Bronisław Poźniak, [pɔʑɲ̩ak]), (26 August 1887 – 20 April 1953) was an Austro-German pianist of Polish descent, piano teacher, music writer and editor.

== Life and activity ==
Pozniak was born in Lviv in the Austrian part of the then divided Poland, the seventh child of an engineer and Austrian civil servant from Polish nobility. Her mother came from a humble background. Her father was a customs official. The young Bronislaw's early interest in music met with little approval from his parents at first, as a civil service career had been planned for him. However, as his talent for music, especially for playing the piano, became more and more apparent, his parents gradually gave up their resistance. After the family moved to Krakow, he received lessons from renowned teachers at the conservatoire such as Felicjan Szopski (1865–1939), Jerzy Lalewicz (1875–1951) and Władysław Żeleński (1837–1921). After graduating from high school, he attended a newly founded commercial college in Krakow, where it was possible to take the state examination after studying for only two semesters. Only on this condition did his father agree to the artist's career.

After initial artistic successes in Lviv and later in Krakow, Pozniak continued his studies in Berlin at the financial sacrifice of his father. Arthur Rubinstein had recommended Pozniak to his own teacher Karl Heinrich Barth, a relentless piano professor at the Berlin University of the Arts who was feared by many, who had such distinguished students as Wilhelm Kempff and Heinrich Neuhaus. There in Berlin, the foundations were laid for the most important components of Pozniak's later work. In addition to solo concertizing, these were above all his great interest in pedagogical activity (he began teaching at the Ochs-Eichelberger Conservatory in Berlin while still a student) and his passion for chamber music, which then led to the formation of a piano trio. Material hardship accompanied the artistic activities of the now independent musician in Berlin.

In 1915, Pozniak took over a piano class at the conservatory in Breslau, which was in a rather desolate state. The Silesian capital remained Pozniak's main place of activity for the next 30 years until his flight on 3 February 1945. From 1918 to 1936, Pozniak worked at the Silesian Conservatory and he also took over the master class for pianists when this institution was transformed into the "Landesmusikschule" in 1936. From 1919 to 1925, Pozniak also taught at the Cieplik Conservatory in Beuthene, Upper Silesia, and from 1929 to 1931, he was in charge of the master class at the "Polish Music Association Conservatory" in Lviv, which he supplied once a month from Wroclaw. The appointment to this post was a special honour, as it was the class once supervised by Chopin's pupil Karol Mikuli. Together with the full professor of musicology at the Schlesische Friedrich-Wilhelms-Universität zu Breslau Arnold Schmitz (1893–1980), Pozniak advocated the creation of the "University Institute for Music Education and Church Music", an extension of the Institute for Church Music, headed by Schmitz and affiliated to the university, and also became head of the piano department there.

Pozniak's extensive pedagogical work, especially in Breslau, but also in other parts of Silesia and the great success of his pupils at regularly organised recitals and concerts made him a sought-after piano teacher to whom pupils flocked from all parts of the country and especially from the eastern countries. Of the many students, the most successful was the pianist Josef Wagner (1900–1947), Prize winner of the International Chopin Piano Competition 1932 in Warsaw. Also Hans Otte, Hans Pischner, Gerhard Wohlgemuth, Edmund von Borck, Hans-Georg Burghardt and many other notable musicians were students of Pozniak.

In addition to this pedagogical work, there was intensive solo activity, performances in piano duos and, above all, concert tours with his trio to the most important cities in Europe. The Pozniak Trio, founded in 1923, played in changing line-ups was one of the leading chamber music associations in Europe. Pozniak's trio partners in the string section included violinists Hugo Birkigt (1885–1944), Hugo Kortschak (1884–1957), Rudolf Deman (1880–1960), Géza de Kresz (1882–1959), Karl Freund (1904–1955), Hans Dünschede (1907–1999), Eugen Forster, Hans Bassermann (1888–1967), Johannes Bastiaan (1911–2012) as well as the cellists Hugo Dechert (1860–1923), Hans Kindler (1892–1949), Heinz Beyer, Joseph Schuster (1903–1969), Jascha Bernstein, Bernhard Günther, Sigrid Succo and Gregor Piatigorsky (1903–1976). In addition to the (pre)classical-romantic repertoire, the Pozniak Trio also devoted itself intensively to contemporary composers, such as Hans Pfitzner, Hans Gál, Paul Juon, Paul Kletzki, Egon Kornauth, Ludomir Różycki and Hans-Georg Burghardt.

When the Second World War broke out, Pozniak was harassed by the National Socialists as a 'Pole' and 'foreigner', although he had in the meantime obtained German citizenship. Because he played music with Jewish artists, he was blacklisted by the National Socialist rulers, suspended from service at the university institute for a year, but then reinstated. His solo activities and performances with the Pozniak Trio were also boycotted in Silesia for the same reason, and he had to answer to two Gestapo trials after being denounced.

Fleeing the Russian army from Breslau on 3 February 1945, Pozniak and his family first went to Markranstädt, then in August 1945 to Leipzig, where he stayed for three and a half years, and later to Halle. In his memoirs Pozniak, now homeless, unemployed and almost penniless, describes the difficulties the unwelcome and ill-treated refugees had to contend with and how he, the once celebrated and popular pianist and teacher, had to stand his ground against the united front of hostile colleagues. Efforts to revive the Pozniak Trio initially failed due to administrative harassment. Targeted negative concert reviews by the press added to the problem.

A small group of musicians, such as Günther Ramin, Walter Niemann, Wilhelm Weismann, and his students stuck by him, whose family had to live on the small earnings of the younger son. But despite all resistance, he succeeded in regaining a foothold in the pedagogical as well as the artistic field. Wilhelm Weismann, then editor at Edition Peters, succeeded in entrusting Pozniak with the New Edition of the Piano Works of Frédéric Chopin, organised on the occasion of the 100th anniversary of the death of Frédéric Chopin in 1949, and also supported him in the completion of the book Chopin. Praktische Anweisungen für das Studium der Chopin-Werke, which was then published by Mitteldeutscher Verlag in Halle in 1949.

In the meantime, Pozniak had been appointed professor in Halle by Hans Stieber, the first rector of the Staatliche Hochschule für Theater und Musik Halle, which was newly founded in 1947, as well as Sigfrid Grundeis, known as a Liszt player, with whom he was on friendly terms. At the same time, Pozniak taught at the Institute for Music Education at the Faculty of Education of the Martin Luther University of Halle-Wittenberg. The number of students in Leipzig and Halle grew, making it difficult to cope with the work. Pozniak decided, partly because of the political situation which did not allow performances abroad, to give up concertizing and devote himself to publishing work in addition to his pedagogical activities. In addition to the improved new edition of the "ABC des Klavierspielers", which was published by Robert Forberg in 1948, Pozniak prepared a new edition of the Piano Sonatas of Ludwig van Beethoven for the Mitteldeutsche Verlag in Halle, of which only the first volume could be completed and which was then taken over by Edition Peters in Leipzig. Also for Edition Peters, he published an album Piano Music of Russian and Soviet Masters in 1953 (Edition Peters No. 4574).

The enormous workload, the sometimes adverse living conditions, the unresolved fate of his eldest son Jan, who had been missing during the war, exhausted the strength of the musician, who was also admired by young people in his new homeland. Pozniak died of heart disease in Halle on 20 April 1953 at the age of 65. He is buried in the cemetery in Nottensdorf, the home of his youngest son Andreas (d. 2013). A commemorative plaque in the entrance hall of Villa Lehman in Halle, the former seat of the State University for Theatre and Music, commemorates the great pianist and pedagogue, who explicitly understood his work as a contribution to the reparation of past atrocities and to understanding between the Polish and German people.

== Appreciation ==
=== Piano pedagogy and Chopin playing ===
When Pozniak edited his writings, the sometimes bitter disputes, especially in the first quarter of the 20th century, between the advocates of the older piano methodology (emphasis on finger technique) and the various reformers (emphasis on weight technique in piano) were still going on. The focus was on the weight technique of Rudolf Maria Breithaupt and its uncompromising rejection by Elisabeth Caland in favour of the use of the back muscles and the lowering of the shoulder blades. Pozniak dispenses with theoretical discussions and approaches the problems of piano playing from the practical side. He takes a more mediating position, balancing the extremes. The starting point for him is also the training of the fingers, but without the exaggerated pulling up of the fingers, which often leads to playing damage and is usually accompanied by cramping of the muscles. He emphasises the importance of relaxation (he uses the term free stretching to characterise the feeling of comfort and freedom) and avoiding unnecessary movements. Great care is also advised in tensioning and stretching exercises. With his new ideas, Pozniak thus became a pioneer of today's views on the problem of playing damage and its prevention. The types of touch necessary for playing the piano are systematised and discussed using examples. In addition to active finger playing, weight playing is used especially in the shaping of cantilenas. Pozniak rejects the outdated, inaccurate pedal signs, some of which are still in use today. He favours (see his edition of the Beethoven Sonatas) the exact pedal signs of Theodor Wiehmeyer, which, however, have not become established and are not used in his own edition of Chopin's piano works.

In his Chopin book, reference is made again and again to the elementary descriptions of the "ABC of the Piano Player". Just as simplicity and naturalness are methodological principles in the technical field, the same basic principles apply to the interpretation of Chopin's piano works. Pozniak sees himself as a preserver of the tradition of Polish Chopin playing as taught by Karol Mikuli, Chopin's pupil, in Lemberg. He opposes the excessive emphasis on the technical side of Chopin's piano works, as expressed above all in the exaggerated tempi of some Chopin players. This display of technical skills, as is observed especially in the interpretation of the Études, is a distortion of the spirit of Chopin's music, which, according to Pozniak, is characterised by nobility, poetry, naturalness, absence of any sentimentality and deeply felt love and attachment to the Polish homeland and the Polish people.

One of the special features of Pozniak's new edition of Chopin's piano works in the Edition Peters is the fingering, which in its deliberate simplicity leads to some facilitation of playing. It reflects Pozniak's pedagogical experience and he also wants to make piano playing easier in this sector, in contrast to other editors who lead the player into blind alleys through some quibbles. Thus, the finger changes for repeated notes and ornaments are consistently dispensed with, as is practised by most pianists today and as was already presented by, for example, Gottfried Galston in his study book and Ferruccio Busoni in the preface to his later edition of J. S. Bach's 2-part inventions. Pozniak's sparing pedalling, which not infrequently contradicts Chopin's own indications, has as its guideline clarity in harmony and line, which should not be blurred. Here one can reproach Pozniak for not having taken into account that Chopin, for all the differences in the effect of the damping of the pianos of the time, very well sometimes intended sound mixtures and therefore resorted to pedal indications that seem bold to us today. This is also pointed out by Paul Badura-Skoda in the notes on interpretation in his Chopin edition (Edition Peters). There are no solo recordings of the pianist Pozniak, whom Walter Niemann calls "one of our most wonderful Chopin players". The surviving sound documents with his piano trio show, despite the age-related acoustic-technical deficiencies, a sensitive musician, responsive to his fellow players, whose slender and transparent tone, also according to his partners and critics, made him an ideal chamber music pianist.

== Recordings ==
Recordings for the Carl Lindström AG. Berlin, late 1920 / early 1921

Trio Pozniak-Deman-Beyer: Bronislaw von Pozniak (piano), Rudolf Deman (violin), Hans Beyer (violoncello)

- Peter I. Tschaikowsky: Thema und Variationen aus: Klaviertrio a-Moll, op. 50. ODEON AA 57861
- Peter I. Tschaikowsky: Walzer aus: Klaviertrio a-Moll, op. 50. ODEON AA 57862
- Franz Schubert: 3. Satz / Allegro moderato aus: Klaviertrio Es-Dur, op. 100, D 929. ODEON AA 57863
- Anton Arensky: 3. Satz / Elegie aus: Klaviertrio Nr. 1 d-Moll, op. 32. ODEON AA 57864

Recordings for the Deutsche Grammophon AG. Berlin, 1925

Auslandslabel: POLYDOR

Pozniak-Trio: Bronislaw von Pozniak (piano); Carl Freund (violin); Joseph Schuster (cello)

- Antonín Dvorák: Klaviertrio Nr. 4 e-Moll, op. 90 "Dumky-Trio" (5 Seiten). GRAMMOPHON 66194/66196
- Bedrich Smetana: 2. Satz / Allegro ma non agitato aus: Klaviertrio g-Moll, op. 15. GRAMMOPHON 66196
- Jean-Philippe Rameau: Cinquième Concert aus den Pièces de clavecin en concert. GRAMMOPHON 66197

Recordings for the Deutsche Grammophon AG. Berlin, 1926

Pozniak-Trio: Bronislaw von Pozniak (piano); Carl Freund (violin); Joseph Schuster (cello)

- Paul Kletzki: 3. Satz / Adagio from the Trio d-Moll, op. 16. GRAMMOPHON 66415
  - The Pozniak Trio premiered this work on 13 April 1926 in Berlin
- Egon Kornauth: Fragment from the Klaviertrio op. 27. GRAMMOPHON 66415
- Paul Juon: Rêverie, Humoresque, Elegie from the Trio-Miniaturen, op. 18 (3 Seiten). GRAMMOPHON 62548/62549
- Paul Juon: Danse phantastique from the Trio-Miniaturen, op. 24. GRAMMOPHON 62549

with Emmi Leisner, alto

- Ludwig van Beethoven: Trüb', trüb' ist mein Auge; Die holde Maid von Inverness; Oh, grausam war mein Vater; Der treue Johnie; Der Abend aus "Twenty-five Scottish songs", op. 108. POLYDOR 73021/71023
  - Überspielung auf CD: "The Art of Emmi Leisner". Lebendige Vergangenheit / Preiser Records 89210 (P) 1994

Recordings for the Electrola AG. Berlin, 23 October 1930

Pozniak-Trio: Bronislaw von Pozniak (piano); Carl Freund (violin); Jascha Bernstein (violoncello)

- Antonín Dvorák: Klaviertrio Nr. 4 e-Moll, op. 90 "Dumky-Trio" (6 Seiten). ELECTROLA EH 647/649; His Master's Voice C.2384/2386; HMV AN.715/717

RUNDFUNK. live, 3 March 1939

Pozniak-Trio: Bronislaw von Pozniak (piano); Eugen Forster (violin); Sigrid Succo (violoncello)

- Antonín Dvorák: Klaviertrio Nr. 4 e-Moll, op. 90 "Dumky-Trio"

Recording stored in the Narodowe Archivum cyfrowe, Warsaw under the shelf mark 3/33/0/1/2957

Recordings for the Deutsche Grammophon GmbH. Berlin, 14 February 1941

with Lore Fischer, Alto. Triobegleitung: Prof. Br. v. Pozniak, Hans Bastian, Siegrid Succo. musical editing: Gerhard Strecke

- Johann Abraham Peter Schulz: Der Mond ist aufgegangen. Unveröffentlicht
- Volksweise: Die Blümelein, sie schlafen. GRAMMOPHON 47539
- Friedrich Silcher: Drauß' ist alles so prächtig. GRAMMOPHON 47539
- Joseph Haydn: Es weiden meine Schafe aus „Schottische Volkslieder“ (Hob. XXXIb). GRAMMOPHON 47541
- Joseph Haydn: Rose weiß, Rose rot aus „Schottische Volkslieder“ (Hob. XXXIb). GRAMMOPHON 47541

Recording for the Ludwig Hupfeld AG. Leipzig

- The solo recordings on piano roll with works by Frédéric Chopin, which Pozniak says he made in his memoirs for the Ludwig Hupfeld AG, could not be determined until now (September 2020).

== Work, editions ==
- Bronislaw v. Pozniak: Das ABC des Klavierspielers. L. Oemigkes's Verlagsbuchhandlung, Berlin u. Breslau 1936.
- Bronislaw v. Pozniak: ABC des Klavierspielers. 2. extended edition. Robert Forberg Musikverlag, Leipzig 1948.
- Bronisław Poźniak: ABC pianisty. Przekład: Bogdan Zieliński, Izabella Zielińska. Ars Nova, Poznań 1992. (Polish translation of the 1st German edition from 1936).
- Bronislaw v. Pozniak: Chopin. Praktische Anweisungen für das Studium der Chopin-Werke. Published in cooperation with the German Chopin Committee Berlin. Mitteldeutscher Verlag, Halle (Saale) 1949.
- Bronislaw v. Pozniak: Lebenserinnerungen. Transcribed from the manuscript and edited by Cristina v. Pozniak-Bierschenk. Unveröffentlichter Privatdruck. Osnabrück 1985. Nachdruck 2006.
- Bronislaw v. Pozniak (ed.): Frédéric Chopin, Klavierwerke. New edition. Edition Peters, Leipzig 1949 ff.
- Bronislaw v. Pozniak (ed.): Ludwig van Beethoven, Sonaten für Klavier Bd. 1 (Sonaten 1–14). Instruktive Neuausgabe nach dem Urtext. Mitteldeutscher Verlag, Halle (Saale). In die Edition Peters Collection Litolff Nr. 5605 übernommen. Leipzig 1953. (Einzelheiten s. Weblinks)
- Bronislaw v. Pozniak (ed.): Klaviermusik russischer und sowjetischer Meister. Edition Peters, Leipzig 1951.
