= Elsa Hilger =

American cellist

Else Hilger
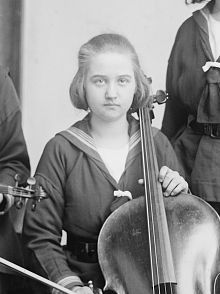
- Born: 13 April 1904; Trutnov, Austria-Hungary (now Czech Republic)
- Died: May 17, 2005 (aged 101); Shelburne, Vermont, U.S.

Elsa Hilger (April 13, 1904 – May 17, 2005) was an American cellist. She was the first woman other than a harpist to become a member of a major symphony orchestra.

She was born in Trutnov in the Austro-Hungarian Empire. She began taking cello lessons with Otakar Ševčík at the age of nine. Her father died in World War I and her mother took her three daughters to Vienna, where Hilger and her two sisters were awarded scholarships to the Vienna Conservatory. There she studied with Paul Grümmer. At the age of twelve, she performed Tchaikovsky's Variations on a Rococo Theme with the Vienna Philharmonic. The following year, she was presented with a Guarneri cello. At the end of World War I, she began touring with her two sisters as The Hilger Trio. The sisters also performed several times with Albert Einstein as a quartet. In 1935, Hilger was invited to join the Philadelphia Orchestra by Leopold Stokowski. She began performing in the fourth chair; later, conductor Eugene Ormandy invited her to become assistant principal cellist. Despite her talent, she never became first cellist during her 35 years with the orchestra.

She also taught at the Philadelphia Conservatory of Music.

In 1935, she married Willem Ezerman, the son of D. Hendrik Ezerman, director of the Philadelphia conservatory. She taught her son and grandson to play the cello.

In 1969, Hilger was forced to retire from the orchestra due to union rules and moved to Lake Dunmore, Vermont. She continued to perform, giving her last recital at the age of 95. Hilger continued to teach at her home in Shelburne, Vermont.

She died at home in Vermont in 2005.
