= Hermann Busch =

German musician

Hermann Busch (24 June 1897 – 3 June 1975) was a German cellist.

== Biography ==
Busch was born in Siegen. His father was the violin maker Wilhelm Busch. From the age of nine, he received cello lessons from his father. He then studied at the Academy of Music in Cologne with Friedrich Grützmacher der Jüngere and Paul Grümmer of the Vienna Academy. During the First World War, as a soldier, he was a member of the Brussels Symphony Orchestra. Between 1919 and 1923, he was principal cellist in Bochum; and until 1927 soloist of the Vienna Symphony Orchestra. In 1927, he was a professor at the Folkwangschule in Essen.

At the same time, he became more involved in his activities as a soloist, and as a chamber musician: he played with his brothers Fritz and Adolf. In addition, he was a member of the Duo Wührer, with violinist Karl Doktor (1885–1949) and pianist Friedrich Wührer; a member of the Busch-Serkin trio with his brother Adolf in 1930 (until 1952 when Adolf died), he was the cellist of the Busch Quartet succeeding Paul Grümmer. In 1933, Busch emigrated to Basel in Switzerland, where his brother Adolf was already living. In 1940, he moved to the United States where he was a member of the Adolf Busch's Chamber Orchestra and co-founder of the Marlboro School of Music. In 1954, he was appointed professor at the University of Miami in Coral Gables Florida. He spent his retirement in Peoria and Haverford.

Busch was the brother of conductor Fritz Busch, actor Willi Busch, violinist and composer Adolf Busch and musician Heinrich Busch.

He died in Bryn Mawr, Pennsylvania at age 77.

== Bibliography ==
- Philip, Robert (2001). The New Grove Dictionary of Music and Musicians (edited by Stanley Sadie); Busch, Adolf (Georg Wilhelm). London: Macmillan Publisher. p. 25000. ISBN 9780195170672. Grove 2001.
