= Frida Leider =

German operatic soprano

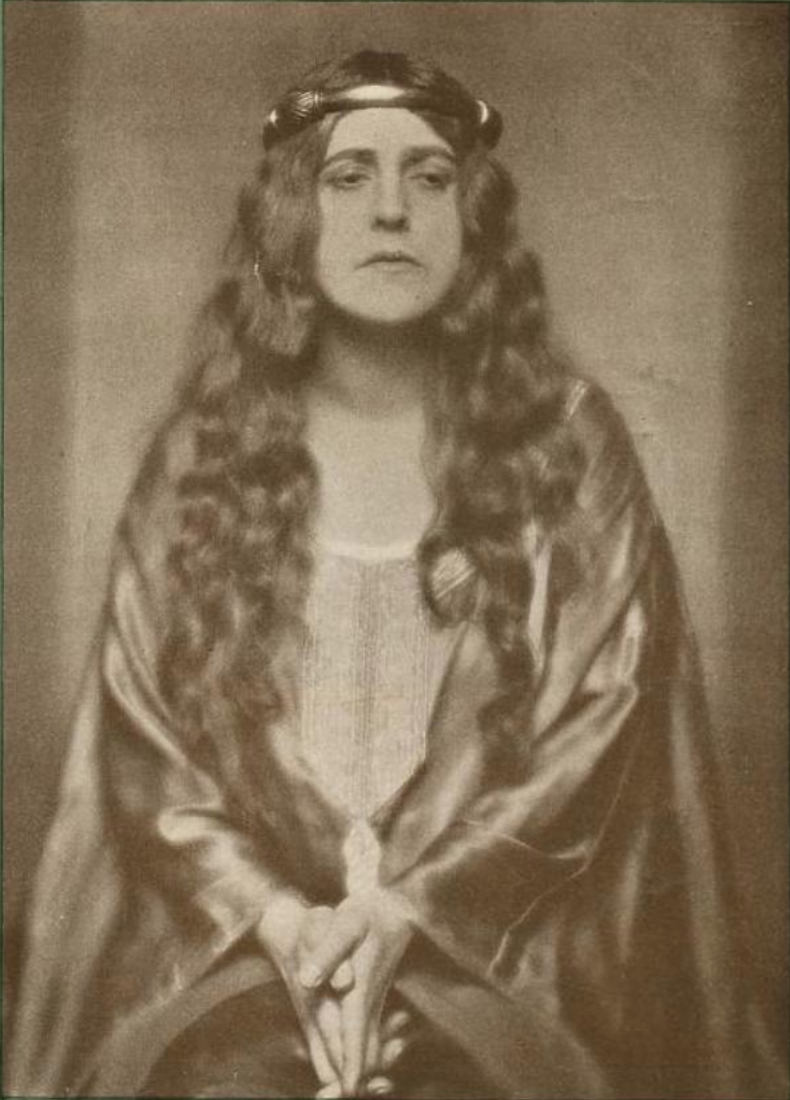
- Frida Leider as Isolde, from a 1929 publication
- Born: 18 April 1888; Berlin, German Empire
- Died: 4 June 1975 (aged 87); West Berlin, West Germany
- Occupation: Opera singer
- Spouse: Rudolf Deman

Frida Leider (18 April 1888 – 4 June 1975) was a German operatic soprano.

Leider was a dramatic soprano. Her most famous roles were Wagner's Isolde and Brünnhilde, Beethoven's Fidelio, Mozart's Donna Anna, and Verdi's Aida and Leonora. She made over 80 recordings, mainly for Polydor and His Master's Voice.

== Life ==
Leider was born in Berlin, where she studied singing while working in a bank. Her first engagements led her to opera houses in Halle, Königsberg, and Rostock. After an engagement with the Hamburg State Opera in 1923, she was hired by the Berlin State Opera as first dramatic soprano. After her retirement from the stage in 1946, she remained there as the director and manager of a studio for the rising singers of the Berlin State Opera.

Leider made regular guest appearances for over 15 years at the Royal Opera House, Covent Garden in London, at the Metropolitan Opera in New York, at La Scala in Milan, and at the State Operas of Vienna and Munich. She also made appearances at the Bayreuth Festival in the 1930s. In the 1920s, she alternated Wagnerian roles with Florence Austral at Covent Garden and the two recorded large parts of The Ring for His Master's Voice.

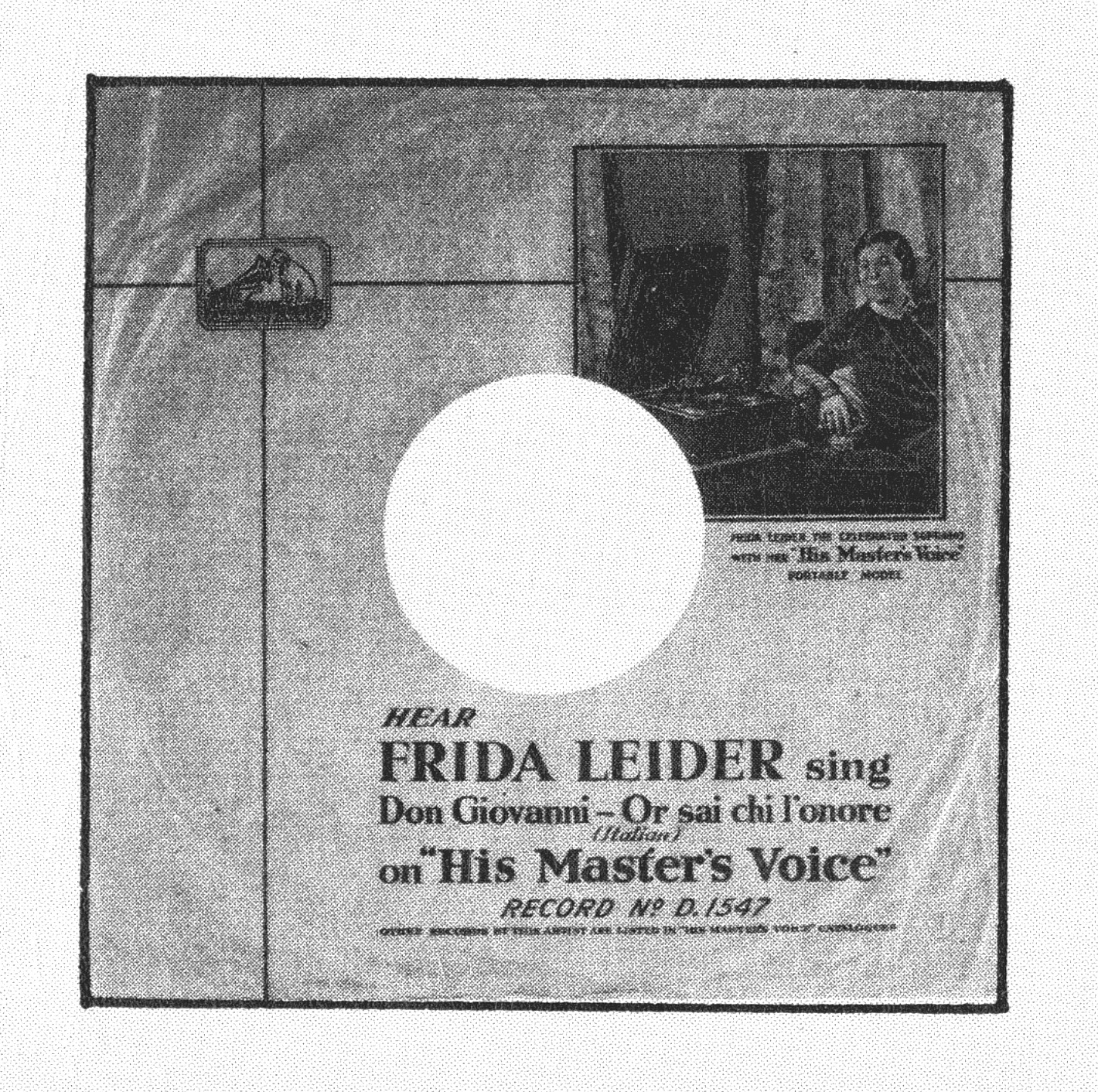
German singer, Frida Leider, record sleeve

Leider married the first concert master of the Berlin State Opera, Rudolf Deman. The couple had no children. She died in her home city of Berlin (in the then-West Berlin part).

Today the singer's estate is managed by the Frida-Leider-Gesellschaft, which is located in Berlin.

== Autobiography ==
Leider's autobiography, Playing My Part, was translated into English by Charles Osborne, and published in London by Calder and Boyars in 1966.
