= Orchestral Suite in G minor, BWV 1070 =

Classical music work by an unknown composer

The Orchestral Suite in G minor, BWV 1070 is a work by an unknown composer. It is part of the Bach-Werke-Verzeichnis catalogue (BWV catalogue) of the works of Johann Sebastian Bach, and sometimes called the "Orchestral Suite No. 5", but was almost certainly not composed by him. It is more likely that the composer was his son Wilhelm Friedemann Bach. It is a French suite with an overture and several dances, which has a similar structure to the 4 orchestral suites known to have been written by J. S. Bach.

== History ==
Modern publications of the suite derive from a collection of manuscript parts prepared by Christian Friedrich Penzel, one of J. S. Bach's last pupils, in 1753. The suite was first published by the Bach Gesellschaft in 1897, in volume 45 of their publication of J. S. Bach's complete works. In 1950, Wolfgang Schmieder assigned to the suite the number 1070 in the Bach-Werke-Verzeichnis (BWV) catalogue.

== Identity of the composer ==
Despite the inclusion of the suite in the BWV catalogue, the suite's composer is not known. The British musicologist Nicholas Kenyon writes that the suite is "certainly not by J. S. Bach", and that it is "likely to be by an unknown composer or possibly W. F. Bach". The American musicologist David Schulenberg, who published a detailed study of the suite in 2010, also considers that W. F. Bach is "the most likely candidate" among the suite's possible composers, citing Wilhelm Friedemann's close relationship with Penzel, the copyist, and stylistic similarities between the suite and Wilhelm Friedemann's other compositions.

== Instrumentation ==
This suite is scored for strings and basso continuo.

== Structure ==
This suite consists of five movements:

1. Larghetto – Un poco allegro (G minor, prelude and double fugue)
2. Torneo (G minor, binary form)
3. Aria (Adagio) (E♭ major, binary form with possible allusions to sonata form)
4. Menuetto alternativo - Trio (G minor, minuet and trio form, trio in G major)
5. Capriccio (G minor, double fugue)

== See also ==
- J. S. Bach: Orchestral Suites Nos. 1-4, BWV 1066-1069
