= Dahlem Cemetery =

Cemetery in Berlin, Germany

Dahlem Cemetery Friedhof Dahlem
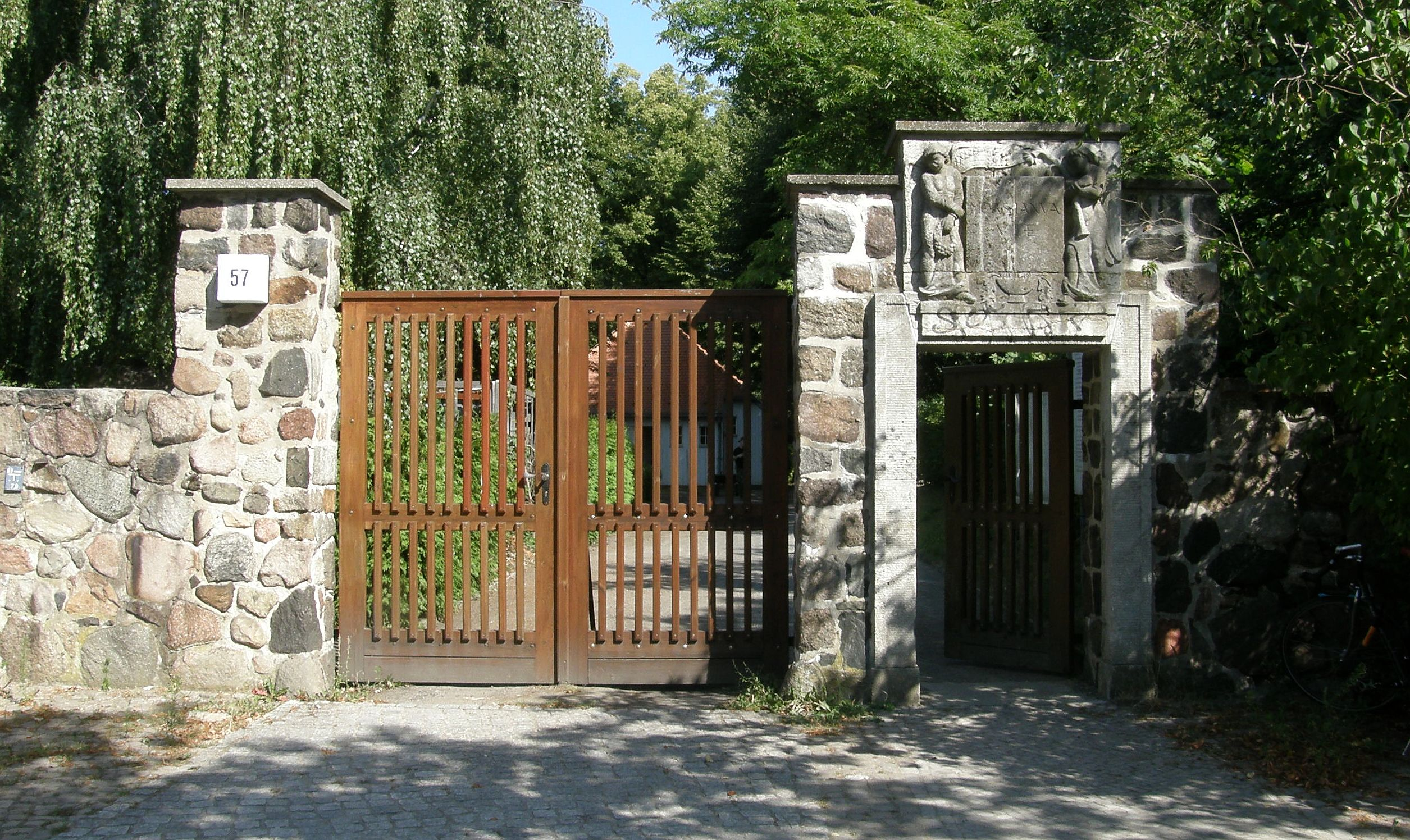
- Interactive map of Dahlem Cemetery; Friedhof Dahlem

Details
- Established: 1908
- Location: Königin-Luise-Straße 57; Berlin-Dahlem
- Country: Germany
- Coordinates: 52°27′32″N 13°17′10″E

The Dahlem Cemetery (German: Friedhof Dahlem, sometimes improperly referred to as Friedhof Dahlem-Dorf), is a cemetery in Berlin-Dahlem. The cemetery was built according to the plans of the architects Friedrich and Wilhelm Hennigs.

== Notable burials ==
- Ernst Otto Beckmann (1853–1923), chemist
- Paul Bildt (1885–1957), film actor
- Emil Bohnke (1888–1928), violist, composer and conductor
- Klaus Croissant (1931–2002), lawyer
- Hermann Diels (1848–1922)
- Heinz Drache (1923–2002)
- Wilhelm Fliess (1858–1928)
- August Gaul (1869–1921)
- Waldemar Grzimek (1918–1984)
- Clemens Hasse (1908–1959)
- Rudolf Havenstein (1857–1923)
- Bernhard Heiliger (1915–1995)
- Fritz Heinemann (1864–1932)
- Werner Hinz (1903–1985)
- Jacobus Henricus van 't Hoff (1852–1911), Dutch physical and organic chemist and Nobel laureate
- Lucie Höflich (1883–1956)
- Ludwig Knaus (1829–1910)
- Albert von Le Coq (1860–1930)
- Lilli Lehmann (1848–1929), opera singer
- Ernst Lindemann (1894–1941), Navy sea captain (cenotaph)
- Friedrich Meinecke (1862–1954), historian
- Rotraut Richter (1915–1947), actress
- Edgar Speyer (1862–1932), financier and philanthropist
- Otto Heinrich Warburg (1883–1970), physiologist, medical doctor and Nobel laureate
- Rainer Zepperitz (1930–2009)
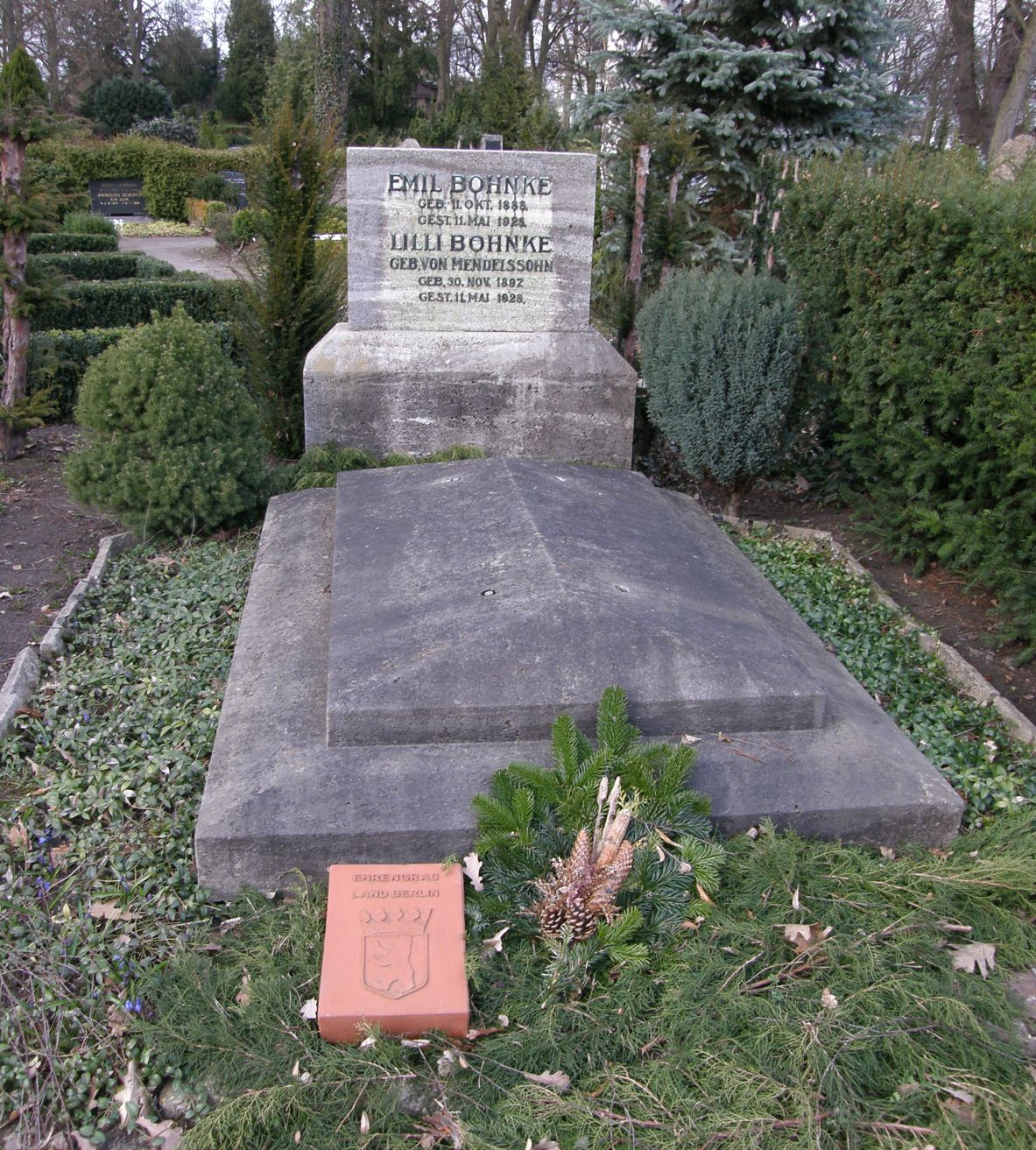
Emil and Lilli Bohnke

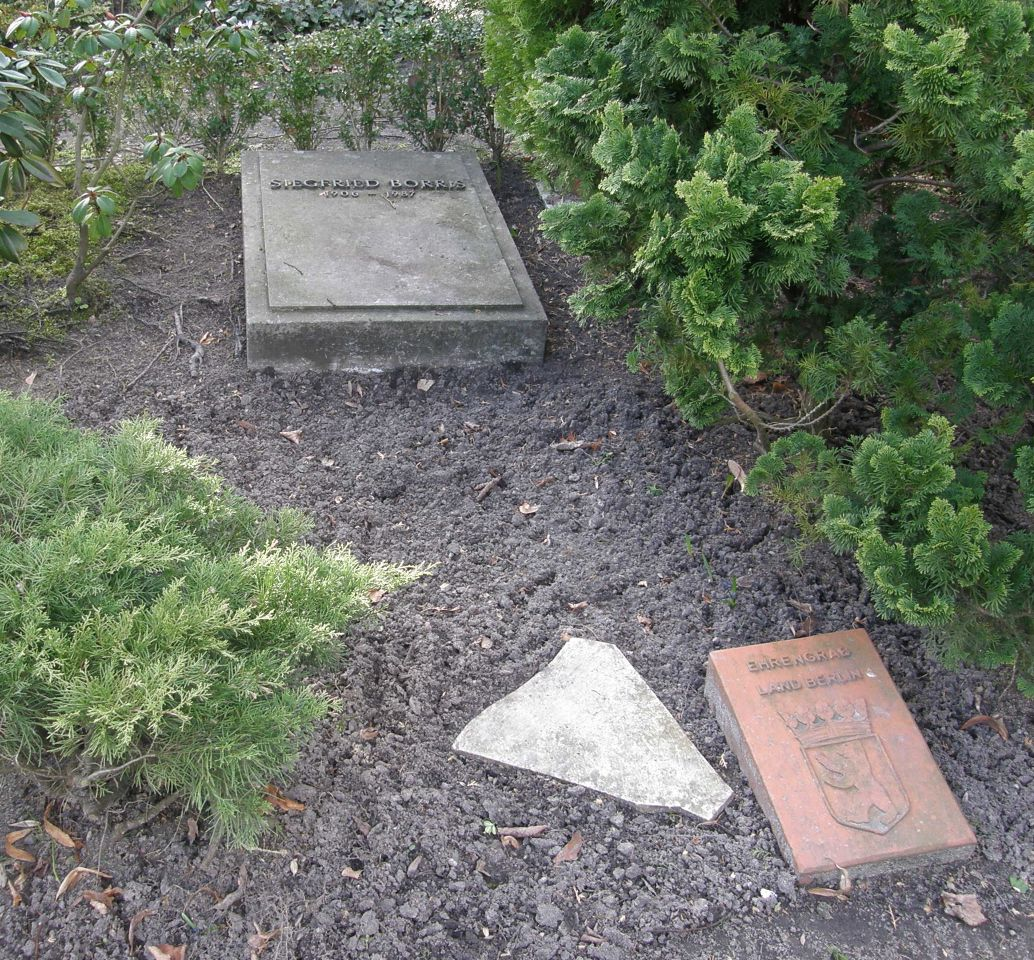
Siegfried Borris

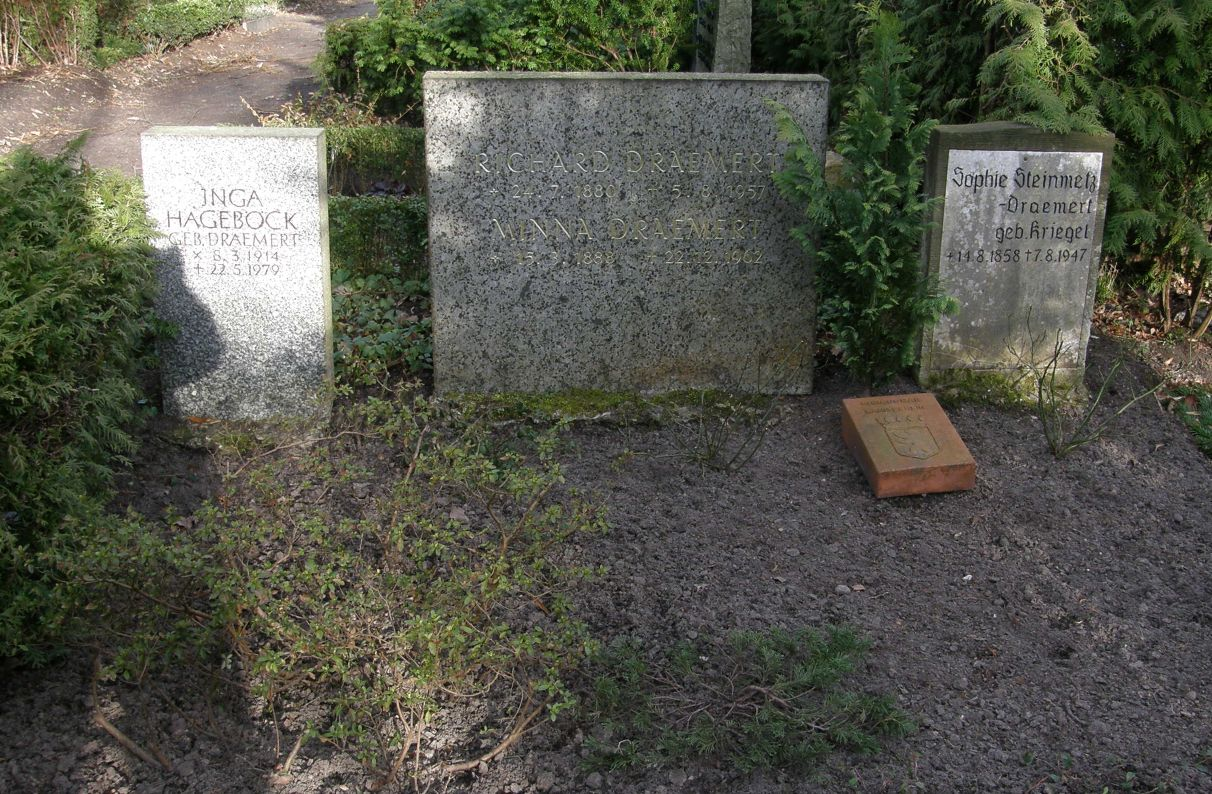
Richard Draemert

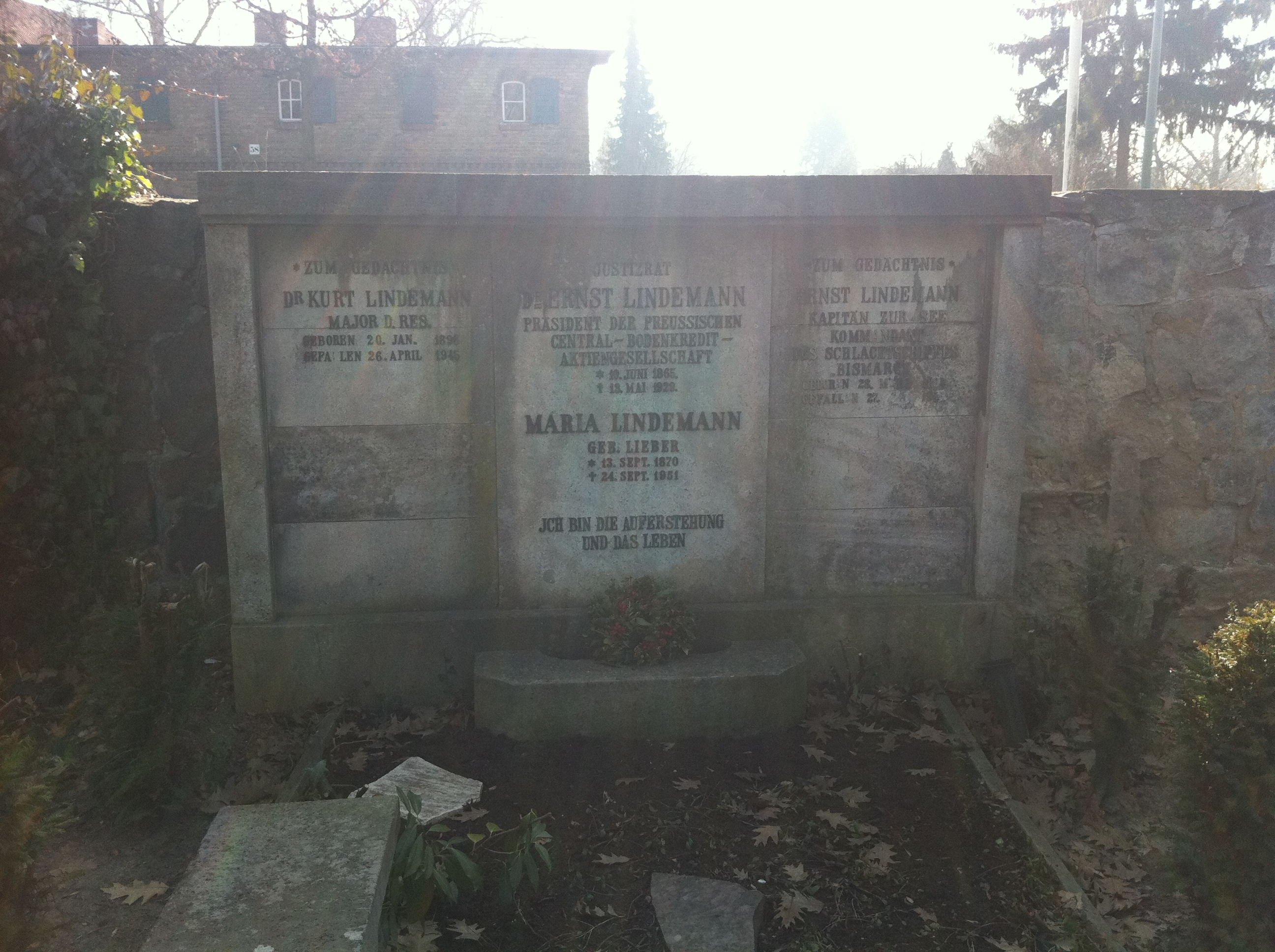
Family Lindemann

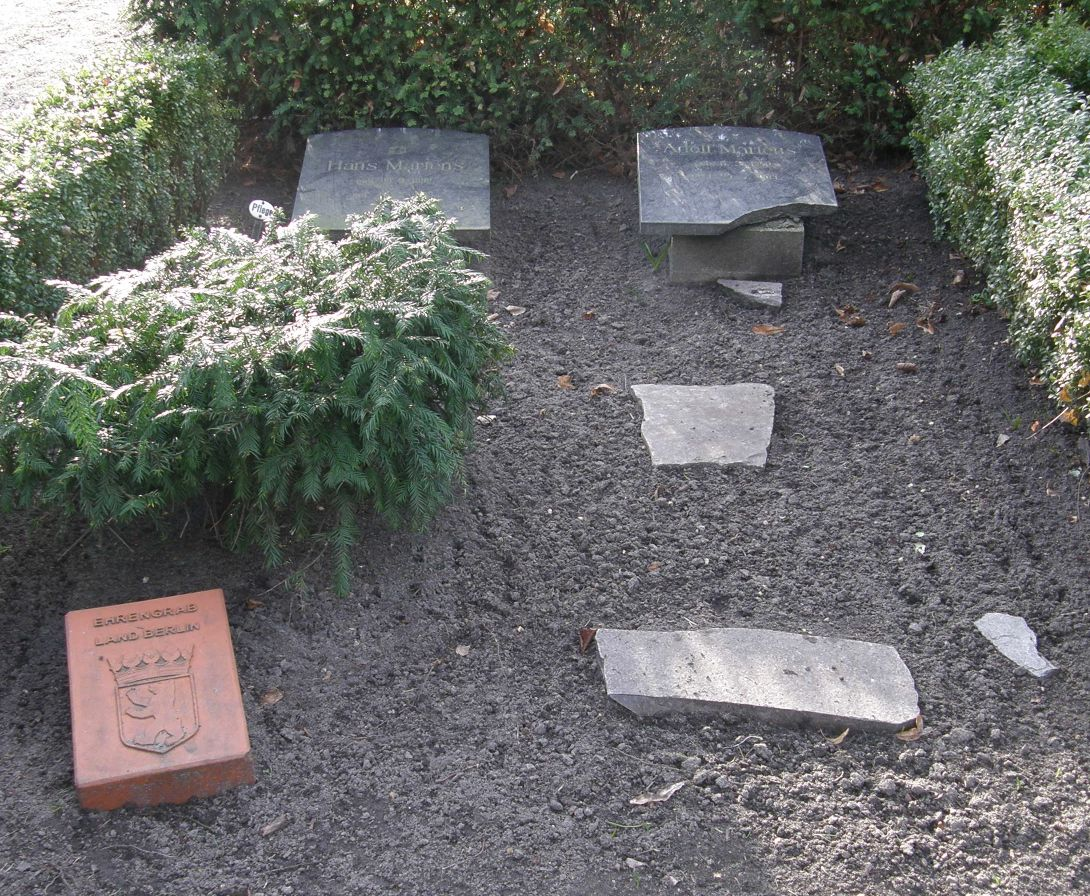
Adolf Martens

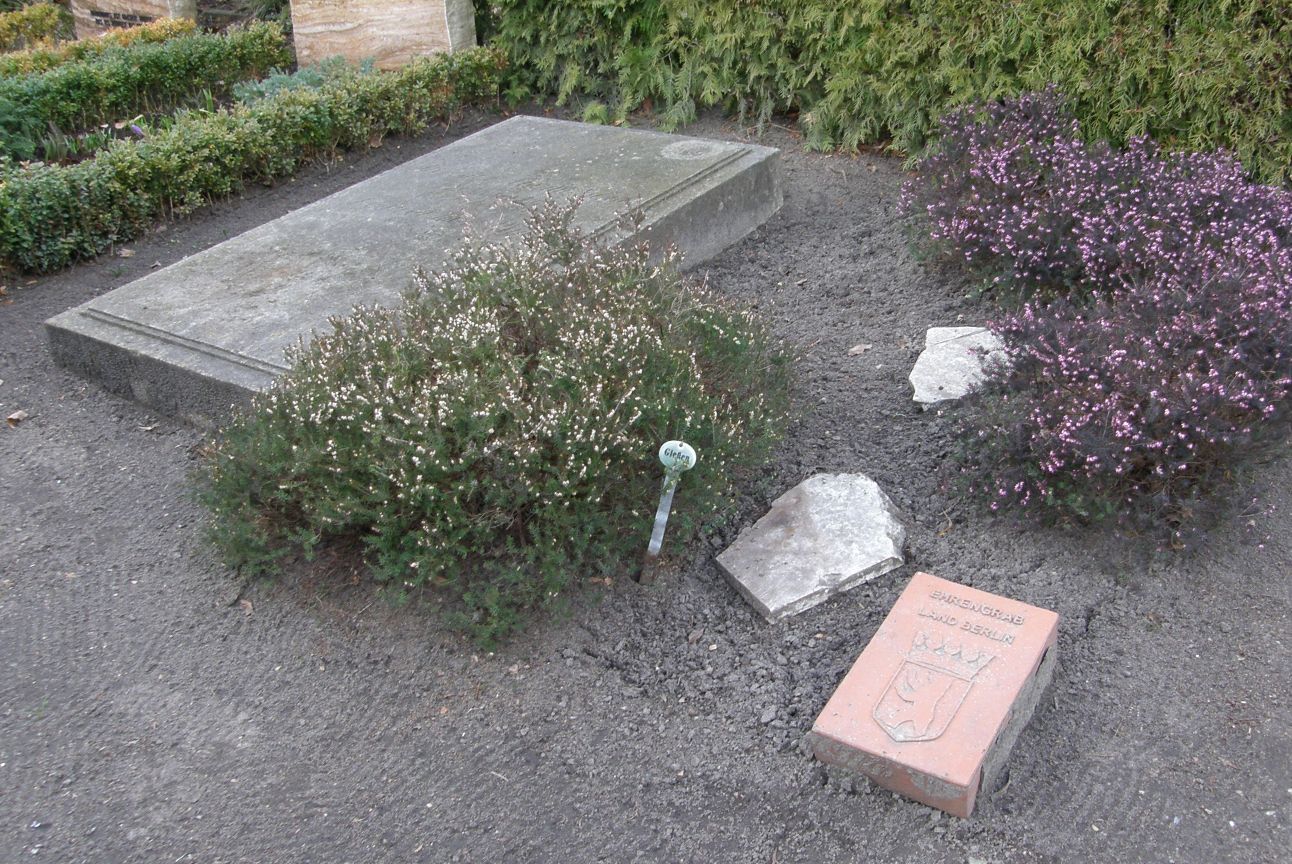
August Gaul

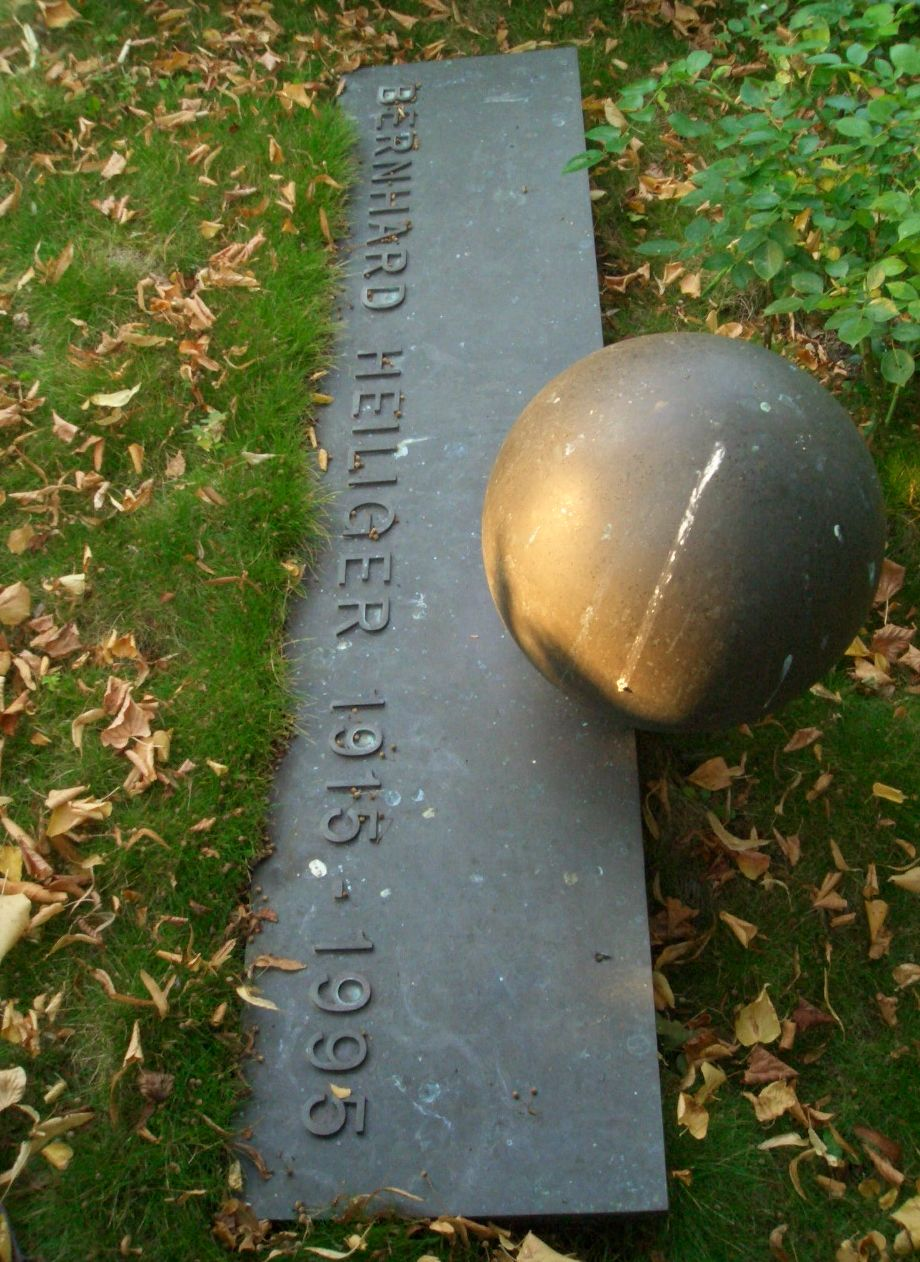
Bernhard Heiliger

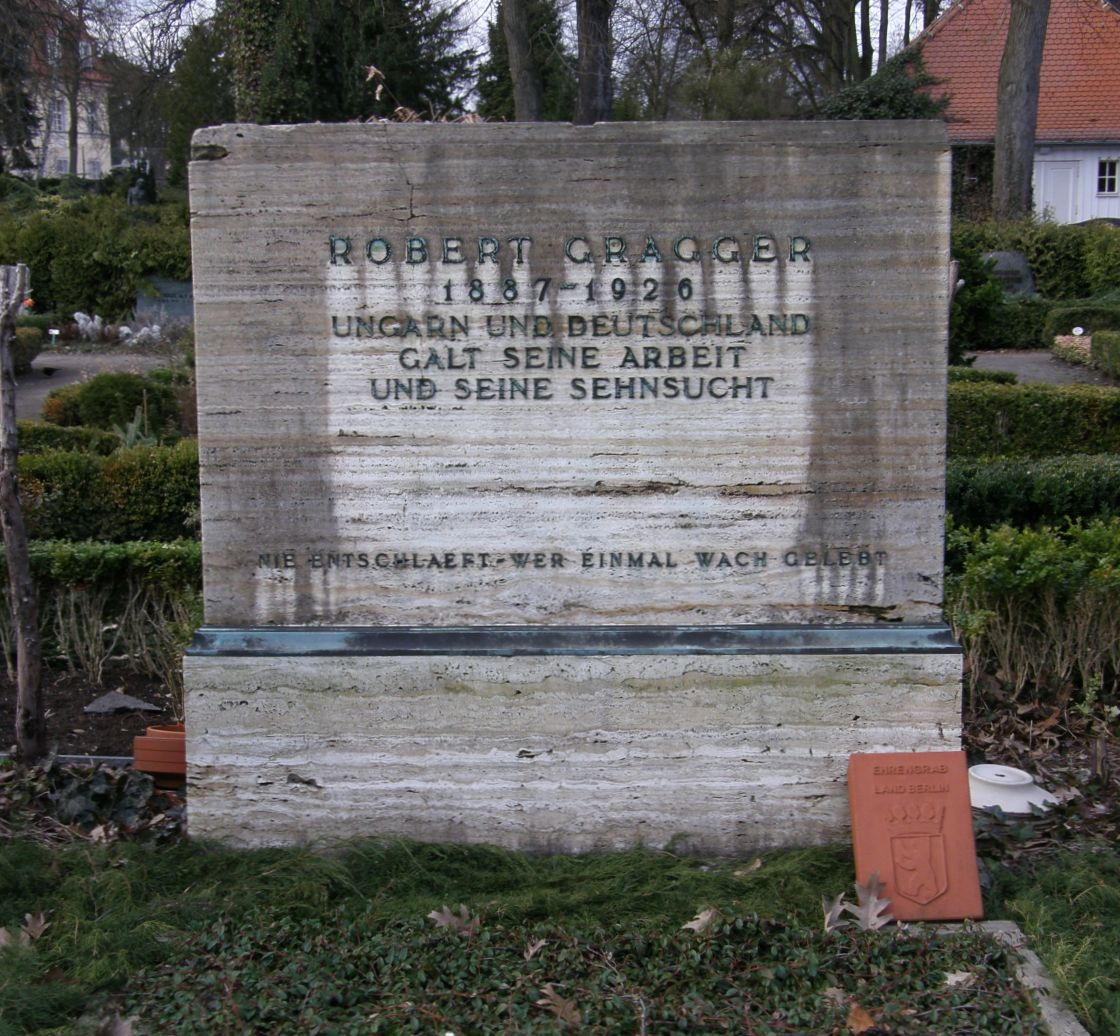
Robert Gragger

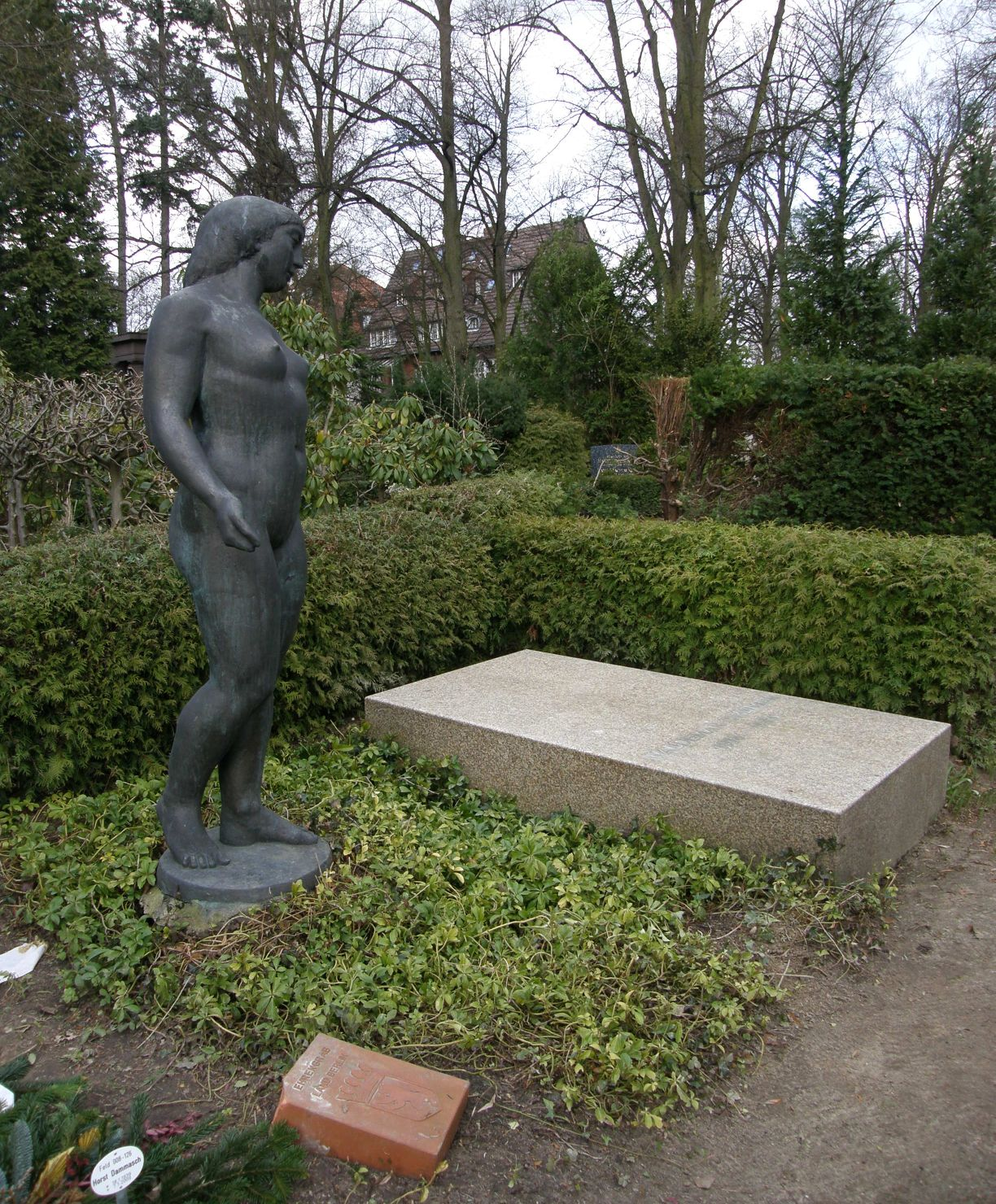
Waldemar Grzimek

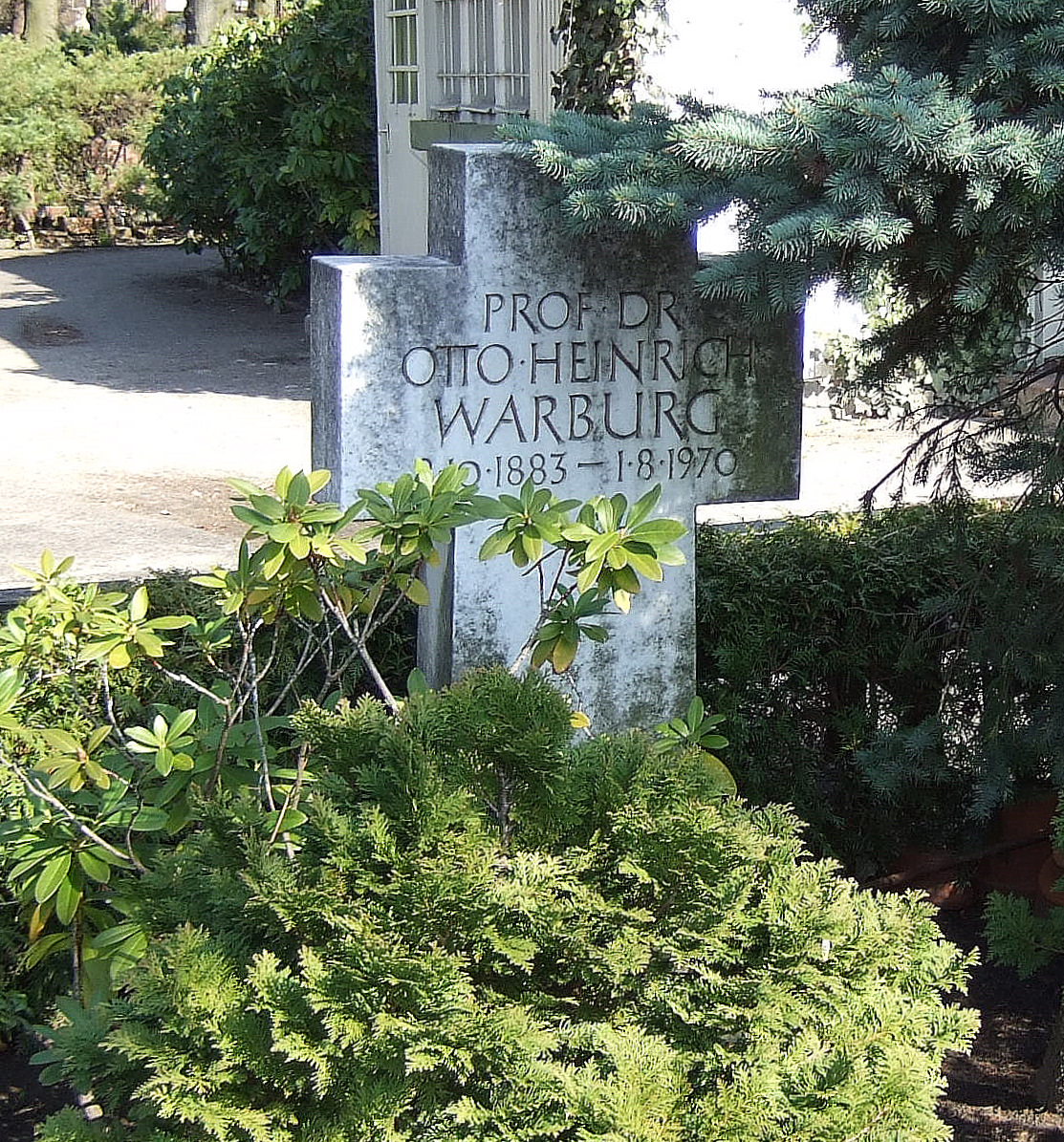
Otto Heinrich Warburg
