= Philipp Naegele =

Violinist and scholar (1928–2011)

Philipp Otto Naegele (January 22, 1928 – January 31, 2011) was a United States–based violinist, violist and scholar.

== Life and career ==
Naegele was born in Stuttgart on January 22, 1928. In 1939 he traveled on the Kindertransport to England to escape Hitler's regime and in 1940 he was reunited with his parents in New York City.

Though Naegele began his studies privately he was admitted to the High School of Music and Art, then on to Queens College and completed a doctorate in musicology at Princeton University. He also received a Fulbright Scholarship, allowing him to study at the Vienna Academy of Music under Franz Samohyl.

In 1956 to 1964 he played with the Cleveland Orchestra. He taught at Smith College as well as being William R. Kenan Professor of Music Emeritus, teaching at Smith College and Amherst College.

He was known for his involvement with the Marlboro Music Festival, which he had performed at since its inception. At Marlboro College he was under the tutelage of Adolf Busch, who he called his "idol".

== Selected writings ==
- Naegele, Philipp (2001). "Ambros, August Wilhelm". Grove Music Online. Oxford: Oxford University Press. doi:10.1093/gmo/9781561592630.article.00748. ISBN 978-1-56159-263-0. (subscription, Wikilibrary access, or UK public library membership required)
