= Staatskapelle Berlin =

German orchestra

- Orchestra
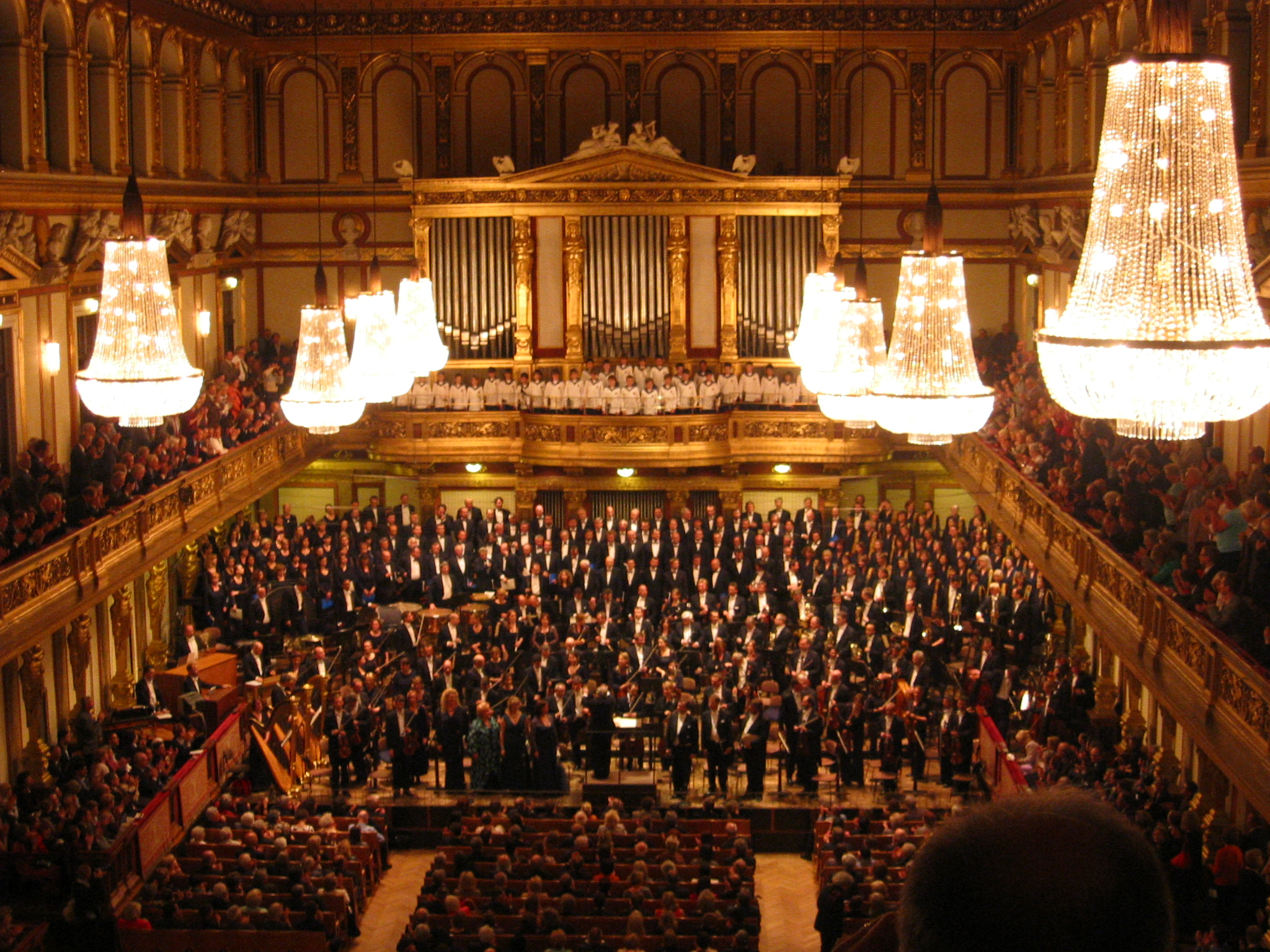
- Pierre Boulez and the Staatskapelle at the Musikverein, April 2009
- Former name: Kurbrandenburgische Hofkapelle; Königlich Preußische Hofkapelle
- Founded: 1570
- Location: Berlin, Germany
- Music director: Christian Thielemann
- Website: staatskapelle-berlin.de

The Staatskapelle Berlin (German: [ˈʃtaːtskaˌpɛlə bɛʁˈliːn]) is a German orchestra and the resident orchestra of the Berlin State Opera, Unter den Linden. The orchestra is one of the oldest in the world. Until the fall of the German Empire in 1918 the orchestra's name was Königliche Kapelle, i.e., Royal Orchestra.

== History ==
The orchestra traces its roots to 1570, when Joachim II Hector, Elector of Brandenburg established the rules for an orchestra at his court which had been constituted, at an unknown date. In 1701, the affiliation of the Electors of Brandenburg to the position of King of Prussia led to the description of the orchestra as Königlich Preußische Hofkapelle ("Royal Prussian Court Orchestra"), which consisted of about 30 musicians. The orchestra became affiliated with the Royal Court Opera, established in 1742 by Frederick the Great. Noted musicians associated with the orchestra have included Carl Philipp Emanuel Bach, Franz Benda, and Johann Joachim Quantz.

The first concert by the ensemble for a wider audience outside of the royal courts was on 1 March 1783 at the Hotel Paris, led by Johann Friedrich Reichardt, the ensemble's Kapellmeister. After the advent of Giacomo Meyerbeer as Kapellmeister, from 1842, the role of the orchestra expanded and a first annual concert series for subscribers was launched. The orchestra gave a number of world and German premieres of works by Richard Wagner, Felix Mendelssohn, and Otto Nicolai.

The orchestra's music director, the Staatskapellmeister, holds the same post with the Berlin State Opera. The orchestra was in the eastern part of Berlin, and thus was part of East Germany from 1945 to 1990.

The former Staatskapellmeister of the orchestra and the opera was Daniel Barenboim. Barenboim was granted the title of "conductor for life" for the ensemble in 2000. In July 2013, the orchestra made its first-ever appearances at the BBC Proms, performing the four operas of Der Ring des Nibelungen, the first complete Ring cycle to be given in a single Proms season. In January 2017, the orchestra and Barenboim performed the complete symphonies of Anton Bruckner at Carnegie Hall, the first live Bruckner symphony cycle ever performed in the United States. In July 2017, the orchestra was the first non-UK orchestra to perform the two completed symphonies of Edward Elgar at the Proms in a single season. Barenboim and the orchestra have made recordings for the Teldec, Deutsche Grammophon, and Decca labels.

In January 2023, Barenboim resigned as Generalmusikdirektor (GMD) of the orchestra for health reasons. In September 2023, the Berlin Senate and the Berlin State Opera announced the appointment of Christian Thielemann as its next GMD, effective 1 September 2024, an appointment which encompasses the post of GMD of the Staatskapelle Berlin. In October 2026, the Berlin State Opera announced an extension of Thielemann's contract as GMD through the 2033–2034 season, which incorporates the parallel contract as chief conductor of the Staatskapelle Berlin.

== Leadership ==
- Johann Friedrich Agricola (1759–1775)
- Johann Friedrich Reichardt (Hofkapellmeister, 1775–1794)
- Bernhard Anselm Weber (1816–1820)
- Gaspare Spontini (1820–1841)
- Giacomo Meyerbeer (1842–1846)
- Otto Nicolai (1848–1849)
- Robert Radecke (Hofkapellmeister, 1871–1887)
- Joseph Sucher (1888–1899)
- Richard Strauss (1899–1913)
- Leo Blech (Hofkapellmeister, 1913–1920)
- Erich Kleiber (1923–1934)
- Clemens Krauss (1935–1936)
- Herbert von Karajan (1941–1945)
- Joseph Keilberth (1948–1951)
- Erich Kleiber (1954–1955)
- Franz Konwitschny (1955–1962)
- Otmar Suitner (1964–1990)
- Daniel Barenboim (1992–2023)
- Christian Thielemann (2024–present)

=== Honorary conductors ===
- Otmar Suitner (1990)
- Pierre Boulez (2005)
- Zubin Mehta (2014)
- Daniel Barenboim – Honorary chief conductor (2024)
- Simon Rattle (2026)
