= Paul Grümmer =

Paul Von Grümmer
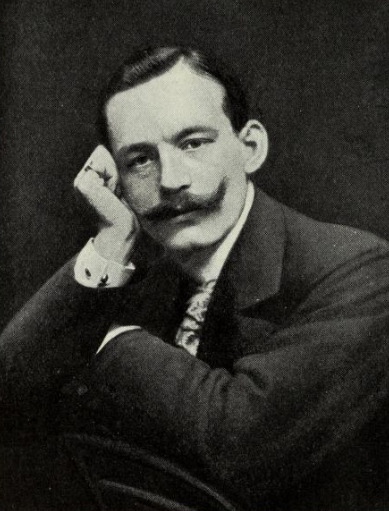

Background information
- Born: Paul Grümmer; 26 February 1879; Gera, Germany
- Died: 30 October 1965 (aged 86) Zug, Switzerland
- Instrument: Cello

Paul Grümmer (26 February 1879 – 30 October 1965) was a German-born cellist and teacher.

Grümmer was born in Gera in Thuringia. He studied at the Leipzig Conservatory with Julius Klengel.

He was well known as a member of the Busch Quartet, founded by Adolf Busch. He taught at the Vienna Conservatory, and his students include German-born conductor and cellist Nikolaus Harnoncourt and child prodigy Elsa Hilger.

Among his pedagogical works:

Grümmer, Paul (1942). Die Grundlage der Klassischen und Virtuosen Technik auf dem Violoncello / Les Bases de la technique et de la virtuosité de violoncelle. Vienna: Universal Edition. ISBN 978-3-70243-914-9. UE11229.

Grümmer, Paul (1954). Harmonische neue tägliche Übungen: für Violoncello. Berlin: Bote & Bock. OCLC 1350170068.
