= Adolf Busch =

German–Swiss violinist and composer (1891–1952)

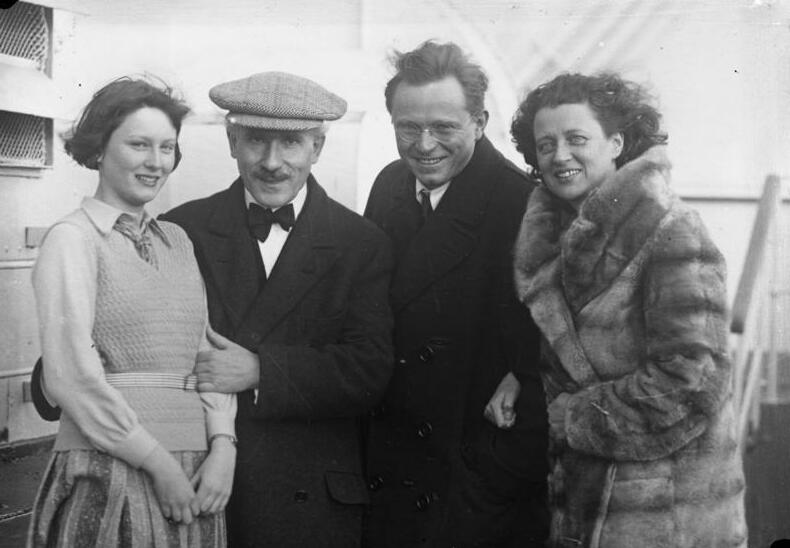
Busch, his wife and daughter, with Arturo Toscanini (wearing a hat)

Adolf Georg Wilhelm Busch (8 August 1891 – 9 June 1952) was a German-Swiss violinist, conductor, and composer.

== Life and career ==
Busch was born in Siegen in Westphalia. He studied at the Cologne Conservatory with Willy Hess and Bram Eldering. His composition teacher was Fritz Steinbach but he also learned much from his future father-in-law Hugo Grüters in Bonn.

In 1912, Busch founded the Vienna Konzertverein Quartet, consisting of the principals from the Konzertverein orchestra, which made its debut at the 1913 Salzburg Festival. After World War I, he founded the Busch Quartet, which from the 1920–21 season included Gösta Andreasson, violin, Karl Doktor, viola, and Paul Grümmer, cello. The quartet was in existence with varying personnel until 1951.

The additional member of the circle was Rudolf Serkin, who became Busch's duo partner at 18 and eventually married Busch's daughter, Irene, 1935 in Basel. The Busch Quartet and Serkin became the nucleus of the Busch Chamber Players, founded in Basel, a forerunner of modern chamber orchestras.

In 1927, with the rise of Adolf Hitler, Busch decided he could not in good conscience stay in Germany, so he emigrated to Basel, Switzerland. Busch was not Jewish and was popular in Germany, but firmly opposed Nazism from the beginning. On 1 April 1933, he repudiated Germany altogether and in 1938, he boycotted Italy. As the Nazis tried to convince him to return to Germany, he declared that he would "return with joy on the day that Hitler, Goebbels und Göring are publicly hanged." In 1935, he became a Swiss citizen of Riehen, Basel. During 12 years in Basel and besides his many concerts around the world, he founded a chamber orchestra in Basel, was a co-founder of the Lucerne Festival in 1938, together with Arturo Toscanini and his conducting brother Fritz Busch, and taught many students in Basel, among them Yehudi Menuhin. His little orchestra, the Busch Chamber Players, was first heard at the 1935 Maggio Musicale in Florence, performing Bach's Brandenburg Concertos in two concerts. The concertos were recorded in London that year. On the outbreak of World War II, Busch emigrated from Basel to the United States in 1939, where he eventually settled in Vermont. There, he founded a new version of the Busch Chamber Players who gave concerts in New York and toured, first as the Busch Little Symphony and then the Busch Symphony Orchestra. In 1950 Busch's dream of a summer school for chamber music was realised when, with brother Herman, Rudolf Serkin and the Moyse family, he founded the Marlboro Music School and Festival.

The Busch Quartet was particularly admired for its interpretations of Brahms, Schubert, and above all Beethoven. It made a series of recordings in the 1930s that included many of these composers' works for string quartet. In 1941, it set down three Beethoven quartets that it had not previously recorded, including Op. 130. The Busch Quartet never recorded the Grosse Fuge, Op. 133; an arrangement was recorded by the Busch Chamber Players, with Busch leading from the first violin desk.

Busch was a great soloist, as well as a chamber musician, and live recordings exist of him playing the Beethoven, Brahms, Dvorák and Busoni Concertos, as well as the Brahms Double Concerto. In the studio he recorded concertos and chamber orchestra performances of Bach and Mozart, and of the Concerti grossi, op.6 by Handel; his recordings of Bach's Brandenburg Concertos brought them to prominence after many years of relative obscurity. He had a highly individual tone and great technique. Among his students were Stefi Geyer, Erica Morini and Yehudi Menuhin.

As a composer, Busch was influenced by Max Reger. He was among the first to compose a Concerto for Orchestra, in 1929. A number of his compositions have been recorded, including the Violin Concerto (A minor, Op. 20, published 1922), String Sextet (G major, Op. 40), Quintet for Saxophone and String Quartet, Violin Sonata No. 2, Op. 56, Clarinet Sonata, and several large scale works for organ. Regarding the last, Busch once remarked that if he could come back after his death he would like to return as an organist.

He was the son of the luthier Wilhelm Busch; brother of the conductor Fritz Busch, the cellist Hermann Busch, the pianist Heinrich Busch and the actor Willi Busch, father in law of the pianist Rudolf Serkin and maternal grandfather of the pianist Peter Serkin and the cellist Judith Serkin. An exhaustive two-volume biography of Busch by Tully Potter was published in 2010 by Toccata Press In November 2015, Warner Classics released a 16-CD collection of Busch's recordings of Bach, Beethoven, Schubert, Brahms, and other composers.
