= Stefan Weintraub =

German jazz musician

Stefan Weintraub (1897 – 10 September 1981), nicknamed "Steps", was a German jazz musician (piano, drums), bandleader of the Weintraubs Syncopators and Australian mechanic.

== Life and career ==
Born in Breslau, Weintraub began an apprenticeship in the pharmacy trade in 1913 after finishing school in his hometown and was drafted for military service in 1916. After returning from the Great War, he moved to Berlin, where he worked in the food industry. Jazz, the new American dance music, fascinated him; Weintraub was so talented as a pianist that he could effortlessly play tracks. Together with Horst Graff, a Berliner eight years younger, who played the saxophone and also possessed organisational talent, he founded the Tanzkapelle Stefan Weintraub, which soon received the name Weintraubs Syncopators. In 1924, the five-member band performed for the first time.

The Weintraubs Syncopators had such success that its members became professional musicians and expanded the band. Among the members was the chemistry student Ansco Bruinier, who had received cello lessons, but also played the trumpet, saxophone and susaphone and was proficient in artificial whistling as well as singing. His brother Franz S. Bruinier was Bertolt Brecht's first composer. As a pianist and composer, Franz Bruinier participated in musical-literary events, the so-called MA (for "Monday Evening"), in which he involved the Syncopators. It was here that Friedrich Hollaender got to know the group and involved them in the revues he supervised, taking on the piano part himself. As early as 1927, the band therefore appeared in Max Reinhardt's revues "Was sie wollen", "Hetärengespräche", "Das bist du", "Das spricht Bände" and "Bei uns um die Gedächtniskirche rum". When Hollaender joined the band, Stefan Weintraub switched from piano to drums. The band name on the bass drum was now "Weintraubs Syncopators". They were painted on canvas by Max Oppenheimer in 1927.

What was fascinating about Weintraub's Syncopators was their musical and stylistic versatility between classical parody, Latin American dances, Viennese waltzes, French cabaret chansons, swing music and Chicago jazz: the individual musicians changed several instruments in one title; between the pieces they also changed their clothes to match the respective theme. They also entertained the audience by imitating animal voices, using other instruments, unusual equipment such as kitchen utensils as instruments, or by assuming unusual positions (e.g. lying on the floor) to play. They combined theatrical, grotesque and clownish elements with musical entertainment and jazz in such a virtuoso way that Weintraub's Syncopators were soon recognised as the most sought-after stage show orchestra in Berlin. In the revue "Bitte einsteigen" they appeared as accompanists and fellow players of Josephine Baker at the Theater des Westens. In 1928, the first recordings were made. The band at that time consisted of Friedrich Hollaender (piano), Stefan Weintraub (drums), Paul Aronovici (trumpet), John Kaiser (trombone), Horst Graff (clarinet, alto saxophone), Freddy Wise (tenor saxophone, bass saxophone and clarinet), Cyril "Baby" Schulvater (banjo and guitar) and Ansco Bruinier (trumpet, tuba and bass). Stefan Weintraub had the skills of a bandleader and provided the artistic and the human cohesion between the different musicians.

The Syncopators were also involved in the scandalous premiere of Walter Mehring's play The Merchant of Berlin at the Berlin Volksbühne on 6 September 1929, for which Hanns Eisler had written the music. They also appeared in the film The Blue Angel, which Joseph von Sternberg directed in 1930. The jazz arrangements were by Franz Waxman, Hollaender's successor as the group's pianist. Hollaender brought the band in for some recordings, where they operated as "Friedrich Hollaender und seine Jazzsymphoniker". Presumably the Syncopators were also involved in recordings by Peter Kreuder and Marlene Dietrich. Also in 1930, they appeared with Paul Morgan, Max Hansen and the tenor Carl Jöken in the cabaret sound film Das Kabinett des Dr. Larifari directed by Robert Wohlmuth. In 1933, the Weintraubs Syncopators played alongside Hans Albers in the UFA film Heut' kommt's drauf. This was the last of 20 feature films they were involved in before being banned from performing in Germany as so-called "non-Aryans". They undertook extensive tours abroad - even to the Soviet Union (1935, 1936) and Japan (1937). The group wanted to emigrate to Australia. With a lucrative contract, the Weintraubs Syncopators arrived in Australia in July 1937, where a tour lasting several months began in October. The Australian audience reacted enthusiastically, but the musicians' union resisted the successful group, at that time still the best-known German jazz group internationally, with all means at its disposal.

Weintraub wrote to the Department of Home Affairs in Canberra in October 1937 that he wanted to settle in Australia. As foreign musicians were not usually granted work permits, Weintraub agreed to return to his old profession. Secretly, he hoped to be allowed to continue performing as a musician. Indeed, in December 1938, one of Sydney's most elegant restaurants hired Weintraub's Syncopators. The "Musikergewerkschaft" ensured that a local group was also engaged. This reduced the number of performances for the Syncopators. After the outbreak of war, further restrictions followed: Weintraub, like other members of the Syncopators, was interned in June 1940 as an "enemy alien" because of his German citizenship. It was considered suspicious that he had fought as a soldier on the German side in the First World War and had received the Iron Cross. In September 1941, Weintraub was finally released from the internment camp. Members of an Australian band criticised Weintraub's "premature release" and, together with the head of the musicians' union, ensured that Weintraub was not given any opportunities to perform. Weintraub worked as a mechanic in Sydney. It was not until October 1945 that Weintraub was granted Australian citizenship. He was only able to play music on the side. In Sydney's emigrant scene, he was regularly seen at German-language performances, at revues and colourful evenings of the Kleines Wiener Theater, where he played piano or drums. He willingly and modestly made himself available for all musical tasks.

== Film adaptation ==
With their film "Weintraubs Syncopators. Bis ans Ende der Welt" (Cine Impuls 2000, Berlin) in 2000, Jörg Süßenbach and Klaus Sander created a memorial to the almost forgotten band Weintraubs.
