= Baal (EP) =

EP by David Bowie
- Released: 26 February 1982
- Recorded: September 1981
- Studio: Hansa by the Wall, Berlin
- Genre: Cabaret; art song; traditional music; avant-garde
- Length: 11:14
- Label: RCA
- Producer: Tony Visconti; David Bowie

David Bowie chronology
Changestwobowie (1981)	Baal (1982)	Rare (1982)

Music video
- "The Drowned Girl" on YouTube

Baal is an EP by the English musician David Bowie, comprising recordings of songs written for Bertolt Brecht's play Baal. It is sometimes referred to as David Bowie in Bertolt Brecht's Baal, as credited on the sleeve. The EP was Bowie's final release of new material for RCA Records; he signed with EMI Records for his next album. It was released to positive reviews and reached number 29 on the UK Singles Chart, an unusual achievement for a non-pop release.

== Background ==
In August 1981, Bowie had begun rehearsals to appear in the BBC version of Baal. The lyrics to the songs were all translated by Ralph Manheim and John Willett. Bowie did not think of the television play as a success on broadcast due to its cinematography, but had grown to appreciate it by 1983. Dominic Muldowney provided all new musical settings, except for "The Drowned Girl", which was a setting by Kurt Weill done originally for Das Berliner Requiem. In September 1981, Bowie and Tony Visconti returned to the Hansa studios in Berlin to re-record the five songs Baal performed in the play.

It was Bowie's final session at Hansa; he had previously recorded Low (1977) at the studio and mixed "Heroes" (1977) there too. Additionally, he produced Iggy Pop's albums The Idiot and Lust for Life (both 1977) at the studio too. There was an additional significance to Hansa, as Brecht's future composing partner Kurt Weill also once worked at the studios. Bowie and Visconti utilised Weill's favourite recording set-up, namely "a German theater band, one player per instrument, all arranged in a semi-circle." Bowie would employ this set-up again in the music video for this next single, "Wild Is the Wind".

=== Composition ===
"Baal's Hymn" is a combination of the vignettes spread throughout the play and establishes Baal's amoral character. "Remembering Marie A." concerns Baal's reminiscences of a past conquest, where he can remember a cloud drifting overhead but not the face of the girl he was with. "Ballad of the Adventurers" is Baal's aggressive lament to the death of his mother. "The Drowned Girl" relates the suicide of one of Baal's conquests – a video clip for this song was shot by David Mallet at the same time as the one for "Wild is the Wind". "The Dirty Song" is a short number, with Baal humiliating his lover Sophie.

Ignatiy Vishnevetsky of The A.V. Club describes Baal as the culmination of "Bowie's longstanding interest in theater and the German art song tradition", and notes that, as the artist's final recording at Hansa by the Wall, the EP "served as Bowie’s informal farewell to Germany and the avant-garde". Harlow Star reviewer Roger Fulton said the songs were characterised by Bowie's "soulful" voice over "a relatively sparse score – no big production numbers, and no rock operatics. Unusual, but by no means inaccessible." Visconti said: "The music is very theatrical, it is definitely not rock and roll." "Baal's Hymn" has been highlighted by several writers; Vishnevetsky says it "combines several poems from the play into one song" and demonstrates Bowie's sense of phrasing. Arranged as a lengthy ballad, the track is "given shape and variety by occasional stanzas in an Eislerish marching rhythm with semitone shifts of key", according to Willett. On the other hand, "Remembering Marie A." is a Brecht poem, presented in the setting by Franz Servatius Bruinier (again with Muldowney's arrangement).

== Release ==
RCA Records hoped to include the Baal material as part of a new Bowie album, but the singer's reluctance to record major material for the label forced them to release the work as a single EP, ahead of the TV play's transmission on 2 March 1982. Bowie financed the EP himself; as Tony Visconti recalls, "RCA didn't like the idea, they thought it was an uncommercial enterprise." Released on 26 February 1982, Baal appeared as a seven-inch EP in the UK, but in the United States, where the EP format was unpopular, RCA adapted it into a 12-inch record. The American and Canadian arms of RCA Records were unprepared for the record's content, given its lack of rock music.

Bowie's performance as Baal was transmitted on 2 March 1982, and RCA issued the EP to coincide with this. Both the play and EP were well received, with the latter reaching No. 29 in the UK chart, commendable considering the unconventional tracks. In addition to the 7" edition, which came packaged in a double gatefold sleeve containing extensive notes pertaining to the musical content and a short biography of Bertolt Brecht, the EP was released as a 12", which gained it some play in clubs as well as radio airplay. It would mark Bowie's final new release for RCA Records. Bowie's next release was issued by EMI.

According to Bowie biographer David Buckley, Baal "must be the least commercial record ever to chart in the UK Top 30. At the time, Bowie's fan base was so huge in the UK that even something as decidedly non-pop as this made the UK charts." The author Michael Ingham writes that, despite low chart expectations, the chart success of Baal marked Brecht and Weill's "second major brush" with the Anglophonic pop music charts, following the adaption of "Die Mortiat von Mackie Messer" (from The Threepenny Opera) into the swing song "Mack the Knife", a hit for Louis Armstrong in 1955 and Bobby Darin in 1959.

Chris Bohn of the New Musical Express described Baal as one of "three bizarre single collaborations" that Bowie released between Scary Monsters (and Super Creeps) (1980) and Let's Dance (1983), alongside "Under Pressure" with Queen and "Cat People (Putting Out Fire)" with Giorgio Moroder. Dave Marsh of Rolling Stone noted that it was one of three Bowie soundtrack releases within months of each other – alongside "Cat People" and Christiane F. – that proved Bowie's contract with RCA had ended.

== Critical reception ==
Professional ratings
Review scores
Source	Rating
AllMusic	4/5 stars
The Journal-Herald	B

Among contemporary reviews of Baal, the Evening Telegraph wrote that the EP allowed listeners to remind themselves of "the decadence-ridden music" of the television adaptation. Terry Lawson of The Journal-Herald believed only Bowie fans would enjoy the release and opined that, as none of the compositions are as strong as Brecht's later work with Kurt Weill, the release is "mostly interesting for the novelty of hearing Bowie tackle the kind of material that serves as inspiration for his own artier, cabaret-influenced songs." A reviewer for Melody Maker found Bowie's interest in Brecht unsurprising, given the "drama, angst, brutal descriptiveness and vivid seediness" in the latter's work and his relocation to Berlin. The reviewer wrote that "Bowie's back to sounding like Anthony Newley and appears to bleed a great deal in the process." Joe Selvin of The San Francisco Examiner wrote that Bowie adapted the lurid lyrics to "symphonic-style accompaniment", "digging into the arcane numbers as passionately as Anthony Newley might, in an extraordinary, powerful performance that marks Bowie as one of the most provocative interpreters of popular music to emerge from the rock field."

The Kitchener-Waterloo Record emphasised that Baal contains traditional material "and definitely not rock and roll", finding it "loaded with unusual pictures", and believed Bowie's fans would enjoy but most others would ignore it. Harlow Star reviewer Roger Fulton felt that although fans of Bowie and rock music in general "will find these songs a little hard to swallow", as "their dramatic air is difficult to take", the EP nonetheless shows "how complete a performer Bowie is, and how good an interpretive singer", describing the release as unusual but "by no means inaccessible." New Musical Express writer Biba Kopf (Chris Bohn) said "Baal has no Kurt Weill tune to disguise its vibrant dirtiness or whiff of Weimar decadence to perfume its filthy smells." Comparing Bowie to two singers who also had hits with Brecht material, Bobby Darin and the Doors' Jim Morrison, Kopf felt that Bowie was the unlikeliest interpreter "and therefore the one [Brecht would] probably love best." In another piece, Bohn said the "excellent" EP showed Bowie "having a ball whooping through a young Brecht at his lebenslustful best."

Retrospectively, Dave Thompson of AllMusic describes Baal as "an uncompromising collection, considerably truer to Brecht than many outsiders expected, with its closest relatives within Bowie's own catalog being his occasional assaults on the Jacques Brel songbook", such as "Amsterdam" (1973). Thompson still considered this comparison flawed, as "Baal served up a side of Bowie that he had often claimed existed, but which even his closest friends had seldom seen." Willett, as a Brecht historian, considered the EP to be superior to the television play, writing that RCA presented the release "exceptionally well" and that it showcased Bowie "as one of the most gripping Brecht singers of all time, sounding even more committed to the material than in the play, and helped now by Muldowney's very clever and compelling arrangements." Buckley describes the soundtrack EP as "a bravura performance" and describes "Baal's Hymn" as the undoubted highlight, deeming Bowie's dynamic, dramatic vocal on the song to be "possibly the best of his career." Chris O'Leary calls the EP "a kiss-off to a label Bowie had grown to hate" and writes that "Baal is often considered a strange cul-de-sac in Bowie's career... But Baal, after Scary Monsters, is Bowie's best record of the decade [1980s]."

== Subsequent releases ==
"The Drowned Girl" was featured on the 2005 triple CD set The Platinum Collection and then the 2007 re-release of its third CD under the title The Best of David Bowie 1980/1987; the latter also included a music video for the song on DVD. "The Drowned Girl" and "Baal's Hymn" are both included on the 2003 and 2014 expanded re-issues of Sound + Vision. The EP was re-released as a digital download in 2007. All five tracks were also included as part of the Re:Call 3 compilation disc, exclusive to the A New Career in a New Town (1977–1982) box set, released in September 2017.

== Track listing ==
All lyrics are written by Bertolt Brecht and translated by John Willett, except "Remembering Marie A." which is traditional, adapted by Brecht and translated by Willett.

Side A
No.	Title	Music	Length
1.	"Baal's Hymn" (Der Choral vom großen Baal)	uncredited, Dominic Muldowney	4:02
2.	"Remembering Marie A." (Erinnerung an die Marie A.)	traditional, adapt. Franz Servatius Bruinier, arr. Muldowney	2:07
Total length:			6:09

Side B
No.	Title	Music	Length
1.	"Ballad of the Adventurers" (Die Ballade von den Abenteurern)	Muldowney	2:01
2.	"The Drowned Girl" (Vom ertrunkenen Mädchen)	Kurt Weill, arr. Muldowney	2:26
3.	"The Dirty Song"	Ludwig Prestel, arr. Muldowney	0:38
Total length:			5:05

== Personnel ==
- David Bowie – vocals, guitar, production
- Tony Visconti – bass, production
- uncredited session musicians – other instruments
- Eduard Meyer – engineering

Design

- Andrew Christian – art direction
- Partridge Rushton – design and artwork
- John Timbers (Radio Times) – photography
- uncredited photographer – Bertolt Brecht portrait (from In Life, In Pictures, In Text)
- Frans Masereel – woodcut illustration (from The Radical Imagination)
