= Franz Servatius Bruinier =

- Born: 13 May 1905; Biebrich, Germany
- Died: 31 July 1928 (aged 23); Berlin, Germany
- Occupations: Pianist; Composer
- Parent(s): Jan Berend Hendrik Bruinier (1863-1935); Sophie Christiane Henriette Wagner

Franz Servatius Bruinier (13 May 1905 – 31 July 1928) was a pianist and composer. He was the first professional composer to collaborate with Bertolt Brecht. On account of his early death from tuberculosis, and because the results of his work went unpublished or were published only without attribution in respect of the musical score, his contribution went unrecognised by mainstream Brecht scholarship till the mid 1970s.

== Life ==
Franz Servatius Bruinier was born at Biebrich, across the river from Mainz. He and his twin sister, Julie Anne Elisabeth "Anneliese" Bruinier, were the youngest of their parents' six recorded children. Bruinier's father, Jan Berend Hendrik Bruinier (1863-1935), had been born in Amsterdam and came to Germany, having held a senior position with a Biebrich company since 1904 and then, in 1907, accepting appointment as Chief Executive Officer ("Geschaeftsführer") with a heavy engineering firm in Berlin-Steglitz. Despite being resident and "economically active" in Germany "from the age of nine", he remained Dutch. He applied for German citizenship in 1914 but without success, and seems never to have repeated the application. Probably his children also retained their inherited Dutch citizenships: that was certainly the case with Ansco Bruinier, Franz's elder brother. Franz Bruinier's mother, born Sophie Christiane Henriette Wagner, was from a Biebrich family. Both parents were music and theatre enthusiasts.

Franz attended the prestigious Paulsen-Gymnasium (secondary school) in Steglitz until he was fifteen, while simultaneously receiving piano lessons at "Sandow's Music Academy". On 1 March 1923 he left the school "on account of poor [academic] performance" ("wegen schlechter Leistungen"). The school register recording pupil departures refers to the recommendation that he should study music. He now embarked on a period of study at the Berlin Music Academy: he was assigned to receive his piano lessons from Egon Petri who had been appointed to a position at the academy earlier that year.

Franz Bruinier was the youngest of four musical brothers. The second of them, August Heinrich Bruinier (1897-1970), was a violinist. Ansco Bruinier (1898-1972) was a 'cellist. The three of them began to perform at local events as a trio. A longer lasting team was the duo comprising just Franz and his violinist brother August Heinrich. A series of popular pieces were recorded for two record companies. Franz Bruinier also made a series of recordings with the flautist Fritz Kröckel. During 1924 and 1925 he worked as an accompanist for Jean Moreau, a favourite singer who performed "chanson-style" songs at Rudolf Nelson's "Black Cat" cabaret in the Friedrichstraße. By this time Bruinier himself was beginning to compose songs in the popular style of the times. He had two "shimmy" dances published in 1924, one "Russian ballade" and one setting of a poem by Nikolaus Lenau. Performed by Moreau and Bruinier, these were played on Berlin Radio. Bruinier's radio "appearances" as a piano accompanist and song arranger became increasingly frequent. He composed the music for Walter Mehring's radio play series, "Sahara" and worked extensively for various Berlin theatres. Examples of his work included the music for a fairy-tale presentation at the Lustspielhaus (theatre), and for the stage presentation "Liebeswirren im Alkoven" (loosely, "Turbulent love in the alcoves"), the fifth episode of the revue "From the rhythm of the times" ("Aus dem Rhythmus der Zeiten"), which was staged at Luise Werckmeister's "Summer-night theatre at the zoo".

It is established that before or during November 1925 Bruinier began working with Bertolt Brecht. They had probably met up through Berlin Radio. Manuscript notes dated November 1925 have been found in Brecht's extensive documentary archive that consist of three piano-music settings of poems by Brecht. All three settings are signed by Franz Bruinier, and one of the three also carries Brecht's signature. However, only one of the three song settings appeared subsequently as a published work: the "Alabama Song", but the version published in the "Hauspostille" compilation appeared without any reference to Franz Bruinier, the composer of the musical setting.

In the Autumn/Fall of 1926 the Ullstein editor Reinhard R. Braun founded a new cabaret series, the so-called "MA" (Montag-Abends / Monday evenings). Franz and his brother August were closely involved in the conception and implementation of the project. The other two Bruinier brothers, the singer Karl Bruinier and the instrumentalist Ansco Bruinier who is described in this context, as a jazz trumpeter, also performed regularly. The programmes were unusually diverse. They included pieces by contemporary composers (Igor Stravinsky, Paul Hindemith, Ernst Krenek) and readings from contemporary authors. There were scenes of melodrama, parodies of well-known theatre productions, revues written by members of the cabaret, and more. Franz Bruinier played an important role both as composer and as pianist. For instance, he wrote the music for "Paris Burns" ("Paris brennt"), a poem by Yvan Goll which the cabaret impresario Reinhard Braun had adapted to incorporate an "ecstatic scene with jazz", and which ended up incorporating a version of "The Great Gate of Kiev from Mussorgsky's popular suite, Pictures at an Exhibition. Brecht regularly attended the "MA" productions and also featured as an author in the programmes, for instance on 28 February 1927 with a song, written - probably especially for this show - jointly with Bruinier, entitled "Song vom Auto" (loosely, "Song on the automobile").

The manuscripts for Brecht's "Hauspostille" compilation include more song setting by Bruinier for Brecht lyrics/poems from 1927, notably for "Erinnerung an die Marie A" / "Reminiscence of Marie A.", "the Ballade of Hanna Cash" and "The Song of Surabaya-Johnny". Again, some of the manuscripts show Brecht and Brunier as jointly responsible for the settings, while on others it is just Bruinier's name that appears.

Bruinier spent the summer of 1927 in the Harz region where he served as music director for the festival at the open-air Bergtheater built into the hillside above Thale. One of his contributions involved writing stage music for Friedrich Hebbel's Nibelungen trilogy. On the recommendation of Tilla Durieux he applied successfully for the post of Kapellmeister (loosely, "musical director") with the Netherlands Operetta Society in The Hague. There he composed music for another revue. In March 1928 he also made a guest appearance in Amsterdam in the "MA" programme entitled "Mitropa", which featured many numbers by him, including "Paris Burns" ("Paris brennt") and three Brecht songs.

During his summer in the Harz region Bruinier fell ill with pleurisy. Doctors in The Hague then diagnosed pulmonary tuberculosis, and it was from this disease that on 31 July 1928 Franz Servatius Bruinier died.

== Work ==
Bruinier's compositions were of "made-to-measure music" for specific applications / events. That is likely to be one of the reasons that most of his output has disappeared. Major pieces such as the stage musicals and the score for "Paris Burns" ("Paris brennt") are lost. However, some revealing contemporary insights on "Paris Burns" do survive. It was the librettist himself, Yvan Goll, writing to Nino Frank, who commended the "mimicry" in the production staged by the "MA" cabaret, "with the musical accompaniment by a twenty year old composer in which the Marseillaise, French bugle calls, the Funeral march and modernist blues harmonies make my verses resonate even more aggressively than in Royal Palace", referring to a Kurt Weill opera which also featured lyrics by Goll, and which had its Paris premier just two days after the "MA" cabaret in Berlin premiered "Paris Burns". Evidently Bruinier used the French national anthem, generic horn signals, death marches and other traditional themes in his material, and distorted them using modern jazz and blues harmonies and rhythms. Goll was particularly struck by the rhythmic dimension: "A hall full of youngsters who were completely carried along by the rhythms". Kurt Pinthus was similarly enthusiastic in the review he wrote for the news magazine "8 Uhr Abendblatt", praising the "Jazz music which blends together the lyrics with rhythmic and lyrical clarity".

What survives, whether in print or as hand-written manuscripts, consists principally of individual songs and related minor arrangements. Basing himself on these surviving fragments, the musicologist Fritz Hennenberg sums up Bruinier as an accomplished composer whose greatest strengths were in respect of effective textual support and interpretation. Lyricists whose work he set to music included not just Brecht, but also Goll, Mehring, Klabund and Wedekind. Hennenberg highlights Bruinier's powers in respect of declamation, parody and punch lines, but he does not see Bruinier as a great original. "A personal voice is not much in evidence, which leaves you with a more or less skilful montage of musical cliches" ("Ein eigener Ton bleibt meist aus, und es kommt nur zur mehr oder weniger geschickten Montage von Klischees").

Bruinier himself published an essay in the "Rundfunk-Rundschau" magazine in 1927 in connection with his music for the radio play "Sahara". Under the title "The musical illustration for a radio play" ("Die musikalische Hörspiel-Illustration") he sought to encourage expansion of "music illustrating texts" as background music ("Geräuschmusik") and wrote of the importance of the "finesses of microphonoes" ("Finessen des Mikrophons").

Bruinier's work with Brecht was completely forgotten for decades: Brecht never mentioned it in his "Hauspostille" compilation or anywhere else. That began to change only in 1973, when the fourth volume of the inventory of Brecht's literary estate was published. It included Bruinier signatures on a succession of Brecht songs from 1925 and 1927, which Brecht had kept hold of. The collaboration seems to have resulted, in the first instance, from Brecht being required to complete melodies for his "Hauspostille" to which his own "notation skills" were unequal. From the state of the manuscripts in question it is clear that Bruinier's contributions ranged from simply writing out melodies that Brecht himself had produced to coming up with his own independent compositions. The music for "Alabama Song" was clearly one of the Bruinier originals. The subsequent setting of the same song produced by Kurt Weill for "Rise and Fall of the City of Mahagonny" ("Aufstieg und Fall der Stadt Mahagonny") certainly owes the basics of its rhythmic dynamic to the Bruinier original as well as some of the elements in the tune.
