= Ansco Bruinier =

German musician

Julius Ansco Bruinier
- Born: November 7, 1898; Frankfurt, Germany
- Died: February 2, 1972 (aged 73); Bernried am Starnberger See, Bavaria, West Germany
- Citizenship: Dutch
- Occupations: Cabaret musician (instrumental and by whistling); Oil company executive
- Children: Katharina Döbner-Bruinier

Julius Ansco Bruinier (7 November 1898 – 6 February 1972) was a German musician in the Berlin Jazz / Dance music band, known as the Weintraub's Syncopators. During the 1920s he played the trumpet in the band, but the only instrument in which he had received formal training was the 'cello, and on occasion he played fluently any one of a range of other instruments. He was an engineer by profession.

== Life ==
Bruinier was the third son of Jan Berend Hendrik Bruinier (1863 - 1934) and Sophie Bruinier (born Sophie Wagner, 1867). Despite being born in Frankfurt he inherited Dutch citizenship from his father. He attended junior and middle school in the Steglitz quarter of Berlin after which he worked for more than a year, in 1916/1917, as a machine technician at the Dingler Works in Zweibrücken. After this he returned to complete his secondary schooling at Steglitz, passing his School final exams (Abitur) in 1920, and then moving across the border to Hengelo where for eight months he worked as a technical draftsman at a machinery factory. Following that, till April 1922 he undertook his military service in the Netherlands. In May 1922 he returned to Berlin where he enrolled to study Technical Chemistry at the Technical University. He was still a chemistry student when he first performed with the Stefan Weintraub danceband in 1924.

As a child Bruinier received 'cello lessons, and from 1922 he was making public appearances in a trio with his two brothers, August and Franz. From 1 August 1926 he belonged to one of Germany's best known jazz bands of the time, Weintraub's Syncopators. There he played the trumpet, sousaphone, tuba, 'cello and double bass. Along with his instrumental contributions he demonstrated a rare talent for performance-grade whistling ("Kunstpfeiffen"). He also participated with the Weintraubs Syncopators in the "Monday Evening" (Montagabend / MA) cabaret/review series, for which his younger brother. Franz, wrote most of the music. Other reviews in which they took part during the later 1920s were "Was Sie wollen" ("What you want") by Marcellus Schiffer and "Das bist Du" ("That's you"), with music by Friedrich Hollaender. In 1928 Ansco Bruinier was part of a Weintraub's Syncopators tour of Germany which included a show with Kate Kühl at the Großer Feldberg "Feldberghaus" venue. Proceeds from Bruinier's musical activities now helped him to finance his further education.

In September 1928 Bruinier temporarily left the band in order to complete his studies, emerging a year later with an engineering degree. Despite the degree, however, as a foreign national during the unemployment surge that accompanied the Great Depression he was unable to find employment as an engineer, and he rejoined Weintraub's Syncopators at the end of 1929. In September 1930 he finally found a permanent job, working for Shell Oil. During the next few years he worked for the company round the world, with lengthy stints in Romania, Borneo and Argentina. After 1936 he was based mostly at the company's vast facility at Hamburg. He remained with Shell till his retirement, when he relocated to Bernried on Lake Starnberg, south of Munich.

== Musical legacy ==
Bruinier features in a number of gramophone recordings produced by Weintraub's Syncopators, both as a trumpeter in "Up and at 'em" and "Jackass Blues", and with a whistling solo in "Marion-Tango" recorded for Odeon on 15 February 1928. Bruinier's biographer, Horst Bergmeier, writes that his remarkable whistling performances always attracted prominent reporting in the press. He later taught his whistling skills to his daughter, Katharina Döbner-Bruinier, which was demonstrated by her in 2010 in a film about Weintraub's Syncopators.

Buinier can also be heard in several films for which music from Weintraub's Syncopators features in the sound tracks, notably The Blue Angel and Das Kabinett des Dr. Larifari ("The Cabinet of Dr. Larifari"). No recordings survive of the "ecstatic scene with jazz" (using music by Franz Bruinier) from the Yvan Goll "Paris brennt" ("Paris Burns") which was premiered at a "Montagabend" review in Berlin on 28 February 1928, although the programme indicates that Ansco Bruinier was one of the performers taking part.
