= Claire Goll =

German-French writer and journalist

- Born: Klara Liliane Aischmann; 29 October 1890; Nuremberg, Germany
- Died: 30 May 1977 (aged 86); Paris, France
- Occupation: Writer
- Spouses: Heinrich Studer (m. 1911; div. 1917) Yvan Goll (m. 1921; died 1950)

Claire Goll (born Klara Liliane Aischmann) (29 October 1890 – 30 May 1977) was a German-French writer and journalist; she married the poet Yvan Goll in 1921.

== Biography ==
Goll née Aischmann was born on 29 October 1890 in Nuremberg, Germany. She grew up in Munich.

In 1911, Goll married the publisher Heinrich Studer (1889–1961) and lived with him in Leipzig. In May 1912, she gave birth to their daughter Dorothea Elisabeth, her only child. In 1916, she emigrated in protest of World War I to Switzerland, where she studied at the University of Geneva, became involved in the peace movement, and began to work as a journalist. In 1917, she and Studer divorced, and she met the poet Yvan Goll, to whom she became engaged. At the end 1918, she had an affair with Rainer Maria Rilke and they remained friends until his death. In 1918, she debuted as a writer with the poetry collection Mitwelt and the novella collection Die Frauen erwachen. In 1919, she travelled with Goll to Paris, where they married in 1921. Her short stories, poems, and novels also appeared in French. She wrote her poetry collections Poèmes d'amour (1925), Poèmes de la jalousie (1926) and Poèmes de la vie et de la mort together with her husband as a "shared song of love" ("Wechselgesang der Liebe").

The pair, both of Jewish origin, fled from Europe to New York in 1939, but returned in 1947. Yvan died in 1950. From then on, Goll dedicated her work to her husband. Her autobiographical novels Der gestohlene Himmel (1962) and Traumtänzerin (1971) did not receive much attention. However, her battle with Paul Celan over copyright and plagiarism, known as the "Goll Affair", caused a significant stir.

Goll died on 30 May 1977 in Paris, France.
