= Château du Haut-Ribeaupierre =

Castle in Haut-Rhin, Grand Est, France

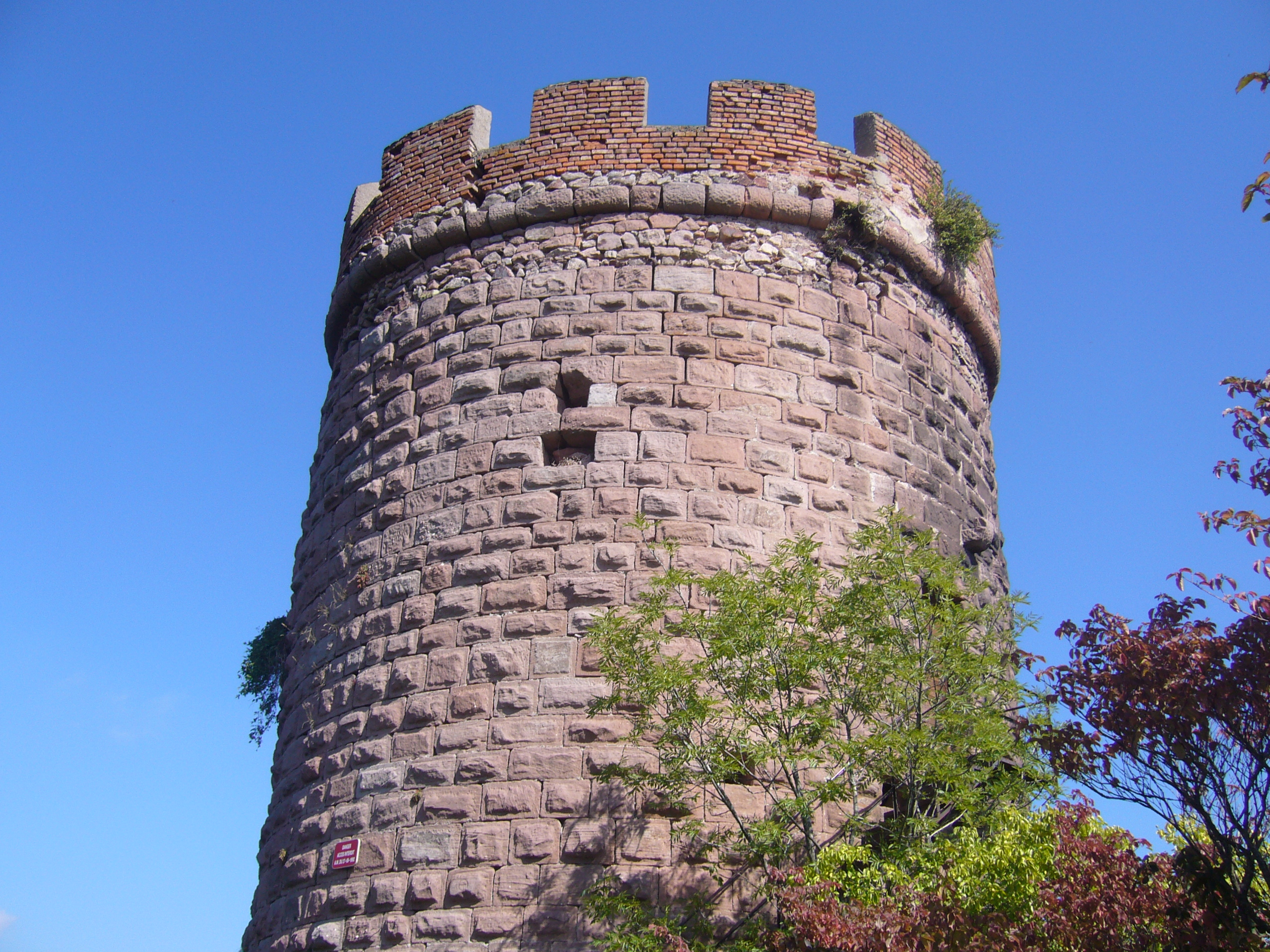
- Circular keep of Haut-Ribeaupierre

- Location within France
- 48°12′23″N 7°18′20″E

History
- Built: 11th century
- Original use: Castle

Site notes
- Architectural style: Medieval
- Current use: Museum

Monument historique
- Designated: 1841 & 1930

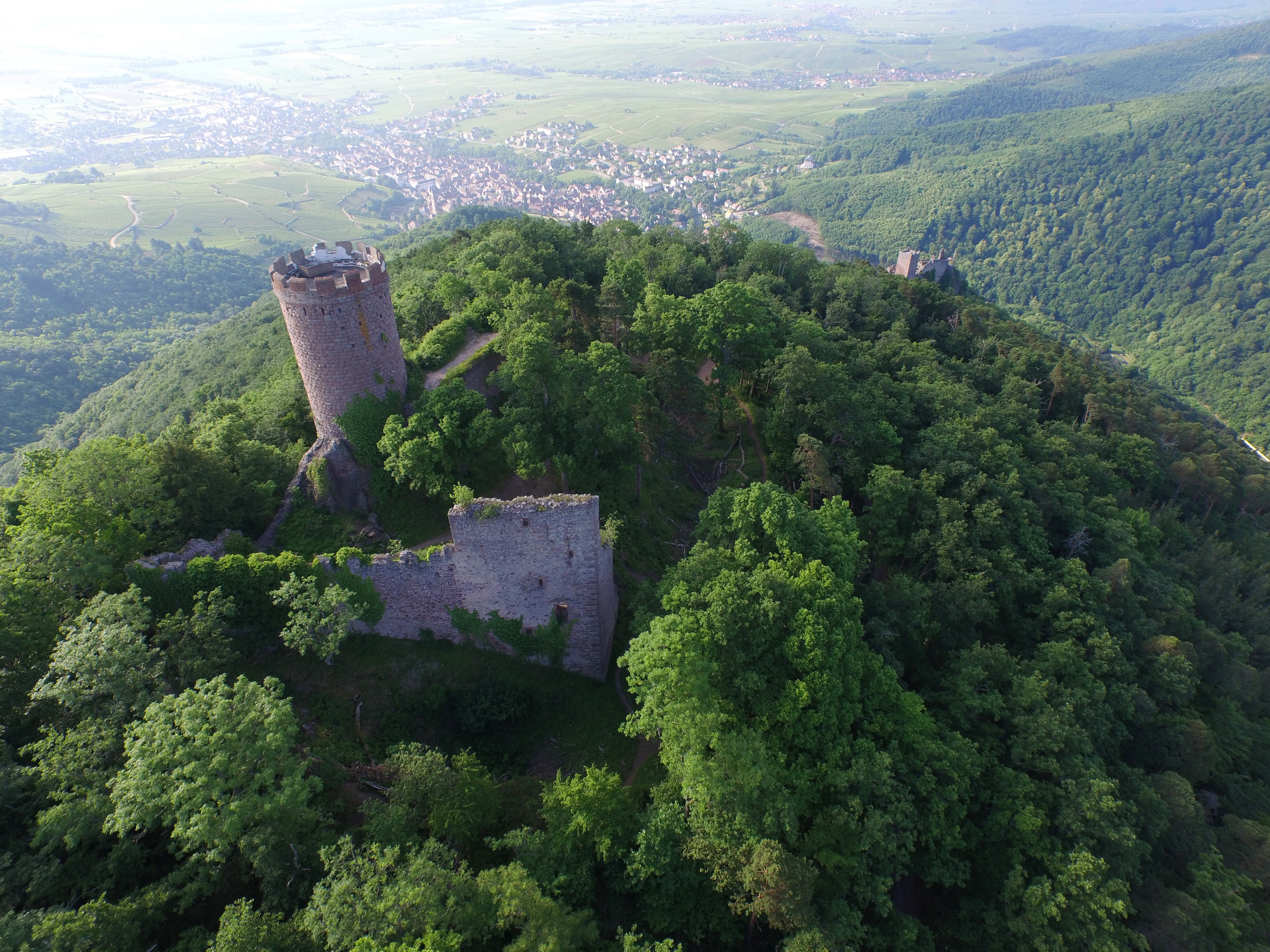
Aerial view

The Château du Haut-Ribeaupierre (German: Hohrappolstein or Burg Hohrappoltstein) is one of three castles (with the Château de Saint-Ulrich and the Château du Girsberg) which overlook the commune of Ribeauvillé in the Haut-Rhin département of France. Situated at an altitude of 642 m, it overlooks the other two castles.

== History ==
Château du Haut-Ribeaupierre is the oldest of the Ribeaupierre's castles, its existence being known from 1084. It was constructed on an ancient Roman site. Then known as the "Altenkastel", it was Anselme de Ribeaupierre who took possession of the castle in 1288. Around 1368, Brunon de Ribeaupierre became owner. Dedicated to a ferocious hatred for the English, he imprisoned Sir John Harleston, who had an imperial safe conduct, in the keep from 1384 to 1387. He was only freed with the payment of a large ransom and after pressure from the Holy Roman Empire. At the end of the 13th century, the castle became a residence of the Ribeaupierres. Another noted prisoner was held in the keep in 1477. Philippe de Croy, Count of Chimay, ally of Charles the Bold, was captured by a Ribeaupierre at Nancy.

Most of the castle today is completely ruined and surrounded by dense vegetation.

It has been listed since 1841 as a monument historique by the French Ministry of Culture.

== See also ==
- List of castles in France

== Bibliography ==
- Braun, Jean : Circuit des châteaux forts d'Alsace - Ingersheim : éd. SAEP, 1978 - collection Delta 2000.
- Carmona, Christophe & Trendel, Guy : Les Châteaux autour de Ribeauvillé et Ricquewihr - Sarreguemines : éd. Pierron, 2001 - collection Les Châteaux des Vosges : histoire, architecture, légendes n°7.
