= Château de Saint-Ulrich =

Castle in the French department of Haut-Rhin

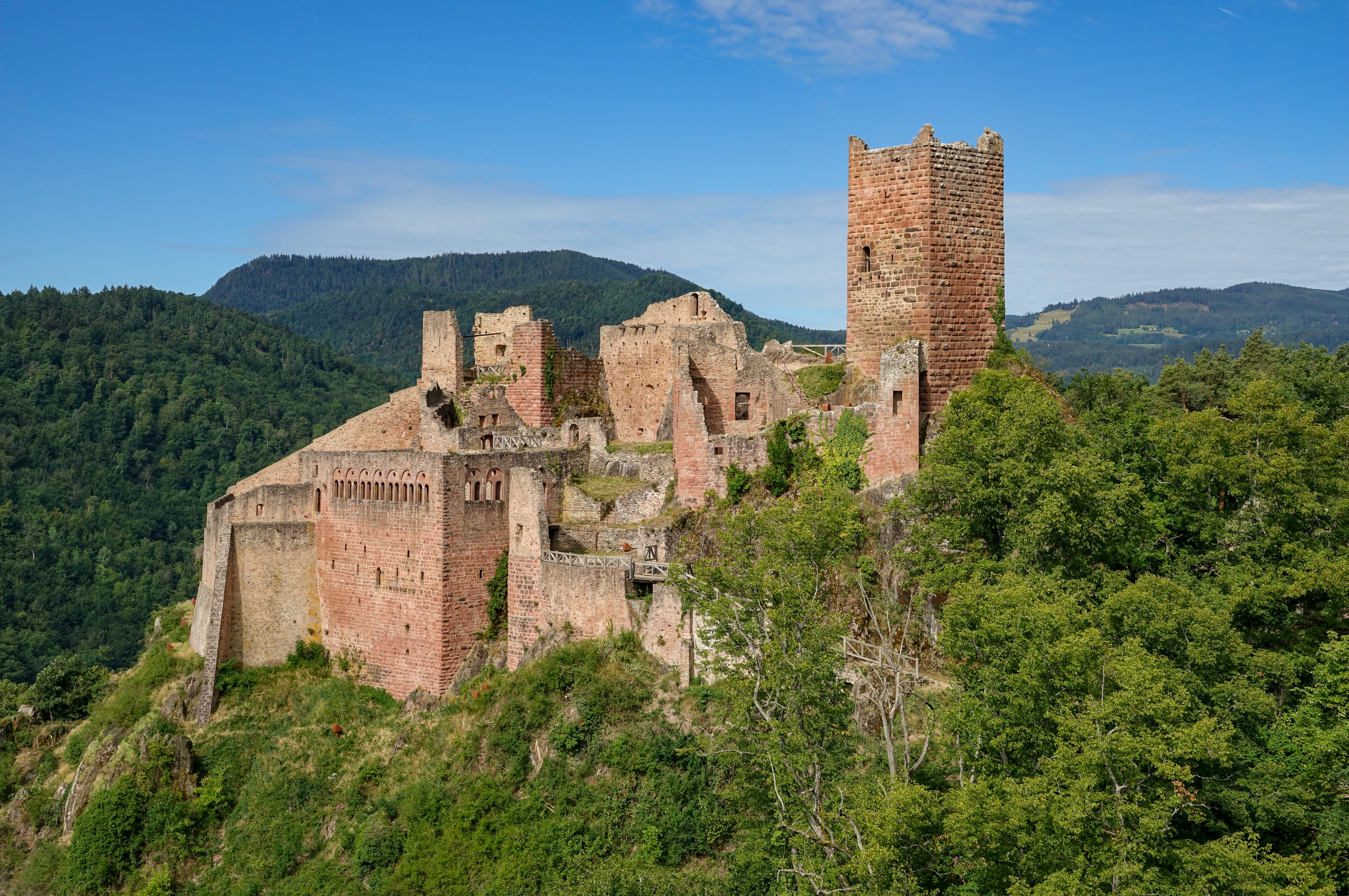
- Château de Saint-Ulrich seen from the neighbouring Château du Girsberg

- Location within France
- 48°12′10″N 7°18′19″E

History
- Built: 11th century
- Original use: Castle

Site notes
- Architectural style: Medieval

Monument historique
- Designated: 1841, 1930

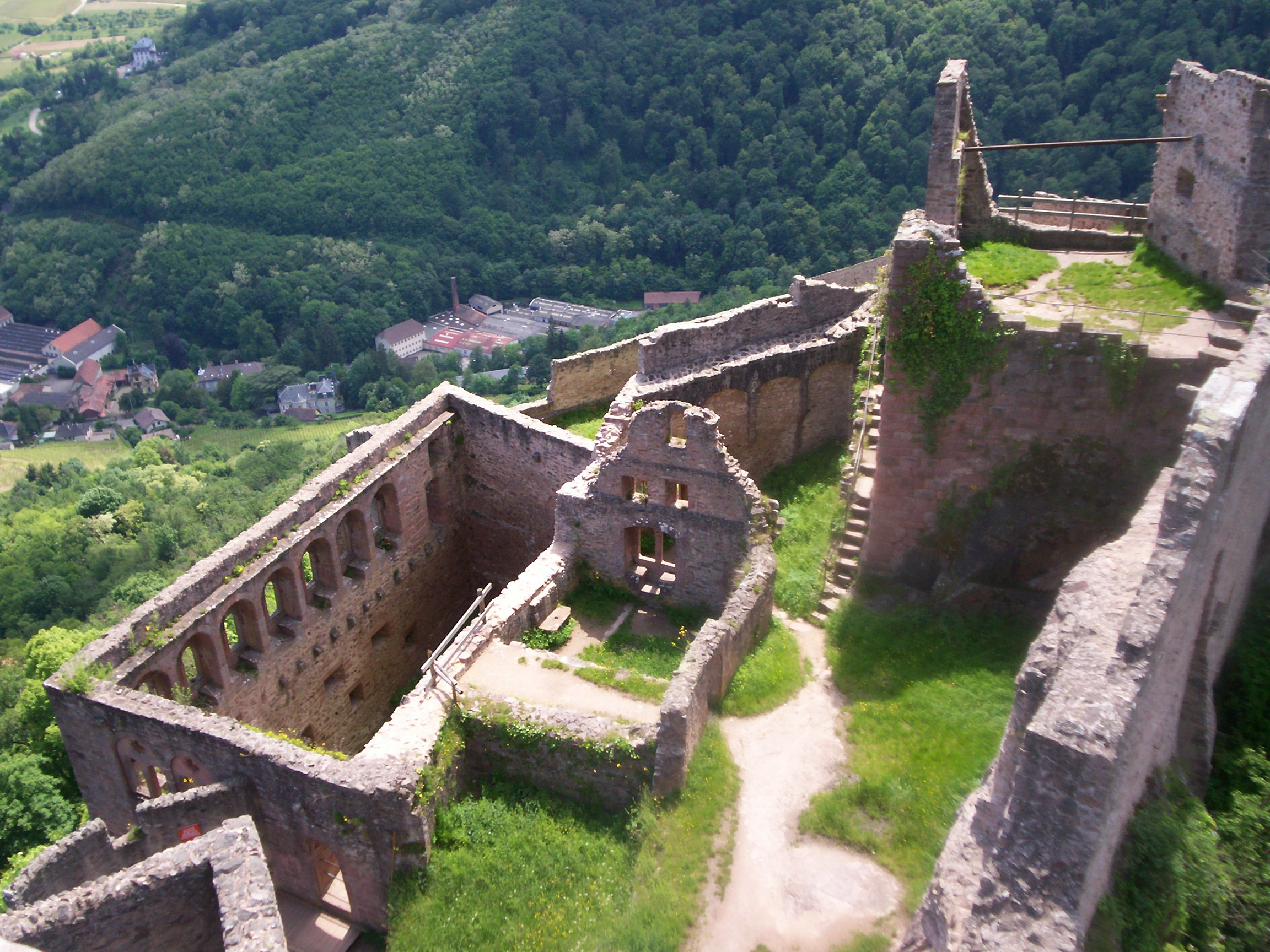
Overall view from the keep

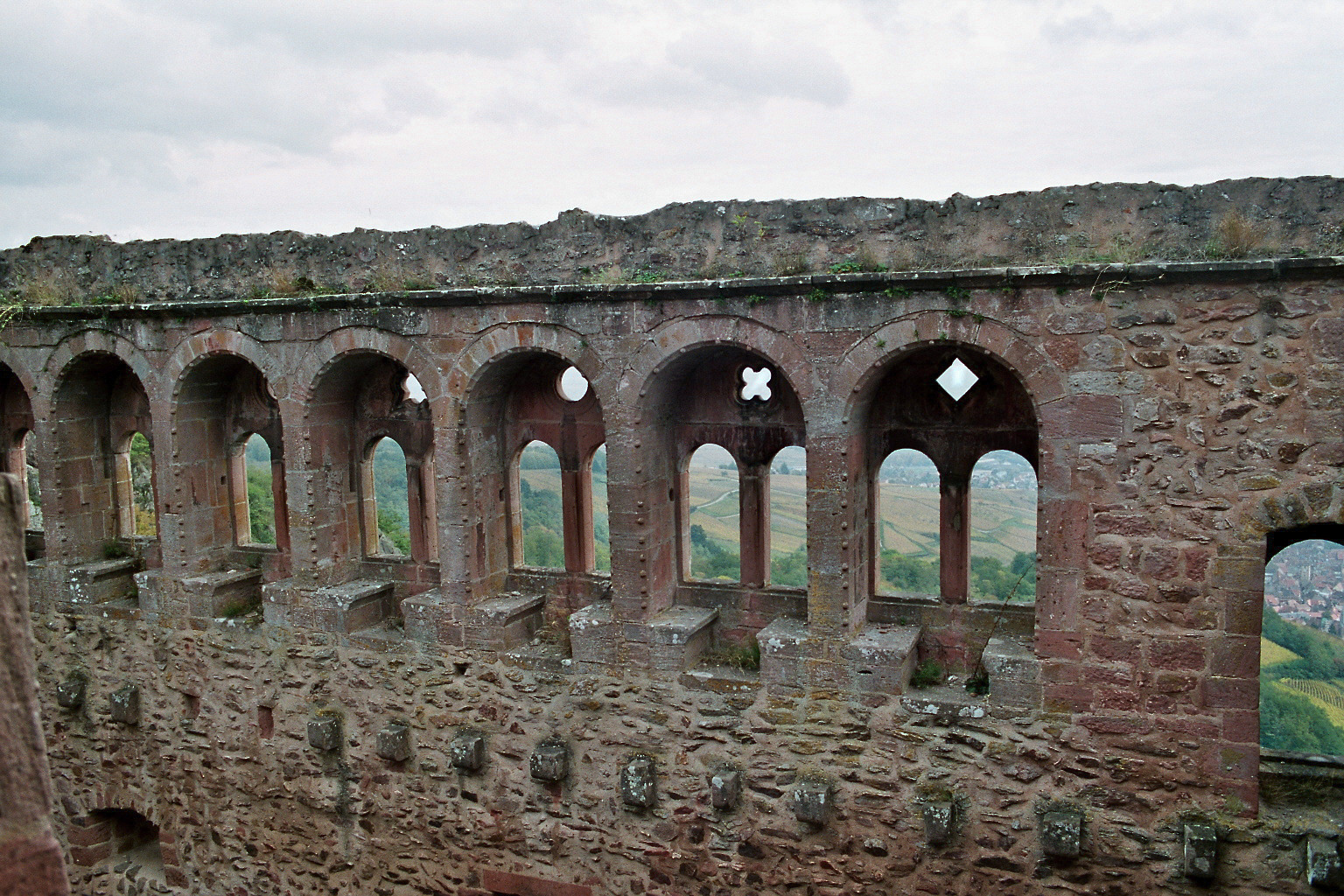
Salle des chevaliers

The Château de Saint-Ulrich (also known as Château de Grand-Ribeaupierre or Ulrichsburg) is one of three castles (with the Girsberg and the Haut-Ribeaupierre) which overlooks the commune of Ribeauvillé in the Haut-Rhin département of France. It is situated at an altitude of 528 m.

The present name of the site is from the chapel dedicated to Saint Ulrich of Augsburg which is found in the castle. Medieval texts never gave the present name - the castle had the name of the Rappolstein dynasty (or Ribeaupierre in the French style).

== History ==
From the 11th to the 16th centuries, the castle was the principal residence of the powerful lords of Ribeaupierre. There must have been another castle on the same site which belonged in 1114 to the Bishop of Basel. It was occupied militarily by Henry V, Holy Roman Emperor, who used it as a strongpoint in his war against the Eguisheims. It was then returned to the Bishop of Basel who restored it to the Ribeaupierres. Anselme II de Ribeaupierre, who chased the other members of the family from the castle, successfully survived two sieges, in 1287 by Rudolph I of Germany and, in 1293, his successor Adolf. A celebrated criminal, Dame Cunégonde d'Hungersheim, was incarcerated in the keep and tried to escape with the aid of a guard.

The castle is a very fine example of the military architecture of Alsace in the Middle Ages, including a keep erected in the 12th century and a residence with chimney of the 12th century. In the 13th century, the salle des chevaliers (knights' hall) was decorated with nine beautiful windows in the Romanesque style which can still be seen. In the same period (1435), the chapel dedicated to Saint Ulrich, Bishop of Augsburg, was built.

The Ribeaupierre family left this castle in the 16th century for a Renaissance-style mansion (the present school in Ribeauvillé). The castle was dismantled during the Thirty Years' War.

== The castle today ==
The visible remains date from several epochs:

- 12th century : Square keep and the corps de logis
- 13th century : Salle des chevaliers, and the residential tower
- 14th century : Barbican and outer enceinte
- 15th century: Chapel (Saint-Ulrich)

The Château de Saint-Ulrich has been listed since 1841 as a monument historique by the French Ministry of Culture.

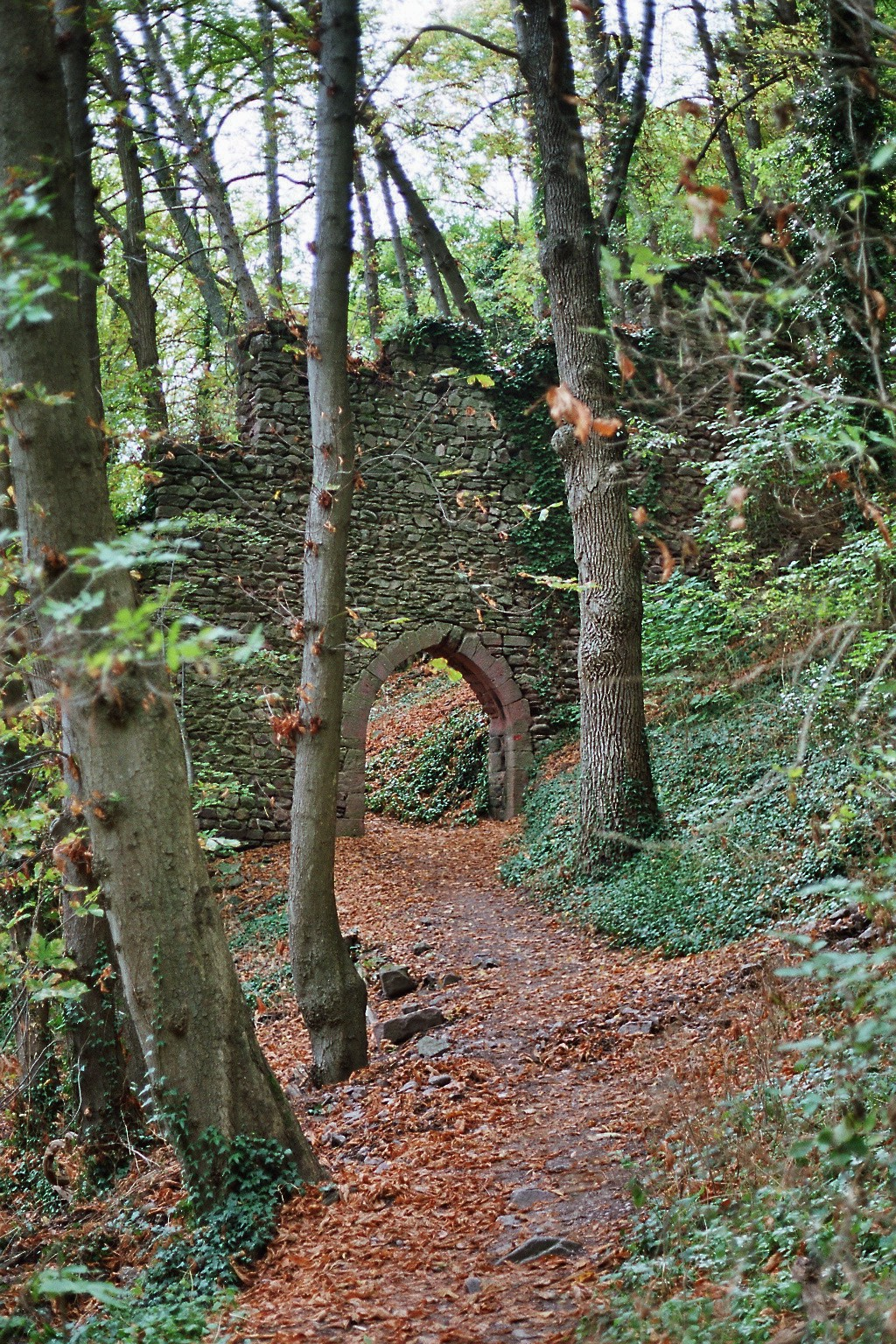
Entry to the outer enceinte

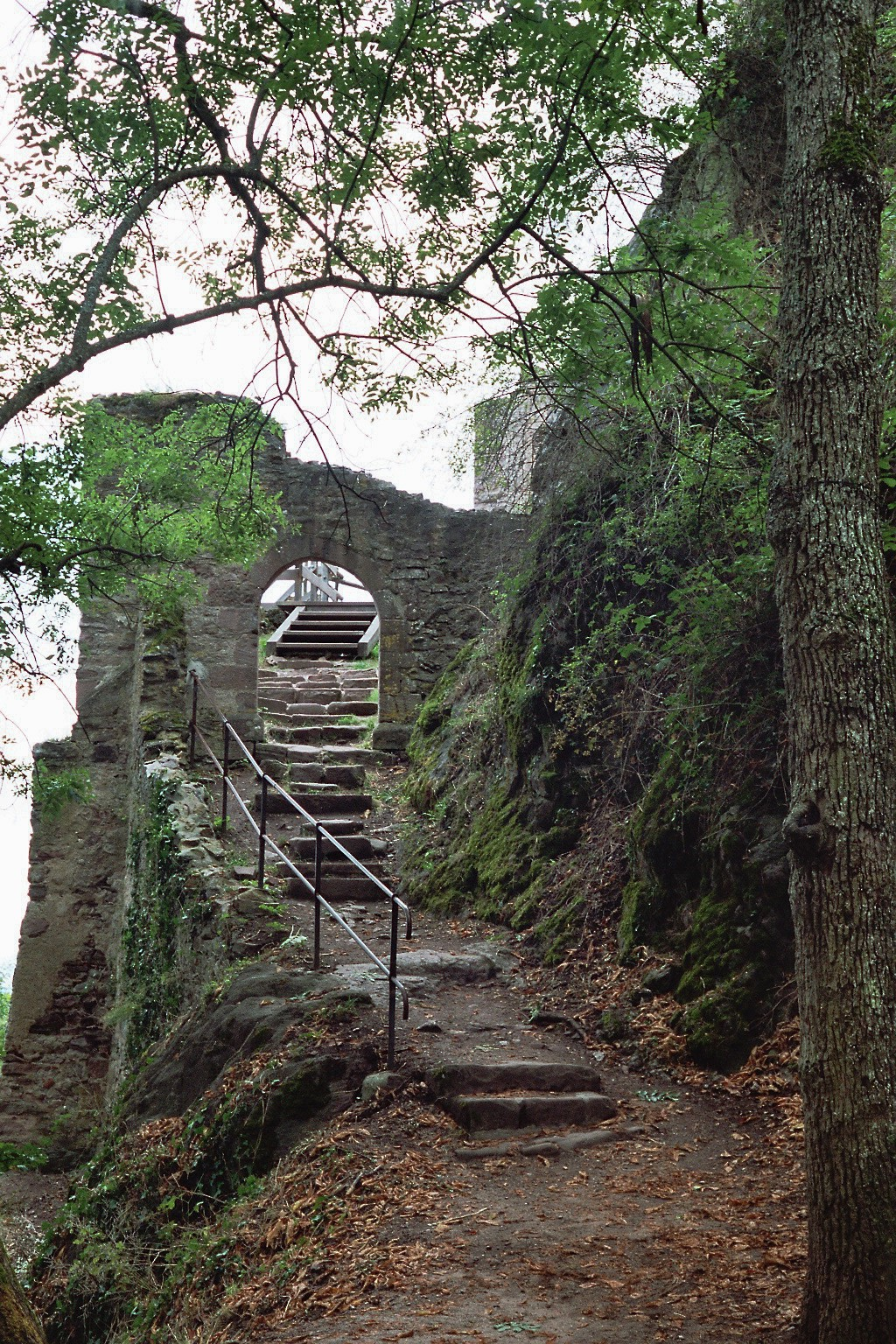
Castle entrance

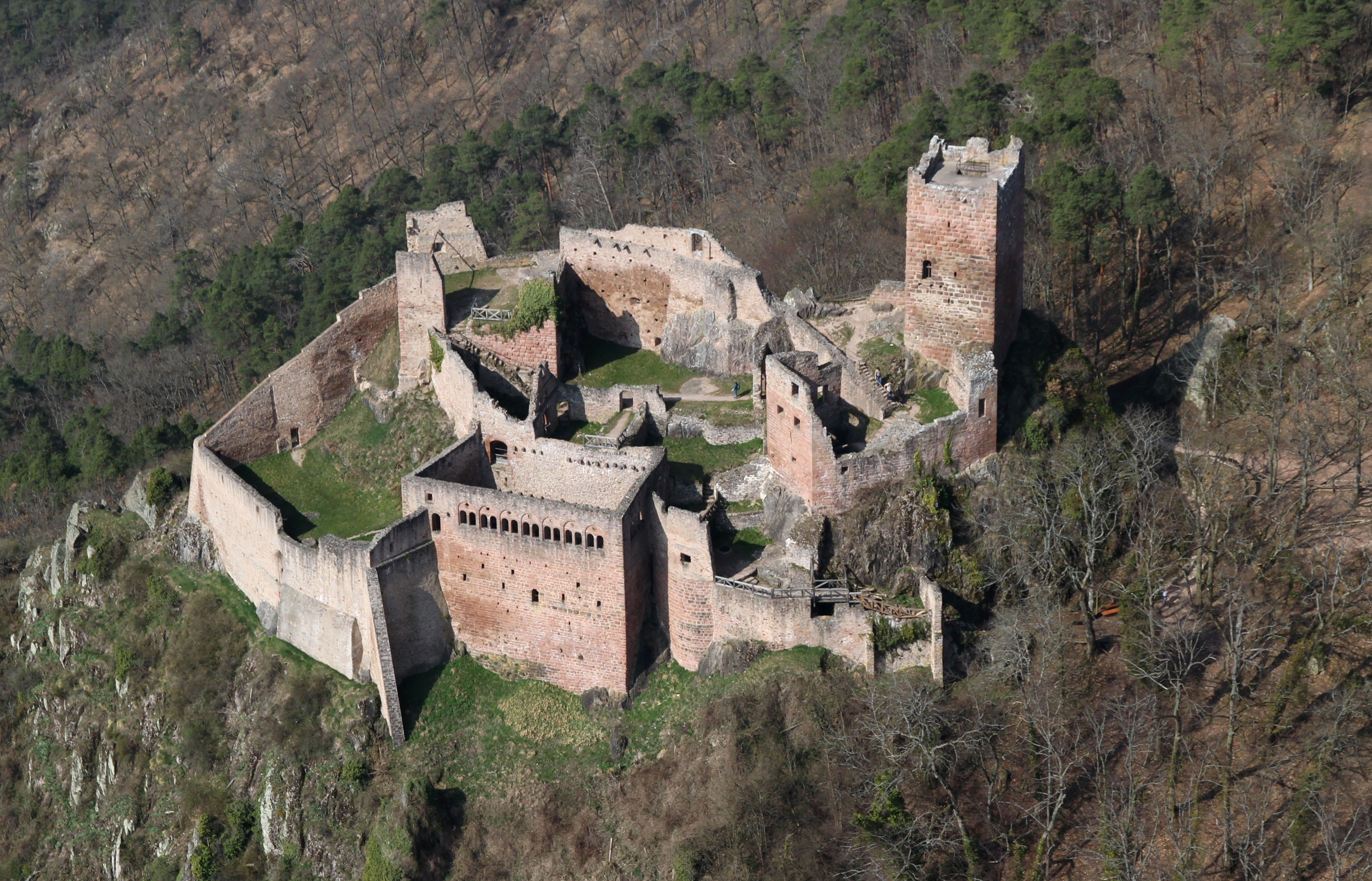
Aerial view

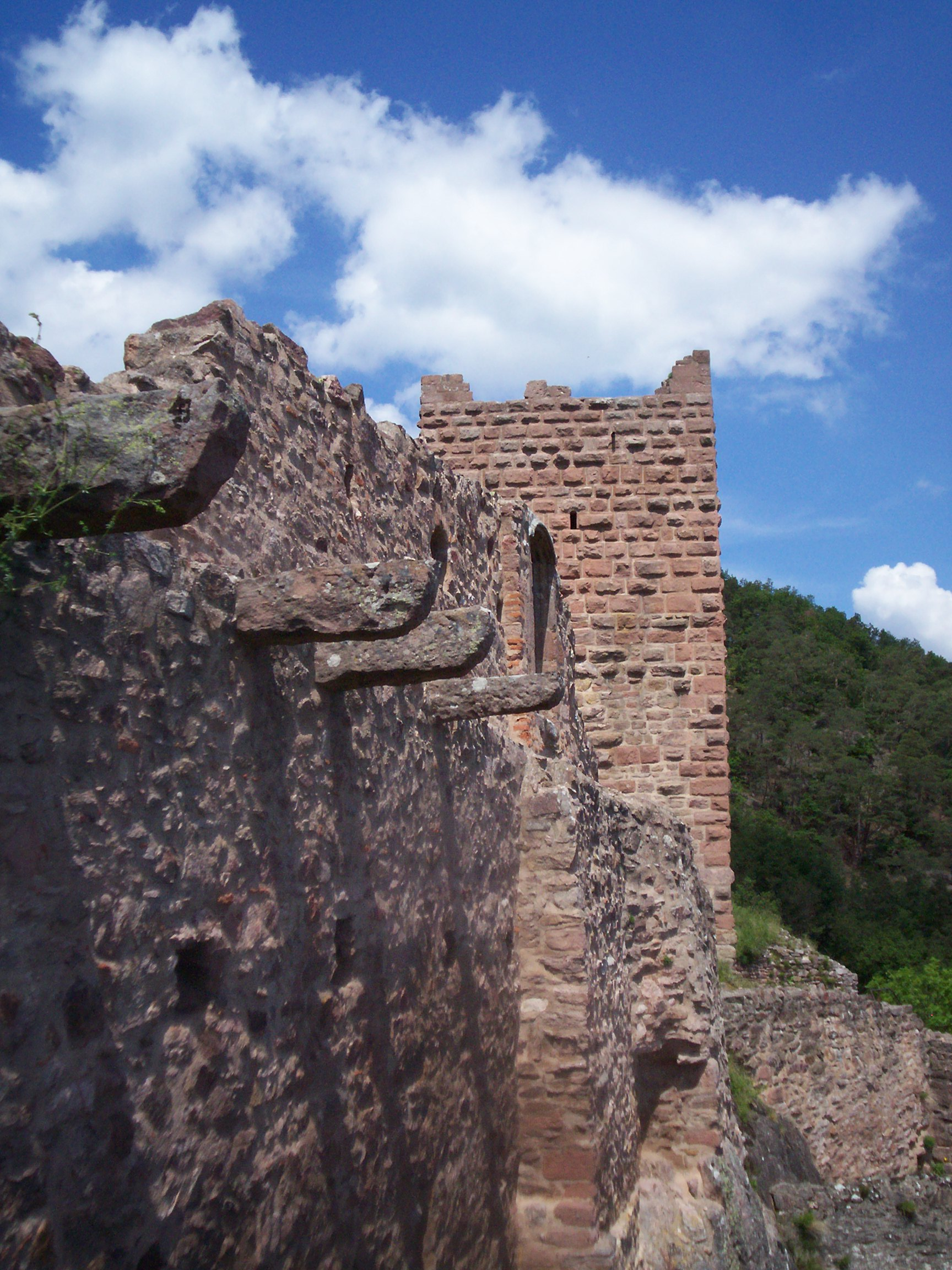

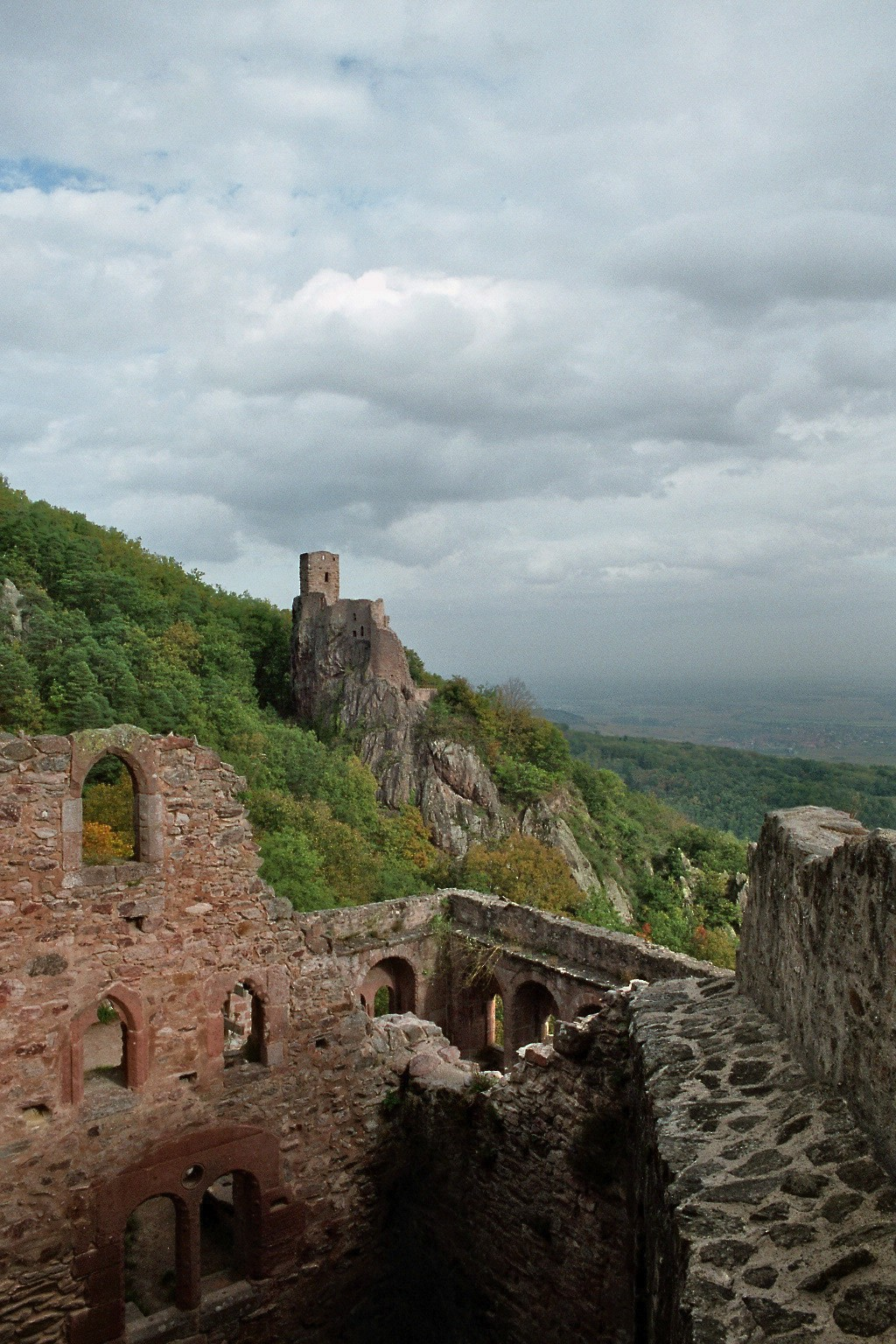
Château de Saint-Ulrich with Château du Girsberg in the background

== The legend of the mortal arrow ==
Two Ribeaupierre brothers, one living in the château de Saint-Ulrich, the other in Girsberg, had agreed to go hunting the next day. They had arranged a signal: the first to wake would fire an arrow at the other's shutters. The Saint-Ulrich brother awoke first and shot an arrow towards his brother's shutters. But the latter, at the moment the arrow arrived, opened his shutters. He died, his heart pierced.

== See also ==
- List of castles in France

== Bibliography ==
- Braun, Jean, Circuit des châteaux forts d'Alsace - Ingersheim : éd. SAEP, 1978 - collection Delta 2000.
- Carmona Christophe & Trendel, Guy, Les Châteaux autour de Ribeauvillé et Ricquewihr - Sarreguemines, éd. Pierron, 2001 - collection Les Châteaux des Vosges : histoire, architecture, légendes n°7.
- Mengus, Nicolas, Au temps des châteaux forts en Alsace - Strasbourg, éd. Coprur, 2004.
- Salch, Charles-Laurent, Nouveau dictionnaire des châteaux Forts d'Alsace, Alsatia, 1991.
