= August Heinrich Bruinier =

German violinist and violin teacher

- Born: 7 May 1897; Zweibrücken, "Bavaria this side of the Rhine", Germany
- Died: 24 April 1970 (aged 72); Munich, Bavaria, West Germany
- Occupations: Violinist and violin teacher
- Spouse: Hertha Steinborn
- Parent(s): Jan Berend Hendrik Bruinier (1863–1934); Sophie Christiane Henriette Wagner/Bruinier (1867-)

August Heinrich Bruinier (7 May 1897 – 24 April 1970) was a German violinist and violin teacher. He was born into a musical family of Dutch provenance.

== Life ==
August Heinrich Bruinier was born in Zweibrücken, close to the French frontier. His father, Jan Berend Hendrik Bruinier (1863–1934) had been born in Amsterdam, but lived in Germany where he worked as the chief executive officer (Geschäftsführer) of a manufacturing company in the heavy industrial sector. (Note: "Deutscher Arbeit Verband Deutscher Dampfkessel- u. Apparate-Bauanstalten") His mother, born Sophie Christiane Henriette Wagner, came from a German family. The family was an unusually musical one: of the parents' six recorded children, three grew up to become professional musicians.

Between 1904 and 1907 he attended the "Realgymnasium" (secondary school) in Biebrich, near Wiesbaden before moving to the rapidly expanding Berlin conurbation where from 1907 till 1913 he attended an "Oberrealschule" (senior secondary school) in Steglitz.

Bruinier started his formal musical training as a pupil of the violinist Adalbert Gülzow between 1912 and 1914. He studied at the Berlin Music Academy from 1914 till 1917, and was then able to get away from the war playing as a member of the Amsterdam Concertgebouw Orchestra between 1917 and 1918. Between 1918 and 1920 he progressed his studies at the Berlin Music Academy, now studying with Karl Klingler. He continued to take lessons privately in 1920/1921 with Willy Hess and Gabriele Wietrowetz (1866–1937).

He was Concert Master with the Berlin Academic Orchestra ("Akademische Orchester Berlin") from 1923 till 1925, and was also at this stage already giving violin lessons. In the "Society for Modern Musical presentation in Berlin" (Note: "Gesellschaft für moderne Musikaufführungen in Berlin"), which Othmar Steinbauer and Max Deutsch had created (based on the example of Schoenberg's Society for Private Musical Performances in Vienna (Note: "Verein für musikalische Privataufführungen")), Bruinier was the leader of the "House quartet". He was also a member, with Bruno Henze, of the "Old German Chamber Quartet" ("Altdeutsche Kammerquartett").

Between 1928 and 1937 Bruinier worked as concert master for the Tobis Film company: from 1937 he was employed in the same position at Berlin's Nollendorf Square Theatre (as it was then known). Between 1943 and 1963 he taught the violin at the Braunschweig District Music Academy. Along with this, between 1951 and 1961 he held summer chamber music courses in the hills south of Würzburg, for JMI at Schloss Weikersheim.

== Chamber music ensembles ==
- Brothers Bruiner: August Heinrich Bruinier performed as a duo together with his brother, pianist Franz Servatius Bruinier.
- Bruinier-Trio: August Heinrich Bruinier performing a piano trio together with his brothers Franz und Julius Ansco Bruinier at the Vox broadcasting house at Potsdamer Strasse in Berlin.
- Bruinier-Quartett: in 1922 Bruinier formed the Bruinier-Quartett. Members were, apart from him playing the 1st violin, Marg. Schmidt-Laipa and later Fritz Wehmeyer (1906–1973) (2nd violin), from 1927 to 1937 Karla Höcker, followed by Karl Reitz (viola) and Hans Chemin-Petit, Paul Blumenfeld (1901–2001) (1929 bis 1932) and Karl Dechert (1900-1962) (cello). Due to World War II and Reitz' sudden death in 1943 the quartett was dissolved in 1944.
