= Château du Girsberg =

Castle in the Haut-Rhin département of France

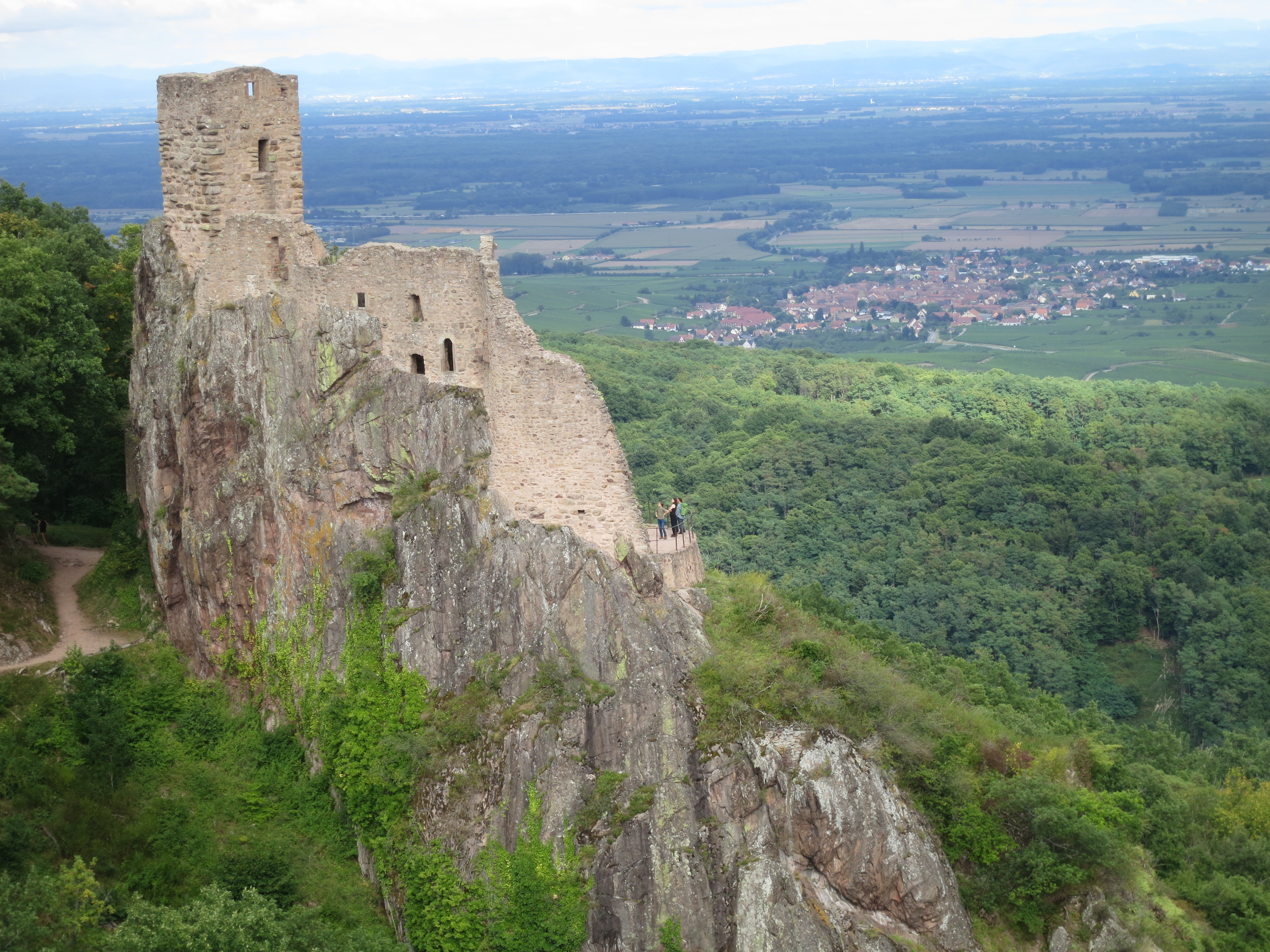
- The Château du Girsberg

- Location within France
- 48°12′13″N 7°18′26″E

History
- Built: 13th century
- Original use: Castle

Site notes
- Architectural style: Medieval
- Current use: Ruins

Monument historique
- Designated: 1841 & 1930

The Château du Girsberg (also Guirsberg, formerly named Petit-Ribeaupierre) is one of three castles (with the Château de Saint-Ulrich and the Haut-Ribeaupierre) which overlook the commune of Ribeauvillé in the Haut-Rhin département of France. It stands at an altitude of 528 m.

The Lords of Ribeaupierre built the castle, then named Stein (La Roche), in the 13th century. They rebuilt it after a fire caused by lightning in 1288. In 1304, they gave it to their vassals, the knights of Guirsberg, from whom the castle took its name. The Guirsbergs kept it until they died out in the 15th century. It was abandoned in the 17th century.

The remains currently visible date from several epochs:

- 13th century : pentagonal keep
- 14th century : inner court
- 15th century : corps de logis

It has been listed since 1841 as a monument historique by the French Ministry of Culture.

== Gallery ==
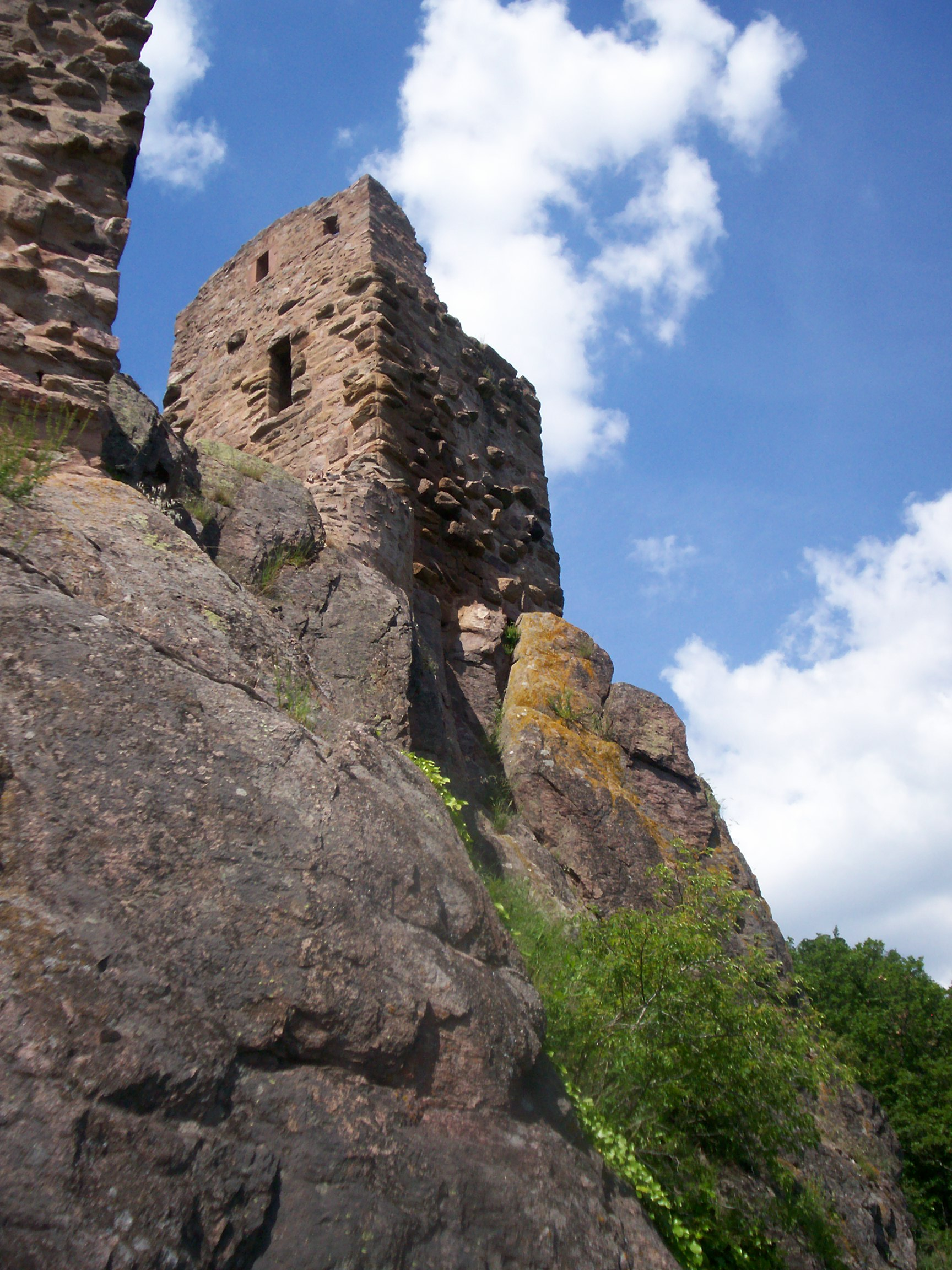
Chateau du Girsberg structure

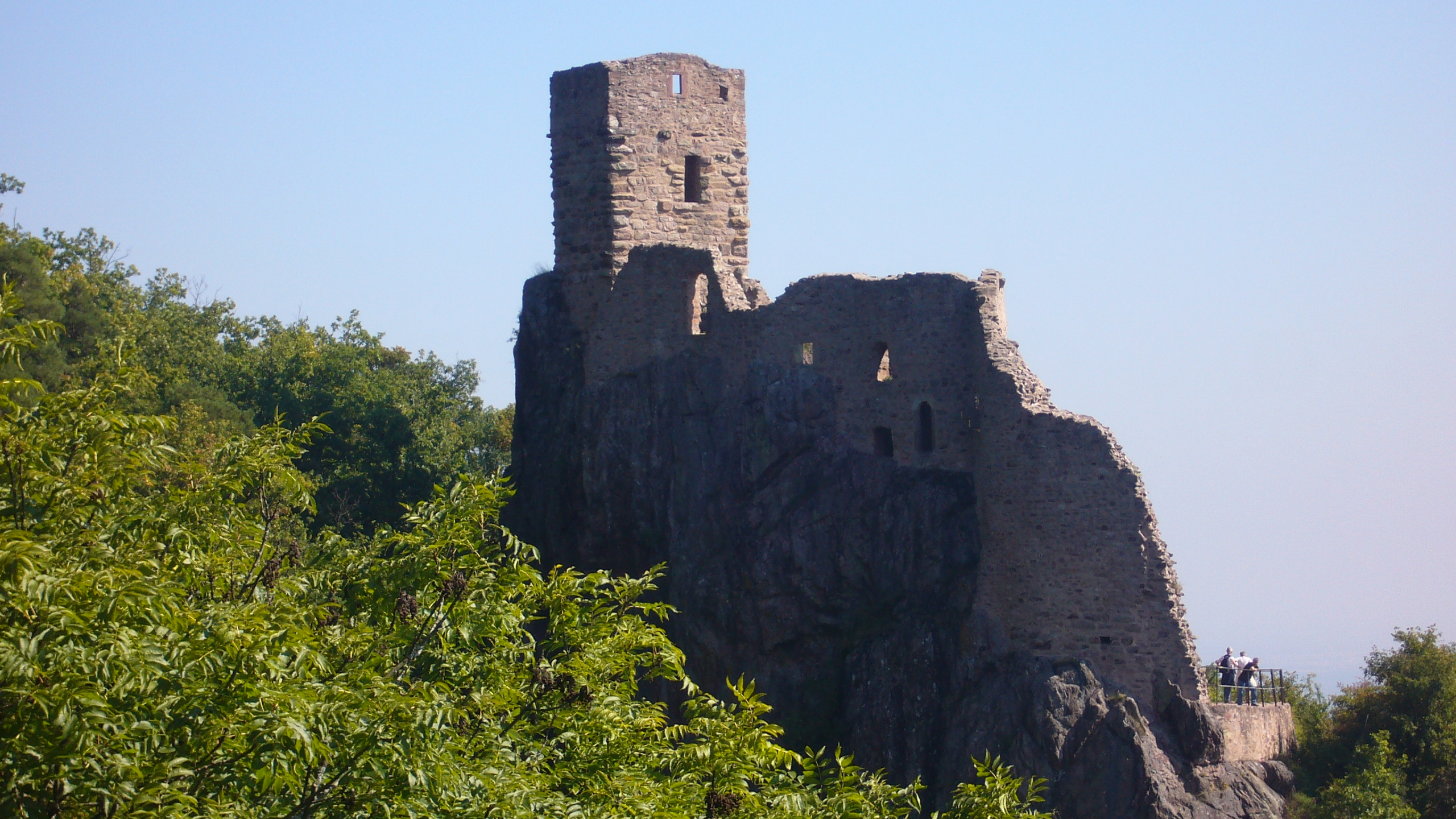
Château du Girsberg

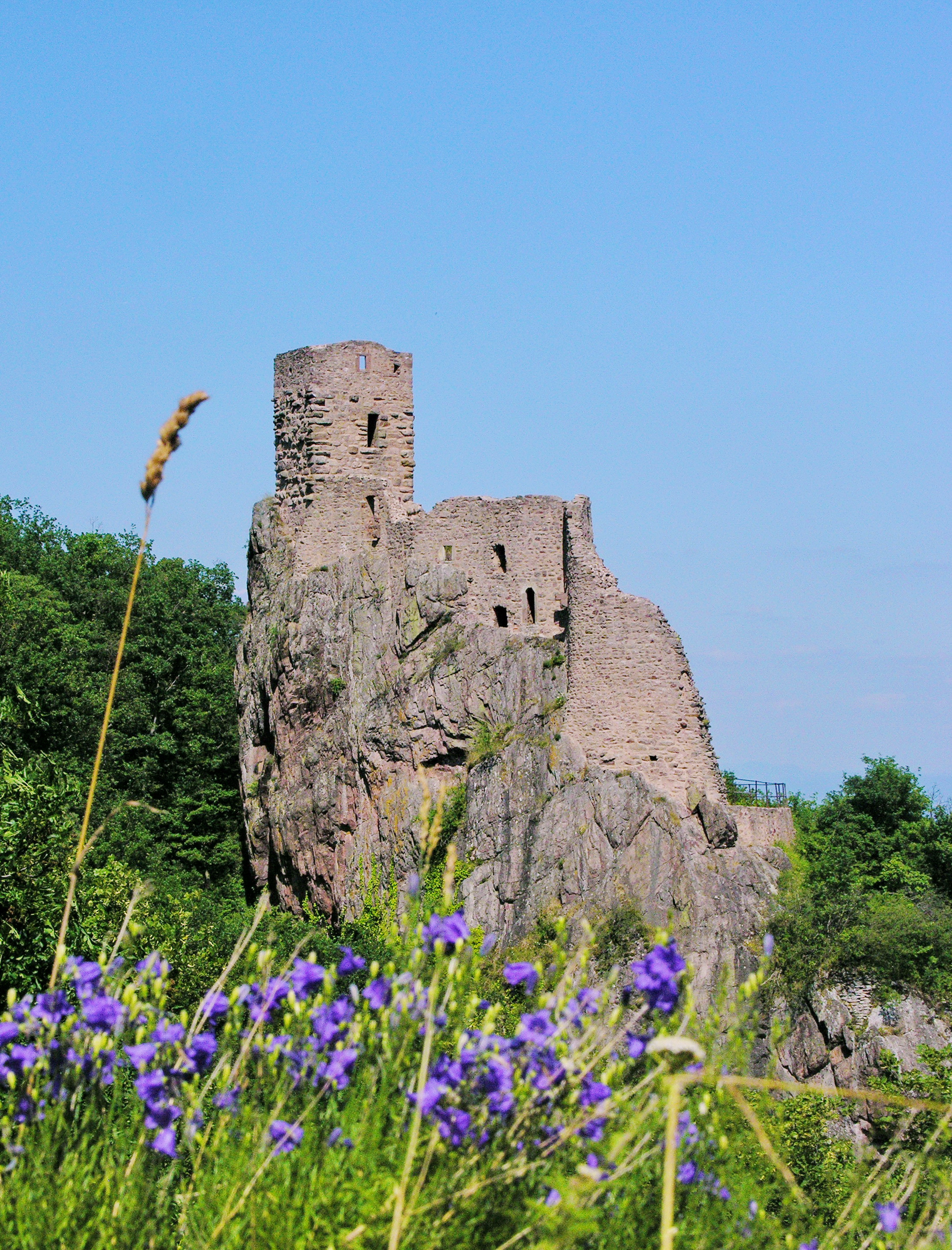
Château du Girsberg in the spring

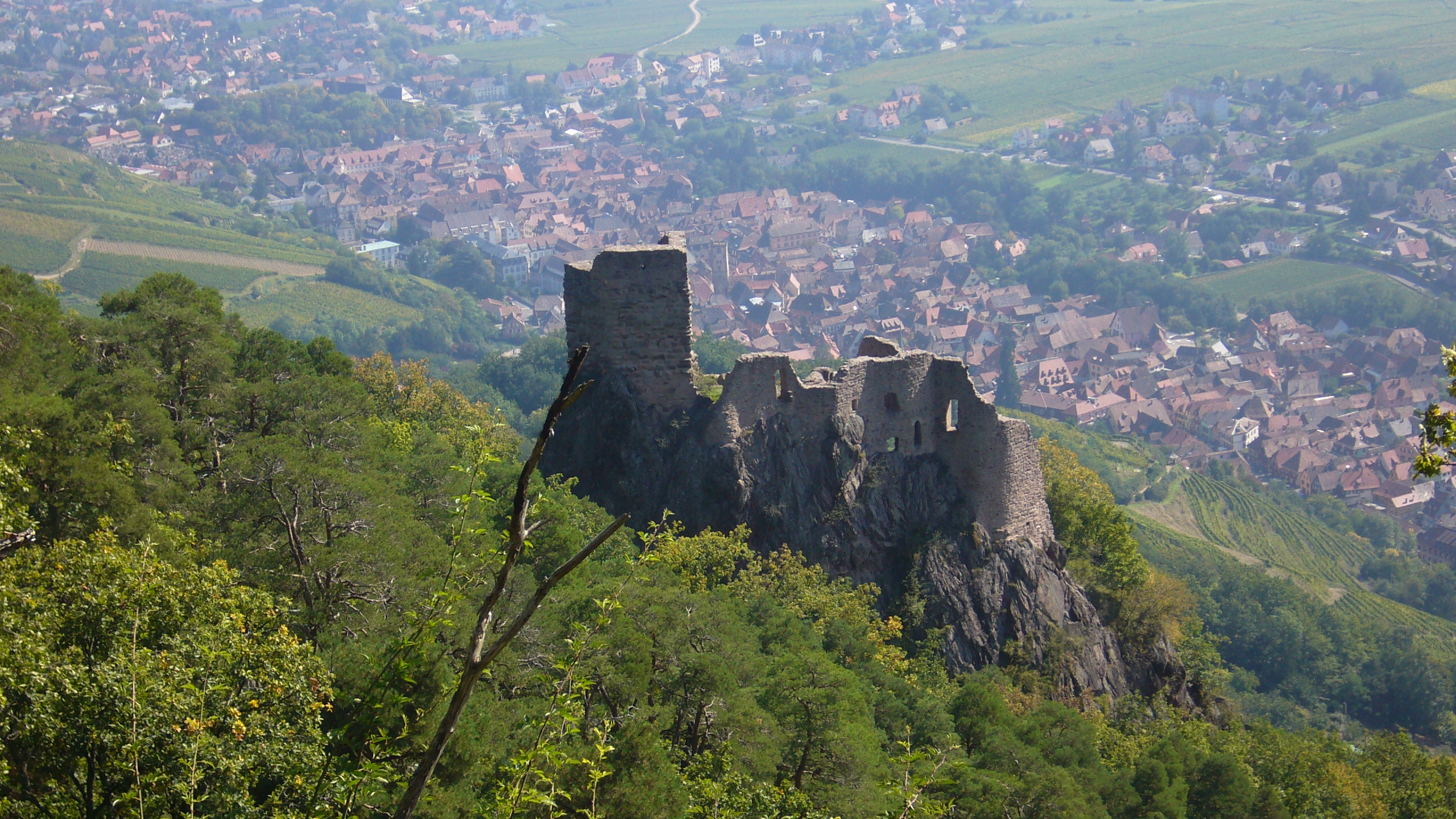
Château du Girsberg from a distance

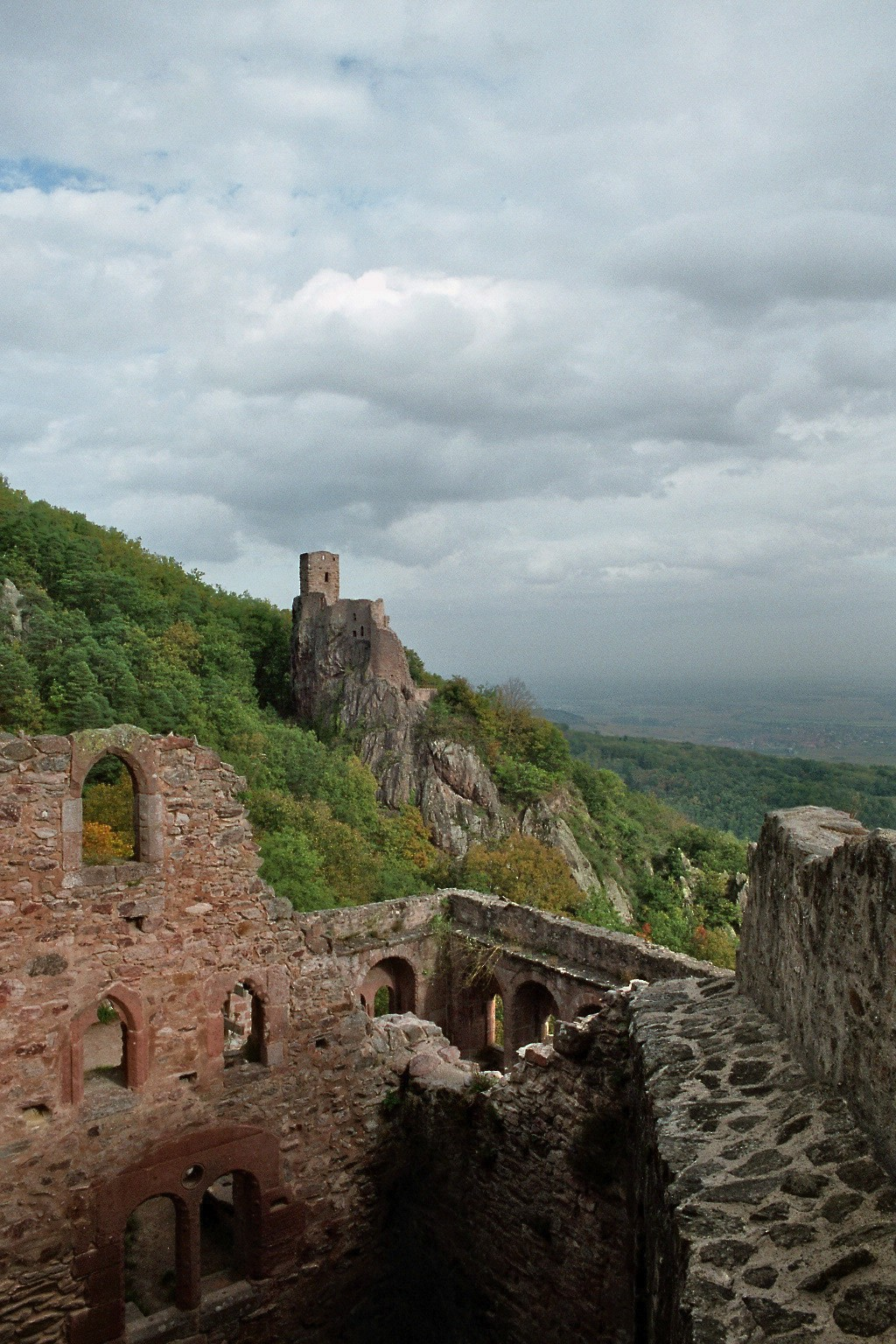
Château du Girsberg with Château de Saint-Ulrich in the foreground

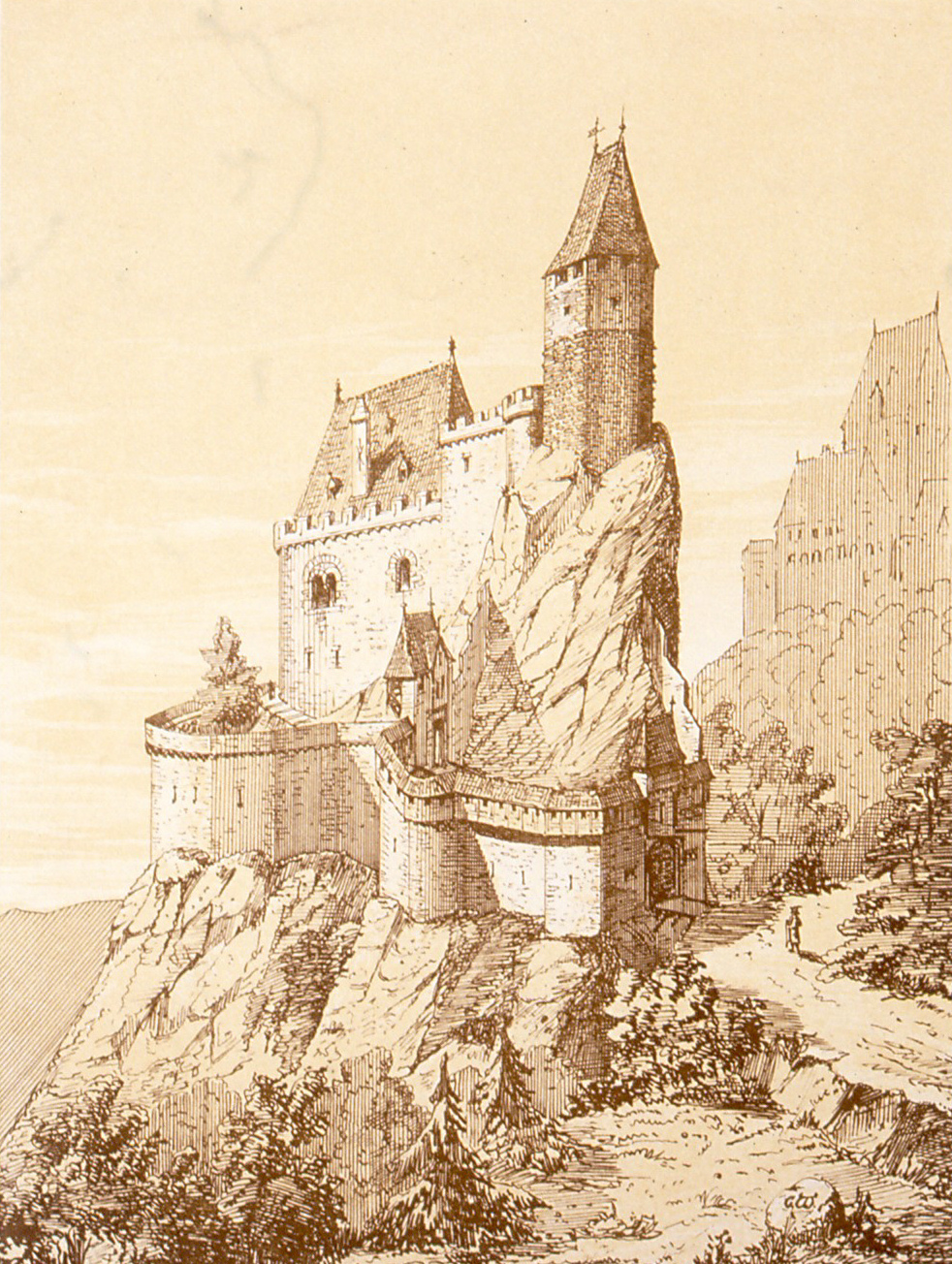
19th century drawing of Château du Girsberg

== See also ==
- List of castles in France

== Bibliography ==
- Braun, Jean : Circuit des châteaux forts d'Alsace - Ingersheim : éd. SAEP, 1978 - collection Delta 2000.
- Carmona, Christophe & Trendel, Guy : Les Châteaux autour de Ribeauvillé et Ricquewihr - Sarreguemines : éd. Pierron, 2001 - collection Les Châteaux des Vosges : histoire, architecture, légendes no 7.
- Mengus, Nicolas : Au temps des châteaux forts en Alsace - Strasbourg : éd. Coprur, 2004.
