= Yvan Goll =

French-German poet (1891–1950)

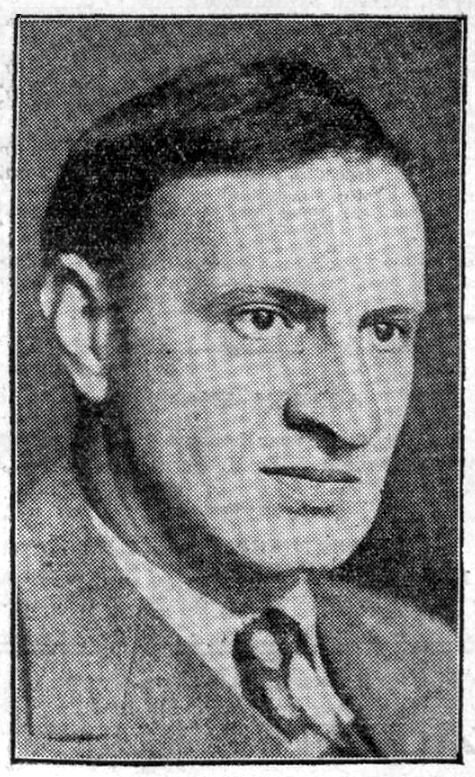
- Goll in 1932
- Born: Issac Lang; 29 March 1891; Saint-Dié-des-Vosges, Lorraine, France (today Saint-Dié-des-Vosges, Vosges department, France)
- Died: 27 February 1950 (aged 58); Neuilly-sur-Seine, Paris, France
- Citizenship: German; American from 1945
- Education: studied jurisprudence at the University of Strasbourg, 1912–14; University of Lausanne, 1915–18
- Occupations: Poet, Librettist, Playwright
- Spouse: Claire Studer née Aischmann (1921–1977)
- Writing career
- Period: 1914–1950
- Movements: Expressionism, Surrealism

Yvan Goll (also written Iwan Goll, Ivan Goll; born Isaac Lang; 29 March 1891 – 27 February 1950) was a French-German poet who was bilingual and wrote in both French and German. He had close ties to both German expressionism and to French surrealism.

== Biography ==
Yvan Goll was born at Saint-Dié-des-Vosges, in Lorraine. His father was a cloth merchant from a Jewish family from Rappoltsweiler in Alsace. After his father's death when he was six years old, his mother joined relatives in Metz, then a major town of Lorraine in the 1871 German Empire (after 1918 the area was claimed by France). In this predominantly Lorraine/French-speaking western part of Alsace-Lorraine, high school education inevitably involved German. Later he went to Strasbourg and studied law at the university there, as well as in Freiburg and Munich, where he graduated in 1912. In 1913, Goll participated in the expressionist movement in Berlin. His first published poem of note, Der Panamakanal (The Panama Canal), contrasts a tragic view of human civilization-destroying nature, with an optimistic ending that evokes human brotherhood and the heroic construction of the canal. However, a later version of the poem from 1918 ends more pessimistically. At the outbreak of World War I he escaped to Switzerland to avoid conscription, and became friends with the dadaists of Zürich's Cabaret Voltaire, in particular Hans Arp, but also Tristan Tzara and Francis Picabia. He wrote many war poems, the most famous being 1916's "Requiem for the Dead of Europe", as well as several plays, including The Immortal One (1918).

It was in 1917, while in Switzerland that Goll met German writer and journalist Klara Aischmann, better known as Claire Goll. They settled in Paris in 1919 and married in 1921. In his essays, such as Die drei guten Geister Frankreichs (The Three Good Spirits of France), Goll promoted a better understanding between the peoples of France and Germany, even though he was personally more attracted to France by the greater liveliness of the art scene there. It was in Paris that his Expressionist style began to develop towards Surrealism, as witnessed in drama and film scenarios he wrote there, such as Die Chapliniade (The Chaplinade) and Mathusalem (Methusalem). These works blend fantasy, reality, and the absurd, continuing and extending the Expressionist program of arousing audience response by means of shock effects. They also reveal the autobiographical nature of much of Goll's writing, but also his tendency to appear in the guise of a persona rather than in the first person.

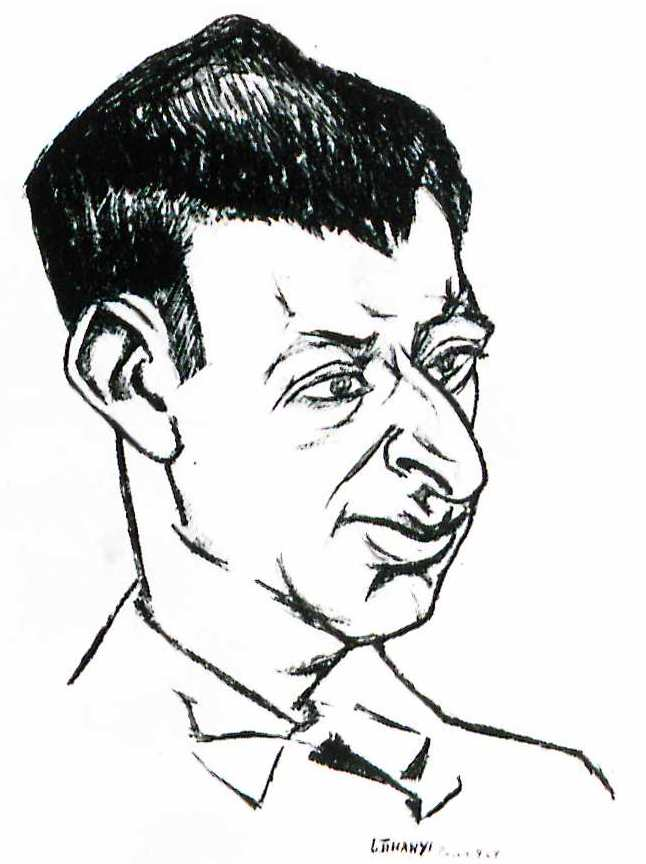
Yvan Goll by Lajos Tihanyi, 1927

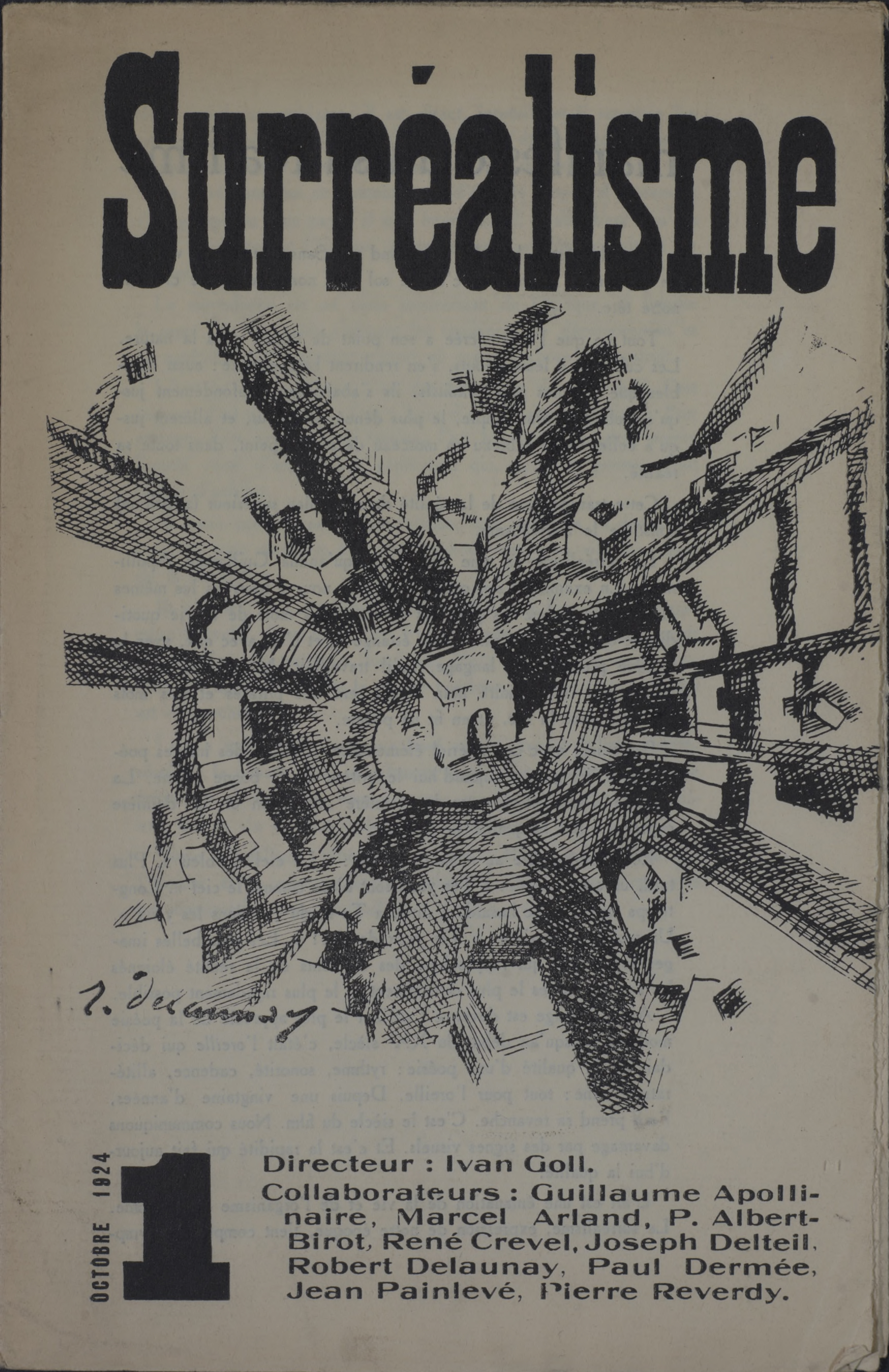
Yvan Goll, Surréalisme, Manifeste du surréalisme, Volume 1, Number 1, 1 October 1924, cover by Robert Delaunay

While in Paris he also worked as a translator into German (Blaise Cendrars and Ulysses, among others) and into French, adapting Georg Kaiser's Fire at the Opera (Der Brand im Opernhaus, 1919) for Théâtre de l'Œuvre. He formed many friendships with artists and his collection The New Orpheus was illustrated by Georg Grosz, Robert Delaunay and Fernand Léger. Marc Chagall illustrated a collection of love poems by both Golls, and Pablo Picasso illustrated Yvan's Élégie d'Ihpetonga suivi des masques de cendre (1949; "Elegy of Ihpetonga and Masks of Ashes"). Goll also published anthologies of other French and German poets, as well as translations. In 1924 he founded the magazine Surréalisme, publishing the first Manifeste du surréalisme and quarreled with André Breton and friends. In 1927, he wrote the libretto for a surrealist opera, Royal Palace, set to music by composer Kurt Weill. He also wrote the scenario for Der Neue Orpheus, a cantata set by Weill, and the opera Mélusine, set by Marcel Mihalovici in 1920 and again, this time in German, by Aribert Reimann in 1971.

As Nazi persecution grew in Germany during the 1930s, the theme of the wandering Jew became central to Goll's poetry. In 1936, he published an epic poem entitled La chanson de Jean Sans Terre (the song of John, King of England), with illustrations contributed by Marc Chagall. Jean Sans Terre was the youngest son of Henry II of England; following the battle of Bouvines, John lost the duchy of Normandy to King Philip II of France, which resulted in the collapse of most of the Angevin Empire and contributed to the subsequent growth in power of the Capetian dynasty during the 13th century. The central figure, who wanders the earth in 69 smaller poems, belongs everywhere and nowhere. He looks for love and identity and yet the absence of these things also acts as a kind of freedom. From 1939–1947 the Golls were exiles in New York, where friends included Richard Wright, Stefan Zweig, Henry Miller, Kenneth Patchen, Piet Mondrian, and William Carlos Williams who translated some of Yvan's poems. Between 1943 and 1946, Goll edited the French-American poetry magazine Hémispheres with works by Saint-John Perse, Césaire, Breton ... and young American poets.

In 1945, the year he was diagnosed with leukemia, he wrote Atom Elegy and other death-haunted poems collected in the English language volume Fruit From Saturn (1946). This poetic language of this final phase in Goll's work is rich in chthonic forces and imagery, the disintegration of matter - inspired by the atomic bomb - alchemy, and the Kabbalah, which Goll was reading at the time. Love Poems, written with his wife Claire, appeared in 1947. These poems, written in a pure and lucid style, speak of the poets' love and their need of each other, but also of jealousy, fear of betrayal, and a clash of temperaments. Goll's final works were written in German rather than French, and were collected by the poet under the title Traumkraut (a neologism - meaning something like 'Dream Weed'). Here, in his poetic testament, Goll mastered the synthesis of Expressionism and Surrealism that his work had hinted at most of his life; it was for this reason that he asked his wife to destroy all his previous work. These were eventually edited and brought to publishing by Claire. Goll died aged 58, at Neuilly-sur-Seine, and was buried at Père Lachaise Cemetery opposite the grave of Frédéric Chopin. The epitaph on his tombstone contains the following extract from Jean Sans Terre:

Je n'aurai pas duré plus que l'écume
Aux lèvres de la vague sur le sable
Né sous aucune étoile un soir sans lune
Mon nom ne fut qu'un sanglot périssable

Translation:

I did not last longer than the spume
On the lips of the wave on the sand
Born under no star on a moonless night
My name was only a perishable sob

In 1953 Claire confronted the poet's friend, Paul Celan with the accusation of plagiarism, unjustly claiming that Celan had copied from Yvan Goll's Traumkraut; Celan committed suicide in 1970.

Claire Goll died in 1977, and bequeathed to the town of Saint-Die-des-Vosges several French manuscripts, the couple's library, their works of art and furniture. The set - including a reconstruction of his Parisian apartment - is now on display at the Museum Pierre-Noël.
