= Reminiscence of Marie A. =

1920 poem by Bertolt Brecht

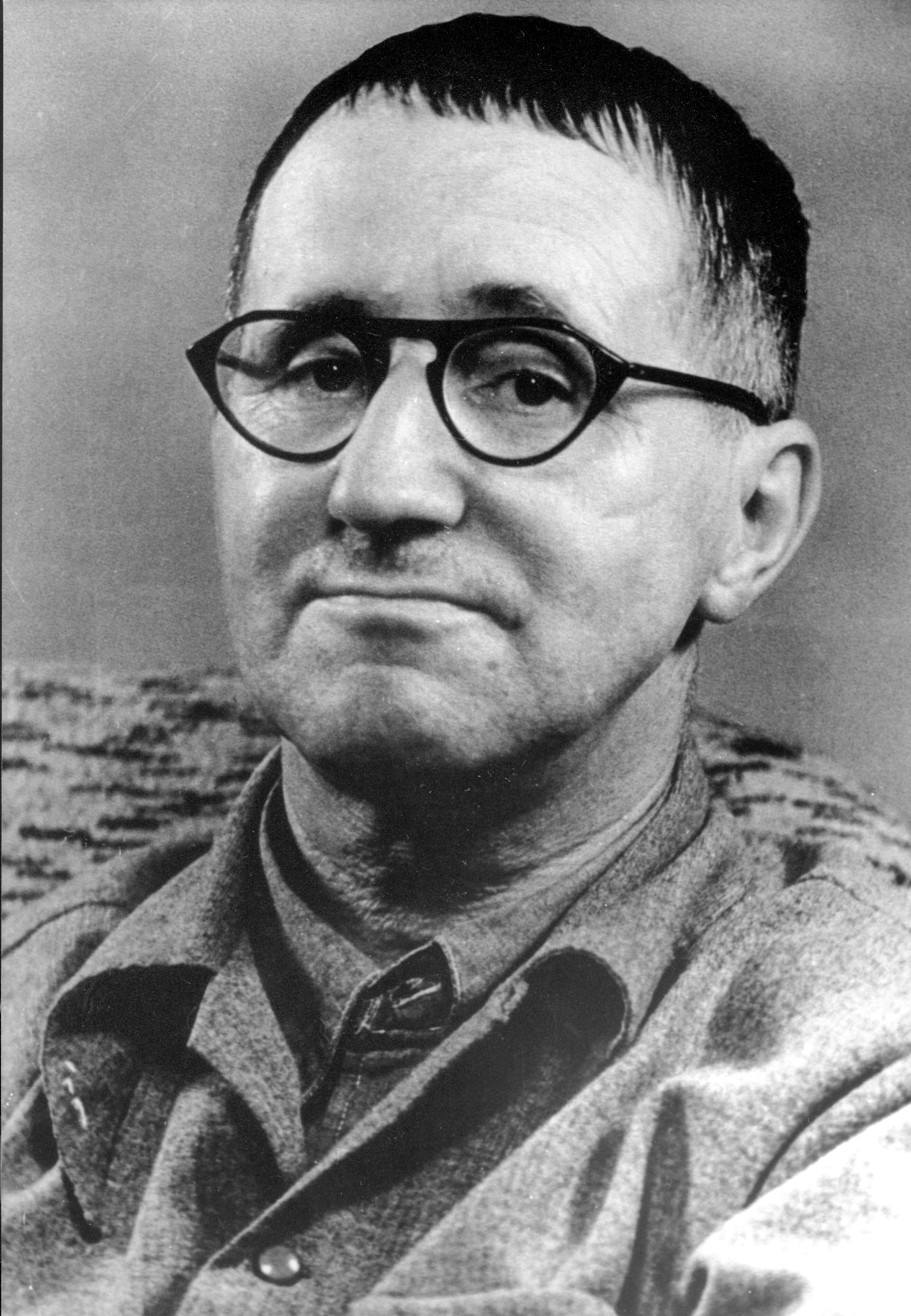
German poet Bertolt Brecht (1898–1956)

"Reminiscence of Marie A." or "Memory of Marie A." (German: "Erinnerung an die Marie A.") is a 1920 poem by German poet and playwright Bertolt Brecht (1898–1956) that was first published in his collection Hauspostille (1927). Brecht wrote the poem in his notebook on 21 February 1920 on a train to Berlin. The poem is a reminiscence of time spent with a former lover and a kiss beneath a plum tree remembered only because of the memory of a passing white cloud.

The poem's first stanza was read voice-over in the Oscar-winning 2006 German film The Lives of Others (Das Leben der Anderen), by the character of Stasi Captain Gerd Wiesler (played by Ulrich Mühe), lying back uncomfortably on his sofa:

An jenem Tag im blauen Mond September
Still unter einem jungen Pflaumenbaum
Da hielt ich sie, die stille bleiche Liebe
In meinem Arm wie einen holden Traum.
Und über uns im schönen Sommerhimmel
War eine Wolke, die ich lange sah
Sie war sehr weiß und ungeheuer oben
Und als ich aufsah, war sie nimmer da.

One day in blue-moon September
silent under a plum tree
I held her, my silent pale love
in my arms like a fair and lovely dream.
And above us in the summer sky
was a cloud that caught my eye.
It was white and so high up.
And when I looked up, it was no longer there.

A version set to music appeared on David Bowie's 1982 EP Baal.
