= Ribeauvillé =

Subprefecture and commune in Grand Est, France

Ribeauvillé Ràppschwihr (Alsatian) Rappoltsweiler (German)
- Commune
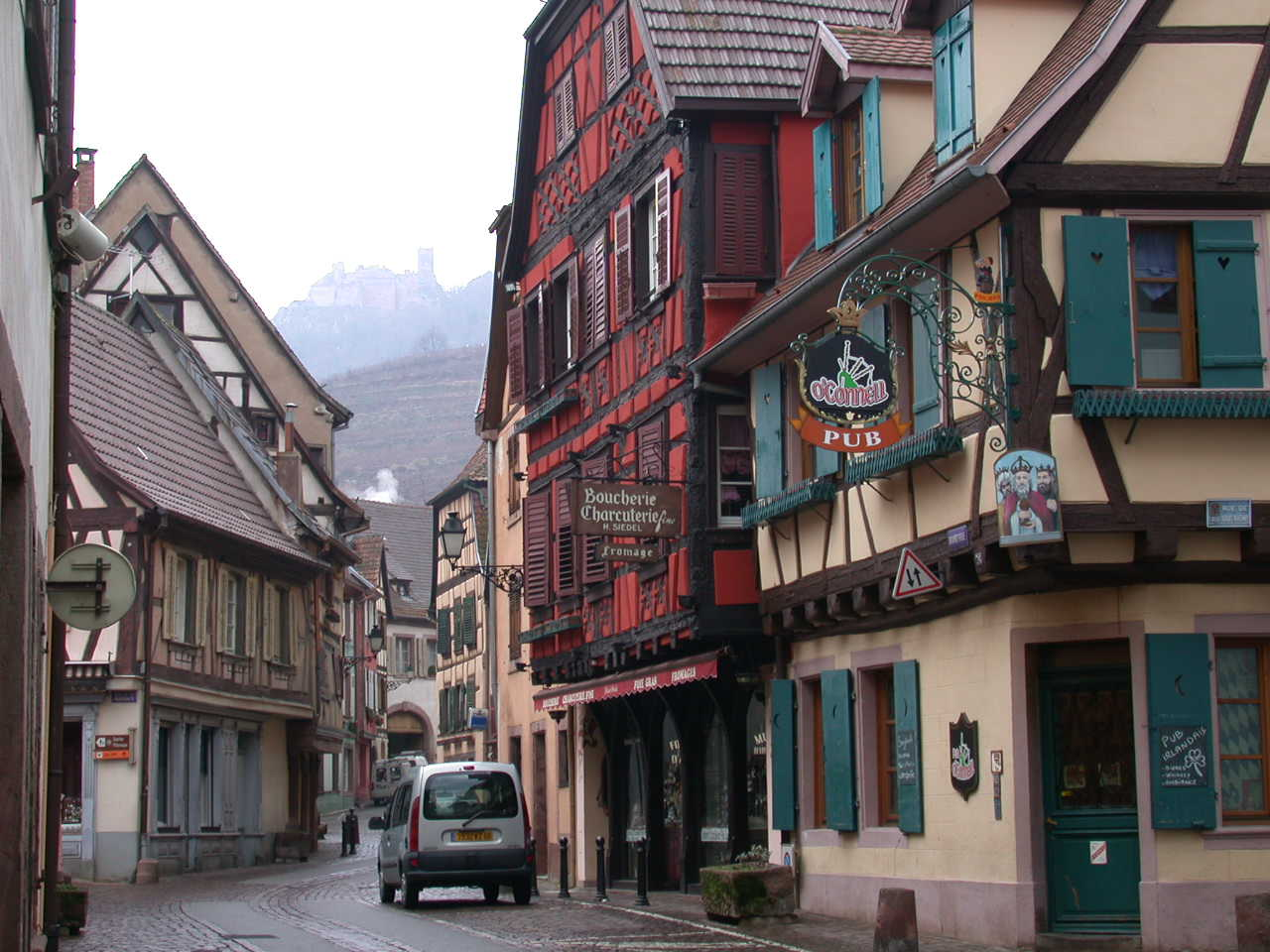
- Ribeauvillé and its castle

- Coat of arms
- Location of Ribeauvillé
- Location within France Location within Grand Est
- Coordinates: 48°12′N 7°19′E
- Country: France
- Region: Grand Est
- Department: Haut-Rhin
- Arrondissement: Colmar-Ribeauvillé
- Canton: Sainte-Marie-aux-Mines
- Intercommunality: Pays de Ribeauvillé

Government
  - Mayor (2020–2026): Jean-Louis Christ
- Area^{1}: 32.21 km^{2} (12.44 sq mi)
- Elevation: 240 m (790 ft)
- Highest elevation: 989 m (3,245 ft)
- Lowest elevation: 188 m (617 ft)
- Population (2023): 4,685
  - Density: 145.5/km^{2} (376.7/sq mi)
- Time zone: UTC+01:00 (CET)
  - Summer (DST): UTC+02:00 (CEST)
- INSEE/Postal code: 68269 /68150
- ^{1} French Land Register data, which excludes lakes, ponds, glaciers > 1 km^{2} (0.386 sq mi or 247 acres) and river estuaries.

Ribeauvillé (French pronunciation: [ʁibovile] is the French name of Ràppschwihr (German: Rappoltsweiler), a commune in the Haut-Rhin department in Grand Est in north-eastern France. It was a sub-prefecture of the department until 2015.

== Geography ==
The town is located around 16 kilometres (10 mi) north of Colmar and 75 kilometres (47 mi) south of Strasbourg. It lies at the base of the Vosges Mountains.

=== Climate ===
Ribeauvillé has an oceanic climate (Köppen climate classification Cfb). The average annual temperature in Ribeauvillé is 11.4 °C (52.5 °F). The average annual rainfall is 714.9 mm (28.15 in) with August as the wettest month. The temperatures are highest on average in July, at around 20.5 °C (68.9 °F), and lowest in January, at around 1.8 °C (35.2 °F). The highest temperature ever recorded in Ribeauvillé was 40.1 °C (104.2 °F) on 25 July 2019; the coldest temperature ever recorded was −17.7 °C (0.1 °F) on 20 December 2009.

Climate data for Ribeauvillé (1981–2010 averages, extremes 1995−2020)
Month	Jan	Feb	Mar	Apr	May	Jun	Jul	Aug	Sep	Oct	Nov	Dec	Year
Record high °C (°F)	17.1 (62.8)	21.9 (71.4)	24.2 (75.6)	29.9 (85.8)	34.6 (94.3)	37.9 (100.2)	40.1 (104.2)	39.7 (103.5)	33.9 (93.0)	29.8 (85.6)	22.9 (73.2)	17.5 (63.5)	40.1 (104.2)
Mean daily maximum °C (°F)	4.8 (40.6)	7.9 (46.2)	11.7 (53.1)	16.5 (61.7)	21.1 (70.0)	24.7 (76.5)	26.1 (79.0)	25.5 (77.9)	21.2 (70.2)	16.3 (61.3)	9.3 (48.7)	5.0 (41.0)	15.9 (60.6)
Daily mean °C (°F)	1.8 (35.2)	4.1 (39.4)	7.2 (45.0)	11.3 (52.3)	15.8 (60.4)	19.2 (66.6)	20.5 (68.9)	20.0 (68.0)	15.9 (60.6)	11.8 (53.2)	6.0 (42.8)	2.3 (36.1)	11.4 (52.5)
Mean daily minimum °C (°F)	−1.2 (29.8)	0.3 (32.5)	2.7 (36.9)	6.1 (43.0)	10.5 (50.9)	13.6 (56.5)	14.9 (58.8)	14.5 (58.1)	10.7 (51.3)	7.3 (45.1)	2.7 (36.9)	−0.3 (31.5)	6.8 (44.2)
Record low °C (°F)	−15.0 (5.0)	−14.1 (6.6)	−11.4 (11.5)	−3.7 (25.3)	.9 (33.6)	4.3 (39.7)	6.0 (42.8)	6.0 (42.8)	1.4 (34.5)	−4.0 (24.8)	−10.4 (13.3)	−17.7 (0.1)	−17.7 (0.1)
Average precipitation mm (inches)	44.8 (1.76)	48.1 (1.89)	48.5 (1.91)	45.4 (1.79)	74.1 (2.92)	66.3 (2.61)	74.2 (2.92)	78.2 (3.08)	52.1 (2.05)	68.4 (2.69)	56.7 (2.23)	58.1 (2.29)	714.9 (28.15)
Average precipitation days (≥ 1.0 mm)	9.4	9.6	10.3	9.1	11.0	9.1	10.7	10.8	7.3	9.5	10.9	10.9	118.6
Source: Meteociel

== History ==
Coat of arms of the counts of Rappoltstein, who ruled the territory until 1673

Known in the 8th century as Rathaldovilare, the town passed from the Bishops of Basel to the Lords and later Counts of Rappoltstein, who were among the most famous nobles in Alsace. The Count of Rappoltstein was the King or Protector of the wandering minstrels of the land, who purchased his protection by paying him a tax.

When the family became extinct in 1673, this office of "King of the Pipers" (Pfeiferkönig) passed to the Counts Palatine of Zweibrücken-Birkenfeld. The last Sovereign Count (1778-1790) was Maximilian of Zweibrücken-Birkenfeld, later Prince-Elector of Bavaria and Palatinate (1799-1805) and first King of Bavaria (1806-1825).

The minstrels had a pilgrimage chapel near Rappoltsweiler, dedicated to their patron saint, Maria von Dusenbach, and here they held an annual feast on 8 September. Ribeauvillé was known as Rappoltsweiler until 1918.

=== Sisters of Divine Providence of Ribeauvillé ===
The congregation was founded in 1783 by Father Louis Kremp, vicar at Molsheim in Alsace, and Madelaine Ehrhard to educate young girls, particularly those of rural areas. After the death of Father Kremp, Bruno and Ignace Mertian, two brothers priests of the diocese of Strasbourg, structure and organize the young association.

In 1819, the sisters settled in Ribeauvillé in the former Augustinian convent which became the Mother House of the congregation. From this date, they are called "the Sisters of the Divine Providence of Ribeauvillé". The statutes are approved by Napoleon 1st in 1807, by the bishop of Strasbourg in 1824 and by Pope Pius IX in 1869. By the end of the 19th century, most of the female youth of Alsace is educated by the sisters, in many public schools in the city as in the countryside.

As of 2019, there are over 400 sisters serving in Europe, Africa, and South America.

== Population ==
Historical population
Year	Pop.	±% p.a.
1968	4,137	—
1975	4,282	+0.49%
1982	4,506	+0.73%
1990	4,774	+0.72%
1999	4,929	+0.36%
2007	4,916	−0.03%
2012	4,806	−0.45%
2017	4,729	−0.32%
2023	4,685	−0.16%
Source: INSEE

Its inhabitants are called Ribeauvillois in French.

== Sights ==
Ribeauvillé is in part surrounded by ancient walls, and has many picturesque medieval houses, and two old churches, of St Gregory and St Augustine, both fine Gothic buildings. The town hall contains a valuable collection of antiquities. The Carolabad, a saline spring with a temperature of 18 °C (64 °F). (which held a great reputation in the Middle Ages), was re-discovered in 1888, and made Ribeauvillé a spa.

Near the town are the ruins of three famous castles, Saint-Ulrich, Girsberg and Haut-Ribeaupierre, which formerly belonged to the lords of Ribeaupierre (or Rappoltstein).

The forest of Ribeauvillé is home to the largest giant sequoia outside of the United States.

The former synagogue of the Jewish community is located on the Rue de la Synagogue and is currently used as the town's cinema.

== Economy ==
The economy of Ribeauvillé is mainly based on:

- Tourism, because of its historical heritage and several festivals as, for example Fête des Ménétriers or " Pfifferdaj" (first week-end of September) and Marché de Noël (Christmas);
- Viticulture: Ribeauvillé is located in the middle of the Alsace wineyards and is home to many viticulturists. Most of them are associated in a winemaking co-operative named Cave de Ribeauvillé (established 1895), one of the oldest in France;
- Manufacturing: There is the fabric printing factory Beauvillé and a Cordon Electronics factory located nearby.

== Notable people ==
- Philipp Jakob Spener (1635–1705), Lutheran theologian
- Johann Baptist Wendling (1723–1797), flautist and composer
- Jean-Michel Beysser (1753–1794), French general
- Carl August von Steinheil (1801–1870), physicist
- Maurice Lévy (1838–1910), engineer
- Jean-François Klobb (1857–1899), French officer
- Hubert Keller, chef

== See also ==
- Communes of the Haut-Rhin department
