= Hans Münch-Holland =

German cellist and academic teacher

Hans Rudolph Münch-Holland (born Münch 15 January 1899 – 7 December 1971) was a German cellist and academic teacher. He taught in Cologne and Detmold.

== Life ==
Münch-Holland was born in 1899 in Bern as the son of the merchant Georg Münch and his wife Frieda, née Dieffenbacher. After attending the Oberrealschule in Stuttgart (until 1914) he studied at the Stuttgart Conservatory with Alfred Saal. His studies were interrupted by military service in 1917/18. In 1920/21 he was cellist with the Stuttgart Chamber Trio. Afterwards he became solo cellist and concertmaster at the Staatstheater Stuttgart. He also taught at the conservatory there.

In the 1920s he declined offers for the Staatskapelle Dresden. In 1924 he changed to the Gewandhausorchester in Leipzig as principal cellist. From 1926 to 1933 he was a member of the Gewandhaus Quartet. In 1926 he replaced Julius Klengel in the Leipzig Trio, where he played with Edgar Wollgandt (violin) and Otto Weinreich (piano). Erich H. Müller (ed.): Deutsches Musiker-Lexikon. W. Limpert-Verlag, Dresden 1929. He also taught at the Leipzig Conservatory from 1927 to 1933. Afterwards he was appointed professor at the University of Music and Dance Cologne. In 1938 he appeared with Willy Hülser at the Reichsmusiktagein Düsseldorf. 2nd edition, Kopf, Kiel 2009, ISBN 978-3-00-037705-1, p. 3669. From 1939 to 1953 he was a member of the Strub Quartet around Max Strub. In 1944 he was included in the Gottbegnadeten list as one of the most important German cellists. In October 1944 he left Cologne for Hildesheim. in the Lippische Mitteilungen aus Geschichte und Landeskunde 46 (1977), p. 5–64, here p. 62.

In 1946 he was one of the founding fathers of the Hochschule für Musik Detmold. Until 1964 he held a professorship there. At times, he was also deputy director of the institution. Among his students were Gerhard Enger and Rudolf Metzmacher. In the 1950s he was part of a piano trio in Detmold with the violinist Max Strub and the pianist Hans Richter-Haaser. J. E. Ronayne, London 1999, ISBN 0-9536096-0-X, p. 74.

In the years 1924 and 1937 he was appointed to the Bayreuth Festival orchestra. Lienau, Berlin 1997, ISBN 3-87484-125-1, p. 150.

Münch-Holland, an Evangelical Lutheran, was married three times. His first marriage to Margarete (Gretel) Holland produced two children. His second marriage to Irmgard Münch-Holland, née Müngersdorf, produced one son. After divorcing her, he was married to his former pupil Gunhild Münch-Holland, née Urhahn. He died in Lemgo at the age of 72.

== Awards ==
- 1967: Order of Merit of the Federal Republic of Germany 1. Class

== Literature ==
- Hans-Rainer Jung, Claudius Böhm: Das Gewandhaus-Orchester. Seine Mitglieder und seine Geschichte seit 1743. Faber & Faber, Leipzig 2006, ISBN 3-936618-86-0, p. 210f.
- Ernst Klee: Kulturlexikon zum Dritten Reich. Wer war was vor und nach 1945. Reworked edition, Fischer, Frankfurt 2009, ISBN 978-3-596-17153-8, p. 382.
- Erich H. Müller (ed.): Deutsches Musiker-Lexikon. W. Limpert-Verlag, Dresden 1929.
