= Gerhard Bosse =

German violinist and conductor

Gerhard Bosse (23 January 1922 – 1 February 2012) was a German violinist and conductor.

== Life ==
Bosse was born in Wurzen in 1922 as son of the military musician Oskar Bosse (1893-1979) and grew up in Greiz. He received his first violin lessons from his father at the age of six. From 1930 he was instructed by the Konzertmeister of the Reußische Hofkapelle. He went to Leipzig in 1936 and attended Edgar Wollgandt's classes. After graduating from high school in 1940 he studied violin with Walther Davisson at the University of Music and Theatre Leipzig. Already during his studies he was engaged as a substitute with the Leipzig Gewandhaus Orchestra. In 1943 he was appointed to the Reichs-Bruckner-Orchester in Linz and played under conductors like Karl Böhm, Wilhelm Furtwängler, Carl Schuricht, Herbert von Karajan, Oswald Kabasta and Joseph Keilberth. He also studied singing at the Linz Conservatory.

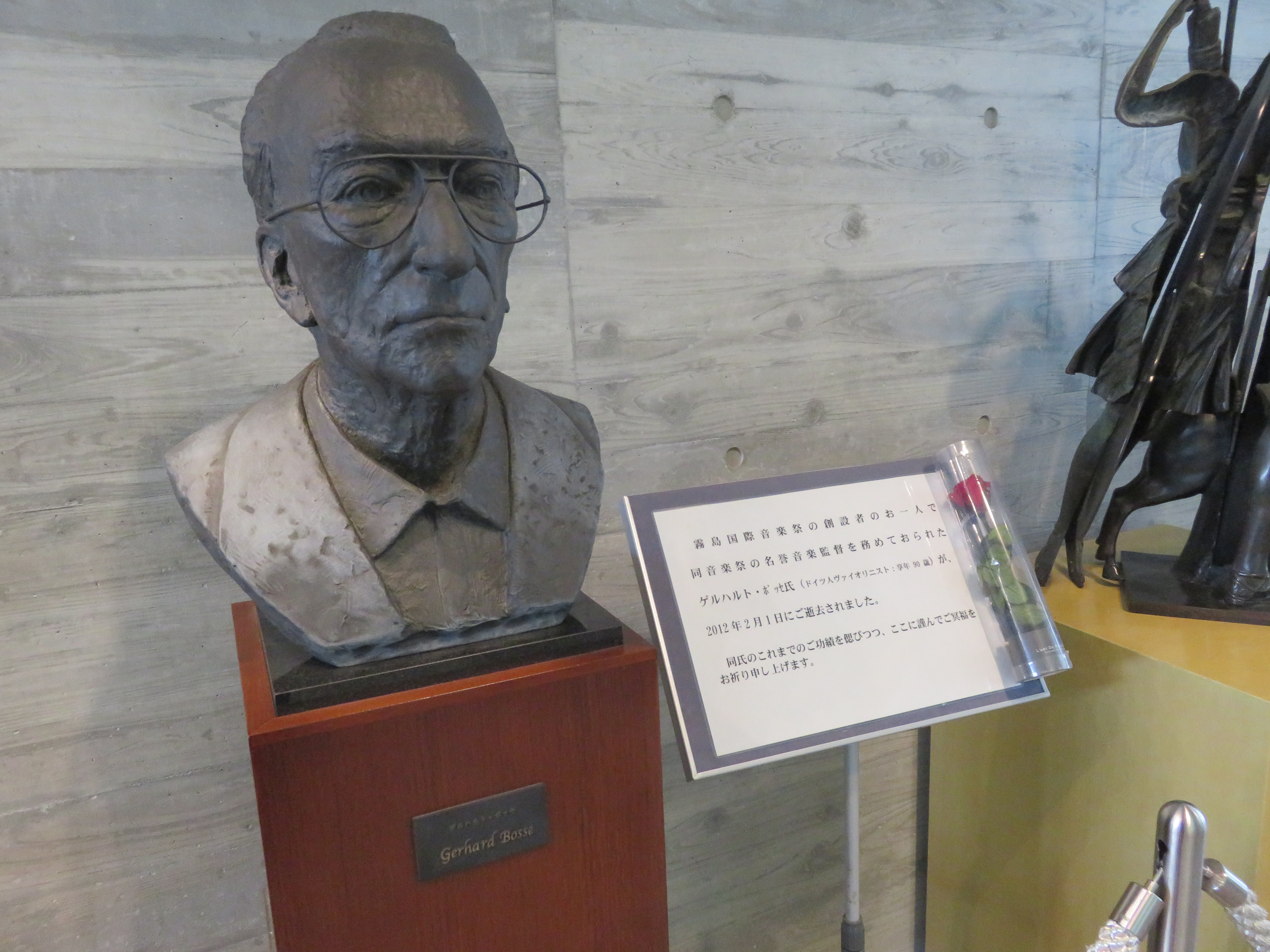
Statue of Gerhard Bosse

From 1948 to 1951 he was concertmaster of the Small Radio Orchestra Weimar. In 1949 Bosse became professor at the Hochschule für Musik Franz Liszt, Weimar and in 1951 first concertmaster of the MDR Leipzig Radio Symphony Orchestra under Hermann Abendroth. He also received a professorship at the Leipzig Academy of Music. From 1955 to 1987 Bosse was concertmaster of the Gewandhaus Orchestra under the conductors Franz Konwitschny, Václav Neumann and Kurt Masur. From 1955 to 1977 he was Primarius of the Gewandhaus Quartet. In 1963, Bosse founded the Bachorchester zu Leipzig, which he himself conducted until 1987.

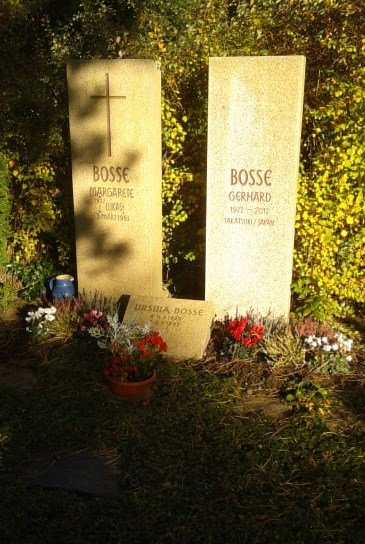
Gravestone for Gerhard Bosse and relatives at the Südfriedhof in Leipzig

In 1980, Bosse founded the Kirishima International Music Festival in Japan. He was also guest conductor of the New Japan Philharmonic and guest professor at the Tokyo University of the Arts. In 2000, he became music director of the Kobe City Chamber Orchestra and two years later advisor to the New Japan Philharmonic.

Bosse died in Takatsuki at the age of 90.

== Students ==
Among his large circle of students were Hans-Christian Bartel, Dietmar Hallmann and Karl Suske.

== Honours, prizes and awards ==
- National Prize of the German Democratic Republic for art and literature, III. class in collective Gewandhaus-Quartett (1962)
- Arthur-Nikisch-Preis (1972)
- Patriotic Order of Merit in Silver (1972)
- Vaterländischer Verdienstorden in Gold (1974)
- Kunstpreis der Stadt Leipzig (1980)
- Nationalpreis der DDR für Kunst und Literatur, II. Klasse (1986)
- Bundesverdienstkreuz 1. Klasse (1998)
- Kobe City Cultural Award (2005, 2008)
- ExxonMobil Music Award (2008)
- Honorary member of the Gewandhaus Orchestra (2011)

== Literature ==
- Hans-Rainer Jung, Claudius Böhm: Das Gewandhaus-Orchester. Seine Mitglieder und seine Geschichte seit 1743. Faber & Faber, Leipzig 2006, ISBN 978-3-936618-86-0, p. 259.
- Steffen Lieberwirth: Bosse. Ein Leben am ersten Pult. Edition Peters, Leipzig 1987, ISBN 3-369-00037-7.
- Bosse, Gerhard. In Brockhaus Riemann Musiklexikon. CD-Rom, Directmedia Publishing, Berlin 2004, ISBN 3-89853-438-3, p. 1329.
