= Dietmar Hallmann =

German composer

Dietmar Hallmann (born 5 April 1935) is a German musician who was professor for viola and chamber music at the University of Music and Theatre Leipzig.

== Life ==
Hallmann was born in Breslau.After the Second World War Hallmann moved to Burkhardtsdorf. From 1954 to 1957 he studied music with violin as his main subject with Gerhard Bosse in Leipzig. First he was first violinist in the Leipzig Gewandhaus Orchestra. From 1960 to 1996 he was solo violist there. At the same time he was active in the Gewandhaus Quartet from 1958 to 1993. He was co-founder of the Bach Orchestra of the Leipzig Gewandhaus Orchestra.

As a soloist, his work was devoted to the works New Music in addition to the classical repertoire. composers and their premieres mostly with the Gewandhaus Orchestra. The spectrum of musical encounters ranges from Wilhelm Backhaus, Elly Ney, Claudio Arrau, Leopold Stokowski, Franz Konwitschny, David Oistrach, Leonid Kogan, Sviatoslav Richter etc. to more recent personalities like Rudolf Buchbinder and Frank Peter Zimmermann.

Since 1960 he has taught viola at the University of Music and Theatre Leipzig. In 1979 he was appointed professor. He retired in 2000 and many of his students now play in orchestras at home and abroad. He is currently a freelance teacher and writes compositions and transcriptions.

== Prizes ==
- 1957 First prize at a violin competition in Vogtland
- 1962 National Prize of the German Democratic Republic for art and literature, 3rd grade in collective with the Gewandhaus-Quartett

== Compositions ==
- 1984: Ballata virtuosità for viola solo (compulsory piece for the International Viola Competition in Markneukirchen)
- 2002: 5 Miniaturen für junge Spieler for string trio
- 2003: 6 Bagatellen for viola and piano
- 2003: Fantasie Nr. 13 in the style of Telemann for viola solo
- further a series of cadenzas and rondo entries to the viola concertos by Stamitz, Hoffmeister, Zelter, Brixi, Wanhal, Mozart KV 216 (for the American edition in C major), Mozart Concert D major KV 218 and Gyula Dávid
- 2003: Transcriptions for viola: Beethoven Op. 30/1 Sonata A major, C. v. Weber Grande Duo, Brahms Op. 100 Sonata A major, Dvořák Sonatine Op. 100, César Franck Sonata, Mozart's Violin Concerto D major K. 218
- 2005: Hoffmeister Paraphrasen
- 2007: Kadenzen zu Konzerten für Viola und Orchester aus dem 18. - 20. Jahrhundert : Viola.
- 2013: Due capricci für Viola und Kontrabaß.

== Literature ==
- Hans-Rainer Jung, Claudius Böhm: Das Gewandhaus-Orchester. Seine Mitglieder und seine Geschichte seit 1743. Faber & Faber, Leipzig 2006, ISBN 978-3-936618-86-0, p. 265
