= Otto Weinreich (pianist) =

German classical pianist

Otto Weinreich (29 January 1882 – 1947) was a German classical pianist.

== Life ==
Weinreich, Protestant, was born in Kassel in 1882 as the son of Carl Weinreich and his wife Josephine Wolff. He attended the Oberrealschule in his native town and received piano lessons from Hugo Schreiner. From 1900 to 1904, he studied music at the University of Music and Theatre Leipzig. There, his teachers included Robert Teichmüller in piano, Paul Quasdorf and Stephan Krehl in music theory, Carl Reinecke and Heinrich Zöllner in musical composition. He also studied with Hugo Riemann and Hermann Kretzschmar at the Leipzig University.

From 1904 to 1906, he worked as a piano teacher and undertook concert tours. From 1906 to 1909, he was conductor of the academic "Sängerschaft Fridericiana" in Halle. From 1908 onwards, together with Edgar Wollgandt (violin) and Julius Klengel, and from 1926 with Hans Münch-Holland (cello), he founded the Leipzig Trio. From 1908 to 1914, he taught at the Hochschule für Musik Carl Maria von Weber Dresden. He was also active at the Leipzig Conservatory from 1911, where he became professor in 1926. His pupils included, among others, Ferhunde Erkin, Dieter Zechlin and Amadeus Webersinke.

He was also a member of the Deutscher Tonkünstlerverband, the Allgemeiner Deutscher Musikverein and the International Society for Contemporary Music.
