= Johann Georg Hermann Voigt =

German composer

Johann Georg Hermann Voigt (14 May 1769 – 24 February 1811) was a German organist, cellist, violist and composer.

== Life ==
Born in Osterwieck, Voigt was the son of Stadtmusikus' C. C. Voigt from the town of Osterwieck in the northern Harz foreland. At the age of seven years, he went in 1776 to his maternal grandfather, the town musician J. G. Rose in Quedlinburg, who gave him private piano and violin lessons until 1780. The death of his father and grandfather forced Voigt to look for other possibilities of musical education, whereby his stepfather also supported him.

In 1785 Voigt found a position as violinist at the Great Concert, the later Leipzig Gewandhaus Orchestra, in the fair city of Leipzig. In 1788 he enrolled at the University of Leipzig. From 1789 he was also active in church music.

In 1790 he accepted an offer as an organist at the Moritzburg castle in Zeitz, where as an artist in the end of the small town he did not find the hoped-for artistic satisfaction and suffered from a lack of recognition. Already after a relatively short time he quit the service at Zeitz castle organist and returned to Leipzig. Friedrich Fleischer, Leipzig 1864, pp. 229–230.

In 1801 he was accepted into the orchestra pension fund in Leipzig. He was a violinist, violist and cellist in concert and from 1801 to 1803 he was the foreplayers of the first violins, later first cellist and first violist. In 1801 he became substitute of the organist Adolf Heinrich Müller at the Alte Peterskirche (Leipzig), in 1802 he changed as Thomasorganist at the St. Thomas Church, Leipzig

In 1808/1809 he was one of the four co-founders of the Gewandhaus Quartet, along with Justus Johann Friedrich Dotzauer, Bartolomeo Campagnoli and Heinrich August Matthäi. His son Carl Ludwig Voigt followed in his father's footsteps and also learned to play the violoncello.

Voigt died in Leipzig at the age of 41.

== Work ==
Voigt composed twelve menuets for orchestra, seven quartets and three piano sonatas. Among his most famous works is the viola concerto opus 11.

== Literature ==
- Carl Ferdinand Becker: Die Tonkünstler des neunzehnten Jahrhunderts. Ein Kalendarisches Handbuch zur Kunstgeschichte. Leipzig 1849, p. 25.
- Die hundertundfünfzigjährige Geschichte der Leipziger Gewandhausconcerte 1743–1893. Leipzig 1893, p. 54.
- Hans-Rainer Jung: Das Gewandhaus-Orchester. Seine Mitglieder und seine Geschichte seit 1743. With contributions on cultural and contemporary history from Claudius Böhm, Faber and Faber, Leipzig 2006, ISBN 3-936618-86-0, p. 45.
- Martin Petzoldt: Die Thomasorganisten zu Leipzig, in Christian Wolff (ed.): Die Orgeln der Thomaskirche zu Leipzig., Evangelische Verlagsanstalt in Leipzig 2012, pp. 95–137 (p. 111 f.), ISBN 3-374-02300-2.
