= Karl Suske =

German violinist and concertmaster

Karl Johann Suske (born 15 March 1934) is a German violinist. In the course of his more than forty-year career as a musician, Suske has been first concertmaster of the Staatskapelle Berlin, the Leipzig Gewandhaus Orchestra as well as the Bayreuth Festival orchestra. He was also a member of the Leipzig Gewandhaus Quartet and founder of a quartet named after him in Berlin. Until 1990 Suske held professorships at the Hochschule für Musik Franz Liszt, Weimar and the University of Music and Theatre Leipzig.

== Life ==
Born in Reichenberg, Czechoslovakia, Suske received violin lessons in early childhood from his father, Franz Suske, who played second violins in the municipal orchestra of Reichenberg. After the end of the Second World War and expulsion from the Sudetenland the family settled in Greiz (Thuringia), where Suske resumed his violin lessons. In 1947 he became a pupil of the Weimar university teacher and violinist Gerhard Bosse, who grew up in Greiz. After the latter's move in 1951 he followed him to Leipzig, where Bosse worked as a violin professor and first concertmaster of the MDR Leipzig Radio Symphony Orchestra. After his graduation in 1954, Suske became first principal viola player and later concertmaster at the Leipzig Gewandhaus. In 1962 he became first concertmaster at the Staatsoper Unter den Linden, from where he returned to Leipzig in 1977 as first concertmaster of the Gewandhaus Orchestra at Kurt Masur's request. At the same time, Suske was concertmaster of the Bayreuth Festival Orchestra nine times from 1991 to 2000, and he was also repeatedly appointed by the NHK Symphony Orchestra in Tokyo as guest concertmaster.

== Chamber music activities ==
In 1951, his teacher Gerhard Bosse accepted Suske as second violinist in his newly founded string Quartet. In 1955 he also became second violinist in the traditional Leipzig Gewandhaus-Quartett. After moving to Berlin, he founded the "Suske Quartet" there in 1965, which was initially named after him (later Berlin String Quartet), which played an important role in the chamber music life of the GDR and with whom he made guest appearances in Europe, the US and Japan. In 1970, the quartet - consisting of Klaus Peters (Vl), Karl-Heinz Dommus (Va) and Matthias Pfaender (Cl) - was awarded the National Prize of the GDR "for its contribution to the masterful interpretation of works of the national cultural heritage and the socialist musical creation of the GDR", III class for art and literature. The completion of an entire recording of Beethoven's string quartets for the Eterna record label in 1980 also marked the end of this ensemble, as Suske became a member of the Gewandhaus Quartet again upon his return to Leipzig, whose first violinist he remained until 1993.

== Family ==
Suske is married and has four grown children. His daughter Cornelia Smaczny is a harpist in the Gewandhaus Orchestra, and his son Conrad is deputy concertmaster there. Conrad Zuske was also a member of the Gewandhaus Quartet.

== Prize ==
- National Prize of the German Democratic Republic
