= Hans-Christian Bartel =

German composer

Hans-Christian Bartel (born 27 November 1932 − 27 December 2014) was a German violist and composer.

== Life ==
Born in Altenburg, Bartel was the son of a teacher. He got his first violin lessons at the age of six. After graduating from high school he studied violin and viola with Gerhard Bosse and music composition with Ottmar Gerster at the University of Music and Theatre Leipzig from 1951 to 1956. In 1954 he changed from violin to viola. He received further impulses in piano with Manfred Reinelt and music history with Ernst Hermann Meyer.

From 1956 to 1958 he was a lecturer for composition, music theory, theory of forms and earning training at the Robert-Schumann-Conservatory Zwickau. From 1958 to 1996 he was a member of the Gewandhaus orchestra and from 1959 its solo violist. In 1970 he was co-founder and until 1978 member of the Gruppe Neue Musik Hanns Eisler of the MDR Leipzig Radio Symphony Orchestra.

Bartel has worked as composer among others with conductors such as Herbert Blomstedt, Rafael Kubelík, Kurt Masur and Rolf Reuter. His Concerto for small orchestra and solo viola was premiered in 1963 by the Gewandhaus Orchestra under Václav Neumann at the Leipzig Gewandhaus. In 1967 the premiere of the Concerto for Orchestra followed. In 2003 the orchestral version of his piano piece David and Goliath under Herbert Blomstedt was premiered, who also premiered the Violin Concerto with Thomas Zehetmair as soloist.

In 1963/64 and 1964/65 Bartel benefited a Mendelssohn Scholarship.

Bartel died in Leipzig at the age of 82.

== Compositions ==
- Streichquartett (1953)
- Variationen (1953/93)
- Streichtrio (1954/97)
- Quartett (1955/97/02)
- Konzert für kleines Orchester und Solobratsche. (1963)
- Konzert für Orchester (1967)
- Musik für Violoncello und Klavier (1988)
- Immer nur b-a-c-h für eine Geige (1996)
- Sonatine (1998)
- David und Goliath Scenes for Orchestra (2000)
- Laudato si, mi Signore für gemischten Chor a cappella (2000)
- Konzertstück (2001)
- Der sensible Tiger – Klavierstück (2005)
- Acht Lieder für Bariton und kleines Orchester (2002/2005)
- Konzert für Violine und Orchester (2008)
- Vokalsinfonie "Lieder vom Menschen" for baritone, Choir and Orchestra (2012)

== Discography ==
- Kammermusik und Lieder (AM 1997)
- Das Leipziger Gewandhausorchester spielt Werke von Hans-Christian Bartel (ITM 1998)
- Lieder vom Menschen – Vokalsinfonie (Transport music 2015)

== Literature ==
- Hans-Rainer Jung, Claudius Böhm: Das Gewandhaus-Orchester. Seine Mitglieder und seine Geschichte seit 1743. Faber & Faber, Leipzig 2006, ISBN 978-3-936618-86-0, p. 266.
