= Anton Jivaev =

Russian violist

- Born: 1976 (age 49–50); Tashkent, Uzbekistan
- Instrument: classical viola
- Member of: Gewandhaus Orchestra
- Formerly of: North Carolina Symphony; Gewandhaus Quartet

Anton Jivaev (born 1976) is a violist born in Uzbekistan, who made an international career as orchestra player, chamber musician and soloist. From 2012, he has been a violist of the Gewandhaus Orchestra in Leipzig, and from 2015 to 2023 was violist of the Gewandhaus Quartet.

== Life ==
Born in Tashkent, Uzbekistan, Jivaev was born to a family of Russian musicians. He received violin lessons from age seven at Nathan Mendelssohn's class of the Uspensky-Schule, a music high school for musically gifted children affiliated to the Tashkent conservatory. After graduating from school he was accepted at the conservatory, switching to viola at age 16, where he studied for three years with Alexander Polonsky. From 1997, Jivaev continued his studies in Pittsburgh, U.S., at the Artist Diploma Program of the Duquesne University with Randolph Kelly, the principal viola of the Pittsburgh Symphony Orchestra. As a winner of the Duquesne Concerto Competition, he played Hindemith's Der Schwanendreher with the Duquesne Symphony Orchestra in April 1999.

In autumn 1999 Jivaev began studying at the Curtis School of Music in Philadelphia with Joseph de Pasquale and later with Roberto Diaz. In December 2000, Jivaev played the world premiere of the Concertino for viola and ensemble at the Curtis School of Music, which another graduate, Yevgeniy Sharlat, had composed for him.

Jivaev has performed as a soloist, in chamber music and with orchestras, including occasionally the New York Philharmonic, the Philadelphia Orchestra, and the Pittsburgh Symphony Orchestra He has played with his nephew, violinist Daniel Khalikov, including Mozart's Sinfonia Concertante for Violin, Viola and Orchestra with the Classical Tahoe Orchestra, and with his sister, pianist Elena Jivaeva.

From September 2006 to 2012 Jivaev played principal viola with the North Carolina Symphony. He also works as a viola teacher and has repaired string instruments. Since 2012, Jivaev has been violist of the Gewandhaus Orchestra in Leipzig where he also played in the Gewandhaus Quartet from 2015 until 2023. The quartet performed a cycle of Beethoven string quartets in China and Japan.
