= Friedrich Dotzauer =

German cellist and composer

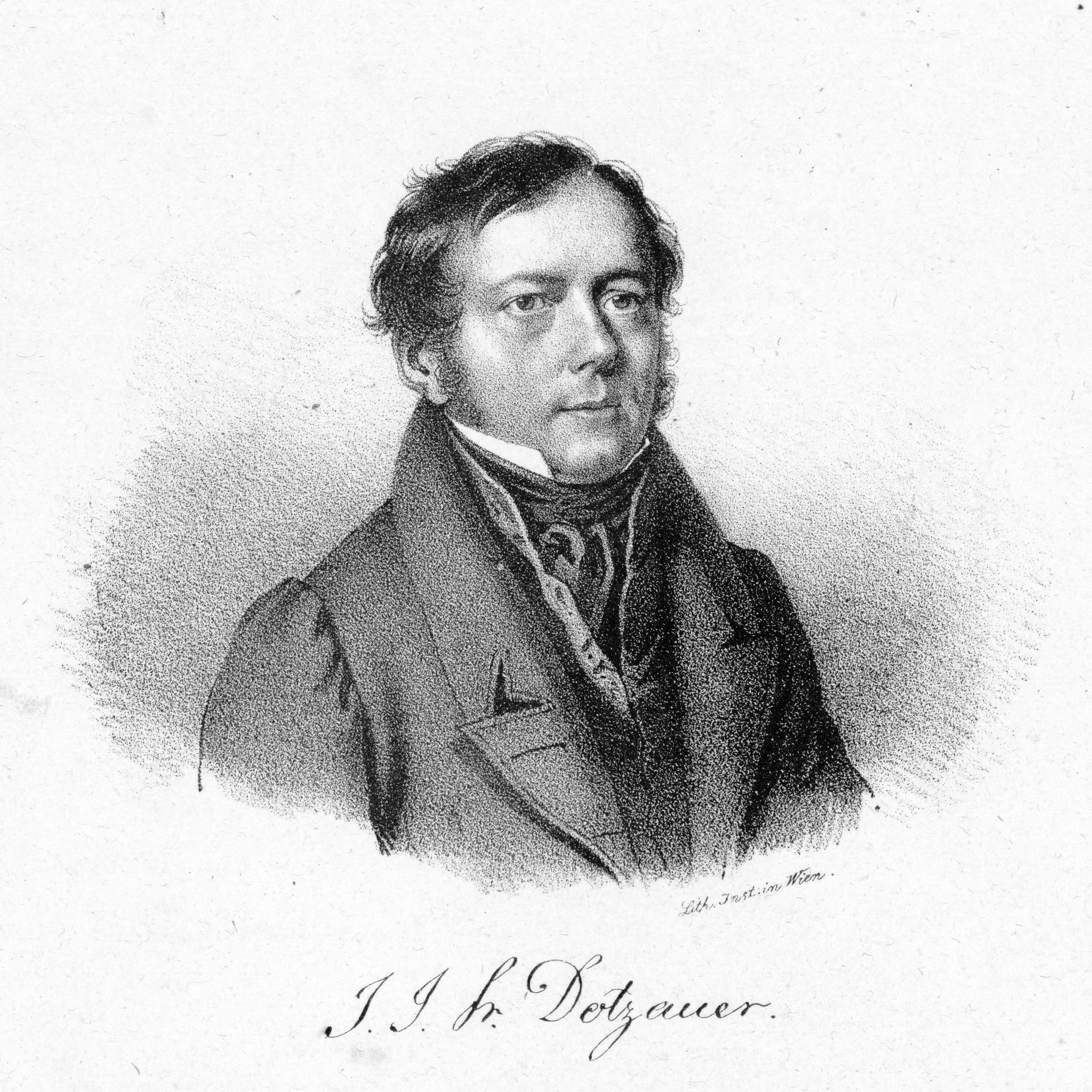
Friedrich Dotzauer

Justus Johann Friedrich Dotzauer (20 January 1783 – 6 March 1860) was a German cellist and composer.

== Life ==
=== Early life and career ===
Dotzauer was born in 1783 in Häselrieth, near Hildburghausen. His father, a pastor, encouraged his interest in music. In early years he played piano, violin and cello, also horn and clarinet, and studied theory and composition with the organist Johann Caspar Rüttinger, a pupil of Johann Christian Kittel. In Meiningen he studied the cello with Johann Jacob Kriegk, Konzertmeister of the Meiningen Court Orchestra; from 1801 Dotzauer was a member of the orchestra.

He moved in 1805 to Leipzig, where he played in the Gewandhaus Orchestra. During this period he visited the cellist Bernhard Romberg in Berlin, who influenced his playing. With Heinrich August Matthaei, Bartolomeo Campagnoli and Johann Georg Hermann Voigt, Dotzauer was a founder of the Gewandhaus Quartet.

=== Dresden ===
In 1811 Dotzauer was appointed cellist of the Dresden Court Orchestra; from 1821 he was principal cellist. During this time in the orchestra he played under Carl Maria von Weber, and later under Richard Wagner, playing in the premieres of Wagner's operas Rienzi and The Flying Dutchman.

He made concert tours of Germany, Austria and the Netherlands. He was a noted teacher, his students including Friedrich August Kummer and Karl Drechsler. His two sons Justus Bernhard Friedrich and Karl Louis became musicians.

Dotzauer remained in the orchestra until retirement in 1850; he died in Dresden in 1860.

== Compositions ==
Dotzauer composed many studies and exercises for solo cello; other compositions include masses and other church music, an opera, 9 cello concertos, and chamber music including string quartets.
