= Werdauer-Greiz Forest =

Forest in Germany

The Werdauer-Greizer forest, also known as the Greiz-Werdauer forest or the Werdauer forest, is the conservation forests around Greiz and Werdau and is one of the largest closed forest areas in Western Saxony and eastern Thuringia.

== Location ==
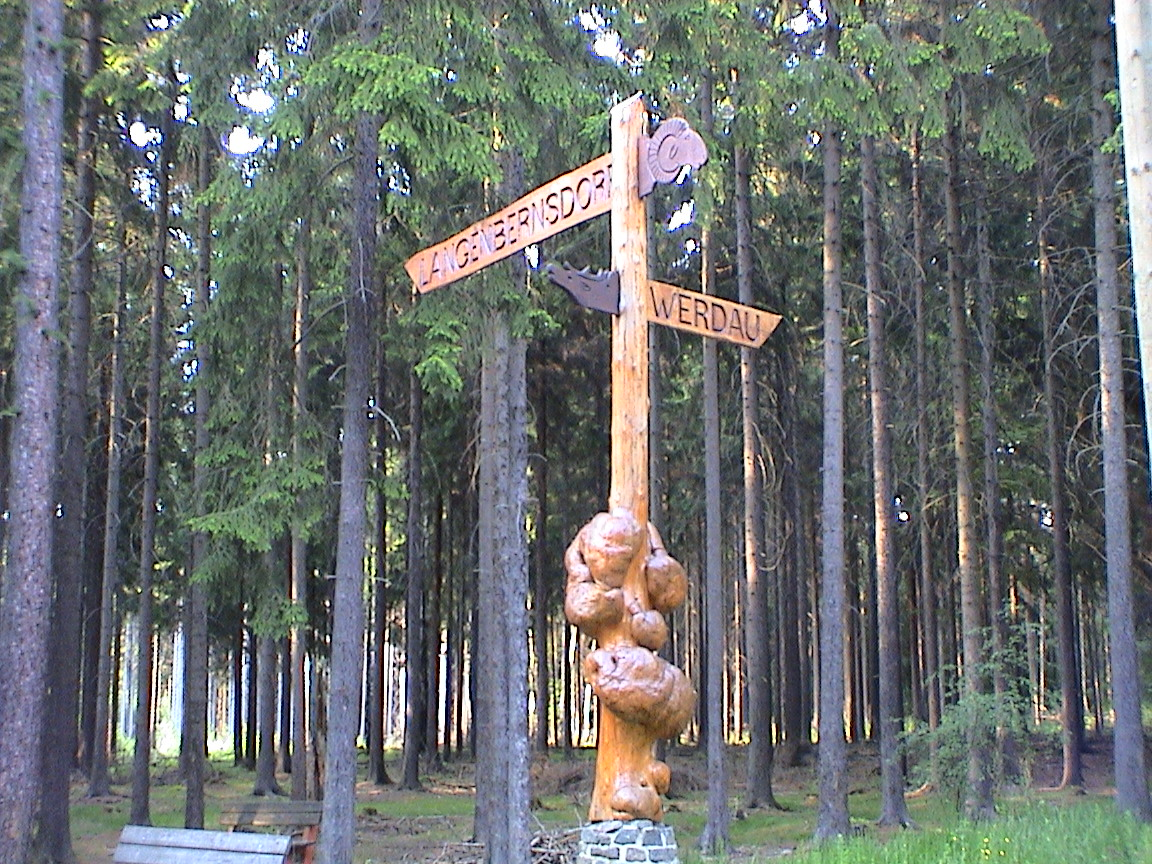
A crossing in the forest

The 62 km² large forested area extends mainly between the valley of the Pleiße and the White Elster. On its northern edge in Thuringia flows the Krebsbach.

The northern spur forms the forest area near the village Trünzig.

West of Greiz the Quirlbach forms a section of the conservation boundary. In the west, the forest area extends beyond the edge of the Elster Valley and ends southeast of the village Daßlitz. The northeastern tip of Werdau with the headwaters of the north adjacent Meiselbach goes into the Leubnitzer Waldsiedlung whose undeveloped area before 1945 still belonged to the Trünzig state forest.

The forest borders the city of Werdau (Saxony) to the northeast and Greiz (Thuringia) to the southwest. In the middle of the forest there is a clearing, where the settlement Waldhaus is located.

The common border of the states of Saxony and Thuringia runs from Teichwolframsdorf going in a north-south direction along a road in the direction of Reudnitz through the forest.

== Conservation area ==
The former Gera district created a conservation area in the Thuringian part of the forest in 1961. The Werdauer forest on the Saxon side was declared a conservation in 1968 by the administration of the former Karl-Marx-Stadt district.

== Gallery ==
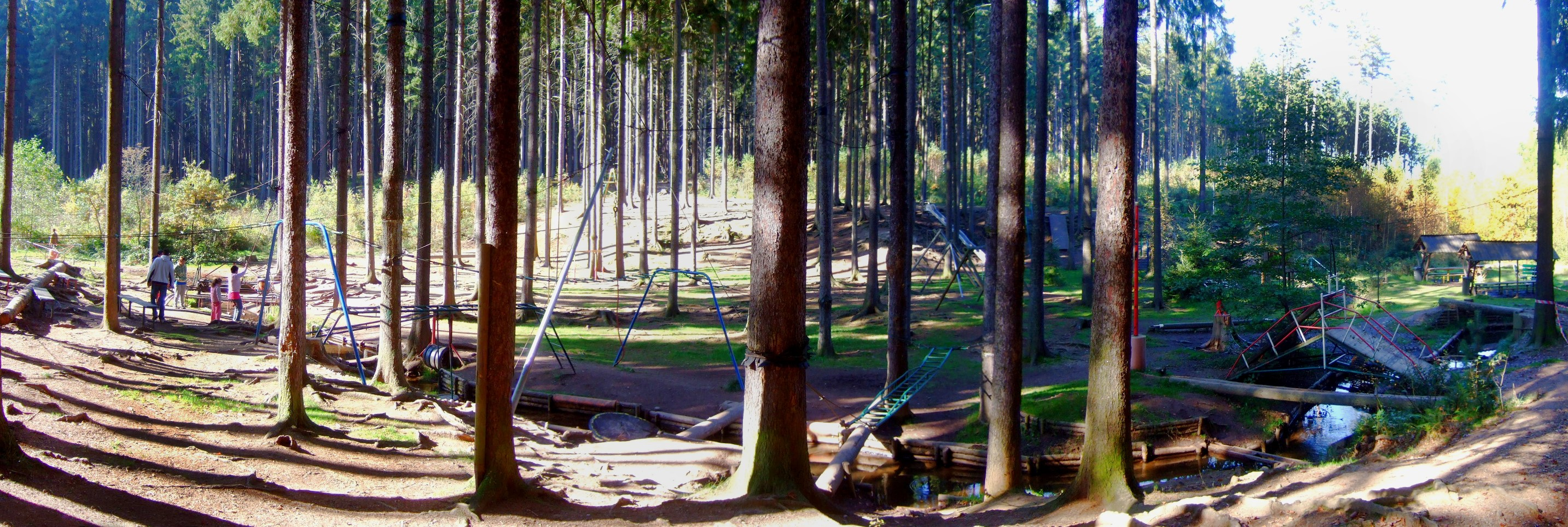
Stöckener Hasenheide

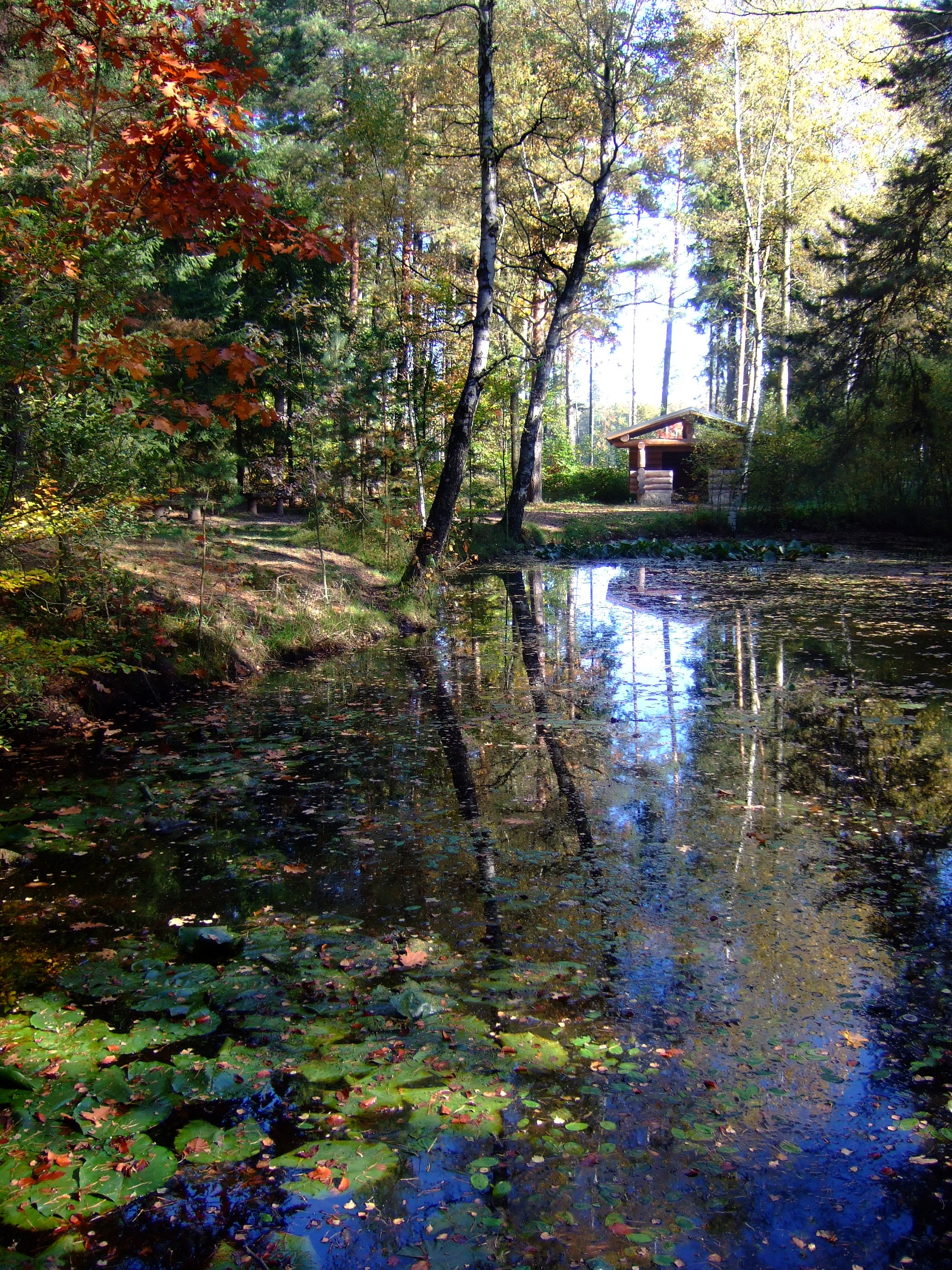
At the water lilly pond

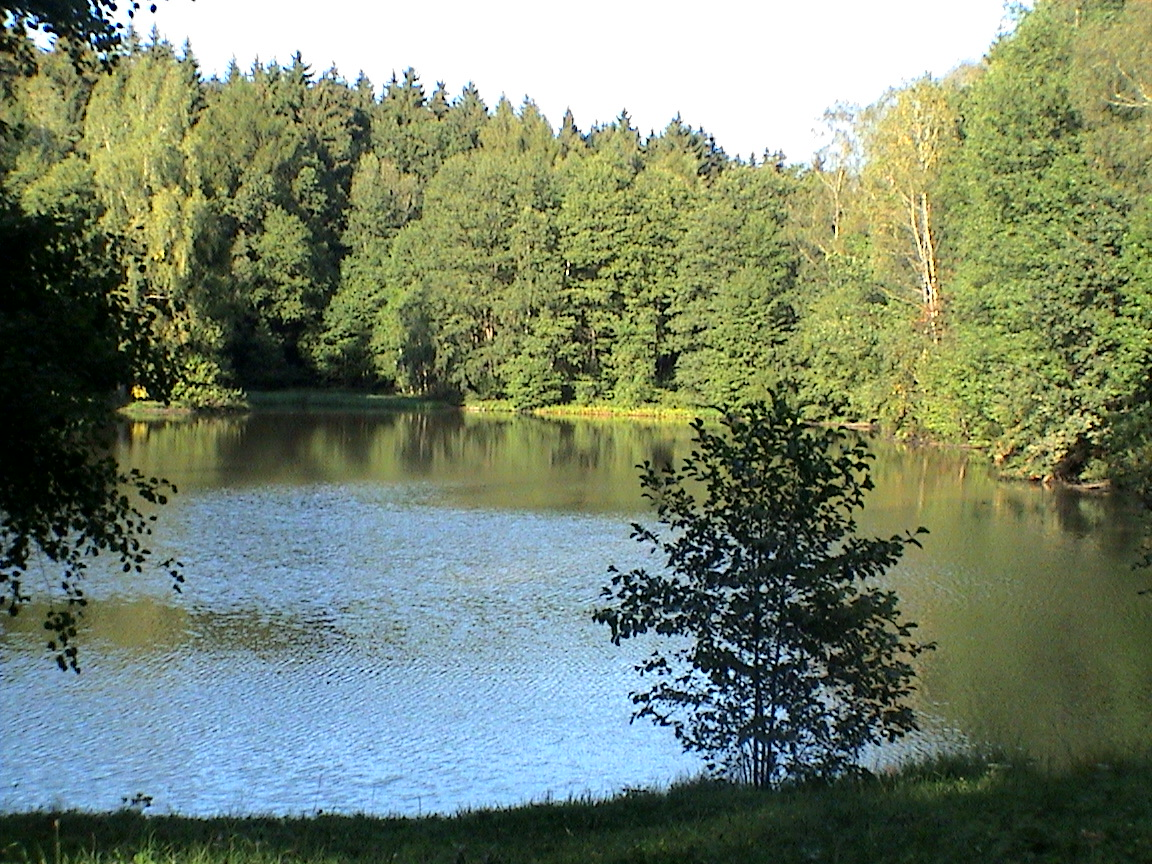
The Schlötenteich in the Schlötengrund near Neumühle

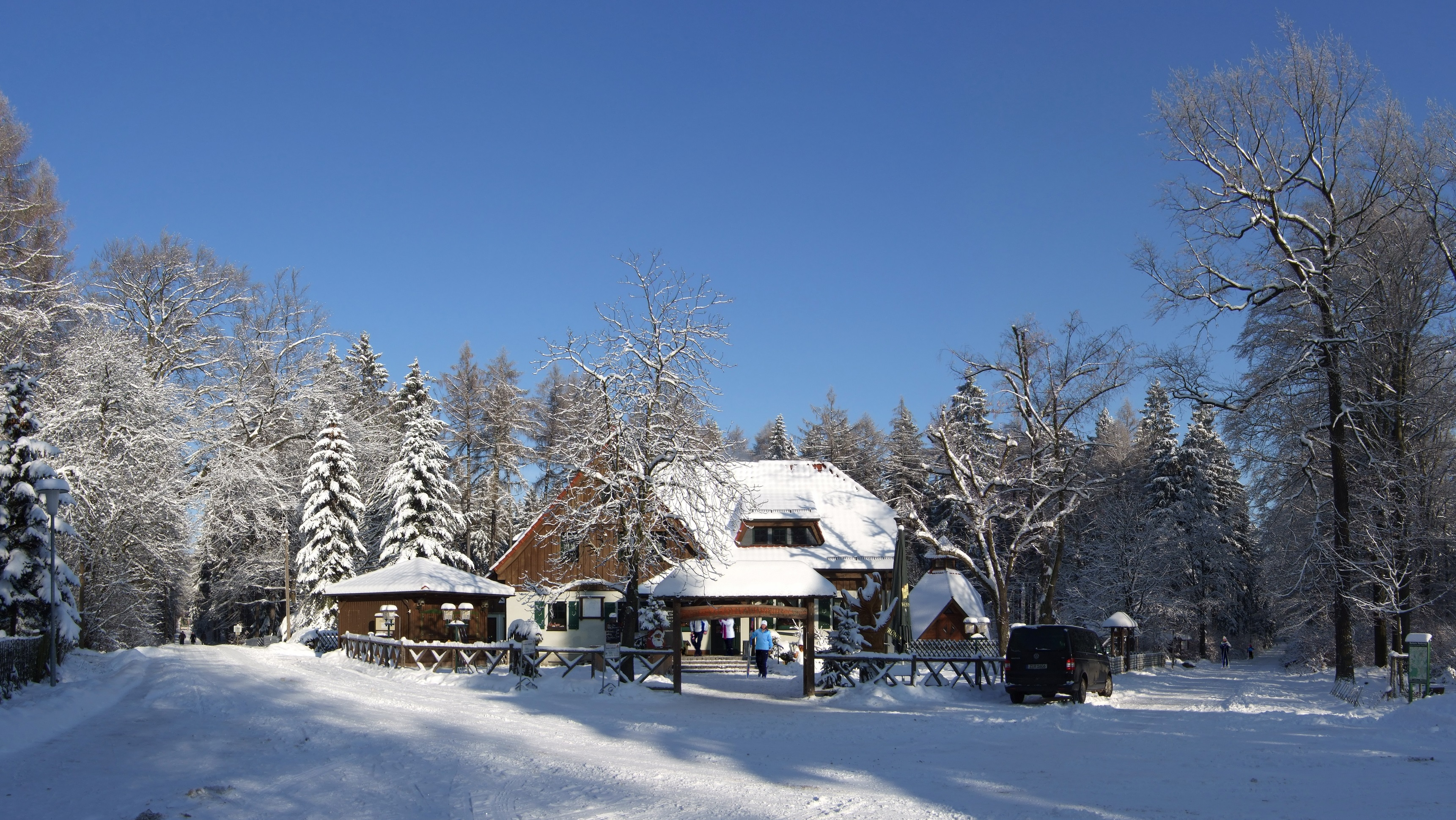
Winter in the Werdauer Forest
