= Haide =

Haide is a given name. Notable people with the given name include:

- Haide Giri (born 1952), Argentine politician
- Haide Klüglein (1939–2020), German swimmer

== See also ==
- Haide (Mohlsdorf-Teichwolframsdorf)
- Haide (song)
