= Amadeus Webersinke =

German pianist and organist

- Born: 1 November 1920; Broumov, Czechoslovakia
- Died: 15 May 2005 (aged 84); Dresden, Germany
- Occupations: Pianist, organist

Amadeus Webersinke (1920–2005) was a German pianist and organist.

The son of a secondary school teacher, he attended high school in Jesenik. Webersinke studied from at the Institut für Kirchenmusik in Leipzig with Karl Straube, Johann Nepomuk David, and Otto Weinreich. He was a lecturer at the Felix Mendelssohn College of Music and Theatre and until 1953, he worked mainly as an organist, and later only as a pianist.

Webersinke was particularly devoted to Bach's organ and piano works and also gave concerts on the clavichord. He recorded Max Reger's Piano Concerto (issued in 1973). In 1966, he assumed a professorship at the Hochschule für Musik Carl Maria von Weber Dresden.

== Awards ==
- First Prize for Organ at the International Johann Sebastian Bach Competition in Leipzig (1950)
- National Prize of the GDR, 3rd Class (1950)
- Robert Schumann Prize of the City of Zwickau (1974)
- Distinguished University Teacher of the GDR (1980)
- Star of People's Friendship in Gold (1988)
- Saxon Order of Merit (2000)

== Bibliography ==
- Gabriele Baumgartner, Dieter Hebig (eds.): *Biographisches Handbuch der SBZ/DDR. 1945–1990.* Vol. 2: *Maassen – Zylla.* K. G. Saur, Munich 1997, ISBN 3-598-11177-0, p. 982.
- Ingo Harden: "Amadeus Webersinke." In: Ingo Harden, Gregor Willmes: *Pianistenprofile: 600 Interpreten: ihre Biografie, ihr Stil, ihre Aufnahmen.* Bärenreiter, Kassel 2008, ISBN 978-3-7618-1616-5, pp. 766–767.
