= Karl Drechsler =

German cellist and educator (1800–1873)

Karl Drechsler (27 June 1800 – 1 December 1873) was a German cellist and teacher.

== Life ==
Drechsler was born in Kamenz, and in 1820 he joined the court chapel in Dessau. He went in 1824 to study with Friedrich Dotzauer in Dresden, and returning to Dessau he received in 1826 the title of Ducal Konzertmeister. He played as a soloist, in a quartet and as player in the orchestra. He retired in 1873, and died later that year in Dresden.

He was said to have a noble, beautiful tone, elegant bowing, clean execution, clear intonation and tasteful presentation. He drew many students to Dessau; these included Bernhard Cossmann, Friedrich Grützmacher and August Lindner.
