= Frank-Michael Erben =

German violinist and conductor

Frank-Michael Erben (born 7 September 1965) is a German violinist and conductor. He is the first concertmaster of the Leipzig Gewandhaus Orchestra and plays the first violin in the Gewandhaus Quartet.

== Life ==
Erben was born in 1965 in Leipzig as the son of the cellist Friedemann Erben and the pianist Mathilde Erben. He received his first violin lessons at the age of five from Klaus Hertel, and from 1972 he was his pupil in the children's class of the Leipzig Academy.

In 1987, at the age of 21, Erben was elected first concertmaster of the Gewandhaus Orchestra. Since 1993 he has also been the first violinist of the Gewandhaus Quartet.

Since the winter semester 2005/06 Erben has held a teaching position at the University of Music and Theatre Leipzig.

From the beginning of the 2009/2010 season until 2014 he was chief conductor of the Leipzig Symphony Orchestra, which performed under the name "Westsächsisches Symphonieorchester" until 2011. He has also been guest conductor of various orchestras, including the Gewandhaus Orchestra and the Royal Scottish National Orchestra.
