= Teichwolframsdorf =

Village in Thuringia, Germany

- Ortsteil of Mohlsdorf-Teichwolframsdorf
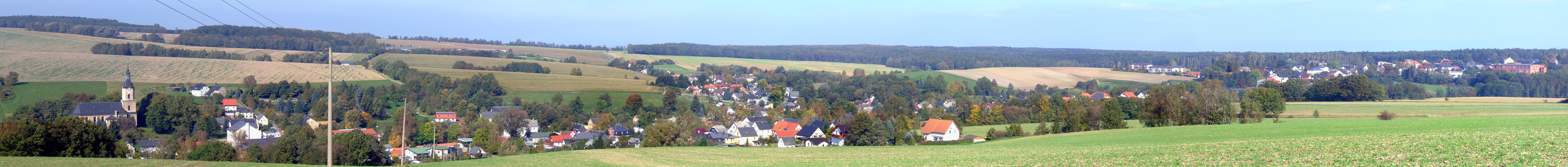
- A view of Teichwolframsdorf

- Coat of arms
- Interactive map of Teichwolframsdorf
- Location within Germany Location within Thuringia
- Coordinates: 50°43′14″N 12°14′49″E
- Country: Germany
- State: Thuringia
- District: Greiz
- Municipality: Mohlsdorf-Teichwolframsdorf
- Subdivisions: 5

Area
  - Total: 26.15 km^{2} (10.10 sq mi)
- Elevation: 320 m (1,050 ft)

Population (2010-12-31)
  - Total: 2,481
  - Density: 94.88/km^{2} (245.7/sq mi)
- Time zone: UTC+01:00 (CET)
  - Summer (DST): UTC+02:00 (CEST)
- Postal codes: 07989
- Dialling codes: 036624
- Vehicle registration: GRZ
- Website: www.teichwolframsdorf.de

Teichwolframsdorf is a village and a former municipality in the district of Greiz, in Thuringia, Germany. Since January 1, 2012, it is part of the municipality Mohlsdorf-Teichwolframsdorf.

== History ==
Within the German Empire (1871-1918), Teichwolframsdorf was part of the Grand Duchy of Saxe-Weimar-Eisenach.
