= Mohlsdorf-Teichwolframsdorf =

- Municipality
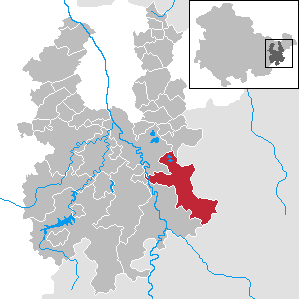
- Location of Mohlsdorf-Teichwolframsdorf within Greiz district
- Interactive map of Mohlsdorf-Teichwolframsdorf
- Location within Germany Location within Thuringia
- Coordinates: 50°40′N 12°16′E
- Country: Germany
- State: Thuringia
- District: Greiz
- Subdivisions: 11

Area
  - Total: 50.45 km^{2} (19.48 sq mi)
- Elevation: 340 m (1,120 ft)

Population (2025-12-31)
  - Total: 4,447
  - Density: 88.15/km^{2} (228.3/sq mi)
- Time zone: UTC+01:00 (CET)
  - Summer (DST): UTC+02:00 (CEST)
- Postal codes: 07987, 07989
- Dialling codes: 03661, 036624
- Vehicle registration: GRZ

Mohlsdorf-Teichwolframsdorf is a municipality in the district of Greiz, in Thuringia, Germany. It was formed on 1 January 2012 by the merger of the former municipalities Mohlsdorf and Teichwolframsdorf.

== Geography ==
The rural community is located in the southeast of the district of Greiz. In the east and south, the municipal boundaries also form part of the border between Thuringia and Saxony. The Werdauer-Greiz Forest is located between the two main towns of the municipality.

=== Neighboring communities ===
To the west, the city of Greiz and the municipality of Neumühle/Elster border Mohlsdorf-Teichwolframsdorf, to the northwest and northeast the town Berga-Wünschendorf and the municipality Seelingstädt. In the east the municipality is bordered by the Zwickau district, the village of Langenbernsdorf, the town of Fraureuth, and the city of Werdau. In the southeast are the Neumark municipality and the city Reichenbach im Vogtland, both part of the Vogtlandkreis.

=== Rural settlement ===
Before their dissolution, the municipality of Mohlsdorf consisted of the districts Gottesgrün with Haide, Herrmannsgrün with Waldhaus, Kahmer, Mohlsdorf and Reudnitz with Eichberg and Neudeck, the municipality of Teichwolframsdorf consisted of the districts Großkundorf, Kleinreinsdorf, Sorge-Settendorf, Teichwolframsdorf with Zaderlehde and Waltersdorf with Rüßdorf.

The parish seat is in Teichwolframsdorf.

== History ==
After the municipal councils of the municipalities of Mohlsdorf and Teichwolframsdorf had taken the decision to dissolve the municipalities and to merge into a single rural municipality, the two mayors signed the territorial change agreement on 13 January 2011. The merger also requested that the contract with the city of Berga, effective from 1 January 2008, be canceled. The project was initially rejected by the Interior Committee of the Landtag of Thuringia. After new advice, the Landtag agreed on 16 December 2011 to the formation of the rural municipality.
