= Gewandhaus Quartet =

String quartet

The Gewandhaus Quartet (German: Gewandhaus-Quartett) is a string quartet based in Leipzig. It was founded in 1808 by members of the Gewandhaus Orchester, as one of the first professional quartets in the world. In its more than 200-year history, they played many world premieres.

== History ==
In 1808, members of the Gewandhaus Orchester formed a string quartet, possibly following the model of the Schuppanzigh Quartet from Vienna, to play quartets mainly by Haydn, Mozart and Beethoven. Since then, it has been formed by concertmasters and players of the orchestra.

== Members ==
The original members were Heinrich August Matthäi (1781–1835), who is considered the quartet's founder, Bartolomeo Campagnoli (1751–1827), who was concertmaster at the time, violist Johann Georg Hermann Voigt (1769–1811) and cellist Friedrich Dotzauer (1783–1860). After Matthäi died in 1835, Ferdinand David (1810–1873) succeeded him, both as quartet primarius and as concertmaster.

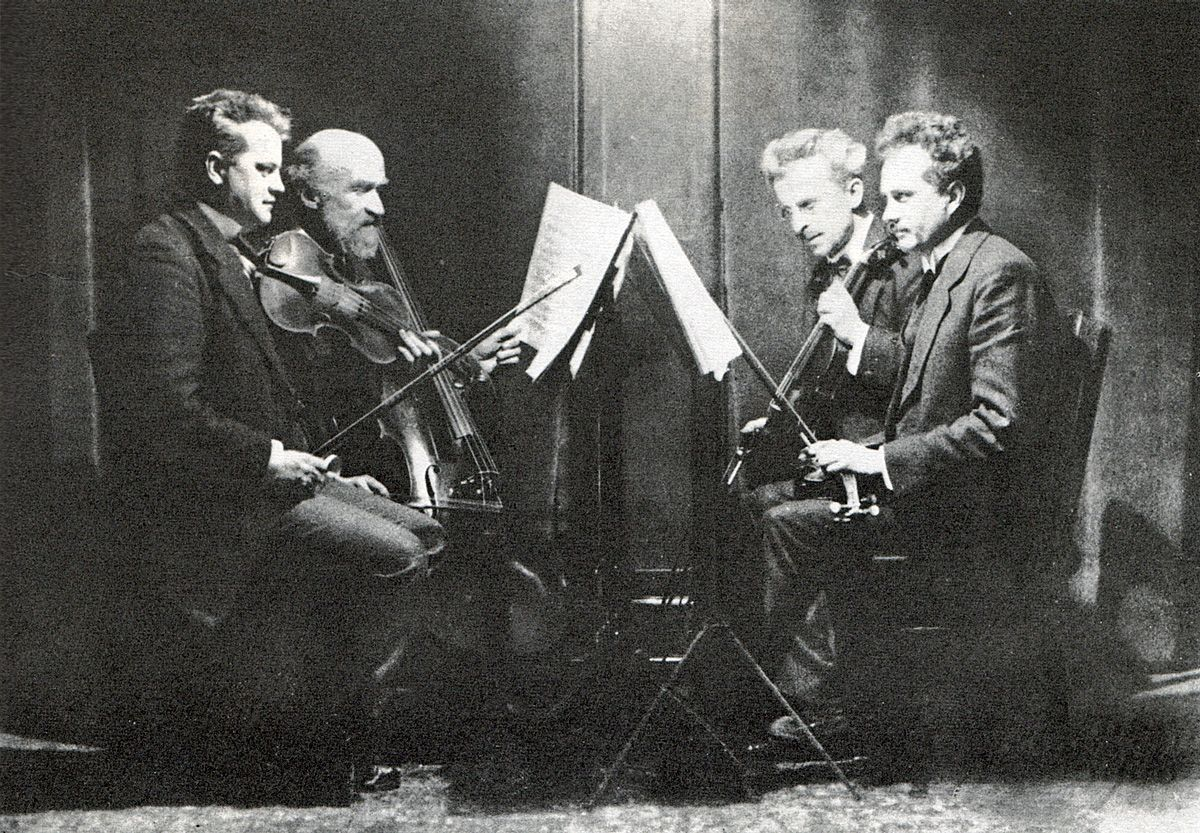
The Gewandhaus Quartet around 1920: Edgar Wollgandt, Carl Wolschke, Carl Herrmann and Julius Klengel

In the course of its 200-year history, which was interrupted only shortly after the Second World War, the quartet had over 100 members. Notable members include Carl Traugott Queisser, Joseph Joachim, Engelbert Röntgen, Julius Klengel, Gerhard Bosse, Karl Suske, and Anton Jivaev.

In addition, the quartet has performed with important other soloists, including Clara Schumann, Johannes Brahms, Edvard Grieg, Felix Mendelssohn Bartholdy, Arthur Nikisch.

As of 2026 the members are:

- Frank-Michael Erben
- Yun Jin Cho
- Vincent Aucante
- Isaac Enders

== Premieres ==
Claudius Böhm, who has researched the history of the quartet, argues that the Gewandhaus Quartet most likely played the world premiere of Beethoven's String Quartet, Op. 74, also Mendelssohn's string quartets, in D major, Op. 32, and in E flat major, Op. 44/3. They probably performed Schumann's String Quartet in A minor Op. 41/1 as well as his Piano Quintet in E flat major, Op. 44, and his Piano Quartet in E flat major, Op. 47. Further premiered compositions were by Niels Gade, Louis Spohr, Ignacy Feliks Dobrzyński, Anton Rubinstein, Max Bruch, Salomon Jadassohn, Ethel Smyth, Felix Weingartner, Hermann Ambrosius, Antonín Dvořák, Siegfried Thiele, Günter Kochan, and others.

== Awards ==
- Preis der deutschen Schallplattenkritik
- Leipzig International Mendelssohn Prize 2014

== Sources ==
- Böhm, Claudius; Gewandhaus zu Leipzig (2008). Das Gewandhaus-Quartett und die Kammermusik am Leipziger Gewandhaus seit 1808 =: Das Gewandhaus-Quartett and the chamber music at Leipzig Gewandhaus since 1808: 1808–2008 (in German). Altenburg: Kamprad. ISBN 978-3-930550-52-4. OCLC 884472848.
