= Heinrich August Matthaei =

German violinist and composer

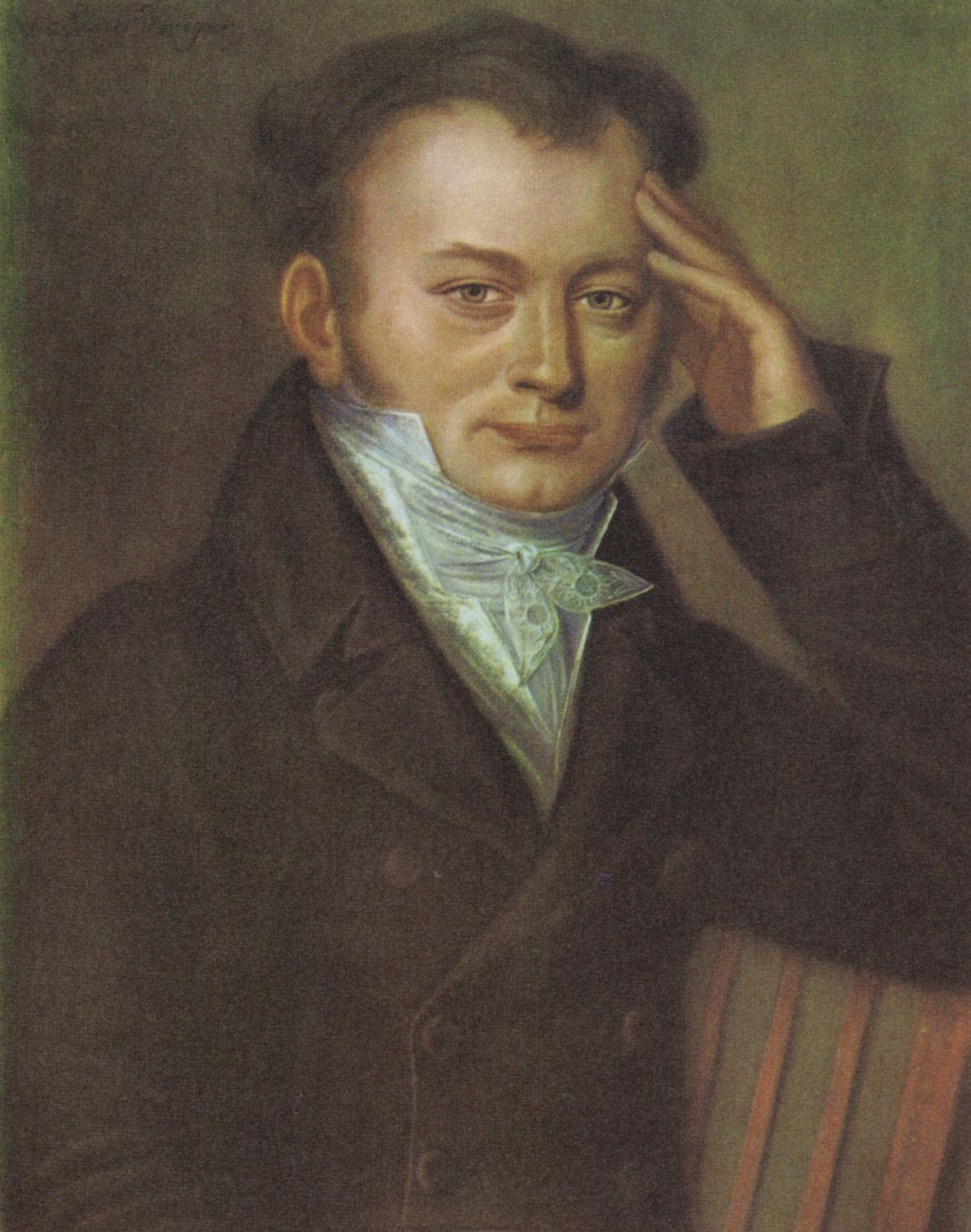
Heinrich August Matthaei, c. 1820

Heinrich August Matthaei (3 October 1781 – 4 November 1835) was a German violinist and composer. He was for many years concertmaster of the Leipzig Gewandhaus Orchestra.

== Life ==
Matthaei was born in Dresden in 1781. Little is known of his early life; it is thought he was largely self-taught as a violinist. In 1803 he arrived in Leipzig, and was appointed as a soloist of the Leipzig Gewandhaus Orchestra, of which the concertmaster was Bartolomeo Campagnoli. Through patrons and friends he had the opportunity to study in Paris, where from 1804 he was a student of Rodolphe Kreutzer.

In 1806 he reappeared in public in Leipzig, and became important there in musical activities. With other members of the Gewandhaus Orchestra – Campagnoli, Johann Georg Hermann Voigt and Friedrich Dotzauer – he founded in 1808 a string quartet, the Gewandhaus Quartet. (The quartet still exists today.) In 1811 Matthaei performed in Berlin, and in 1816 he toured northwest Germany. In 1818 he replaced Campagnoli as concertmaster of the Gewandhaus Orchestra; he held the post until his death in 1835.

Carl Ferdinand Becker, in an obituary, wrote that he "through word and deed, guided many young musicians so excellently" and "revealed to us Beethoven's masterpieces". "The Leipzig orchestra was made famous by Matthaei... Beethoven himself bestowed praise on him."

== Compositions ==
His compositions include four violin concertos (op 2, 9, 15 and 20), Fantasy with Variations for violin and orchestra (op 8), and two string quartets (op 6 and 12).
