= Leipziger Symphonieorchester =

German symphonic orchestra

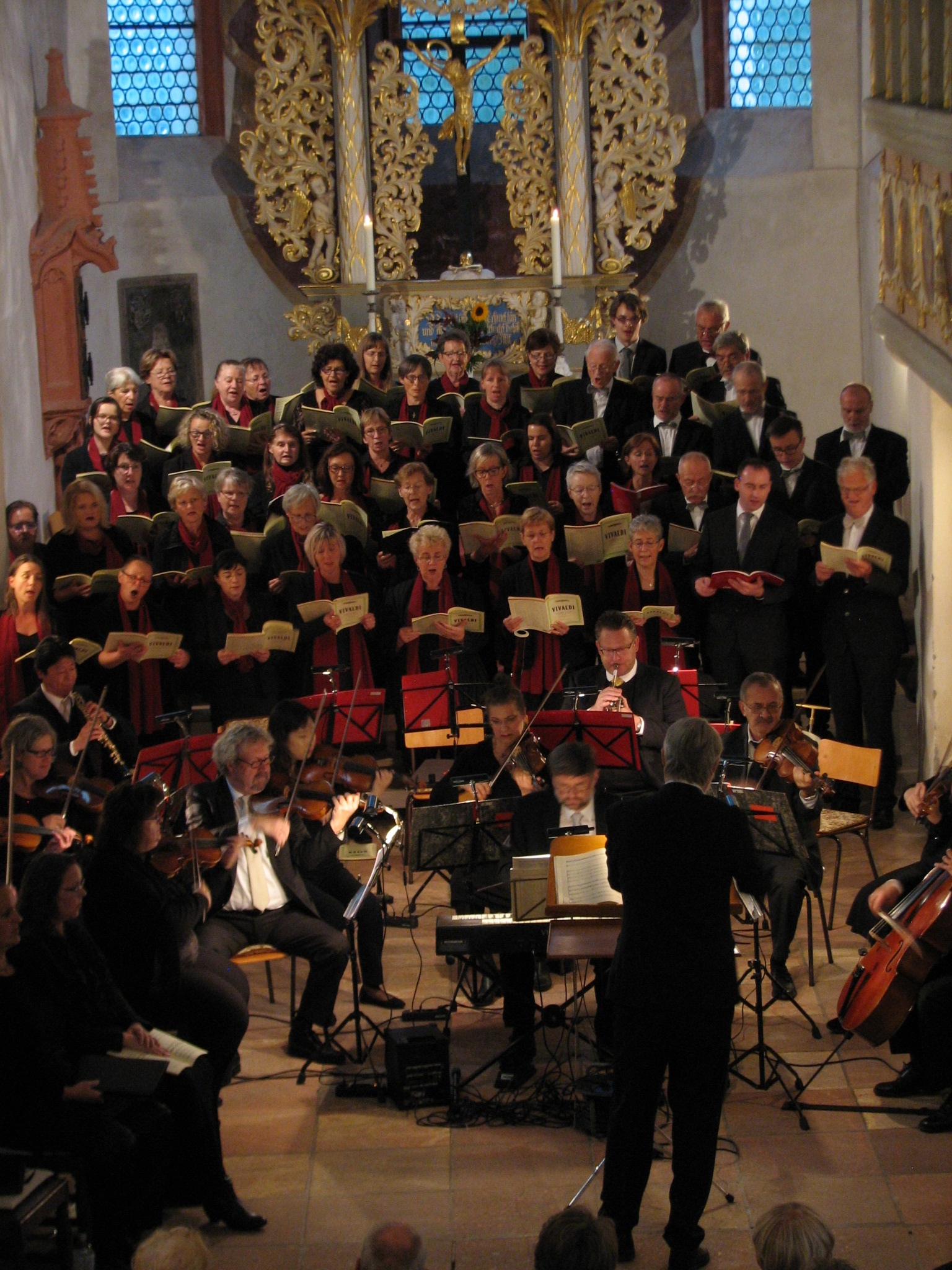
Chorsinfonisches Konzert: Leipziger Symphonieorchester, four soloists and chamber choir in Böhlen on 23 September 2018 in the Stadtkirche Brandis

The Leipziger Symphonieorchester (LSO) is a German symphony orchestra based in the town of Böhlen near Leipzig. It is the symphony orchestra of the districts of Leipzig and Nordsachsen.

== Background and history ==
The orchestra is also supported by the town of Böhlen, where the orchestra has its regular rehearsal and concert venue in the Kulturhaus Böhlen. It was founded in 1963 as the State Orchestra of the Direktionsbezirk Leipzig. Until 2011, it was called the Westsächsisches Symphonieorchester, before that from 1992 to 1997 it was called the Westsächsische Philharmonie. It markets works of symphonic light music under the name of "German Symphonic Pops Orchestra".

The orchestra cooperates closely with the University of Music and Theatre Leipzig and the Hochschule für Musik Franz Liszt, Weimar in the training of future orchestral musicians, singers and conductors. The Leipzig Symphony Orchestra regularly hosts master classes in conducting, such as in 2011 with Vladimir Ponkin (Russia), Kenneth Kiesler (US) and Kurt Masur.

The orchestra's principal conductor in the 2018/19 season was Nicolas Krüger who, however, resigned from his post already in 2019. Previously held this office Karl-Gerhard Seher, Rainer Kluge, Günter Neidlinger, Horst Neumann, Ruben Gazarian (1999–2002), Markus Huber (2003–2009), Frank-Michael Erben (2009–2015) and Wolfgang Rögner (2015–2018).

== Repertoire ==
The repertoire of the orchestra is wide-ranging. It goes from classical-romantic and modern orchestral works to opera, operetta and musical to symphonic light music. Chamber musical ensembles such as the string quartet, the wind quintet and the Blechbläserensemble Saxonia brass complement this extensive range, which has appeared on several CDs.

== Concert activity ==
As the only professional symphony orchestra in the Leipzig cultural region, the Leipzig Symphony Orchestra plays a decisive role in Saxony's musical life with over 100 concerts a year. The orchestra also performs outside the cultural area, for example at the Usedom Music Festival, the Darß Classic Nights, on the flower island of Mainau, at the Berlin Waldbühne and at the Gewandhaus in Leipzig and the Berlin Philharmonie. A long-standing collaboration existed with the Theater an der Rott in Eggenfelden. The orchestra has travelled abroad to Poland, Bulgaria, the Netherlands, Switzerland, Mexico, Italy and South Korea.
