= Neumühle/Elster =

- Stadtteil of Greiz
- Coat of arms
- Interactive map of Neumühle/Elster
- Location within Germany Location within Thuringia
- Coordinates: 50°42′N 12°10′E
- Country: Germany
- State: Thuringia
- District: Greiz
- Town: Greiz

Area
  - Total: 8.43 km^{2} (3.25 sq mi)
- Elevation: 250 m (820 ft)

Population (2018-12-31)
  - Total: 421
  - Density: 49.9/km^{2} (129/sq mi)
- Time zone: UTC+01:00 (CET)
  - Summer (DST): UTC+02:00 (CEST)
- Postal codes: 07980
- Dialling codes: 03661
- Vehicle registration: GRZ
- Website: www.neumuehle-elster.de

Neumühle/Elster (German pronunciation: [ˈnɔʏmyːlə]) is a village and a former municipality in the district of Greiz, in Thuringia, Germany. Since December 2019, it is part of the town Greiz.

== Geography ==
The district is located in the Thuringian Slate Mountains in the valley of the White Elster, which is expanded in the settlement area by several tributaries. These include the Nitschareuther, the Krebsbach and the Schlötenbach, along which the main roads and settlement areas extend.

The city center of Greiz is about 7 kilometers south of the district. East borders the community Mohlsdorf-Teichwolframsdorf with the places Kleinreinsdorf and Waltersdorf. To the west lies Nitschareuth in Langenwetzendorf. These places are located on the plateaus of the White Elster and the valleys of its tributaries.
