= Mohlsdorf =

- Ortsteil of Mohlsdorf-Teichwolframsdorf
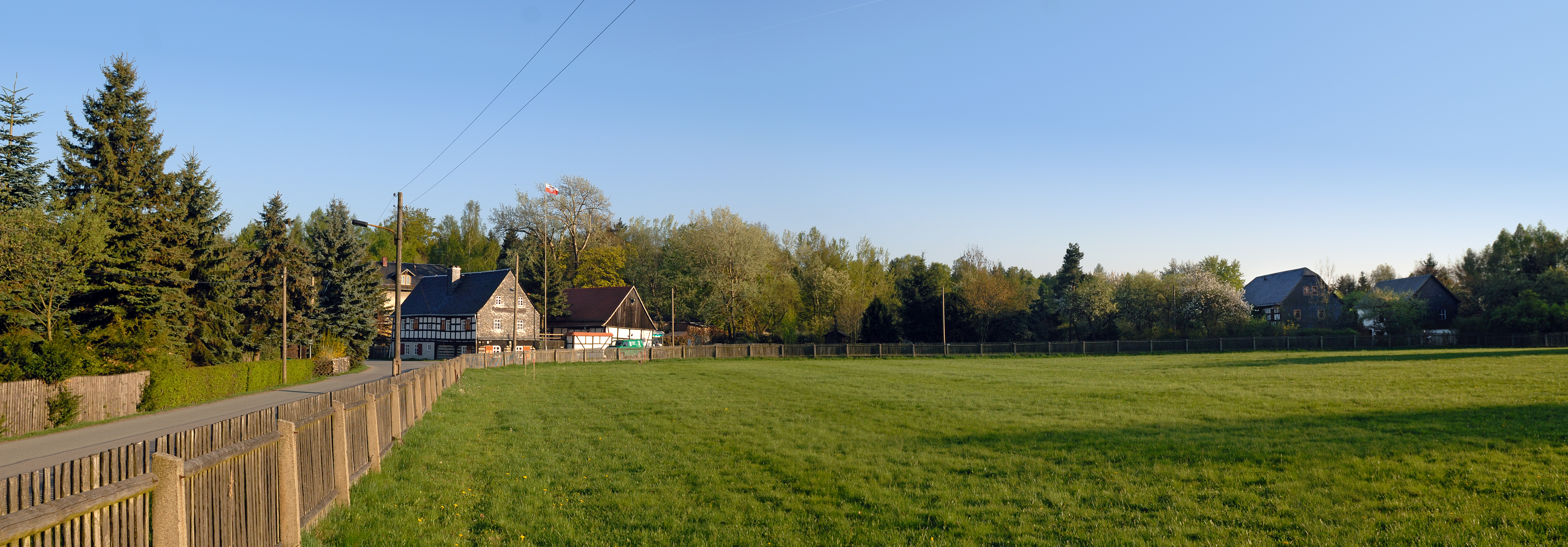
- One of the few houses of Ortsteil Waldhaus
- Interactive map of Mohlsdorf
- Location within Germany Location within Thuringia
- Coordinates: 50°40′N 12°16′E
- Country: Germany
- State: Thuringia
- District: Greiz
- Municipality: Mohlsdorf-Teichwolframsdorf
- Subdivisions: 6

Area
  - Total: 24.30 km^{2} (9.38 sq mi)
- Elevation: 340 m (1,120 ft)

Population (2010-12-31)
  - Total: 2,812
  - Density: 115.7/km^{2} (299.7/sq mi)
- Time zone: UTC+01:00 (CET)
  - Summer (DST): UTC+02:00 (CEST)
- Postal codes: 07987
- Dialling codes: 03661
- Vehicle registration: GRZ
- Website: www.gemeindeverwaltung-mohlsdorf.de

Mohlsdorf is a village and a former municipality in the district of Greiz, in Thuringia, Germany. Since 1 January 2012, it is part of the municipality Mohlsdorf-Teichwolframsdorf.

== See also ==
- Media related to Mohlsdorf at Wikimedia Commons
