= Julius Klengel =

German musician

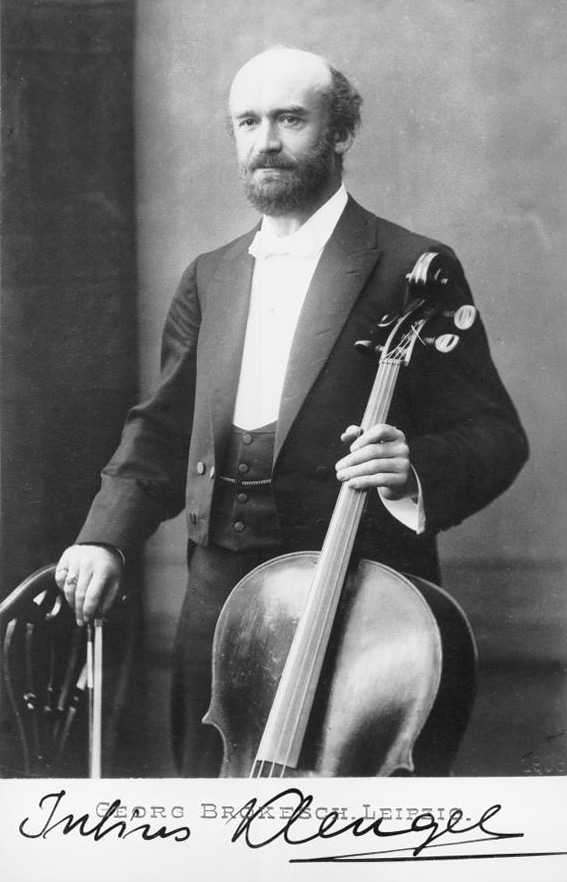
- Julius Klengel (1903)
- Born: 24 September 1859; Leipzig, Kingdom of Saxony
- Died: 27 October 1933 (aged 74); Leipzig, Germany
- Occupations: Cellist; Composer
- Organizations: Gewandhausorchester; Gewandhaus Quartet

Julius Klengel (24 September 1859 – 27 October 1933) was a German cellist who is most famous for his études and solo pieces written for the instrument. He was the brother of Paul Klengel. A member of the Gewandhausorchester of Leipzig at fifteen, he toured extensively throughout Europe as cellist and soloist of the Gewandhaus Quartet. His pupils include Guilhermina Suggia, Emanuel Feuermann, Gregor Piatigorsky and Alexandre Barjansky. See: List of music students by teacher: K to M#Julius Klengel.

== Biography ==
Klengel was born in Leipzig, and studied with Emil Hegar in his youth. His father was a lawyer and an amateur musician, and was a friend of Mendelssohn. After his 15th birthday, Klengel joined the Leipzig Gewandhaus Orchestra where Klengel played first cello, and began touring in Europe and Russia. Klengel also became a soloist at that point, frequently giving solo performances.

Klengel rose to become principal cellist of the orchestra, aged 22, in 1881. There he remained for over four decades: to celebrate his fifty years of service, Wilhelm Furtwängler conducted a jubilee concert, in which Klengel played the cello part in a double concerto he composed for the occasion. During that time period, Klengel became professor at the Leipzig Conservatory, where he was briefly a member of Adolph Brodsky's string quartet, and began composing. He ultimately composed hundreds of pieces for the cello, including four cello concertos, two double cello concertos, cello quartets, a cello sonata, as well as numerous caprices, etudes and other technical pieces. Of his music, the two volumes of etudes ("Technical Studies") for cello remain in the repertory; three concertos were recorded in 2000 by Christoph Richter and NDR Radiophilharmonie under Bjarte Engeset.

His students included Guilhermina Suggia, Hideo Saito, Emanuel Feuermann, Paul Grümmer, William Pleeth, and Gregor Piatigorsky. He died in October 1933 in his hometown of Leipzig.

== Musical works ==
- Capriccio, Op. 3
- Cello Concerto No. 1 in A minor, Op. 4
- Two Pieces for four cellos, Op. 5

- Serenade
- Humoresque

- Scherzo for cello and piano, Op. 6
- Concertino No.1 in C major, Op. 7
- Concert Piece in D minor for cello and piano, Op. 10
- Mazurka No. 3 for cello and piano, Op.14
- Variations for four cellos, Op. 15
- Suite in D minor for two cellos, Op. 22
- Serenade in F major, Op. 24
- Caprice for cello and piano, Op. 27
- Theme with Variations for four cellos, Op. 28
- Impromptu for four cellos, Op. 30
- Cello Concerto No. 3, Op. 31
- Four Pieces for four cellos, Op. 33
  - Song without Words
  - Gavotte
  - Lullaby
  - March
- Piano Trio No. 2 (children's), Op. 35
  - Kindertrio No. 1 in C major
  - Kindertrio No. 2 in G major
- Cello Concerto No. 4 in B minor, Op. 37
- Piano Trio No. 1 (children's), Op. 39
  - Kindertrio No. 1 in F major
  - Kindertrio No. 2 in D major
- Suite No. 2 in A minor for cello and piano, Op. 4
- Concertino No. 2 in G major for cello and piano, Op. 41
- Caprice in the Form of a Chaconne after a Theme by Schumann for solo cello, Op. 43
- Double Concerto in E minor for two cellos, Op. 45
- Concertino No. 3 in A minor for cello and piano, Op. 46
- Six Sonatinas for cello and piano, Op. 47
- Six Sonatinas for cello and piano, Op. 48
- Andante Sostenuto for cello and orchestra, Op. 51
- Suite for cello and organ, Op. 54
- Suite for cello in D minor, Op. 56
- Hymnus for 12 cellos, Op. 57
- Small Suite for three cellos, Op. 59
- Concerto for violin, cello and orchestra, Op. 61
- Three Pieces for two cellos and piano (organ), Op. 62

== Works without Opus number ==
- Tägliche Übungen, Vol. I
- Tägliche Übungen, Vol. II
- Tägliche Übungen, Vol. III
- Technische Studien [durch alle Tonarten] für Violoncello or Technical Cello Studies, 1906.
