= Lippische Mitteilungen aus Geschichte und Landeskunde =

German academic journal

- Discipline: History
- Language: German

Publication details
- History: 1903-present
- Publisher: Verlag für Regionalgeschichte
- Frequency: Annually

Standard abbreviations
- ISO 4: Lipp. Mitt. Gesch. Landeskd.

Indexing
- ISSN: 0342-0876
- OCLC no.: 643770639

Links
- Journal homepage

The Lippische Mitteilungen aus Geschichte und Landeskunde (in short: Lippische Mitteilungen) is an annual academic journal covering all aspects of the history of the former Land Lippe, respectively the present Kreis Lippe and its historical development and integration in the region Ostwestfalen-Lippe and the Weser Uplands. It is the official journal of the Naturwissenschaftlicher und Historischer Verein für das Land Lippe. From 1903 till 2008 it was published by the association. Since 2009, the journal has been published by the Verlag für Regionalgeschichte.
