= Edgar Wollgandt =

German violinist

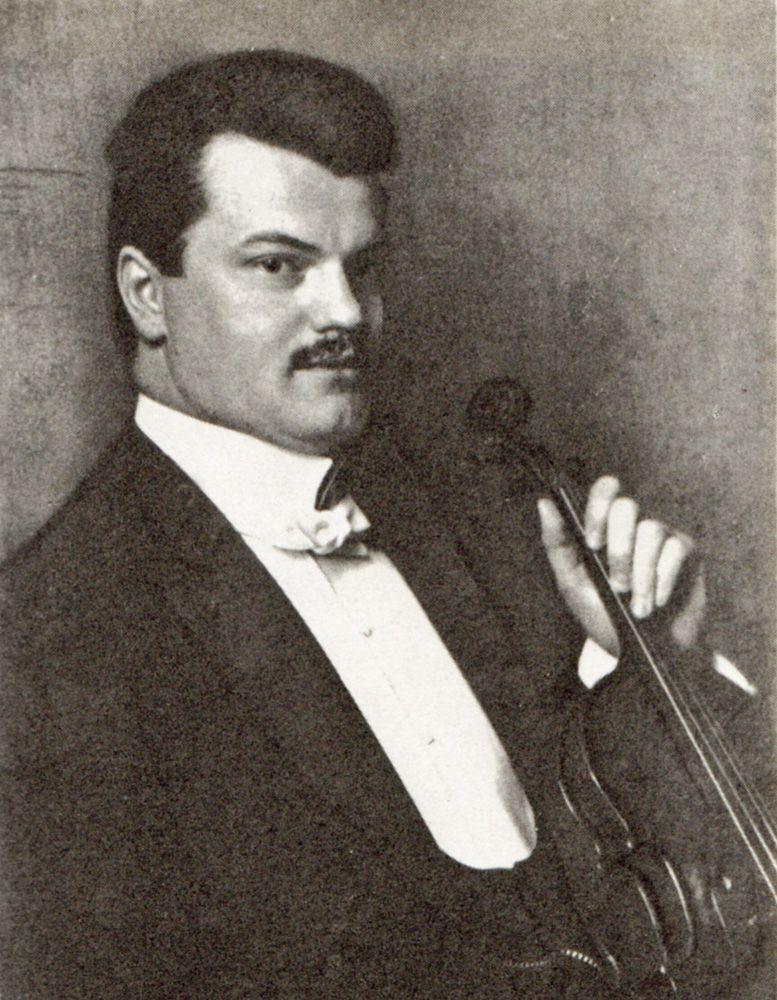
Edgar Wollgandt, circa 1905

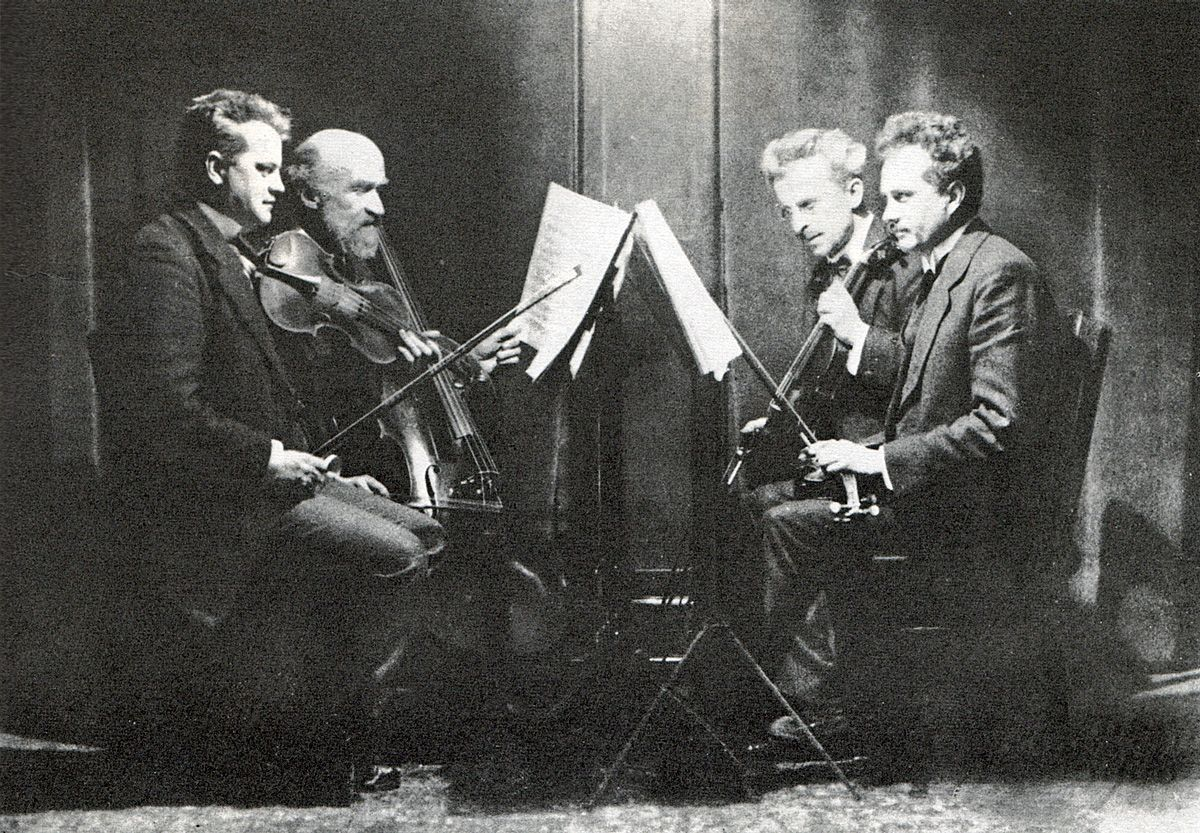
Edgar Wollgandt (li.) with the Gewandhaus Quartet (circa 1920)

Edgar Wollgandt (18 July 1880 in Wiesbaden – 25 December 1949) was a German violinist.

== Life ==
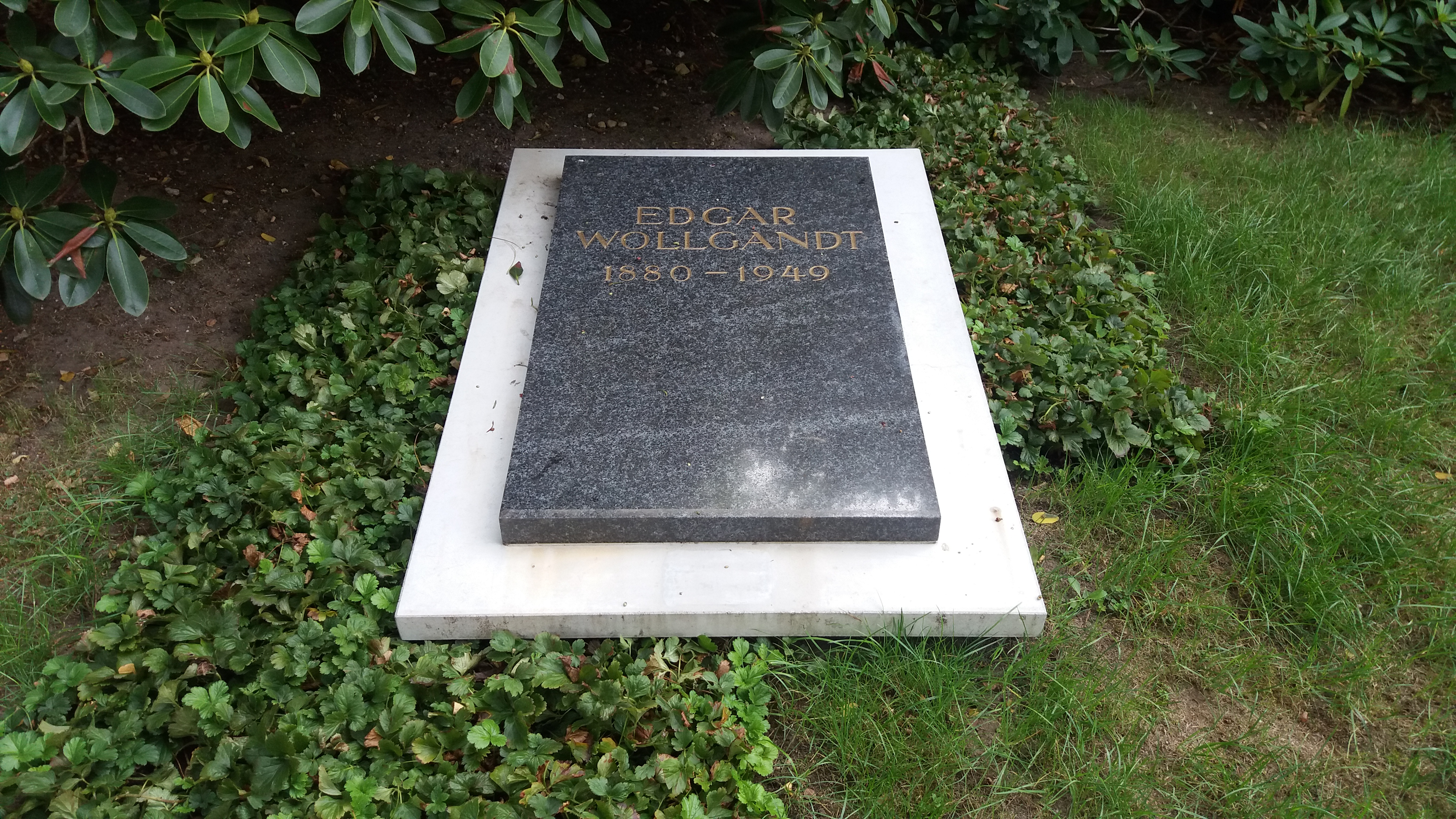
Wollgandt's grave (2011)

His father was the bassoonist and royal chamber musician Adelhardt Wollgandt. After attending a secondary school in Wiesbaden, Wollgandt first did his military service as a one-year volunteer. He studied at the Wiesbaden Conservatory until 1897, then from 1897 to 1900 he studied violin at the Hoch Conservatory in Frankfurt with Hugo Heermann. At the same time he played in the Frankfurter Opern- und Museumsorchester.

From 1900 to 1903 he was engaged at the Hannoversche Hofkapelle and in 1901 became principal violinist and deputy concertmaster there. In the same year he was appointed Royal chamber musician. In 1901, 1902, 1908, 1909, 1911, 1912, 1930, 1931, 1933, 1934 and 1936-44 he was a member of the Bayreuth Festival orchestra. In 1903 he became First concert master of the Gewandhausorchester and primarius of the Gewandhaus Quartet, a position he held until 1941. In 1916 he was called up for military music service with the Reserve Infantry Regiment 107 in Borna.

In 1928 he got a professorship and taught at the Staatliche Hochschule für Theater und Musik Halle. In 1941 he became teacher for violin at the University of Music and Theatre Leipzig. Among his students were Gerhard Bosse and Arnold Matz.

From 1906 Wollgandt was married to Käthe Nikisch, the daughter of the actress Amélie Nikisch and the conductor Arthur Nikisch. Wollgandt died in Halla at the age of 69 and is buried at the Südfriedhof in Leipzig.

== Literature ==
- Friedrich Frick: Kleines Biographisches Lexikon der Violinisten. Vom Anfang des Violinspiels bis zum Beginn des 20. Jahrhunderts. Norderstedt 2009, ISBN 978-3-8370-3907-8, p. 578.
- Hans-Rainer Jung, Claudius Böhm: Das Gewandhaus-Orchester. Seine Mitglieder und seine Geschichte seit 1743. Faber & Faber, Leipzig 2006, ISBN 978-3-936618-86-0, p. 184 f.
