= Dieter Hebig =

German archivist and historian

Dieter Hebig (born 23 February 1957) is a German archivist and historian.

== Life ==
Born in Heilbad Heiligenstadt, Hebig comes from the Thuringian region of Eichsfeld. After attending school, he completed a vocational training with a high school diploma as a mechanic for data processing and office machines. During this time, Hebig was already involved in voluntary work for the preservation of floors and monuments. After one year as a museum guide in Kloster Veßra, he studied archaeology and history for five years at the Humboldt-University of Berlin. He completed his studies in 1982 with Botho Brachmann as a graduate archivist.

He then became a research assistant at the Staatliche Archivverwaltung (State Archive Administration) at the Ministry of the Interior of the GDR in Potsdam. His last position there was chief editor of the journal Archivmitteilungen for theory and practice of archiving. In 1991, Hebig was also affected by the dissolution of the State Archive Administration, which had meanwhile been transformed into the Central Archive Office of the GDR.

He then became self-employed and operated the company Archiv-Service Potsdam until 2007. Since then, Hebig has been working for the company Schempp Bestandserhaltung GmbH in Kornwestheim. There, he is head of the departments of conservation and damage restoration as well as protective packaging for cultural property.

== Work ==
- 1000 Jahre deutsche Geschichte: Dokumente aus Archiven der DDR.
- "Das 'Manuscriptum Nawense' im Staatsarchiv Potsdam – einer der ältesten Papiercodices im Gebiet der feudalen deutschen Ostexpansion." In Jahrbuch für Geschichte des Feudalismus, vol. 9, Berlin, 1985, pp. 129–143.
- "Mittelalterliche Wehranlagen in Südwestthüringen – Grundzüge ihrer Entwicklung und Funktion." In Jahrbuch für Regionalgeschichte, vol. 15, 1988, pp. 234–243.
- Zur Herausgabe der Methodischen Richtlinien zur Bewertung von dienstlichem Schriftgut. In Archivmitteilungen 38 (1988), pp. 160–162.
- with Gabriele Baumgartner (ed.): Biographisches Handbuch der SBZ/DDR. 1945–1990. Vol. 1: Abendroth – Lyr. K. G. Saur Verlag, Munich 1996, ISBN 3-598-11176-2.
- with Gabriele Baumgartner (ed.): Biographisches Handbuch der SBZ/DDR. 1945–1990. Vol. 2: Maassen – Zylla. K. G. Saur, Munich 1997, ISBN 3-598-11177-0.
