= Haide (Mohlsdorf-Teichwolframsdorf) =

Hamlet in Germany

Coordinates: 50.669368°N 12.292682°E

Haide is a hamlet in the municipality of Mohlsdorf-Teichwolframsdorf in the Greiz district of Thuringia, southwest of the hamlet Gottesgrün, located on the Neumark–Greiz railway. The residential area consists of two farmsteads and three other residential buildings.
