= Greiz =

Town in Germany

- Town
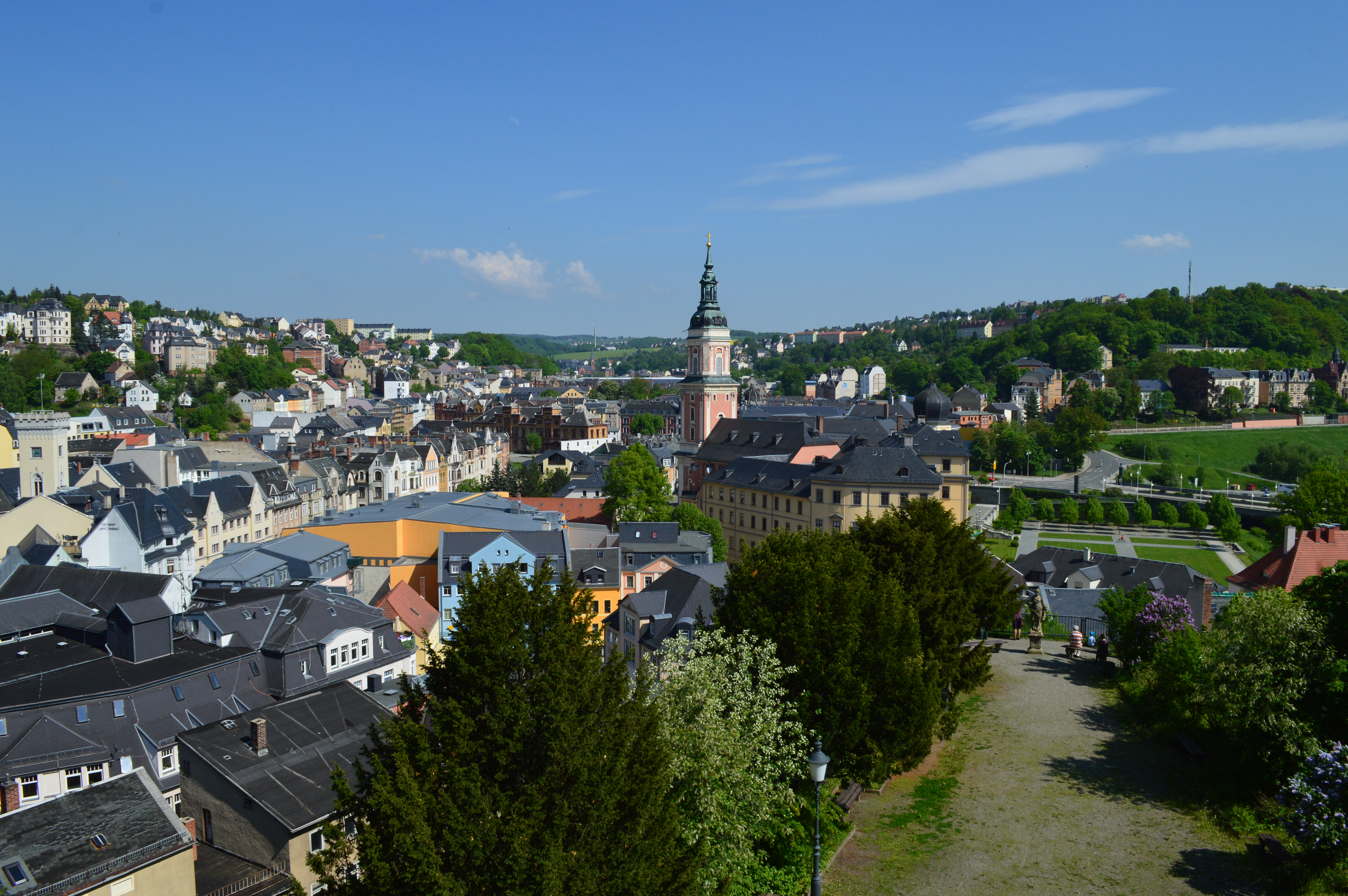
- Greiz, Thuringia

- Coat of arms

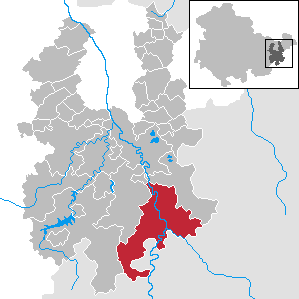
- Location of Greiz within Greiz district
- Interactive map of Greiz
- Location within Germany Location within Thuringia
- Coordinates: 50°39′17″N 12°11′59″E
- Country: Germany
- State: Thuringia
- District: Greiz
- Subdivisions: 10

Government
  - Mayor (2024–30): Alexander Schulze (CDU)

Area
  - Total: 84.87 km^{2} (32.77 sq mi)
- Elevation: 265 m (869 ft)

Population (2025-12-31)
  - Total: 19,766
  - Density: 232.9/km^{2} (603.2/sq mi)
- Time zone: UTC+01:00 (CET)
  - Summer (DST): UTC+02:00 (CEST)
- Postal codes: 07973
- Dialling codes: 03661
- Vehicle registration: GRZ, ZR
- Website: www.greiz.de

Greiz (/ɡraɪts/ gryts; German pronunciation: [ɡʁaɪts]) is a town in the state of Thuringia, Germany, and is the capital of the district of Greiz. Greiz is situated in eastern Thuringia, 100 kilometres (62 miles) east of the state capital Erfurt, on the White Elster river.

Greiz has a large park in its centre (Fürstlich Greizer Park) which is classified as an English garden. Thomasstraße, Burgstraße, Marktstraße, Waldstraße, and Leonhardtstraße, with their Jugendstil houses, are well-known examples of that architectural style.

== History ==
As with other nearby settlements, the place name (originally Grouts) is of Slavic origin and means gord. The first documented mention of the settlement dates from 1209. The prime location of Greiz on the confluence of the White Elster river and its tributary Göltzsch helped to make it a fast-growing town. From the 12th century it was governed by advocati (Vögte), but in 1236 it came into the possession of Gera. It was recognized as a town in the 13th century. Later the House of Reuss, a ruling German dynasty whose male members were all named Heinrich, built two castles in Greiz: the "Oberes Schloss" (Upper Castle) and the "Unteres Schloss" (Lower Castle). Both were built by famous architects and are still considered unique. Greiz became the capital of the Principality of Reuss-Greiz until 1918.

The town was wholly destroyed by fire in 1494, and almost totally in 1802.

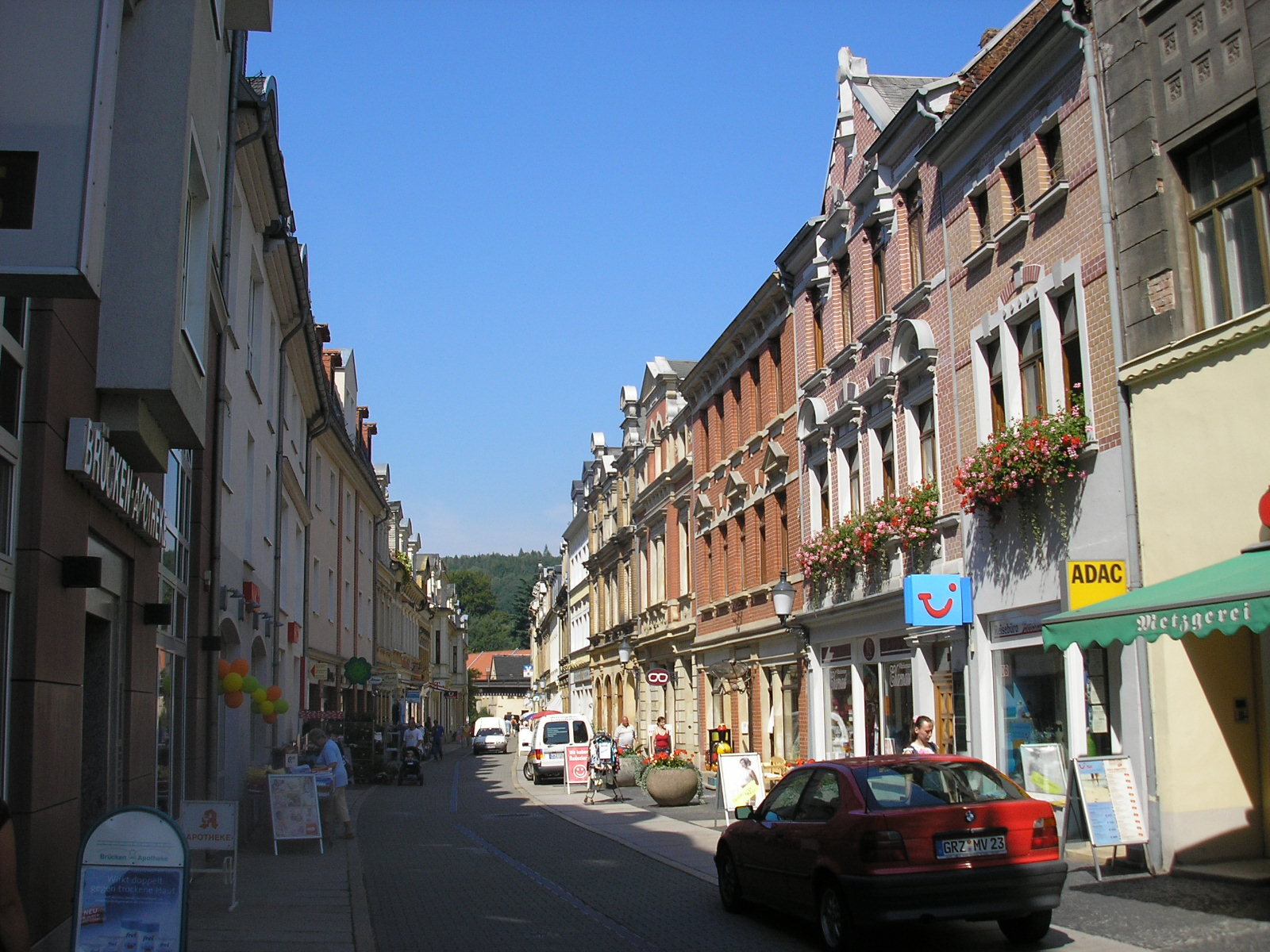
Greiz town center

Between 1934 and 1943, 809 people were forcibly sterilized by Nazis in the district hospital in Wichmannstraße. The local old folk's home and the care home submitted 122 sick people to the euthanasia program Aktion T4.

During World War II hundreds of prisoners of war as well as men and women from countries occupied by Nazi Germany worked as forced laborers in Sorgwald near Thalbach, a village about 2 km south-east of Greiz and in other enterprises. At least 102 of them died. There is a memorial for them in the Old Cemetery.

There is also a monument to the officer Kurt von Westernhagen, who refused orders in April 1945 to blow up the bridge and defend the town, for which he was shot by the Gestapo.

During World War II, Greiz did not suffer much damage, although 3 of the 5 bridges in town were destroyed. Ulf Merbold, who became the first astronaut from West Germany in 1983, was born here in 1941.

Greiz has a population of about 20,400 people. The former municipality Neumühle/Elster was merged into Greiz in December 2019.

== Economy ==
In addition to a chemical works and a disused paper factory, there are mechanical engineering operations, plastics manufacturing businesses, wood machining enterprises, medical technology, suppliers to the automobile industry, printing houses, and breweries. In recent years various high-tech businesses (sensor technology, climate simulators, micro-chip production) and environmental technology companies have been developed.

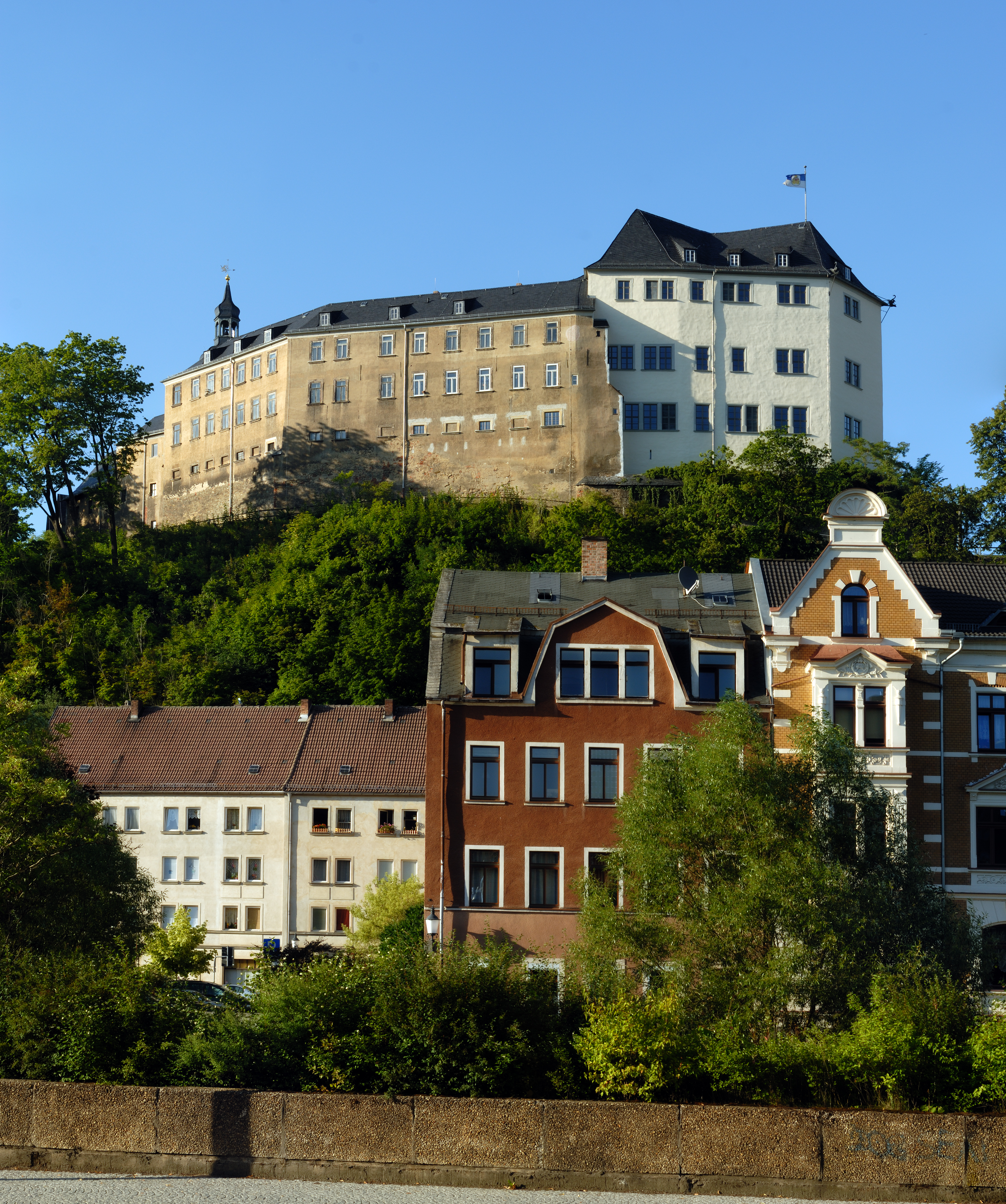
Upper Castle

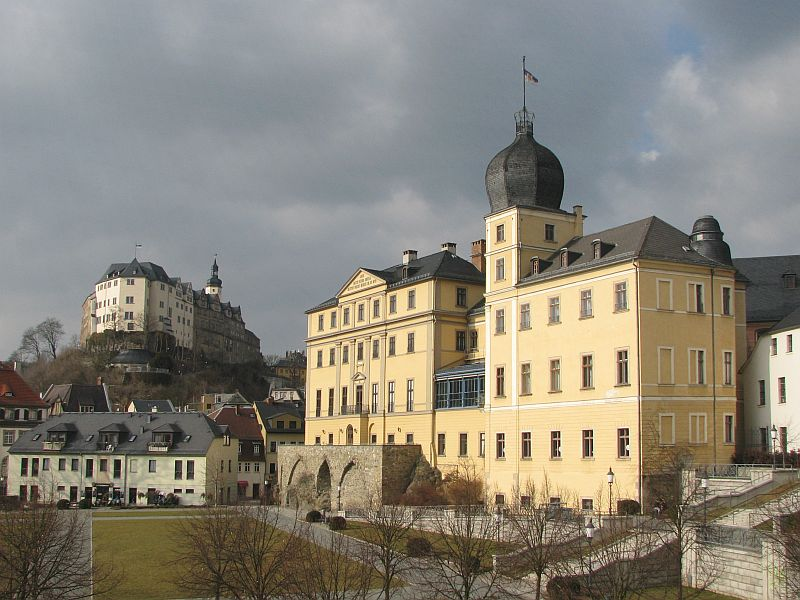
Upper and Lower castles

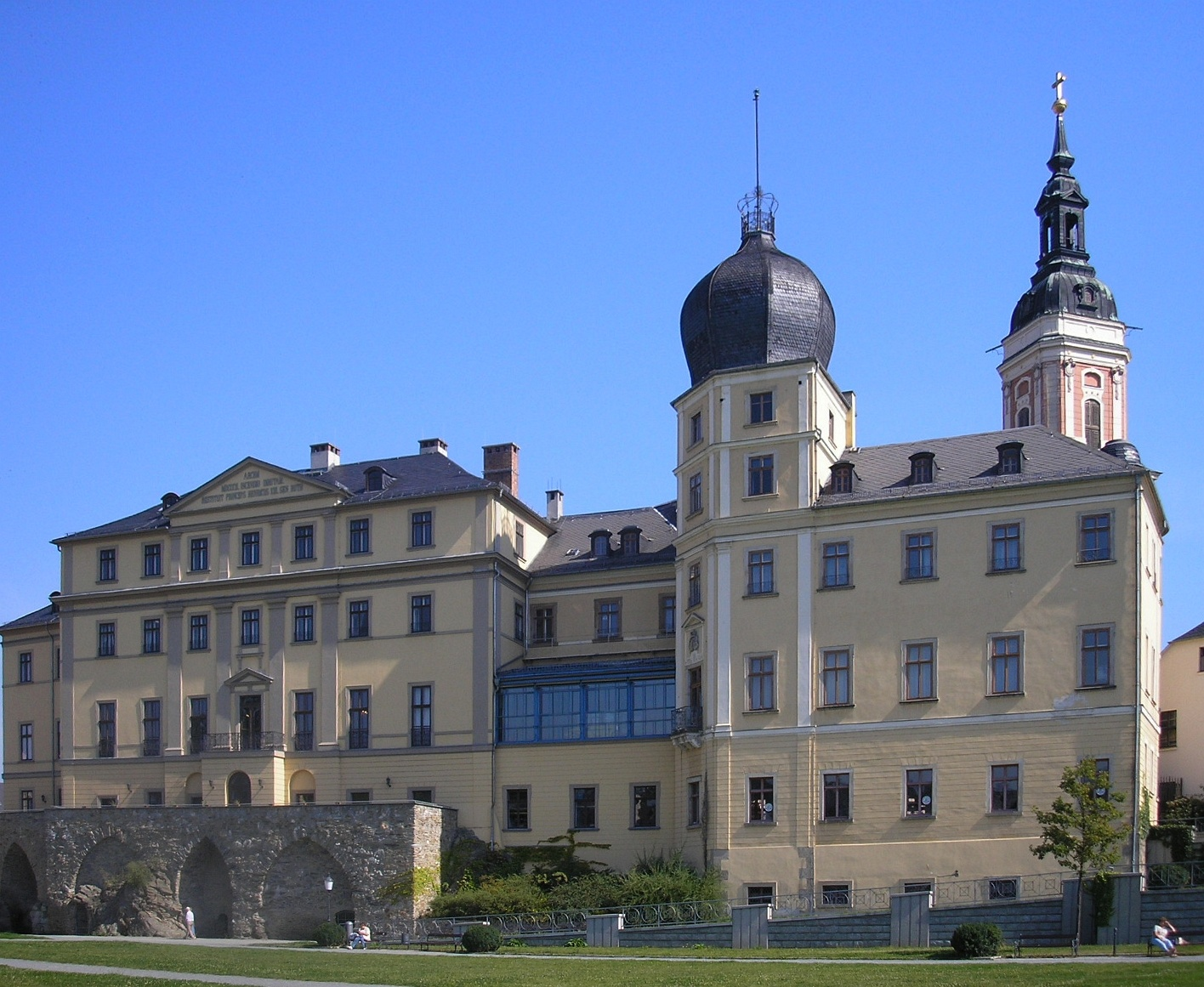
Lower Castle

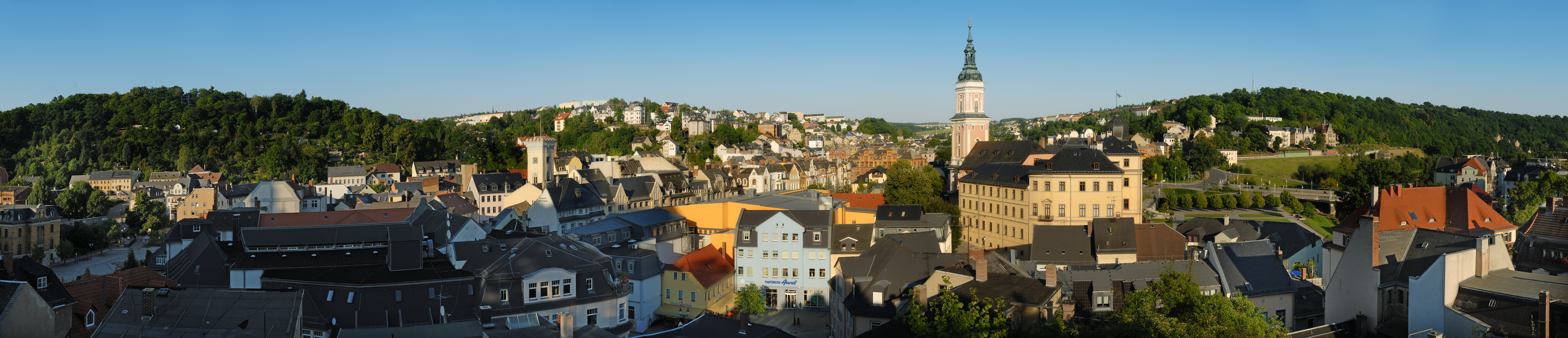
View over the town

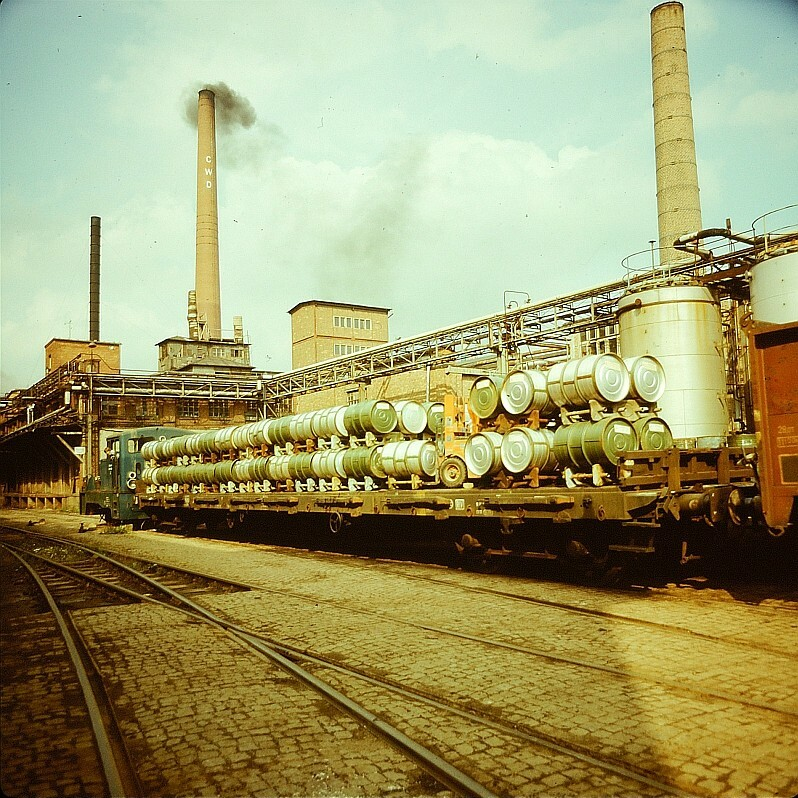
The VEB chemical factory at Greiz-Dölau 1979

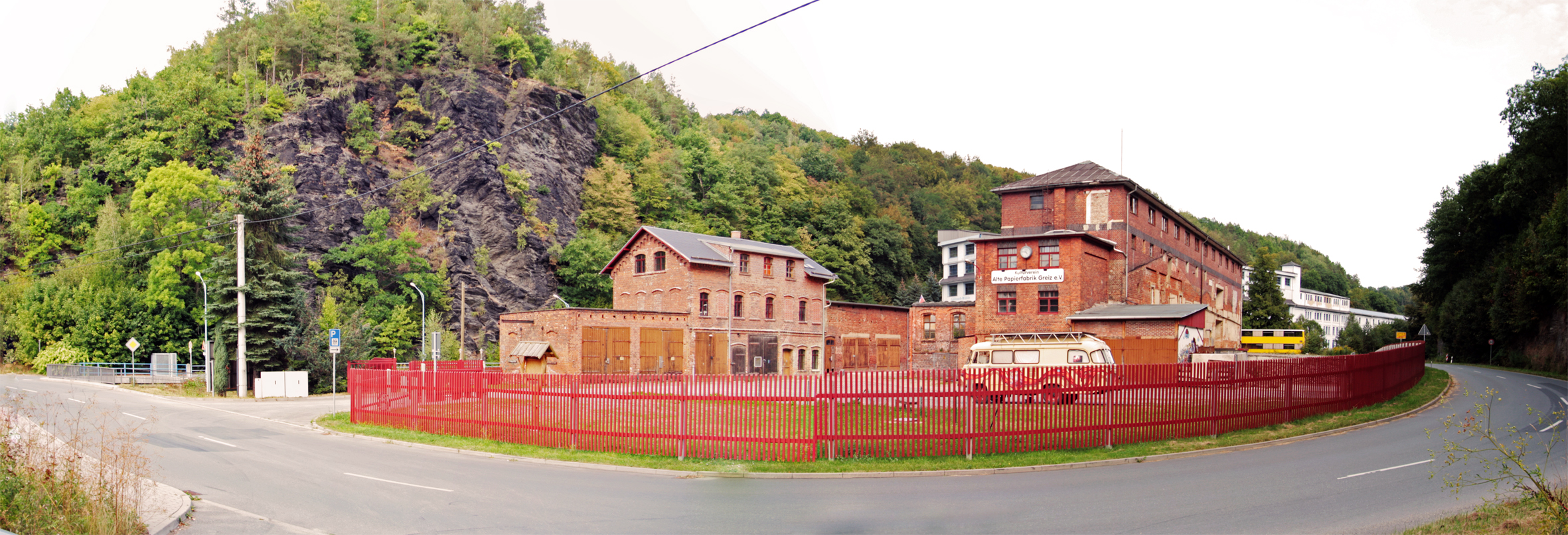
The old paper factory

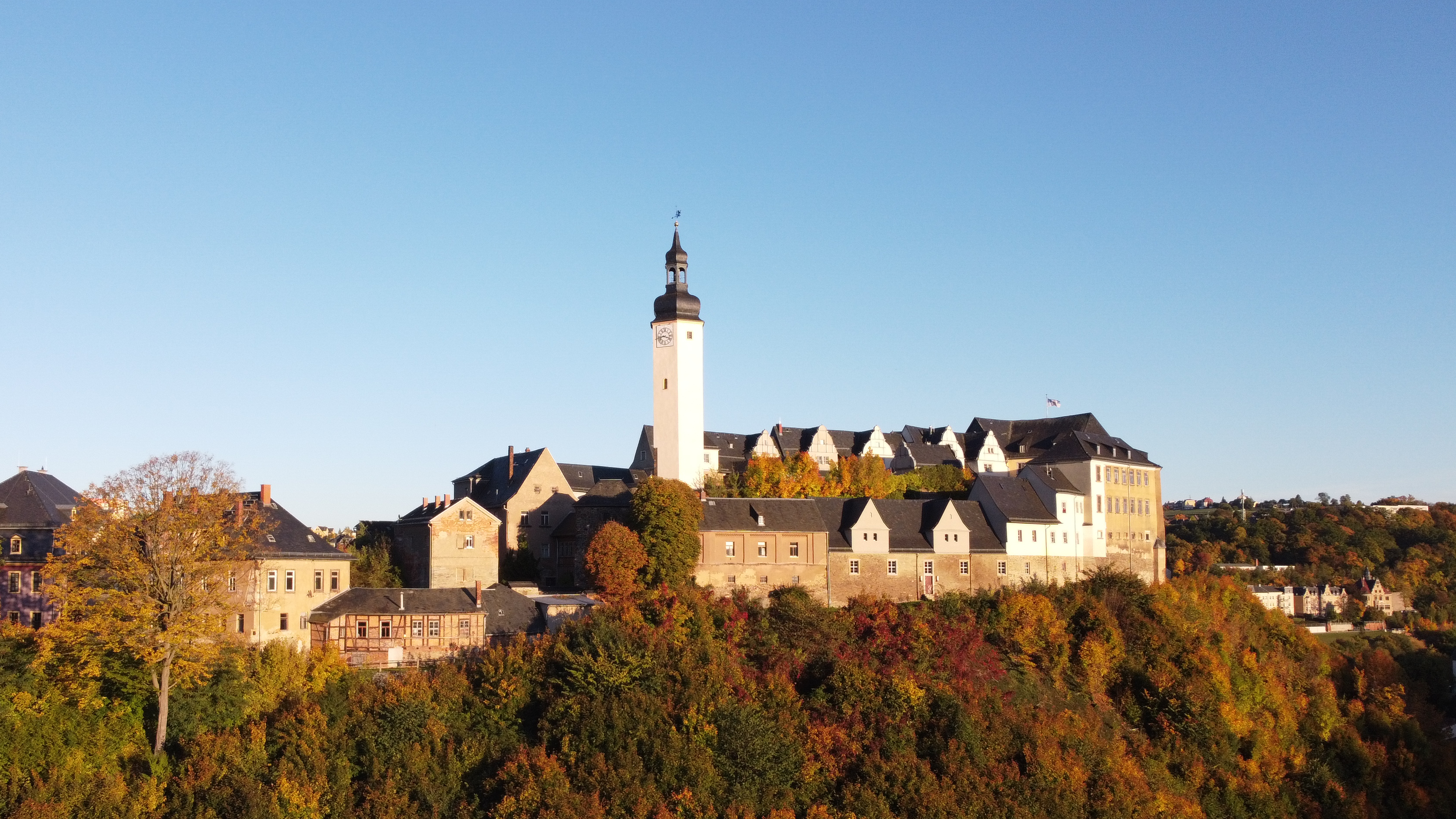
Aerial view of Upper Castle, 2022

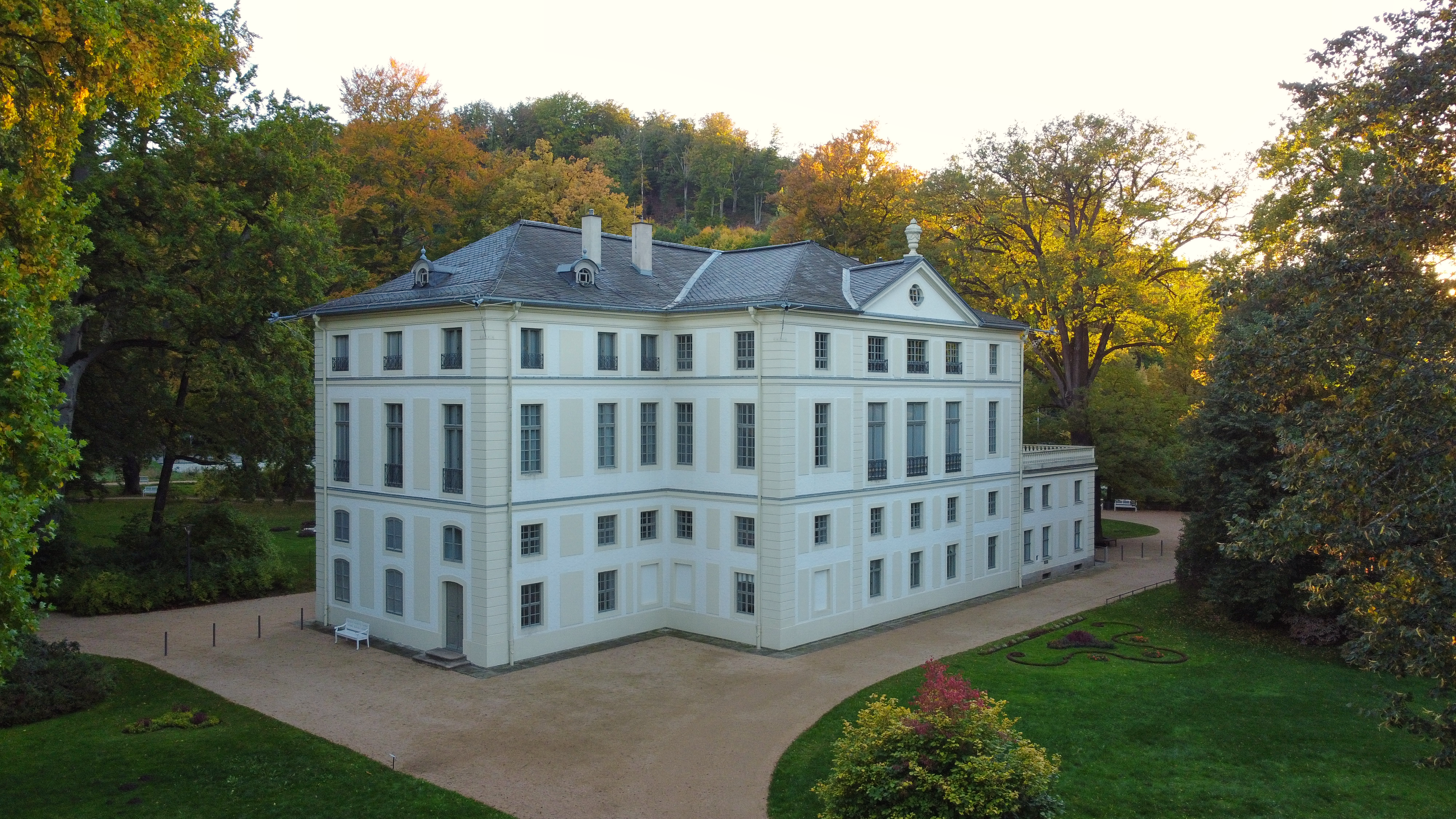
Sommerpalais (Summer Palais)

== Neighbouring towns and districts ==
The following are the districts adjacent to Greiz:

- In the Greiz district: Zeulenroda-Triebes, Langenwetzendorf, Mohlsdorf-Teichwolframsdorf, Berga/Elster
- In the Vogtlandkreis district (Saxony): Reichenbach im Vogtland, Netzschkau, Elsterberg, Pöhl, Plauen, Rosenbach/Vogtl.

Adjacent towns include:

- Elsterberg
- Reichenbach im Vogtland
- Hohenleuben
- Werdau

== Transport ==
Greiz station is on the Gera Süd–Weischlitz railway.

== Demographics ==
The current population is about 20,400. Like many towns in the former East Germany, Greiz has suffered from population decline in recent years.

Population from 1800 to 2016

Number of inhabitants (since 1960 as of 31st December)

Year	Pop.	±%
1800	4,000	—
1833	5,600	+40.0%
1885	17,288	+208.7%
1905	23,114	+33.7%
1931	39,281	+69.9%
1946 (Note: Census 29 October)	45,410	+15.6%
1950 (Note: Census 31 August)	42,520	−6.4%
1960	39,097	−8.1%
1971	38,608	−1.3%
1981	36,684	−5.0%

Year	Pop.	±%
1984	35,822	−2.3%
1994	30,206	−15.7%
1995	29,402	−2.7%
1996	28,610	−2.7%
1997	27,992	−2.2%
1998	27,324	−2.4%
1999	26,706	−2.3%
2000	26,177	−2.0%
2001	25,605	−2.2%
2002	25,037	−2.2%

Year	Pop.	±%
2003	24,591	−1.8%
2004	24,199	−1.6%
2005	23,764	−1.8%
2006	23,368	−1.7%
2007	22,936	−1.8%
2008	22,548	−1.7%
2009	22,150	−1.8%
2010	21,792	−1.6%
2011	21,310	−2.2%
2012	21,580	+1.3%

Year	Pop.	±%
2013	21,284	−1.4%
2014	21,111	−0.8%
2015	21,042	−0.3%
2016	20,920	−0.6%
2017	20,517	−1.9%
2018	20,103	−2.0%
2019	20,392	+1.4%

Source: Data source since 1994: Thüringian Federal Bureau of Statistics
