= Claudius Böhm =

German librarian and author

Claudius Böhm (born in 1960) is a German librarian and author.

== Life ==
Born in Leipzig, from 1970 to 1978 Böhm was a member of the Thomanerchor and attended the Thomasschule zu Leipzig. He studied philosophy and theology from 1980 to 1983 in Erfurt and from 1985 to 1988 library science in Leipzig. In 1988 he became librarian at the German National Library in Leipzig. After that he was a lecturer at a technical school. Since 1991 he has been a research assistant at the Gewandhaus. He has been editor there since 1992 and has been responsible for the Gewandhaus magazine since 1996. He is also the author of several books and articles on cultural and music history.

== Work ==
- Das Leipziger Stadt- und Gewandhausorchester: Dokumente einer 250jährigen Geschichte. Verlag Kunst und Touristik, Leipzig 1993 (with Sven-W. Staps), ISBN 978-3-928802-27-7.
- Das Gewandhaus-Quartett und die Kammermusik am Leipziger Gewandhaus seit 1808, and the chamber music at Leipzig Gewandhaus since 1808: 1808–2008. Kamprad, Altenburg 2008.
- Johann Adam Hiller: Kapellmeister und Kantor, Komponist und Kritiker, Beiträge zur Musikgeschichte Leipzigs. Kamprad, Altenburg 2005 (ed.).
- Mahler in Leipzig. Kamprad, Altenburg 2011 (ed.).
- Happy Birthday, Gewandhaus-Chor! Eine Saison lang wird 150. Geburtstag gefeiert. Kamprad, Altenburg 2011.
