= Leipzig Gewandhaus Orchestra =

Symphony orchestra in Germany

Gewandhaus Orchestra
- Orchestra
- Official logo of the orchestra
- Native name: Gewandhausorchester
- Founded: 1781
- Location: Leipzig, Germany
- Concert hall: Gewandhaus
- Concertmaster: Frank-Michael Erben
- Music director: Andris Nelsons
- Website: www.gewandhausorchester.de

The Leipzig Gewandhaus Orchestra (Gewandhausorchester; also previously known in German as the Gewandhausorchester Leipzig) is a German symphony orchestra based in Leipzig, Germany. It is often considered the world's oldest civic symphony orchestra, with the aim of fostering civic music and concert life within the city's foundational musical sites. The orchestra is named after the concert hall in which it is based, the Gewandhaus ("Garment House"). In addition to its concert duties, the orchestra also performs frequently in the Thomaskirche and as the official opera orchestra of the Leipzig Opera.

== History ==
The orchestra's origins can be traced to 1743, when a society called the Grosses Concert began performing in private homes. In 1744 the Grosses Concert moved its concerts to the "Three Swans" Tavern. Their concerts continued at this venue for 36 years, until 1781. In 1780, because of complaints about concert conditions and audience behavior in the tavern, the mayor and city council of Leipzig offered to renovate one storey of the Gewandhaus (the building used by textile merchants) for the orchestra's use. The motto Res severa est verum gaudium ("only a serious thing is a true joy", or "true joy is a serious thing" – from the Roman author Seneca) was painted in the hall, suggesting the priorities of the sponsors. The orchestra gave its first concert in the Gewandhaus in 1781. The orchestra thus has a good claim to being the oldest continuing orchestra in Germany founded by the bourgeoisie, while older orchestras were part of royal suites.

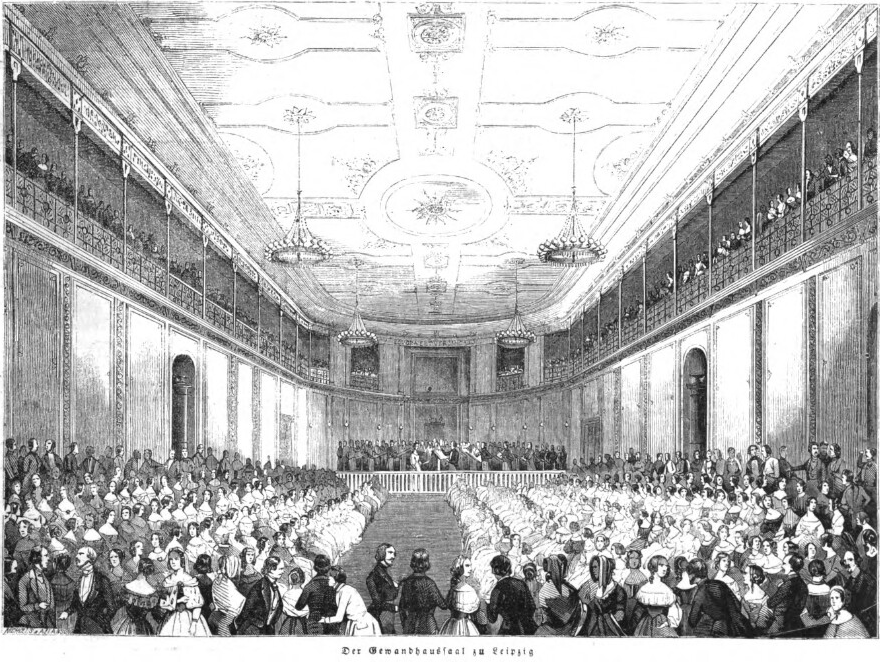
An engraving from 1845 of the first Gewandhaus concert hall in Leipzig.

In 1835, Felix Mendelssohn became the orchestra's music director, with the traditional title of Gewandhauskapellmeister, and held the post until his death in 1847. Several other musicians shared the duties with Mendelssohn during his tenure, including his close friends Ferdinand David, Ferdinand Hiller, and Niels Gade. In 1885, the orchestra moved into a new hall in the Musikviertel neighbourhood. This was destroyed by bombing in 1944. The present Gewandhaus is the third building with the name. It was opened in 1981. The large organ in the hall bears the original Gewandhaus hall's motto "Res severa verum gaudium" .

External audio
- You may hear the Gewandhaus Orchestra led by Riccardo Chailly with Nelson Freire performing Johannes Brahms Piano Concerto No. 1 in D minor, Op. 15 in 2006; Here on archive.org
- You may hear the Gewandhaus Orchestra led by Riccardo Chailly with Nelson Freire performing Johannes Brahms Piano Concerto No. 2 in B-flat Major, Op. 83 in 2006; Here on Archive.org

Later principal conductors included Arthur Nikisch, Wilhelm Furtwängler, Bruno Walter, and Václav Neumann. From 1970 to 1996, Kurt Masur was Gewandhauskapellmeister, and he and the orchestra made a number of recordings for the Philips label. From 1998 to 2005, Herbert Blomstedt held the same position, and they in turn made several recordings for the Decca label. Blomstedt held the title of conductor laureate with the orchestra until his death in 2026, while Masur held the post jointly with Blomstedt until his death in 2015.

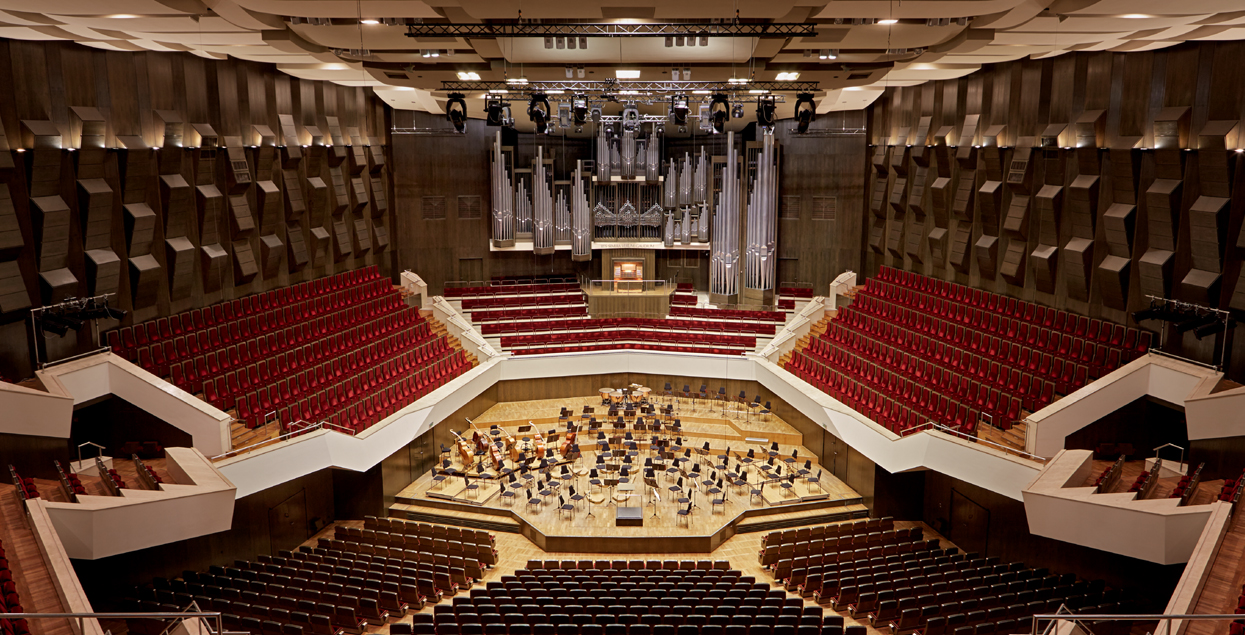
The interior of the Gewandhaus Auditorium in Leipzig

In 2005, Riccardo Chailly took over as both Gewandhauskapellmeister and music director of the Leipzig Opera, with an initial contract through 2010. In 2008, Chailly's first contract extension occurred, through 2015. However, he concurrently resigned as GMD of the Oper Leipzig, reportedly after conflict over the hiring of personnel without his consultation. In June 2013, the Gewandhausorchester further extended Chailly's contract through 2020. However, in September 2015, the orchestra announced the newly scheduled conclusion of Chailly's tenure as Gewandhauskapellmeister in June 2016, four years ahead of the previously agreed-upon contract extension, at Chailly's request.

Andris Nelsons first guest-conducted the orchestra in December 2011, and returned for subsequent guest engagements in June 2013, July 2014 and December 2014. In September 2015, the orchestra announced the appointment of Nelsons as its next Gewandhauskapellmeister, effective with the 2017–2018 season, with an initial contract of 5 seasons. In parallel, the orchestra announced a new artistic collaboration with the Boston Symphony Orchestra, of which Nelsons is the current music director. In October 2020, the orchestra announced a further extension of Nelsons' contract as Gewandhauskapellmeister through 31 July 2027. In August 2025, the orchestra announced the most recent extension of Nelsons' contract for an additional five years, through 31 July 2032.

== Music directors (Gewandhauskapellmeister) ==
- Johann Adam Hiller (1781–1785)
- Johann Gottfried Schicht (1785–1810)
- Johann Philipp Christian Schulz (1810–1827)
- Christian August Pohlenz (1827–1835)
- Felix Mendelssohn (1835–1847)
- Ferdinand David (1841–1842, 1852–1854)
- Ferdinand Hiller (1843–1844)
- Niels Gade (1844–1848)
- Julius Rietz (1848–1860)
- Carl Reinecke (1860–1895)
- Arthur Nikisch (1895–1922)
- Wilhelm Furtwängler (1922–1928)
- Bruno Walter (1929–1933)
- Hermann Abendroth (1934–1945)
- Herbert Albert (1946–1948)
- Franz Konwitschny (1949–1962)
- Václav Neumann (1964–1968)
- Kurt Masur (1970–1996)
- Herbert Blomstedt (1998–2005)
- Riccardo Chailly (2005–2016)
- Andris Nelsons (2017–present)

== Conductors laureate ==
- Kurt Masur (1996–2015)
- Herbert Blomstedt (2005–2026)

== Concertmasters (Konzertmeister) ==
- 1797–1818: Bartolomeo Campagnoli
- 1818–1835: Heinrich August Matthäi
- 1835–1873: Ferdinand David
- 1873–1897: Engelbert Röntgen
- 1987–present: Frank-Michael Erben

== Gewandhaus Composers ==
- Jörg Widmann (2017–2018)
- Heinz Karl Gruber (2019–2020)
- Sofia Gubaidulina (2020–2022)
- Thomas Adès (2023–2025)
- Arvo Pärt (2025–present)

== See also ==
- Category:Music commissioned by the Leipzig Gewandhaus Orchestra (4)
