= Max Strub =

German violinist (1900–1966)

External audio
- Shellac recordings with Max Strub in the Online Archive of the Österreichische Mediathek

Signatur of Max Strub, 1965

Karl Johannes Max Strub (28 September 1900 – 23 March 1966) was a German violin virtuoso and eminent violin pedagogue. He gained a Europe-wide reputation during his 36 years of activity as primarius of the Strub Quartet. Stations as concertmaster led him from the 1920s to the operas of Stuttgart, Dresden and Berlin. Appointed Germany's youngest music professor at the Hochschule für Musik Franz Liszt, Weimar in 1926, he followed calls to the Berlin University of the Arts and, after the Second World War to the Hochschule für Musik Detmold. Strub was a connoisseur of the classical-romantic repertoire, but also devoted himself to modern music, among others he gave the world premiere of Hindemith's Violin Sonata No. 2 in D major. He promoted the music of Hans Pfitzner. Strub played on a Stradivari violin until 1945; numerous recordings from the 1930s/40s document his work.

== Life ==
=== Origin and musical encouragement ===
Strub was born in 1900 as the eldest of three children of the photographer Otto Strub and his wife Ida, née Göhringer, in Mainz in the then Grand Duchy of Hesse-Darmstadt. His mother was the daughter of a cigarette manufacturer from the neighboring Biebrich, a district of Wiesbaden that was later incorporated. His sister Elisabeth married an American manufacturer with whom she was to settle in Weimar. Rosa, his younger sister, also spent most of her life there.

The father earned his living mainly with post-mortem photography. In his Mainz atelier in the Frauenlobstraße 25 in Neustadt, European violinists such as Willy Burmester, Joseph Joachim, Jan Kubelík and Henri Marteau as well as the still young Franz von Vecsey, whom he in turn photographed for free. Otto Strub was himself a passionate amateur violinist and supported Max musically to the best of his ability. There was a piano in his studio and he received his first piano lessons at the age of five. From the age of six he was taught violin by Alfred Stauffer, concertmaster of the Philharmonisches Staatsorchester Mainz. Kubelik recommended the ambitious father to contact the Viennese violin professor Otakar Ševčík. In his correspondence, however, he advised against a career as a musician for financial reasons.

In his native town, Strub attended the Rabanus-Maurus-Gymnasium, where he showed himself to be musically and artistically talented. He played in the school orchestra there, whose first violin he soon took over. The writer Carl Zuckmayer, four years his senior, with whom he was friends throughout his life, belonged to the cello group, Strub gave his first public concert at the age of twelve. He played with the Mainz orchestra Max Bruch's Violin Concerto No. 1 in G minor. Two years later, he performed Beethoven's Violin Concerto and the 3rd Piano Concerto in Frankfurt (then in Hessen-Nassau), among others. Zuckmayer retrospectively described the young Strub as a musical "child prodigy".

=== Violin studies in Cologne ===
Strub, who was gifted for playing piano and violin, had to make a decision and – without Abitur – sixteen years old on the advice of the conductor Fritz Busch, brother of the violinist Adolf Busch, the decision to join the violin class of the former concertmaster of the Berlin Philharmonic at the Rheinische Musikschule. Bram Eldering, a pupil of Joseph Joachim, to enter. Besides Strub, Adolf Busch and Wilhelm Stross were also trained by the Dutch music teacher Eldering. Together with his mother and younger sister, the underage student Strub lived with a landlord during the First World War. He was able to play until 1918 as second violinist at the orchestra rehearsals of the municipal Gürzenich Orchestra Cologne under the musical direction of Hermann Abendroth. He was open to all styles, including contemporary music. In 1918, Strub was awarded the Mendelssohn Prize in Berlin, combined with a performance under the conductor Otto Klemperer that was well-received in the local press. Together with the growing cello virtuoso Emanuel Feuermann he played Brahms' Double Concerto in A minor. He remained at the Cologne Conservatory for another year.

=== Chamber musician, concert master and professor ===
==== Stuttgart, 1921/22 ====
After a tour of Germany and Italy, in August 1921 the Landes music director Fritz Busch brought Strub to Stuttgart as concert master and thus successor to Karl Wendling at the orchestra of the Staatstheater Stuttgart. Strub, who had little orchestral experience at the time, was Busch's last choice after the application process had been disillusioned. Busch described him as a "first-rate violinist" and predicted a steep career for him. His contract obliged him to perform opera and symphony concerts, i.e. 10 performances plus rehearsals each, whereby he was released from rehearsals and from the operetta service. At the events in the opera, the concertmaster Reinhold Rohlfs-Zoll, who had been Wendling's representative for a time, was treated as an equal. Busch pursued a modern programming at the Landestheaterorchester, which was not always received positively by the critics. During Strub's period of service, in October 1921, Ewald Straesser's Fourth Symphony op. 44 premiered in the Stuttgart Kultur- und Kongresszentrum Liederhalle . The private citizen Strub became acquainted with the Busch family of musicians and the conductor Busch later became godfather of his son Harald Strub, along with the violin teacher Eldering.

==== Dresden, 1922–1925 ====
With Busch, who had been enticed away to Dresden, Strub moved to the Sächsische Staatskapelle Dresden of the Staatsoper Dresden (Semperoper) in 1922, where he took the position of first concertmaster. After his performance of Brahms' Violin concerto the orchestra decided unanimously for Strub. During his time with the orchestra in 1924 at the Staatsschauspiel Dresden, Busch was responsible for the premiere of Strauss’ Intermezzo, "bürgerlichen Komödie mit sinfonischen Zwischenspielen" (bourgeois comedy with symphonic interludes). In the same year, Strub was assigned the Dutch violinist Jan Dahmen as first concert master. After Strub had left the Saxon capital in favour of a career as a soloist and music teacher, he was succeeded by Karl Thomann.

In 1923, Strub replaced Gustav Havemann as first violinist in the Petri Quartet, to which the orchestra musicians Erdmann Warwas (2nd violin), Alfred Spitzner (alto) and Georg Wille (violoncello) belonged. According to the historian Michael Hans Kater, he soon surpassed his predecessor Havemann as a string player.

==== Weimar 1925–1928 ====
A friend of the family of his wife Hilde Neuffer, who was married in 1922, the director of the music school Bruno Hinze-Reinhold, moved the Strubs to Thuringia the state capital of Weimar. From April 1925, Strub was the full-time head of one of the two violin classes (alongside Robert Reitz) at the Hochschule für Musik Franz Liszt, Weimar as successor to the pedagogue Paul Elgers. He established the violin school Die Kunst des Violinspiels (1923) in Weimar of the internationally active violin teacher Carl Flesch known to him. In 1926, 26-year-old Strub was the youngest musician in Germany to receive a professorship. According to the Weimar composer and music teacher Eduard August Molnar jr., his vocation, however, also brought forth envious people who only approved of such a teaching obligation around the age of 60. To avert Strub's departure for Berlin, he was made a civil servant in 1927; in addition, his salary increased. Although Strub moved to the capital in 1928, he continued to teach in Weimar two days a week until 1930. Also because of its international reputation, the music school was transformed into a music academy in 1930.

In the 1927/28 season, he briefly represented the conductor Ernst Praetorius at the music school orchestra that was being established. In 1927, following in the footsteps of Robert Reitz, he formed together with Bruno Hinze-Reinhold (pianist) and Walter Schulz (cellist) the Weimarer Trio. His successor was Hans Bassermann in 1930. During the Weimar years he occasionally played in a duo with his wife Hilde. The couple lived in a rented apartment near the Schloss Weimar.

==== Berlin, 1928–1945 ====
===== Weimar Republic =====
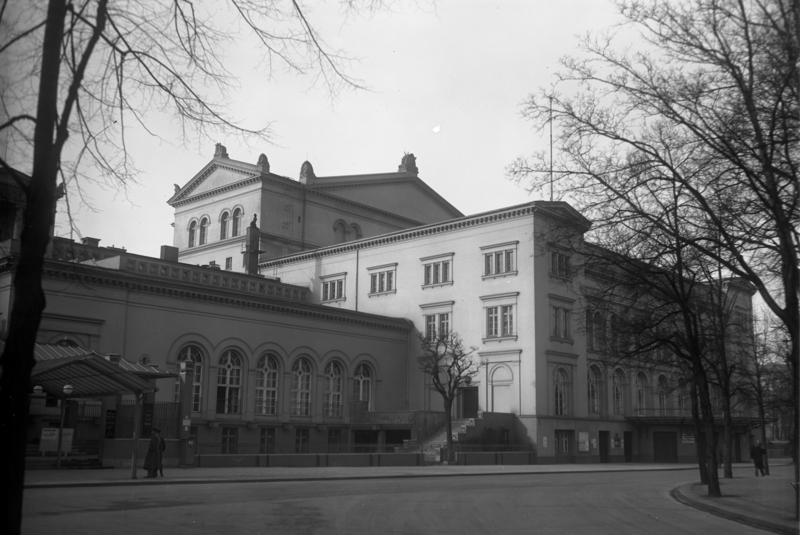
State Opera on Republic Square (Kroll-Oper) in Berlin (1930)

Generalmusikdirektor Otto Klemperer engaged Strub in 1928 with the Austrian Josef Wolfsthal as co-concert master at the Staatskapelle Berlin, whereby Strub was assigned to the Kroll section, i.e. the venue of the Staatsoper am Platz der Republik. The programme included classical-romantic works as well as new symphonies by contemporary composers such as Max Butting and Ernst Krenek. In his apartment on the Lützowufer (Landwehr Canal) in 1931, Strub, who at the time was separated from his wife Hilde, accommodated the American composer Aaron Copland as well as Barbara and Roger Sessions. The originally planned Violin Concerto by Sessions did not come true due to a nervous breakdown by Strub. Even with the new soloist Albert Spalding, the composer could not come to an agreement in the end, so that the delayed work would not be performed for the first time in the USA until the 1940s. Public pressure from conservative cultural policy circles in Berlin and the economic consequences of the Great Depression led to the closure of the progressive house in 1931. Despite the decision of the Prussian policy, Strub remained loyal to the Staatskapelle and became successor of the young deceased Wolfsthal in 1931.

===== Nazi period =====
After the Machtergreifung by the Nazis in 1933, Strub was one of the musicians who remained in the German Reich. After the engagement of the second concertmaster of the Berlin Philharmonic Orchestra (BPO), Wilfried Hanke, to the Hamburg State Theatre, Wilhelm Furtwängler invited him as guest concertmaster on the foreign tour of his orchestra to England. The BPO appeared in January 1934 with a classical-romantic programme among others in the London Queen's Hall and the Royal Albert Hall. Strub made his solo debut in 1937 with Brahms' violin concerto at the BPO under the musical direction of the Swiss conductor Robert F. Denzler.

Among the numerous solo concerts Strub gave during the National Socialist period, were cultural events of decidedly political organizations such as the Militant League for German Culture and the staff music corps of the SS-Hauptämter. In 1943, he also took part in a Zwickau memorial concert for the "Gefallenen der Bewegung".

In 1935, Strub founded a piano trio with Friedrich Wührer (piano) and Paul Grümmer (cello). During the 1935 Summer, he succeeded the US-American violin virtuoso Florizel von Reuter in the piano trio of the pianist Elly Ney and the cellist Ludwig Hoelscher, with whom he played until 1940. Recordings of works by Schubert, Beethoven, Brahms and Schumann were made. Although the Ney Trio had its origins in the Weimar Republic, their leader Ney was close to the NS regime. Unlike Hoelscher, however, Strub could hardly be described as opportunistic. Thus, unlike his colleagues, he did not become a party member. Strub formed another trio in 1943 with the Swiss pianist Adrian Aeschbacher and the Spanish cellist Gaspar Cassadó. They continued to produce recordings after the war.

In addition, Strub repeatedly performed chamber music with the pianist and Pfitzner's friend Walter Gieseking. In 1940, they gave a concert in Hannover as part of a concert of the Nazi community "Kraft durch Freude". The programme included works by Schubert, Beethoven and Pfitzner. He also persuaded his students Hans-Ulrich Tiesler, Max Kayser and Franz Hopfner to perform the world premiere of Gieseking's Kleine Musik for three violins, which took place in the theatre hall of the Berlin University of the Arts.

At the same conservatory he represented Carl Flesch in the summer of 1933/34, who had a special agreement with the university since 1928. In July 1933 Strub was appointed a professor. In 1934, due to his Berlin commitments, he declined a call to the Hochschule für Musik und Theater München, where he was to take over the direction of a master class. In the post-war period in Germany, he did not return to the West Berlin Academy of Music, despite a hiring order.

In 1944 Strub was included in the Gottbegnadeten list ("Führerliste") as one of the most important violinists in the Third Reich, which saved him from military service.

==== Salzburg, 1945–1947 ====
After the Second World War, Strub was temporarily accepted in Wels in Upper Austria by the composer friend Johann Nepomuk David. The Mozarteum Orchestra Salzburg then engaged him for three years as concertmaster. At the Salzburg Festival in 1946 he performed Bruckner's Mass No. 3 with the orchestra conducted by Joseph Messner. In 1947 he was a teacher at the Internationale Sommerakademie Mozarteum Salzburg.

==== Detmold, 1947–1966 ====
For the 1947/48 winter semester, Strub took over the master classes for violin, interpretation and chamber music at the Hochschule für Musik Detmold; In 1957 he received a professorship. He often played as a soloist with the Nordwestdeutsche Philharmonie in Herford under the direction of Rolf Agop. In the 1950s, Strub founded a piano trio with the pianist Hans Richter-Haaser and the cellist Hans Münch-Holland.

During the Cold War he was repeatedly (1964–1966) invited as guest professor to the International Music Seminar of the GDR at the Hochschule für Musik "Franz Liszt" Weimar, his former workplace. Like before in Leipzig, when Hermann Abendroth was still kapellmeister at the Gewandhaus, he also frequented the conductor's house in Weimar, whom he already knew from his Cologne years. He also gave concerts with him, about 1949 as soloist at a concert of the Staatskapelle Weimar in Jena.

Strub last lived in Detmold and Stuttgart. After a stroke in 1966, Strub died at the age of 65 years in the hospital Bad Oeynhausen in Regierungsbezirk Detmold.

=== String quartet foundation: the Strub-Quartet ===
During his time in Berlin, Strub met the Swiss pianist Edwin Fischer, who accepted him into his chamber orchestra specialising in historically informed performance, supported him as a duo partner and encouraged him to form a string quartet. In 1929, together with Josef Krips, Rudolf Nel and Hans Schrader, he founded the first Strub Quartet. Four further instrumentations were to follow until 1965, among them the one that emerged in 1935 from the "Bonn Beethoven Quartet" with Jost Raba, Walter Trampler and Ludwig Hoelscher. The ensemble was one of the most famous German string quartets, played at home and abroad and was allowed to take over almost half of the Gewandhaus chamber concerts in Leipzig from the end of the 1930s.

== End of the war and Stradivarius violin ==
Shortly before the end of the Second World War, Strub worked in the County of Glatz in the Province of Silesia. With the approach of the Red Army, he, like other members of the Philharmonic, began to flee in a westward direction. In Prague he was briefly arrested by the Gestapo and after his release he was taken prisoner by Czech and Russian troops. In May 1945 he was sent to the infamous Strahov Stadium Ilag. There, he was brought before a military court as a supposed high party functionary, but was able to prove his musical profession by an audition. His Stradivari violin (1716), which he carried with him in a double case next to the Grancino, was irrevocably stolen by Russian soldiers. The valuable instrument was originally given to him by the Frankfurt patron Wilhelm Merton as permanent loan.

== Repertoire and significance ==
The violinist Strub was praised in professional circles for his "far-reaching technical perfection" as well as "beauty of sound and creative power". After Busch's emigration, Strub was even considered the most important German violinist besides Georg Kulenkampff. The historian Gert Kerschbaumer counted the virtuosos Kulenkampff and Strub among the "beneficiaries" of their time. The Strub Quartett and the Stross Quartet competed from then on for the heritage of the Busch Quartet in Germany. According to the musicologist and student of Strub Albrecht Roeseler, both primarii, without belonging to the "world elite", "enriched musical life [...] in the 1950s and 1960s through varied activities as soloists, chamber musicians, concert masters and teachers".

=== Old and classical-romantic works ===
Johann Sebastian Bach's Violin Concerto in A minor, BWV 1041, Max Strub and the Berliner Instrumental-Collegium conducted by Fritz Stein (1939)

Strub was a highly regarded interpreter of the "three big Bs" (Bach, Beethoven and Brahms). Thus he appeared as a soloist and others at the 25th German Bachfest of the Neue Bachgesellschaft in Leipzig, where he performed Bachs's sonata in A minor. A guest concert took the soloist Strub to the Lorensbergsteatern in Gothenburg in 1931, where he performed with the Gothenburg Symphony Orchestra conducted by Paul Scheinpflug. Under the conduct of Karl Böhm, Strub played two Brahms and Pfitzner concerts with the Vienna Symphony in the Konzerthaus, Vienna in 1938. He performed several times in the 1930s, 40s and 50s under the musical direction of Joseph Keilberth. He also recorded pieces for the Reichssender, whereby no decidedly "political music" was interpreted.

He had repeated appearances in the 1930s and 40s at the Beethovenfest and the chamber music festival in Bonn. His engagement for Ludwig van Beethoven went so far that in 1938 he participated with Hoelscher and Ney in the Beethoven-Fest of the Hitlerjugend in Bad Wildbad in the Black Forest and heroized the composer there. The guiding principles were printed in the Neue Zeitschrift für Musik. In the 1942/43 season, a guest performance took him to the Leipzig Gewandhaus, where he performed Beethoven's Violin concerto. After a complete cycle of all Beethoven string quartets at the Conservatorio Giuseppe Verdi in Milan, in 1942 Strub became the fifth violinist ever – after Adolf Busch, Lucien Capet, Eugène Ysaÿe and Joseph Joachim – honorary member of the Società del Quartetto di Milano. Außerdem erhielt er ein Diplom als Ehrenmitglied des Bonner Beethoven-Hauses und ein Bild seines Streichquartetts wurde ebendort ausgestellt. In 1952, he attended a reception in Bonn with the Federal President Theodor Heuss and the Federal Chancellor Konrad Adenauer as well as the musicians Elly Ney and Wilhelm Backhaus in the context of the Beethoven celebration.

=== Contemporary music ===
Strub was one of the first German violinists to perform modern solo concertos and duos such as Alexander Glazunov's Violin Concerto (1923), Béla Bartók's 1st Sonata for violin and piano (1924), Darius Milhaud's Sonata for two violins (with Joseph Gustav Mraczek; 1925) and Karol Szymanowski's Violin Concerto No. 1 (1929) which he included in his repertoire. In 1922 he took part in the Concert performance as violinist and viola player at the Cologne first performance of Arnold Schoenberg's melodrama Pierrot Lunaire. In 1931 he participated in a performance of Bohuslav Martinůs Piano Trio No. 1 (Cinq pièces brèves) in Berlin, which was organized by the Berlin chapter of the International Society for Contemporary Music.

Through his participation in 1938 and 1939 to the National Socialist Propaganda Reichsmusiktage in Düsseldorf, he allowed himself to be politically instrumentalized as an artist. During the first Reichsmusiktage he took over the soloist part in the Second Symphony Concert. The Düsseldorfer Symphoniker played the violin concerto Geigenmusik in drei Sätzen (1936). under the direction of Hugo Balzer. The atonal work of the Berlin composer Boris Blacher was considered controversial at the time.

Contemporary composers like Günter Bialas, Karl Bleyle, Hans Pfitzner and Lothar Windsperger dedicated pieces to him. The premiere of the Violin Concerto op. 46 by Reinhard Schwarz-Schilling, which was scheduled as the 6th symphony concert of the Philharmonic Society of Bremen for 6 January 1941 with Strub as soloist and the Bremer Philharmoniker conducted by Hellmut Schnackenburg, was withdrawn at short notice by the composer. After a revision in 1953, the premiere finally took place in 1954 without Strub.

World premieres as soloist and chamber musician
Composer	Work	Event	Location	Year	Other performers
Paul Hindemith	Sonata in D for piano and violin, Op. 11, No. 2		Frankfurt	1920	Eduard Zuckmayer
Lothar Windsperger	Violin Concerto, Op. 39		Essen	1927	Düsseldorfer Symphoniker conducted by Hans Weisbach
Lothar Windsperger	String Quartet		Koblenz	1933	B. Marusat (?), R. Neb (?) and Hans Schrader (Strub Quartet)
Hans Pfitzner	Duo for violin and violoncello with small orchestra, Op. 43	Frankfurter Museumsgesellschaft	Frankfurt	1937	Ludwig Hoelscher and the municipal orchestra (Frankfurter Opern- und Museumsorchester) under the direction of the composer
Karl Höller	String Quartet in E major, Op. 24	Gewandhaus chamber music	Leipzig	1938	Jost Raba, Walter Trampler and Ludwig Hoelscher (Strub Quartet)
Johann Nepomuk David	Duo concertante for violin and cello, Werk 19	2nd Gewandhaus chamber music	Leipzig	1938	Ludwig Hoelscher
Paul Juon	Burletta for violin and orchestra. Werk 97	4th Symphony concert	Dresden	1940	Sächsische Staatskapelle Dresden conducted by Peter Raabe
Anton Bruckner / Armin Knab (editor)	String Quintet (arr, of the trio sketches in F major and F sharp major to the Scherzo of the Symphony No. 9 in D minor (WAB 109)	2nd Leipziger Bruckner-Fest	Leipzig	1940	Hermann Hubl, Hermann Hirschfelder and Hans Münch-Holland (Strub Quartet) as well as Emil Seiler
Theodor Berger	Rhapsodic Duo for violin and cello with Orchestra, Op. 9		Frankfurt	1942	Rudolf Metzmacher
Hans Pfitzner	String Quartet in C minor, Op. 50	Berlin Art Weeks	Berlin	1942	Hermann Hubl, Hermann Hirschfelder and Hans Münch-Holland (Strub Quartet)
Johannes Driessler	String Quartet, Op. 41/1	Ten-year anniversary of the Hochschule für Musik Detmold	Detmold	1957	Ruth Wagner, Walter Müller and Irene Güdel (Strub Quartet)
Günter Bialas	String Trio	musica-viva-Konzert / 50th birthday of the composer	Detmold	1957	Walter Müller and Irene Güdel

=== Patron of the music of Hans Pfitzner ===
Strub, who came into contact with the works of Hans Pfitzner as a seventeen-year-old, became acquainted with the composer in the 1920s at the Stuttgart Opera. He became friend with him and from then on promoted his music. Strub war selbst dedicator of Pfitzner's Duo für Violine, Violoncello und kleines Orchester op. 43 und von dessen Streichquartett op. 50. The Ney-Trio played especially the piano trio in F major op. 8 by Pfitzner . As a soloist Strub performed Pfitzner's violin concerto with the BPO under Hans Knappertsbusch (in the Berlin Philharmonic) and Joseph Keilberth (in the Admiralspalast). The latter should have been his last concert before the end of the Second World War. Immediately before Pfitzner's death (1949), Strub visited his friend in Salzburg, where a series of photographs was taken. The year before his death, Strub was elected Deputy Chairman of the Hans Pfitzner Society in Munich.

The music historian Fred K. Prieberg quoted Strub in the Handbuch Deutsche Musiker 1933–1945 among others with the following words referring to Pfitzner, which Strub found in a publication about the Kulturpolitisches Arbeitslager of the Kultur- und Rundfunkamt der Reichsjugendführer 1938: The harmonious triad: creator, reproducer and receptive, as Pfitzner says, here in the concerts for the Hitler Youth, there is a reverent note, and a fundamental tone forms the basis on which the guardians of German art should grow up!

== Students ==
Carl Zuckmayer (1945) once described Strub as "one of the best orchestra players and violin teachers in Europe. Some of Strub's violin students later played in renowned string quartets (such as the Gewandhaus Quartet, the Bastiaan Quartet, the Stross Quartet and the Munich String Quartet). His circle of students in Weimar, Berlin, Salzburg and Detmold included among others:

- Weimar: Hedy Aschermann and Edmund Kötscher
- Berlin: Byeongso Ahn, Hans-Georg Arlt, Johannes Bastiaan, Jürgen Hinrich Hewers, Willy Horváth, Max Kayser, Ewald Lassen, Bruno Lenz, Evi Liivak, Ursula Münzer-Linder and Horst Sannemüller
- Salzburg: Lukas David and Walter Kolneder
- Detmold: Götz Bernau, Werner Grobholz, Franz-Josef Kupczyk, Albrecht Roeseler, Gustav Schmahl and Kurt-Christian Stier

== Family ==
From 1922 to 1932, Strub was married to his former fellow student Hilde Neuffer (1897–1980; later Rawson). She came from a Weimar family of artists and was the daughter of the Jewish court actor Dagobert Neuffer and the writer Hildegard Neuffer-Stavenhagen. The Strubs married in the Evangelical-Lutheran Herderkirche in Weimar and had two children. Their son Harald Strub (1923–1988) became a cellist and member of the Arriaga Quartet. Their daughter Elgin Strub (Ronayne), born in 1929, a concert pianist and author of various articles on the Strub Neuffer-Stavenhagen family history, including 'Skizzen einer Künstlerfamilie in Weimar', which is the basis of much of this article. His Irish son-in-law John Ronayne was among others concertmaster of the Bavarian Radio Symphony Orchestra. In 1938 Strub married the Italian pianist Maria-Luisa Moresco; their son Patrick Strub (born 1947) became a conductor and violinist.

== Miscellaneous ==
The character of the famous cellist Felix in the film comedy All These Women (1964) by the Swedish director Ingmar Bergman is loosely based on the German violinist Jonathan Vogler, a pseudonym for Strub.

== Recordings ==
Strub has participated in numerous recordings as a soloist and chamber musician. Due to the 80 percent destruction the Electrola building in Berlin at the end of the Second World War, it is difficult to reconstruct the violinist's complete discography. Nevertheless, a list of recordings is available from the AHRC (Research Centre for the History and Analysis of Recorded Music) (CHARM). Looking back, his recording of Max Reger's 4th String Quartet in E flat major op. 109 is considered important.

- Johann Sebastian Bach

- Violin Concerto in A minor, BWV 1041 (Electrola 1939)

- Ludwig van Beethoven

- Klaviertrio D-Dur, op.70/1 Geistertrio (Electrola 1958, Marcato 1966, Hänssler Classic 2004)
- String Quartet No. 9, C major, op. 59/3 (Electrola 1941)
- Violin Concerto, D major, op. 61 (Electrola 1939, EMI 1979, Documents 2002/03, Warner Classics 2017)

- Franz Benda

- Presto, from Violinkonzert A major (Electrola ?)

- Johannes Brahms

- Piano Trio No. 2, C-Dur, op. 87 (Electrola 1944, meloclassic 2014)

- Anton Bruckner

- String quintet, F major, WAB 112 (Electrola 1940 ?, Pristine Audio 2017)

- Arcangelo Corelli

- Adagio for violin and piano (Electrola 1937)

- Antonín Dvořák

- Finale, from String quartet, F major, op. 96 American Quartet (Bertelsmann Schallplattenring 1959)

- Georg Friedrich Händel

- Andante, from the Trio in C minor (His Master's Voice ?, Electrola ?)

- Joseph Haydn

- Trio Nr. 1, F major, Hob. XV:37 (Deutsche Grammophon 1948)
- Variations from Streichquartett, C major, op. 76/3, Hob. III:77 Kaiserquartett (Bertelsmann Schallplattenring 1959 and 1961, Orbis 1967, Parnass 1968)

- Karl Höller

- String quartet no. 1, E major, op. 24 (Electrola 1938)

- Felix Mendelssohn Bartholdy

- Canzonetta, from the String quartet no. 1 in E flat major, op. 12 (Bertelsmann Schallplattenring 1959)

- Wolfgang Amadeus Mozart

- Andante con variazioni und Allegretto, from the Klaviertrio KV 564 (Electrola 1944, meloclassic 2014)
- Clarinet Quintet in A major KV 581 (Electrola 1941, Clarinet Classics 2000)
- Menuett, from the Youth concerto in D major for harpsichord and strings KV 107 (His Master's Voice ?, Electrola ?)

- Hans Pfitzner

- Duo for violin, violoncello and small orchestra op. 43 (Electrola 1938, Preiser Records 1990 and 1997, EMI 1994, Naxos Germany 1997)

- Max Reger

- Liebstraum (Electrola 1936, A Classical Record 1995)
- String Quartet No. 4, E flat major, op. 109 (Electrola 1936 und 1938)
- Burlesque (No. 4) and Minuet (No. 5), from the Suite in A minor for violin and piano op. 103a (Electrola 1936, A Classical Record 1995)

- Franz Schubert

- Piano Trio No. 1 in B flat major, op. posth. 99, D 898 (Polydor 1936)
- Piano quintet, A major, op. posth. 114, D 667 "Trout Quintet" or theme and variations thereof (His Master's Voice 1937, Electrola 1938, Bertelsmann Schallplattenring 1959, 1960 and 1961, Ariola 1960, Pearl 1995)
- String Quartet no. 15, G major, op. posth. 161, D 887 (Electrola 1937)
- String Quintet in, C major, op. posth. 163, D 956 (Electrola 1941, meloclassic 2014)
- violin sonata (sonatina) in G minor, op. posth 137/3, D 408 (Electrola 1937)

- Robert Schumann

- Gartenmelodie (Nr. 3), from Werke für Klavier zu vier Händen op. 85 (Electrola 1937)

- Louis Spohr

- Barcarole, G-Dur, op. 135/1, from the Six salon pieces for violin and pianoforte (Electrola 1937)

- Gerhart von Westerman

- String quartet no. 2 in C minor, op. 8 (Electrola 1941, meloclassic 2014)

== Writings ==
=== Manuscripts ===
Strub's correspondence with personalities of his time is distributed among various archives and libraries such as the Saxon State and University Library Dresden, the Landesbibliothek Coburg, the Universitätsbibliothek Würzburg, the Bavarian State Library in Munich and the Deutsches Literaturarchiv Marbach.

=== Published articles ===
- Künstlerische Probleme im Alltag des Geigers. In Alfred Morgenroth (ed.): Von deutscher Tonkunst: Festschrift zu Peter Raabes 70. Geburtstag. C.F. Peters, Leipzig 1942, pp. 222–227 (Numerized).
- Der Weg zu einer Freundschaft mit dem Meister. In Walter Abendroth (ed.): Hans Pfitzner: Ein Bild in Widmungen anlässlich seines 75. Geburtstages. On behalf of his friends and admirers. Heling, Leipzig 1944, pp. 107–111 and this. (ed.) in collaboration with Karl-Robert Danler: Festschrift aus Anlaß des 100. Geburtstags am 5. Mai 1969 und des 20. Todestages am 22. Mai 1969 von Hans Pfitzner. Peter-Winkler-Verlag, Munich 1969, pp. 66–68.
- Geburtstagsbrief für einen wahren Freund. In Freundesgabe für Paul Winter zum 29. Januar 1964. Joh. Prechter Verlag, Neuburg/Donau 1964, pp. 50–53.
- With Joseph Szigeti: Kollegen über Adolf Busch. In Wolfgang Burbach (ed.): In memoriam Adolf Busch. Brüder-Busch-Gesellschaft e.V., Hilchenbach-Dahlbruch 1966, pp. 57–61.

=== Interview ===
- Ernst Laaff: Vom Anfangsunterricht und vom Konzertsolisten. Gespräch mit Max Strub. In Das Musikleben 1 (1948) 2, p. 50f.

== Literature ==
Articles in reference works

- Wilhelm Altmann (ed.): Kurzgefasstes Tonkünstler-Lexikon. Vol. 2: L–Z. Part 2: Ergänzungen und Erweiterungen seit 1937. Founded by Paul Frank, revised and supplemented by Wilhelm Altmann. Heinrichshofen, Wilhelmshaven 1978, ISBN 3-7959-0087-5, p. 336.
- Hedwig und Erich Hermann Mueller von Asow (ed.): Kürschners Handbücher deutscher Musiker-Kalender 1954. 2nd edition of the Deutschen Musiker-Lexikons, de Gruyter, Berlin 1954, p. 1322.
- Brockhaus-Riemann Musiklexikon. CD-Rom, Directmedia Publishing, Berlin 2004, ISBN 3-89853-438-3, p. 10132.
- Walter Habel (ed.): Wer ist wer? the German Who's Who. 14th edition, arani, Berlin 1962, p. 1548.
- Friedrich Herzfeld (ed.): Das neue Ullstein-Lexikon der Musik. Mit 5000 Stichwörtern, 600 Notenbeispielen. Ullstein, Frankfurt among others. 1993, ISBN 3-550-06523-X, p. 700f.
- Wolfram Huschke: Strub, Max. In Gitta Günther, Wolfram Huschke, Walter Steiner (ed.): Weimar: Lexikon zu Stadtgeschichte. Metzler, Weimar 1998, ISBN 3-7400-0807-5, p. 437.
- Ernst Klee: Kulturlexikon zum Dritten Reich. Wer war was vor und nach 1945. Revised edition, Fischer, Frankfurt 2009, ISBN 978-3-596-17153-8, p. 541.
- Alain Pâris: Klassische Musik im 20. Jahrhundert: Instrumentalisten, Sänger, Dirigenten, Orchester, Chöre. 2nd extended, completely revised edition, dtv, Munich 1997, ISBN 3-423-32501-1, p. 768.
- Fred K. Prieberg: Handbuch Deutsche Musiker 1933–1945. 2nd ed., Kopf, Kiel 2009, ISBN 978-3-00-037705-1, p. 7555 and 9792.
- Rudolf Vierhaus (ed.): Deutsche Biographische Enzyklopädie (DBE). Vol. 9: Schlumberger – Thiersch. 2nd revised and extended edition, K. G. Saur, Munich 2008, ISBN 978-3-598-25039-2, p. 788.

Memory, eulogy and family history

- Helmut Grohe: Max Strub zum Gedächtnis. In Mitteilungen der Hans-Pfitzner-Gesellschaft 1966, 16th Folge, pp. 2–4.
- Elgin Strub-Ronayne: Der Geiger Max Strub (1900–1966). Von seinem Leben und von Künstlern, die es beeinflußt und bereichert haben. In Das Orchester 35 (1987) 11, pp. 1157–1162.
- Elgin Strub: Max Strub. In The Strad 101 (1990) 1208, pp. 994–997.
- Elgin Strub: Mein Vater Max Strub. In Ders.: Skizzen einer Künstlerfamilie in Weimar. J. E. Ronayne, London 1999, ISBN 0-9536096-0-X, p. 55–75 (Review: Ingrid Hermann: Skizzen einer Künstlerfamilie in Weimar. In Das Orchester 48 (2000) 2, p. 72).
- Carl Zuckmayer: Der Geiger Max Strub. Ein Scherzo von Kindheit und Gegenwart (1951). In Ders.: Aufruf zum Leben. Porträts und Zeugnisse aus bewegten Zeiten. Published by Knut Beck and Maria Guttenbrunner-Zuckmayer, Fischer, Frankfurt 1995, ISBN 3-596-12709-2, pp. 34–38 (selected in 1976; published in the Neue Ruhr Zeitung on 24 February 1951; Original in the Zuckmayer legacy in the Deutsches Literaturarchiv Marbach).
