= Strub Quartet =

String quartet

The Strub-Quartett was a well-known German string quartet from Berlin (1929–1945) and Detmold (1945–1965), named after primarius Max Strub.

== History ==
The first Strub Quartet was formed from the chamber orchestra of Edwin Fischer and was supported by the Swiss pianist.

At the beginning of the 20th century the Strub Quartet had a decisive influence on the German string quartet scene. From the late 1930s, the Strub Quartet, together with the Gewandhaus Quartet were responsible with the Chamber Trio for early music and the Gewandhaus Chamber Orchestra and the chamber music evenings at the Leipzig Gewandhaus. Concert tours took the ensemble through Germany as well as to other European countries such as Italy, Austria, France, Denmark, the Netherlands and Switzerland. The string quartet performed repeatedly in Milan since 1939, first at the Conservatorio Giuseppe Verdi, then in 1949 in the auditorium of Università Cattolica del Sacro Cuore and in 1951 in the Teatro Excelsior. During the Second World War (1 to 4 June 1943) the quartet also gave Nazi propaganda concerts in occupied France (Bordeaux, Poitiers and Angers).

In 1940 he became an honorary member of the Società del quartetto di Milano and in 1942 of the association Beethoven House Bonn. In 1952 it was invited to the Beethoven celebration. The string quartet also received a special audience with Pope Pius XII in the Vatican. The 1951/52 season was preceded by the Beethoven cycle in Munich and Stuttgart, and later by all of the composer's string quartets in the Mozarteum concert hall in Salzburg and in the Palazzo Pitti in Florence. Furthermore, the quartet gave concerts in the Accademia Nazionale di Santa Cecilia in Rome.

== Members ==
Max Strub (1929-1965) was a member of the string quartet throughout his life as primarius (1st violin). At his side were Josef Krips (1929–1933), Jost Raba (1934–1938), Hermann Hubl (1939–1951), Otto Schad (1951–1953) und Ruth Wagner-Nielen (1953–1965) as 2. violin, Rudolph Nel (1929–1933), Walter Trampler (1934–1938), Hermann Hirschfelder (1939–1951), Franz Beyer (1951–1953 and 1962–1965), and Walter Müller (1953–1962) as violist and Hans Schrader (1929–1933), Ludwig Hoelscher (1934–1938), Hans Münch-Holland (1939–1953) and Irene Güdel (1953–1965) as violoncellist.

== Repertoire ==
The Strub Quartet was specialised in the classical and Romantic repertoire as well as more modern music, for example by Max Reger and Paul Hindemith. It was responsible for the premiere of string quartets by Karl Höller (op. 24), Hans Pfitzner (op. 50), Lothar Windsperger and Johannes Driessler (op. 41/1) The string quartet also participated in the world premiere of the string quintet by Anton Bruckner arranged by Armin Knab.

== Discography ==
- Ludwig van Beethoven: String Quartet No. 9, C major, op. 59/3 (Electrola 1941)
- Anton Bruckner: String quintet, F major, WAB 112 (Electrola 1940 ?, Pristine Audio 2017)
- Antonín Dvořák: Finale, from the String quartet in F-Dur, op. 96 American Quartet (Bertelsmann Schallplattenring 1959)
- Joseph Haydn: Variations: String quartet in C major, op. 76/3, Hob. III:77 Kaiserquartett (Bertelsmann Schallplattenring 1959 and 1961, Orbis 1967, Parnass 1968)
- Karl Höller: String quartet no. 1, E major, op. 24 (Electrola 1938)
- Wolfgang Amadeus Mozart: Clarinet quintet in A major KV 581 (Electrola 1941, Clarinet Classics 2000)
- Max Reger: String Quartet No. 4 in E flat major, op. 109 (Electrola 1936 und 1938)
- Franz Schubert: Piano Quintet in A major, op. posth. 114, D 667 or theme and variations thereof (His Master's Voice 1937, Electrola 1938, Bertelsmann Schallplattenring 1959, 1960 and 1961, Ariola 1960, Pearl 1995); String quartet No. 15 in G major, op. posth. 161, D 887 (Electrola 1937); String Quintet, in C major, op. posth. 163, D 956 (Electrola 1941, meloclassic 2014)
- Gerhart von Westerman: String quartet no. 2 in C minor, op. 8 (Electrola 1941, meloclassic 2014)

== Literature ==
- Max Strub; Jost Raba; Walter Trampler; Ludwig Hoelscher; Elly Ney Strub-Quartett, Elly Ney Kammermusikabend : Donnerstag, den 18. Februar 1937, 20 Uhr, Kaisersaal der städtischen Tonhalle.
- Wolfgang Gruhle: Streichquartett-Lexikon: Komponisten, Werke, Interpreten. 3rd updated and extended edition, TRIGA – Der Verlag, Gelnhausen 2005, ISBN 3-89774-406-6, p. 323.
- Jürgen Stegmüller: Das Streichquartett. Eine internationale Dokumentation zur Geschichte der Streichquartett-Ensembles und Streichquartett-Kompositionen von den Anfängen bis zur Gegenwart. (Quellenkataloge zur Musikgeschichte. Vol. 40). Noetzel, Wilhelmshaven 2007, ISBN 978-3-7959-0780-8, p. 227.
