= Max Kayser (musician) =

German violinist

Max Kayser (born 11 February 1918) is a German violinist.

== Life ==
Born in Hamburg, Kayser studied violin privately with Lessmann in Berlin from 1939 to 1944. In 1940 he took part in the premiere of Walter Gieseking's Kleine Musik for three violins. Afterwards he attended Max Strub's master class at the Universität der Künste Berlin. Kayser was considered a "halbarian" and had to abandon his studies in 1944. Afterwards he worked as Concertmaster in the Berlin Doctors' and Lawyers' Orchestra.

After the Second World War he became 2nd concertmaster in the Kammerorchester Berlin. He also appeared as soloist among others with the Nordwestdeutsche Philharmonie. From January to August 1946 he was a member of the Berliner Philharmoniker orchestra. Afterwards he was 2nd concertmaster with the Radio Berlin Tanzorchester. From 1950 to the 1970s he was a member of Hans-Georg Arlt, concertmaster of the film, radio and stage orchestra Berlin. At the RIAS Berlin he was programme designer for light music with Irma Spallek.

Kayser was also first violinist of the Max Kayser Quartet with Milada Brosch as 2nd violin, Richard Kayser at the viola and Herbert Naumann at the cello. In 1947 he was responsible for the world premiere of Dietrich Erdmann's String Quartet. From 1965 to 1972 he formed a piano trio with Horst Göbel (piano) and Gottfried Schmidt-Enders (violoncello) in Berlin, which also gave concerts in other European countries. Kayser issued several recordings (Haydn, Mozart, Bruch, Svendsen and Bach among others).

== Literature ==
- Gerassimos Avgerinos: Künstler-Biographien: die Mitglieder im Berliner Philharmonischen Orchester von 1882 bis 1972. Self edited, Berlin 1972, p. 81.
