= Götz Bernau =

German violinist

Götz Bernau (born 26 May 1941) is a German violinist, music researcher, music pedagogue and music journalist.

== Life ==
Bernau was born in Braunschweig. After studying violin in Hanover (Karl Heinrich v. Stumpff) and Detmold (Max Strub), Bernau worked as a concertmaster in Bonn, Flensburg, Nuremberg and Regensburg. Between 1969 and 2004, he was first concertmaster of the Berliner Symphoniker, until 1990 Symphonisches Orchester Berlin (SOB), with whom he also appeared regularly as soloist in the Berliner Philharmonie and the Konzerthaus Berlin as well as on tour. Solo engagements have also taken him to orchestras in Europe, Turkey, the USSR, the USA and South America. In addition to the works of the classical violin concerto repertoire, Bernau also presented new compositions - including several premieres and first performances – and devoted himself to unknown and forgotten works from the classical, romantic and modern periods.

As a chamber musician, Bernau cultivates a repertoire of different instrumentations - in addition to his involvement with the string quartet and piano trio literature. The spectrum ranges from the one-man orchestra (Der Untergang der Titanic by Wilhelm Dieter Siebert for violin and percussion), duets for violin and one voice (without piano accompaniment) to the larger mixed formations (strings and winds, with and without piano). His collaboration in the Pihtipudas Kvintetti (Piano Quintet), which he co-founded, is worthy of mention and is also documented on several CDs (including several first recordings). Bernau is also active in the field of chamber music for contemporary composers (world premieres, e.g. of works by Carlo Domeniconi, Jaime Mirtenbaum Zenamon, Fazıl Say, Wilhelm Dieter Siebert) as well as for forgotten or rarely performed works, including revivals based on manuscripts and early prints of works from the classical and romantic periods.

A real speciality is a series of (partly semi-staged) concert programmes, in which Bernau and others are featured among others operas or opera composers (Carl Maria von Weber: Der Freischütz; Giacomo Meyerbeer) using contemporary adaptations of 19th century opera melodies (in duo with pianist Eckehard Scholl), which today can only be found in libraries.

He has made radio productions in various European countries and recordings on disks and CDs, both as a soloist and as a chamber musician.

In 2004, Bernau was awarded the Federal Cross of Merit of the Federal Republic of Germany for his extraordinary programmes, his commitment to contemporary works by German and especially Berlin composers, the presentation of foreign contemporary composers in Germany, as well as for his diverse music educational work.

== World premieres and first performances (works with orchestra) ==
- Mozart Camargo Guarnieri: Concerto No. 2 (first performance)
- Jeannot Heinen: Concerto piece op. 37 (1970) (world premiere)
- Paul Huber: Concerto No. 2 (1974) (world premiere)
- Helge Jörns: Concerto No. 2 (world premiere)
- Helge Jörns: Concerto No. 3 (world premiere, 2002)
- Ernst Krenek: Concerto op. 29 (1924) (US first performance)
- Ernst Krenek: Double Concerto for violin, piano and chamber orchestra op. 124 (1950) (German first performance)
- Usko Meriläinen: Chamber Concerto (1962) (German first performance)
- Friedrich Metzler: Concerto (1942) (first performance, 2001)
- Gisbert Näther: Concerto op. 66 (first performance, 1996)
- Pehr Henrik Nordgren: Concerto No. 3 op. 53 (1981) (German first performance)
- Wallingford Riegger: Variations for violin and orchestra op. 71 (1959) (German first performance)
- Aulis Sallinen: Concerto op. 18 (1968) (German first performance)
- Fazil Say: Reflections for piano, violin and orchestra (1990) (premiere, with the composer)
- Wilhelm Dieter Siebert: concerto (premiere, 2004)
- Heitor Villa-Lobos: Fantasia (European first performance)
- Sabine Wüsthoff: Concerto (world premiere)
- Jaime Mirtenbaum Zenamon: oracle violin concerto (world premiere)

== Recordings ==
With the Pihtipudas Kvintetti:

- Max Bruch, Pehr Henrik Nordgren, Alexander Borodin: piano quintets. eda records, EDA 1.
- Ernest Bloch, Amy Beach, Toivo Kuula: piano quintets. eda records, EDA 3 (1991).
- Edward Elgar, Camille Saint-Saëns: piano quintets. eda records, EDA 4.
- Jean Sibelius, Christian Sinding: piano quintets. eda records, EDA 7 (1994).
- Anton Rubinstein, Dmitri Shostakovich: piano quintets. eda records, EDA 10 (1996).
- Heinrich von Herzogenberg, Johannes Brahms: piano quintets. eda records, EDA 25
- Louis Ferdinand von Preußen, Daniel Steibelt: Klavierquintette. Concerto Berlin (2001).
- Antonín Dvořák, Max Reger, Bohuslav Martinů: piano quintets. Concerto Berlin (2010).

Other:

- Violin concertos by Paul Huber and Wolfgang Amadeus Mozart, with the Chamber Orchestra of Eastern Switzerland conducted by Urs Schneider. Berliton (LP).
- Musica Chirurgica. Compositions by surgeons (Alexander Borodin, Walter Courvoisier, Peter Lichtenthal, Carl Ludwig Schleich, Theodor Billroth) and by Marin Marais.
- Fruits of the Opera. Opera melodies in compositions for violin and piano (Eckehard Scholl). Concerto Berlin (2002).
- Works for violin and piano (Valentina Diaz Frénot) by Johannes Brahms, Antonín Dvořák, Remberto Gimenéz, Franz Schubert and Luis Szarán. Concerto Berlin (2003).

== Publications ==
- Carl August Pesch: Sonate B-Dur für Violine solo. Publisher: Götz Bernau, Möseler Verlag, Wolfenbüttel / Zürich 2000, OCLC 652944526, ISMN 979-0-2037-1071-4.
