= Karl Thomann =

Karl Thomann (5 June 1900 in Ústí nad Labem 19 July 1950) was a German violinist and music educator. Among other things, he was first concertmaster of the Staatskapelle Dresden.

== Life ==
Thomann was born in 1900 as the son of a music teacher in northern Bohemia. He received his first violin lessons from his father. He studied at the Prague Conservatory and at the University of Music and Performing Arts Vienna. with Otakar Ševčík. He received further lessons from Arnold Rosé.

Thomann unterrichtete in verschiedenen Adelshäusern: den Fürsten Fürstenberg und Schwarzenberg as well as the Waldstein family. He was first concertmaster of the orchestras in Chemnitz, Wiesbaden and Düsseldorf. From 1921 to 1925 he worked as a freelance artist in Munich. He declined calls to Aachen, Bremen and Stuttgart (successor to Karl Wendling). In 1925/26 he became the first concertmaster of the Staatskapelle Dresden as successor to Max Strub (of the Semperoper) under Fritz Busch. His successor was the Dutch violinist Francis Koene. Thomann then moved again to Munich, where he worked as a performer and teacher. In 1929 he moved to Berlin. In 1934 and 1939 he was appointed to the Bayreuth Festival Orchestra under Richard Strauss. In 1937, general music director Karl Elmendorff appointed him concertmaster at the Mannheim National Theatre.

As a soloist he played under renowned conductors such as Arthur Nikisch and Carl Schuricht. He performed among others at the Wiesbaden Festival and the Rheinische Musikfest. He has worked together with Wolfgang Ruoff and Georg Schumann in chamber music.

In June 1950 he was offered a professorship at the Hochschule für Musik Carl Maria von Weber Dresden, which he could no longer accept due to a fatal illness.

Thomann died in Mannheim at the age of 50.

== Literature ==
- Oskar Laurich: Prof. Karl Thomann †. In Aussiger Bote 2 (1950) 10, p. 24f.
