= Albrecht Roeseler =

German journalist and musicologist

Albrecht Roeseler (29 January 1930 – 6 August 1994) was a German violinist, musicologist and journalist. From 1973 to 1993 he was responsible for the headline of the Süddeutsche Zeitung.

== Life ==
Roeseler was born in 1930 in Berlin as son of the publishing director Johannes Roeseler and his wife Katharina, née Storbeck. He first attended the Dreilinden-Gymnasium in Berlin-Nikolassee and from 1943 up to the Abitur in 1948, the Landerziehungsheim Hermann-Lietz-Schulen at Schloss Bieberstein near Fulda.

From 1948 to 1950 he studied violin with Max Strub and music theory with Wilhelm Maler and Johannes Driessler at the Nordwestdeutschen Musikakademie Detmold. In 1950 he passed the state music teacher examination in the subject violin. From 1950 to 1956 he studied musicology and English at the FU Berlin and with the help of a Fulbright Program, at the Indiana University Bloomington. In Indiana Willi Apel and Paul Nettl were among his teachers. In the 1950s he was also violinist in the Berliner Symphonisches Orchester and in the "Indiana University Philharmonic Orchestra" as well as in the Aspen festival orchestra. In 1952/53 he also taught at the "Conservatory John Petersen" in Berlin-Zehlendorf. In 1957 he was appointed by Adam Adrio at the philosophical faculty of the FU Berlin with the dissertation Studien zum Instrumentarium in den Vokalwerken von Heinrich Schütz. Die obligaten Instrumente in den Psalmen Davids und in den Symphoniae Sacrae I which granted him his Dr. phil.

Roeseler then worked first as literary editor in publishing houses, most recently in Piper Verlag. From 1973 to 1993 he was head of the feature section of the Süddeutsche Zeitung in Munich.

Roeseler died in Haar (near Munich) at the age of 64.

== Publications ==
- with Wolf Loeckle (ed.): Musikhochschulen in Deutschland – wie gut sind sie?. ConBrio-Verlags-Gesellschaft, Regensburg 1994, ISBN 3-930079-46-1.
- with Wolf Loeckle (ed.): Franz Schubert – heute?. ConBrio-Verlags-Gesellschaft, Regensburg 1994, ISBN 3-930079-47-X.
- (Ed.): Eine kleine Lachmusik. Musikeranekdoten aus unserer Zeit. With 6 linocuts by Eduard Prüssen. 6th edition, new edition, Piper, Munich among others (1990), ISBN 3-492-10939-X (first edition 1971).
- Grosse Geiger unseres Jahrhunderts. Paperback edition reviewed and expanded by Norbert Hornig, Piper, Munich among others 1996, ISBN 978-3-492-22375-1 (first edition 1987).

== Literature ==
- Bruno Jahn (collaborator.): Die deutschsprachige Presse. Ein biographisch-bibliographisches Handbuch. Vol. 2: M–Z. Saur, Berlin 2005, ISBN 978-3-11-096157-7, p. 879.
- Joachim Kaiser: Ein überlegener Charakter (Nachruf). In Süddeutsche Zeitung, 8 August 1994, p. 9.
- Hans-Michael Körner (ed.): Große Bayerische Biographische Enzyklopädie (BBE). Vol. 3: P–Z. Saur, Munich 2005, ISBN 3-598-11460-5, p. 1633.
- Rudolf Vierhaus (ed.): Deutsche Biographische Enzyklopädie (DBE). Vol. 8: Poethen – Schlüter. 2nd revised and extended edition, K. G. Saur, Munich 2007, ISBN 978-3-598-25038-5, pp. 488f.
