= Ursula Münzner-Linder =

German woman violinist (born 1922)

Ursula Münzner-Linder (born 25 July 1922) is a German classical violinist.

== Life and career ==
Ursula Münzner (sometimes transcribed as "Münzer") was born in Bremerhaven in 1922. After attending the secondary school in her home town, she received violin lessons from Carl Berla in Bremen until 1939. She then studied violin with Gustav Havemann, Max Strub and Jost Raba at the Berlin University of the Arts.

From 1941 to 1945, she was a violinist in Fritz Stein's chamber orchestra. After the Second World War, she gave chamber concerts in Bremerhaven and made recordings for Radio Bremen. In 1952, she became first violinist at the Musikgesellschaft Bremerhaven.

On 10 October 1946, she married Kapellmeister Hans Linder. The couple had two children: Heiko and Helke. Hans Linder died on 16 October 1999.
