= Johannes Bastiaan =

German violinist (1911–2012)

Johannes Hans Bastiaan (1 February 1911 – 11 October 2012) was a German violinist. He was a member of the Berlin Philharmonic for over 40 years. From 1945 to 1970, he served as primarius of the Bastiaan Quartet.

== Life ==
Bastiaan was born in 1911 in Nuremberg as the son of the Dutch musician Gerrit Bastiaan. He attended primary schools in Berlin. When he was eight years old he received violin lessons from his father. From 1920 to 1924, he was taught by Robert Zeidler in Berlin. From 1925 to 1928, he attended the orchestra school in Berlin, where Carl Seidel was one of his teachers.

From 1928, he studied violin and chamber music with Rudolf Deman at the Universität der Künste Berlin. From 1931 to 1933, he attended the violin class of Max Rostal. After that he was his private pupil for a short time. Max Strub then taught him further at the Musikhochschule from 1933.

Bastiaan joined the chamber orchestra of Edwin Fischer as a permanent member in 1932. In the 1932/33 season, he played in the Rundfunk-Sinfonieorchester Berlin. In 1933/34, he helped out with the Berliner Philharmoniker until he became a permanent member of the orchestra under Wilhelm Furtwängler on 1 October 1934. In 1939, he received the position of the 3rd concert master. In the course of the "raids" by the Nazis he was given a precious Giovanni Battista Guadagnini violin on loan. During the 1945 denazification, he appeared as an advocate for his friend violinist Hans Gieseler. After the War, he acted as foreplayer and deputy principal of the 1st violins of the Berlin Philharmonic Orchestra. In addition to Furtwängler, he also experienced Leo Borchard, Sergiu Celibidache and Herbert von Karajan as principal conductors. In 1965, Bastiaan became a member of the Council of Five and in 1967 of the orchestra's Staff Council. In 1968, he became vice-chairman. In 1964 he was awarded the Golden Ring of Honour of the Berlin Philharmonic Orchestra. He left the orchestra on 31 August 1976.

From 1939 to 1945, Baastian played chamber music in the Pozniak-Trio in Breslau. In 1945, he founded the Bastiaan Quartet in Berlin, which he led as primarius until 1970. Concert tours have taken the ensemble to Germany and abroad. In 1963, he received the honorary title of Berlin chamber virtuoso.

From 1962 he was a lecturer for violin at the Berlin Conservatory. After the transformation of the Conservatory into the Julius Stern-Institute, he was a member of the teaching staff of the Berlin Academy of Music. In 1971 he became professor.

Bastiaan was a member of the Internationale Gesellschaft für Neue Musik.

In 2007 he took part in the documentary film Das Reichsorchester about the history of the Berlin Philharmonic Orchestra. An interview conducted with Bastiaan can be found in the booklet accompanying the CD edition Berliner Philharmoniker – im Takt der Zeit.

Bastiaan was married and father of two children. He died a centenarian in 2012 in Berlin aged 101.

== Recordings ==
- Arnold Schönberg, Pierrot Lunaire / Johann Strauss II., Rosen aus dem Süden and Schatz-Walzer, Audite/Deutschlandradio Kultur 1949/?/2012
- Johann Sebastian Bach, Weihnachtsoratorium BWV 248, Archiv Produktion 1955/56
- Franz Schubert, Der Tod und das Mädchen (String quartet) and Quartettsatz c-Moll, Eterna 1960
- Georg Friedrich Händel, Concerto grosso F-Dur op. 6 Nr. 2 / Otto Matzerath, Concerto grosso h-Moll op. 6 Nr. 12, Electrola 196?
- Dieterich Buxtehude, Mein Herz ist bereit, Time Life Records/Angel Records 1969
