= Bruno Lenz =

German painter and violinist (1911–2006)

Bruno Lenz (8 November 1911 – 16 June 2006) was a German painter and violinist. He was assistant concertmaster for 20 years of the Bavarian Radio Symphony Orchestra.

== Life ==
Lenz came from a family of teachers. He was born in 1911 as son of the main teacher Otto Lenz in Bollenbach (today Haslach im Kinzigtal) in the Black Forest. He received his first violin lessons in Freiburg im Breisgau. During the summer months from 1920 to 1924, Jules Siber was his teacher in the Kinzig valley. Besides his musical talent, he developed a devotion to visual arts at an early age. In 1924, he made his first portrait drawings. After his Abitur in 1925 at the Realgymnasium, he was encouraged in painting and drawing by Theodor Schück and in music by Otfried Nies from 1926 on. In 1933, he was given painting lessons by Otto Vittali and Arthur Braun, with Julius Bissier exerting a decisive influence on him.

Lenz studied violin with Gösta Andrasson in Basel and with Georg Kulenkampff and Max Strub in Berlin. In 1936, he had his first exhibition of paintings at the Kunstverein Freiburg. He also appeared as a soloist and chamber musician (Bruno Lenz Piano Trio, Lenz Quartet). In 1937, he took over the violin training classes at the Hochschule für Musik Freiburg until he was called up for the Wehrmacht in 1940.

After the Second World War, in 1945, he went to Augsburg, where he became a member of the Künstlervereinigung Augsburg "Die Ecke". In 1947, he took part in the Permanent Swabian Art Exhibition and in the Schaezlerpalais at the 11th Art Exhibition. In 1950, he exhibited at the Städtische Galerie im Lenbachhaus in Munich as part of "Augsburger und Schwäbische Maler". In 1951, he moved to Munich and became a member of the Bundesverband Bildender Künstlerinnen und Künstler. His works were shown in the Haus der Kunst and in the Galerie der Künstler. In 1957, he had a solo exhibition at the Wolfgang Gurlitt Gallery. In 1959, he took part in the "Great Art Exhibition" at the Haus der Kunst. In 1983, he received an invitation to the Villa Massimo in Rome. He realised further exhibitions in Offenburg and Konstanz. As portrait painter, he painted public figures such as Franz Burda, Eugen Jochum, Rafael Kubelík, Hans-Jochen Vogel, Georg Kronawitter, Joseph Cardinal Ratzinger, Karl Rahner, Heinz A. Staab and Horst Fuhrmann.

In 1950, he was offered a position as a professional musician in Munich. For 20 years, he was deputy concertmaster of the Symphonieorchester des Bayerischen Rundfunks under Eugen Jochum and Rafael Kubelik. In 1970, he ended his orchestral career and became lecturer at the Richard-Strauss-Konservatorium München (University of Music and Performing Arts Munich).

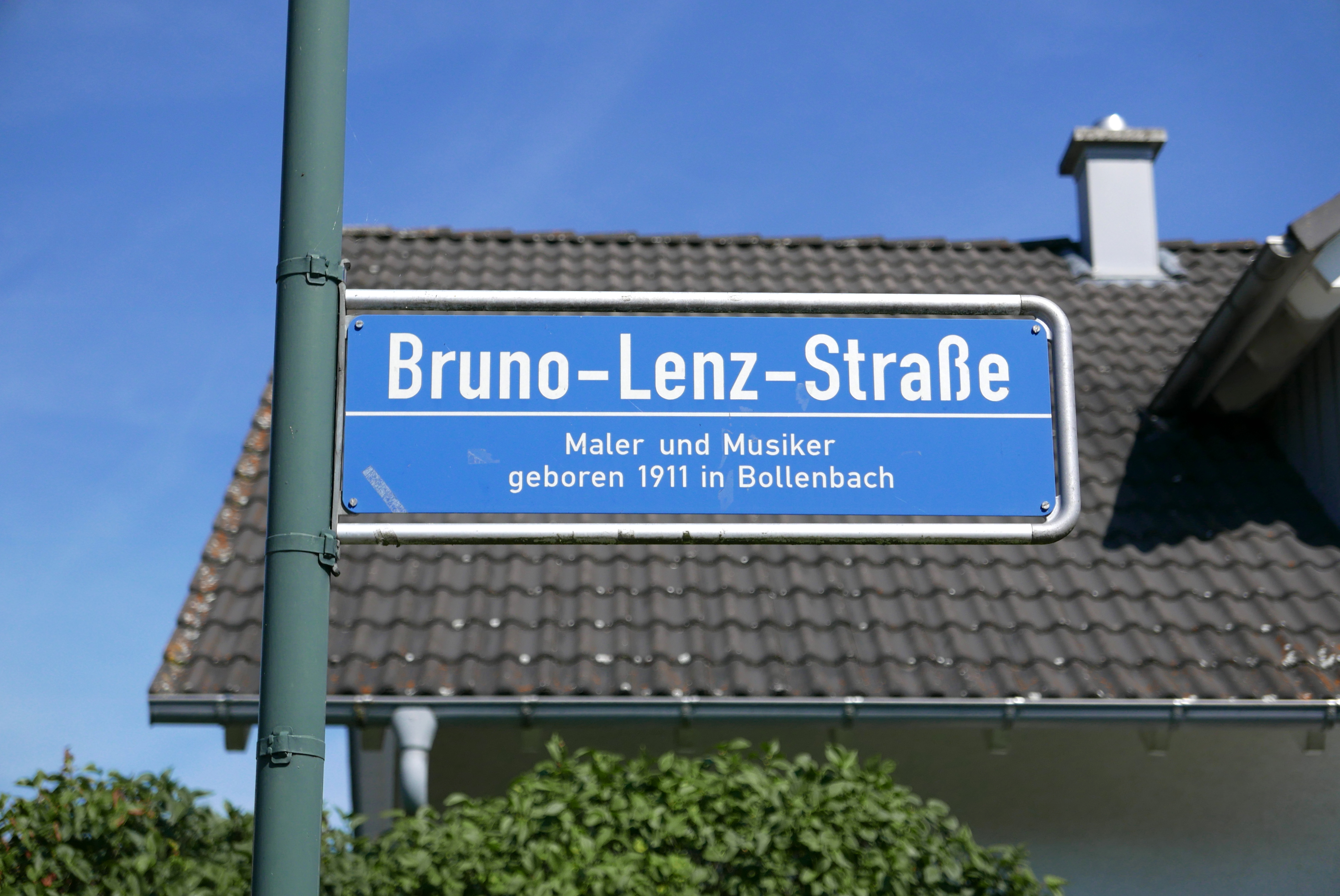
Street sign "Bruno-Lenz-Straße" in his birthplace Bollenbach

The "Bruno-Lenz-Foundation" was established in 2008. Some of his paintings were donated to the city of Haslach, where they are exhibited in the "Haus der Musik". In addition, a street in his home town in the district of Bollenbach was named after him, the Bruno-Lenz-Straße.

From 1939, Lenz was married to the musician Anne-Marie Fiedler and had two children.
