= Franz-Josef Kupczyk =

German violinist

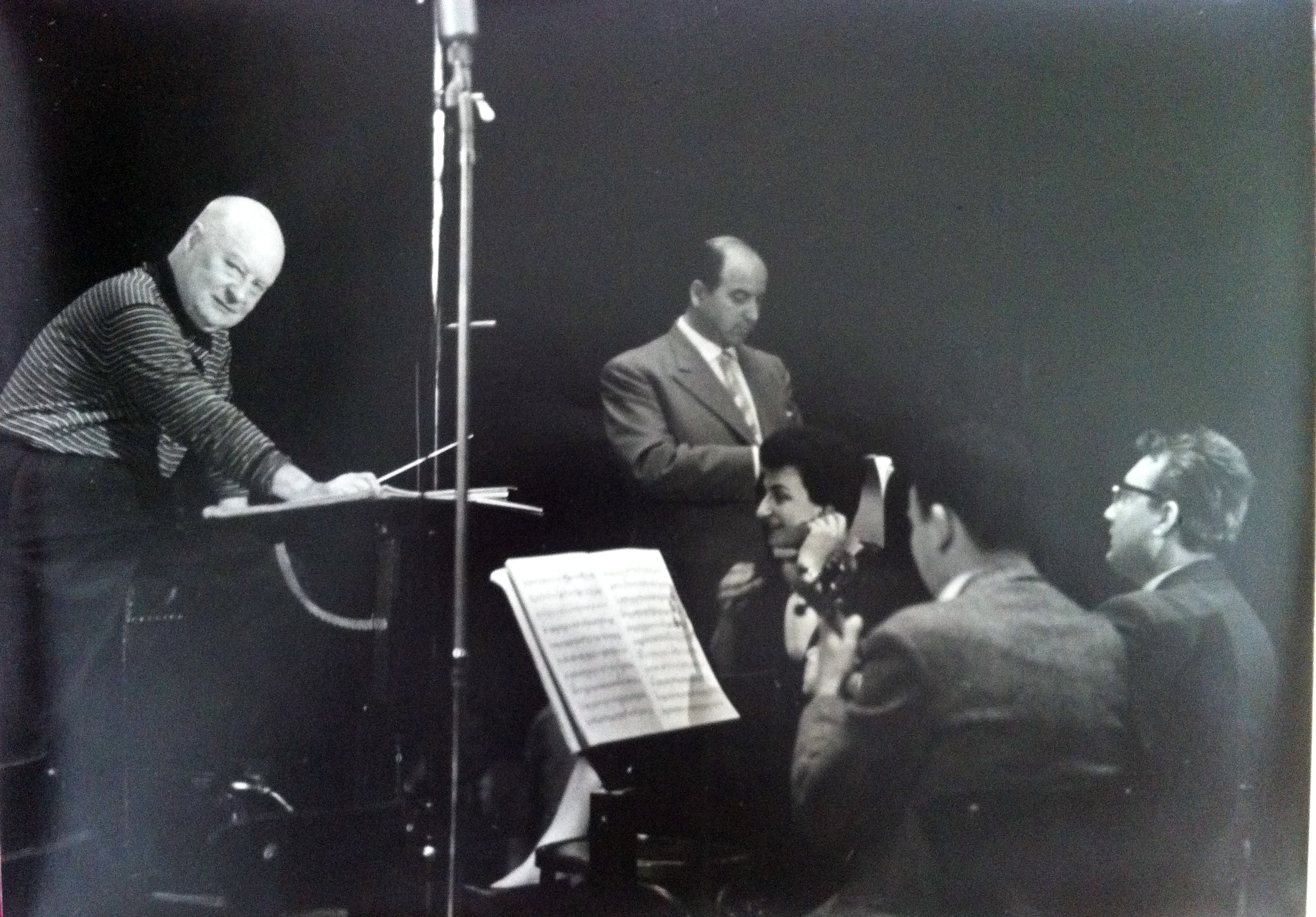
Kupczyk with Paul Hindemith 1960 in Bremen

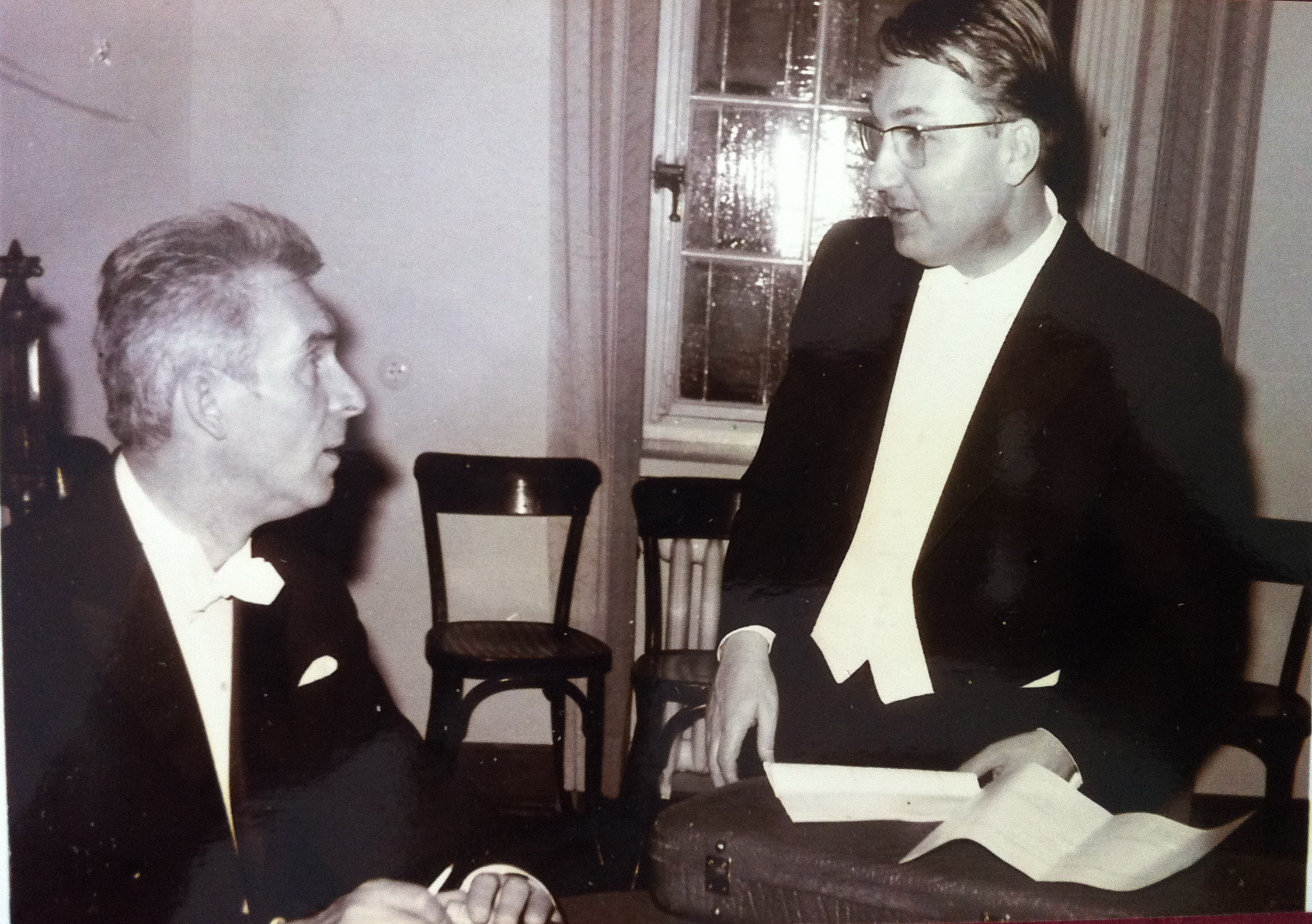
Kupczyk with Rudolf Kempe 1960 in Bremen

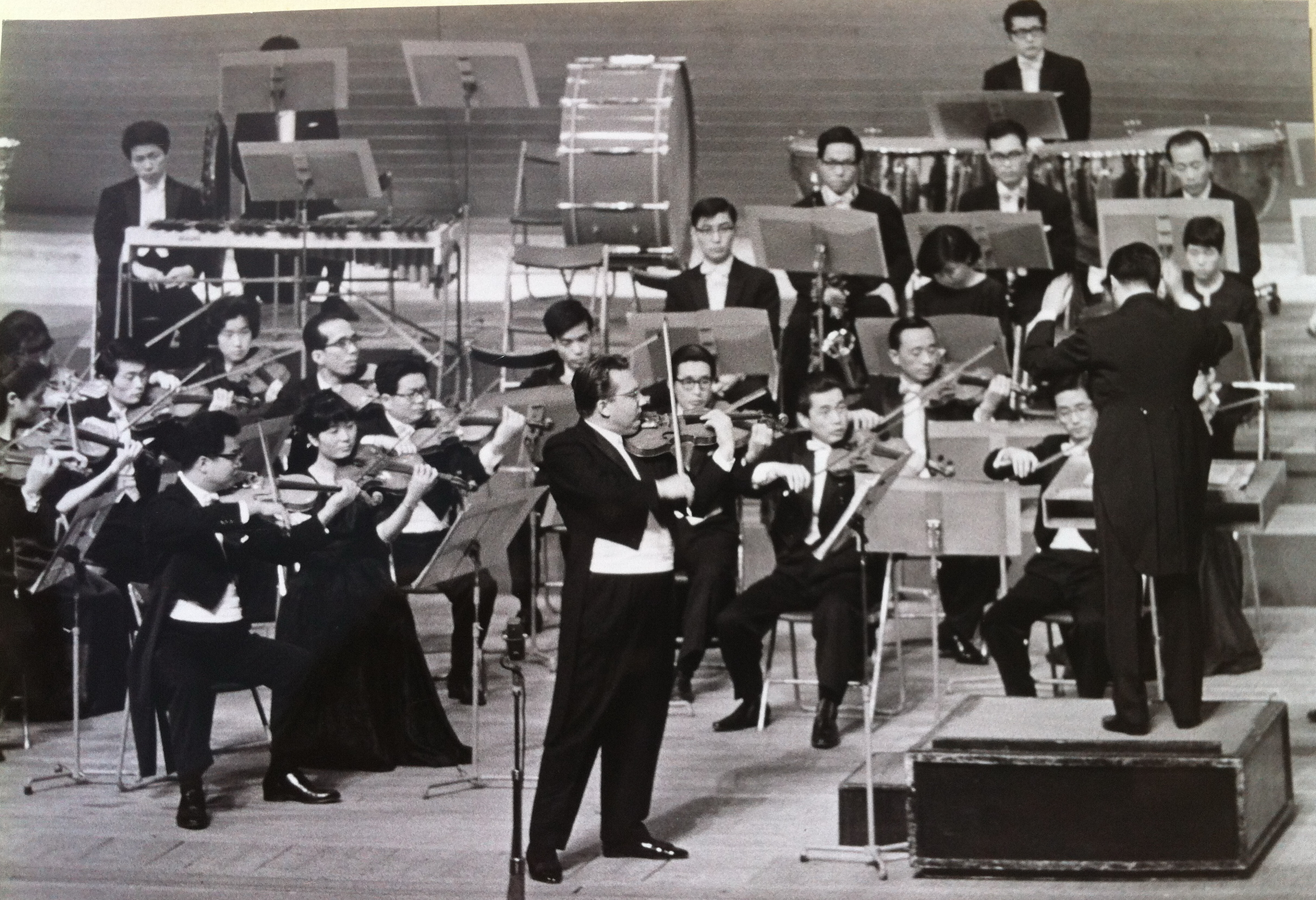
Osaka 1967

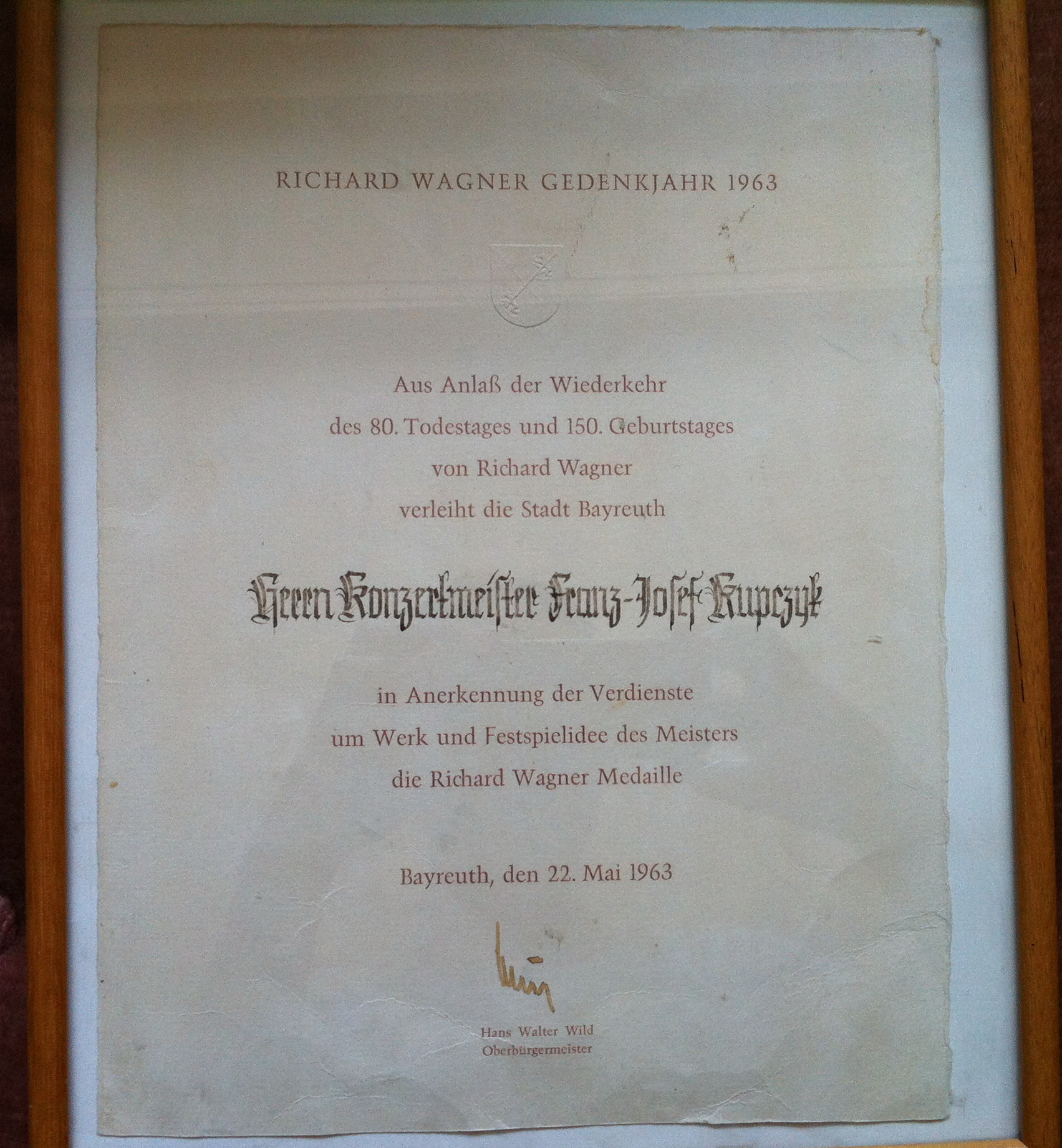
Privatarchiv Kupczyk 2015

Franz-Josef Kupczyk (7 July 1928 – 5 January 2012) was a German violinist and soloist. Since 1957 he was 1st concertmaster of the Bremer Philharmoniker and at the Theater Bremen at Goetheplatz.

== Life ==
Born in Westerholt, Kupczyk began violin lessons at the age of nine and attended the boarding school in Braunschweig for musical talents from 1942 to 1945. After the end of the war, he went to the Folkwang University of the Arts in Essen, the Cologne and Detmold Universities and studied with Fritz Peter, Hermann Zitzmann, Tibor Vaga, and Max Strub.

In 1957, he was engaged by the then general music director Heinz Wallberg as 1st concertmaster in Bremen. There he performed as 1st concertmaster of the Philharmonic State Orchestra until 1996 under renowned conductors such as Hans Schmidt-Isserstedt, Lorin Maazel, Peter Schneider, Sergiu Celibidache and Paul Hindemith, Hans Knappertsbusch and Rudolf Kempe.

In particular, he performed the Brahms Double Concerto with Peter Schwarze, the Schumann Violin Concerto and the Shostakovich Concerto under Rudolf Kempe, the Stravinsky's Violin Concerto under Woldemar Nelsson's conduct, the Karl Amadeus Hartmann's Violin Concerto conducted by Reinhard Petersen, and Bach and Mozart, under Hermann Michael's direction.

In 1962, Rudolf Kempe appointed him as 1st concertmaster in Bayreuth, where he played under Karl Böhm and Hans Knappertsbusch and under the direction of Wieland Wagner.

In 1967, he was appointed for one year as a guest professor at the Tokyo Academy of Music, where he continued to support young Japanese violinists in Bremen until his retirement in 1996. He also gave concerts as a soloist throughout Japan in the sixties. In 1984, he was appointed professor for violin at the Hochschule für Künste Bremen.

He was also involved in the theatre in Bremen. He actively participated in productions by Kurt Hübner and Peter Zadek and travelled through Japan with Reinhild Hoffmann's ensemble, for example.

During his time as concertmaster, he made numerous radio recordings for films and especially with the Nordwestdeutsche Philharmonie at Radio Bremen under the direction of Klaus Bernbacher, with whom he recorded modern works by Stravinsky, Holterdorf and Shostakovich, but also the great classical concerts: Mozart, Mendelssohn, Schumann and Brahms. In the 1980s, he also went on a concert tour as a soloist through Poland, where he performed the Schumann Concerto with the Polish Philharmonic Orchestra, for example in Gdansk with Klaus Bernbacher.

He also gave many concerts in the Bremen Cathedral, i.e. in a spiritual setting, for example with Hans Heinze and Wolfgang Helbich.

== The Kupczyk Quartet ==
Since 1960, the so-called "Kupczyk Quartet" has also existed, consisting of members of the Bremen Philharmonic State Orchestra, which has also been active internationally: in Yugoslavia, for example, it was the only German quartet to be invited to the Orchid Festival. It also played in Athens, Gdansk and Warsaw at the invitation of the Chopin Society Warsaw.
