= Violin Sonata No. 2 (Hindemith) =

Violin Sonata No. 2 Sonate in D
- by Paul Hindemith
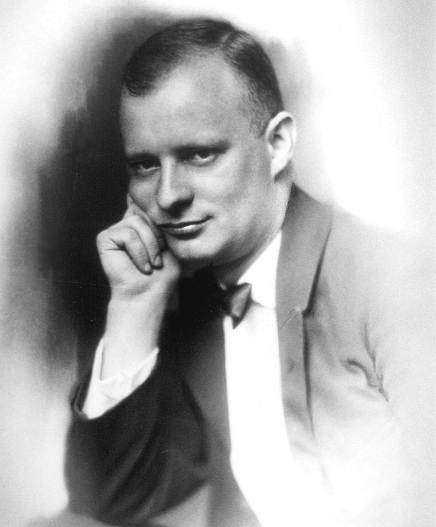
- The composer in 1923
- Opus: 11, No. 2
- Composed: 1918
- Movements: 3

The Violin Sonata No. 2 for piano and violin, in D major, Op. 11, No. 2, is the second surviving violin sonata for the two instruments by Paul Hindemith, composed in 1918. It was published as Sonate in D für Klavier und Violine.

== History ==
Hindemith composed the sonata at the end of the First World War, between September and November 1918. After a youthful first foray into the genre (his 1912–13 sonata for piano and violin is now lost), he returned to it again in 1917. In the years to 1924, he would compose five violin sonatas, three for solo violin, two for piano and violin. In these works, he turned away from late-Romanticism, and towards the alternative models of Johann Sebastian Bach and neo-Baroque composers such as Max Reger. Hindemith originally termed the sonata in question "Sonatine", and numbered it Op. 11, No. 3. He dedicated the piece to a couple from Frankfurt with an interest in the arts, Abdul (Alfred) Linder and his wife Olly.

The work was first performed in Frankfurt on 10 April 1920 by violinist Max Strub and pianist Eduard Zuckmayer. In performance, it lasts approximately 19 minutes.

The sonata was published by Schott in Mainz in 1920. The 24-page manuscript score from Alfred Wolf's estate is kept at the Hindemith Institute in Frankfurt. The work has been included in the Hindemith Complete Edition, edited by Peter Cahn, in 1976, in volume V, 6 (String Chamber Music III).

== Structure and music ==
The sonata is in three movements:

1. Lebhaft
2. Ruhig und gemessen
3. Im Zeitmass und Charakter eines geschwinden Tanzes. Frisch und stets bewegt

The model of Reger shows in the first movement, marked "Lively", with a rich piano part and described as "energetically gripping". It has a marking, like some by Schumann: "Mit starrem Trotz" (with a rigid defiance). The first theme is introduced in unison of both instruments, contrasted by a second theme which is elegant and reminiscent of Debussy. The development includes dance music and "stormy" passages; the coda was described as "still defiant and hard-bitten".

The second movement, marked "Quiet and measured", is dominated by independent lines combined. A lyrical beginning develops to more agitation and passion, showing the composer's "gift for expressive melody".

The final movement is marked "In time and character of a swift dance. Fresh and always moving." The cheerful music has been compared to Erich Korngold's incidental music to Much Ado About Nothing, composed around the same time. It recalls Baroque dances "in a wholly updated way".

== Recordings ==
- Oscar Shumsky (violin) and Mario Bernardi (piano), Doremi 1965/2014
- Ulf Wallin (violin) and Roland Pöntinen (piano), BIS Records 1995
- Ulf Hoelscher (violin) and Benedikt Koehlen (piano), Classic Produktion Osnabrück 1996
- Oleg Kagan (violin) and Sviatoslav Richter (piano), Live Classics 1996
- Ida Bieler (violin) and Kalle Randalu (piano), MDG 1997
- Gidon Kremer (violin) and Andrei Gavrilov (piano), Olympia 2004
- Tanja Becker-Bender (violin) and Péter Nagy (piano), Hyperion Records 2012
- Jill Lawson (violin) and Elliot Lawson (piano), Brilliant Classics 2013/2014
- Roman Mints (violin) and Alexander Kobrin (piano), Quartz Music 2019

== Miscellaneous ==
The violin sonata is on the literature list, category "Duo: piano and one string instrument", of Jugend musiziert.
