= Lesná (Znojmo District) =

- Municipality
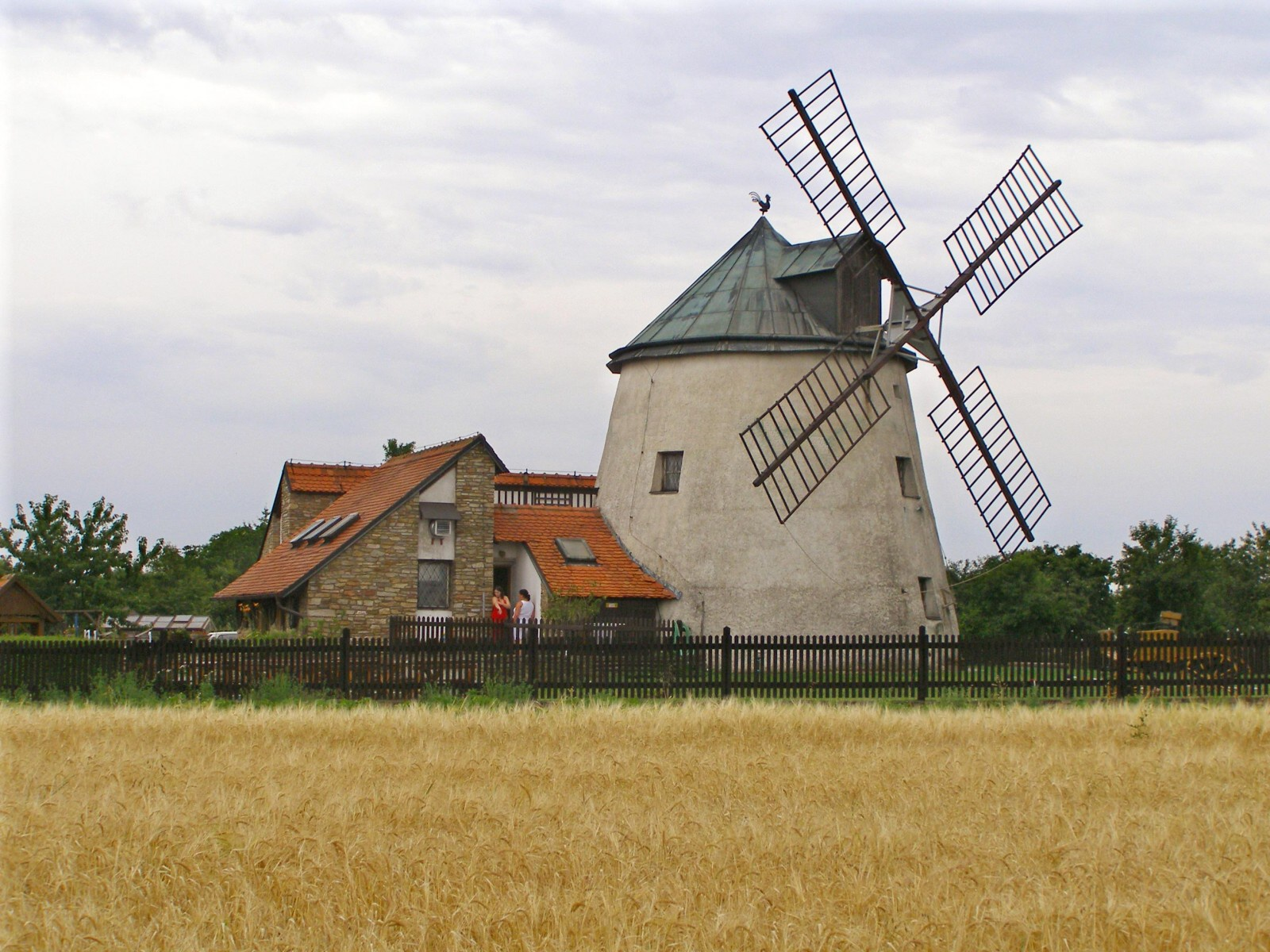
- Windmill in Lesná

- Flag Coat of arms

- Location in the Czech Republic
- Coordinates: 48°54′26″N 15°52′7″E
- Country: Czech Republic
- Region: South Moravian
- District: Znojmo
- Founded: 1794

Area
  - Total: 3.43 km^{2} (1.32 sq mi)
- Elevation: 463 m (1,519 ft)

Population (2026-01-01)
  - Total: 251
  - Density: 73.2/km^{2} (190/sq mi)
- Time zone: UTC+1 (CET)
  - Summer (DST): UTC+2 (CEST)
- Postal code: 671 02
- Website: www.obec-lesna.eu

Lesná (German: Liliendorf) is a municipality and village in Znojmo District in the South Moravian Region of the Czech Republic. It has about 300 inhabitants.

Lesná lies approximately 14 kilometres (9 mi) north-west of Znojmo, 64 km (40 mi) south-west of Brno, and 168 km (104 mi) south-east of Prague.

== Demographics ==
Historical population
Year	Pop.	±%
1869	427	—
1880	422	−1.2%
1890	387	−8.3%
1900	375	−3.1%
1910	373	−0.5%
1921	313	−16.1%
1930	360	+15.0%
1950	345	−4.2%
1961	409	+18.6%
1970	365	−10.8%
1980	322	−11.8%
1991	284	−11.8%
2001	280	−1.4%
2011	268	−4.3%
2021	241	−10.1%
Source: Censuses

== Notable people ==
- August Reuß (1871–1935), German composer
