= Werner Grobholz =

German violinist (1942–2021)

Werner Grobholz (Munich, Bavaria, Germany, 20 April 1942 – Germany, 16 February 2021) was a German violinist.

== Life ==
Born in Munich, Grobholz studied with Werner Heutling, Max Strub and Wilhelm Isselmann at the Musikhochschule Detmold and in Munich with Otto Büchne. He then became 1st concertmaster of the Munich Philharmonic. As a soloist, he played under the directions of conductors Rudolf Kempe and Sergiu Celibidache and with the Academy of St Martin in the Fields. In 1979, he founded the Álvarez piano quartet.

== Recordings ==
- 5 Violinkonzerte (1979)
- Der Garten der Liebe (1981)
- Oktette mit Baryton (1982)
- Konzertante Sinfonien (1988)
- Musik für Streicher (1995)
- Münchner Komponistinnen aus Klassik und Romantik (1999)
