= Willy Horváth =

German violinist (1917–2011)

Willy Horváth (6 July 1917 – 11 March 2011) was a German violinist.

== Life ==
Horváth was born in 1917 as the son of the Hungarian-born concertmaster Seby Horváth (1883–1954) in Nuremberg. From 1927 to 1937, he received violin lessons from his father at the municipal conservatory of his home town. After his Abitur at the Humanist grammar school, he did his military service from 1937 to 1939 and began studying violin with Max Strub at the Berlin University of the Arts in 1938/39. From 1940 to 1945, he continued his studies with Wolfgang Schneiderhahn at the University of Music and Performing Arts Vienna.

After the Second World War, he appeared as a concert violinist with the Nuremberg Symphony Orchestra. He also played in his father's Nuremberg string quartet. In 1955, he founded his own string quartet.

In 1949, he succeeded his father as teacher (later Professor) for violin and chamber music at the Hochschule für Musik Nürnberg. In addition, he was a member of the artists' association.

Horváth was married and father of two children. After his death at the age of 93, he was buried at the Johannisfriedhof in Nuremberg.
