= Jürgen Hinrich Hewers =

German violinist and concertmaster

Jürgen Hinrich Hewers (17 March 1924 – 15 September 2017) was a German violinist and concertmaster.

== Life ==
Born in Königsberg, Hewers took violin lessons from the age of 5 with his father August Hewers (concertmaster of the Königsberg Opera Orchestra and first violinist of the Königsberg String Quartet). Hewers attended the Wilhelms-Gymnasium of his home town. In 1940, he began studies with Max Strub in Berlin, which he continued with Gustav Havemann. In 1942, he made his debut with Paganini's Violin Concerto in D Major as soloist in a Königsberg Symphony Concert under the musical direction of Wilhelm Franz Reuss. Subsequently, he also performed in other major cities of the German Empire (Berlin, Munich, Frankfurt, Dresden and Breslau) as well as in the East Prussian province. In the same year, he was called up for military service in the Wehrmacht. Released for health reasons, he spent the end of the Second World War as Standesbeamter in Ostseebad Rauschen.

In 1945, he became 1st concertmaster at the Theatre Altenburg Gera as successor of Heinrich Schachtebeck. From 1946 to 1948, he was active in the Loh-Orchester Sondershausen. Afterwards, he became 1st concert master at the Anhaltisches Theater in Dessau. In 1951/52, he took over the post of Second 1st concertmaster at the Gewandhaus orchestra Leipzig. During his Leipzig years, he also taught at the University of Music and Theatre Leipzig. Afterwards, he was engaged as 1st concertmaster at the Berliner Symphoniker in East Berlin.

In 1957, he went to the Federal of Germany and worked with the Niedersächsisches Symphonie-Orchester in Hanover as well as in Ulm and Braunschweig. From 1962 until his retirement, he was first concertmaster of the Schleswig-Holsteinisches Landestheater und Sinfonieorchester.

Hewers was a member of the masonic lodge Leuchte im Norden in Flensburg. He died there at the age of 93.
