= Walter Trampler =

German violist (1915 - 1997)

Walter Trampler (August 25, 1915 – September 27, 1997) was a German musician and teacher of the viola and viola d'amore.

Born in Munich, he was given his first lessons at age six by his violinist father. While still in his youth, he played well enough to tour Europe as violist of the prestigious Strub Quartet. In the mid-1930s, he recorded with Max Strub and Florizel von Reuter (violins) and Ludwig Hoelscher (cello) (i.e. the second formation of the Strub Quartet) and Elly Ney (piano). Later, he was principal violist of the Berlin Radio Symphony Orchestra. He left the quartet and emigrated to the United States in 1939. After U.S. Army service in World War II he returned to music, teaching, performing, and recording. In 1947, Trampler became a founding member of the New Music Quartet. He was a founding member of The Chamber Music Society of Lincoln Center, and succeeded David Schwartz as violist of the Yale Quartet with Broadus Erle and Syoko Aki (violins) and Aldo Parisot (cello). In concert, Trampler appeared with chamber groups including the Beaux Arts Trio, the Guarneri Quartet, the Budapest String Quartet, and the Juilliard String Quartet.

His musical interest spanned several centuries, from Baroque to 20th-century works, even inspiring Luciano Berio to write a piece for him. In 1978, Trampler was the viola soloist in the premiere of Simon Bainbridge's viola concerto. He made numerous recordings. In addition to performing extensively in Europe and the United States as a soloist and a chamber musician, he also taught many students at Juilliard, the Peabody Conservatory, the New England Conservatory, the Yale School of Music (see this), Boston University, and the Mannes School of Music. For much of his career, Trampler performed on a viola made by the brothers Antonio and Heironymous Amati, c.1620. He also played a viola made by Samuel Zygmuntowicz.

He died in Port Joli, Nova Scotia, Canada, in 1997.
