= Ewald Lassen =

German classical violinist (1911–?)

Ewald Lassen (20 July 1911–?) is a German classical violinist.

== Life ==
Lassen was born in Hamburg in 1911. He attended the Aufbaugymnasium in his home town and received violin lessons from 1927 to 1931 from Jan Gesterkamp at the Brahms Conservatory. He then studied with Max Strub in Berlin.

From 1935 to 1937 he was deputy concert master at the Staatstheater Schwerin. From 1937 to 1939, he held the 1st concert master position at the Municipal Orchestra Gießen-Bad Nauheim. In 1939, he became violinist of the Frankfurter Opern- und Museumsorchester. In 1940, he was called up for military service. Until 1949, he stayed a prisoner of war. After that, he played with the 2nd violins of the Frankfurt museum orchestra. He was also editor of works by Mozart and Haydn.

In 1951, he married Ilse Achenbach. His brother Harald Lassen (1908-1959) was a philosopher and psychologist.
