= Byeongso Ahn =

Korean violinist, conductor and composer

- 안병소
- Born: 1 December 1911; Seoul, Korea
- Died: 6 March 1979 (aged 67)
- Education: Berlin University of the Arts
- Occupations: Violinist, conductor, composer, music educator
- Spouse: Aenae Lee

Byeongso Ahn (Korean: 안병소; 1 December 1911 – 6 March 1979) was a Korean violinist, conductor, composer, and music educator. He was one of the most important personalities of Western classical music in his country. He gave the first violin concerto and probably also made the first violin recording with Western music in Korea.

== Life ==
Born in Seoul, Ahn came from an artistic family; his grandfather Joongshic "Shimjeon" Ahn was a court painter. His father, Myungho Ahn, was one of the first Korean students in the United Kingdom and then worked as a language teacher in his home country. Ahn was most likely born in 1911. His father gave him a violin, which he tried to learn to play by himself. Later, the Czech violinist and conductor Josef Huss was his teacher in Seoul.

Probably in 1929 he went to Japan, where he learned from the Russian violinist Eugene Krein. In the early 1930s, he received music theory lessons from the German composer, pianist, and conductor Josef Linke. His most important teacher, however, was the Russian violinist Alexander Mogilevsky.

In 1934, the talented musician went to Germany, where he first took up private studies with Willy Hess. He later enrolled at the Berlin University of the Arts. There, Max Strub became an important teacher. He also received lessons at the Musikhochschule with among others Gustav Malke, Fritz Stein, Eta Harich-Schneider and Paul Hindemith. During the 1936 Summer Olympics, he played as an external member of the Berliner Philharmoniker under the direction of Richard Strauss. In Berlin, he also acquired skills in musical instrument making

In 1938, he returned to Japanese-occupied Korea. Probably from 1939 he worked as a musician in Manchuria. There, he also used the name "Heitho Ahn". In the 1940s, he worked as a teacher at the music academy of Yun-ak-won. After Korea's independence, his conducting activities began, so he conducted the Seoul Philharmonic Orchestra at the founding ceremony of Gukhoe. In 1950, he became music director of the Daehan Philharmonic Orchestra. After the outbreak of the Korean War, among others, he held a martial music post.

In the 1950s, he began his intensive creative phase as a composer, with his oldest surviving work dating from 1939. He also resumed his conducting career after the war, for example as a guest conductor with the KBS Symphony Orchestra. He continued to work as a music educator and his students included Pongnyŏl Chŏng, Haeyeop Yang, Un-chang Baek, Chang-hwan Kim, Young-gi Ahn, Su-chul Lee, Mi-Young Park, Kyung Wha Chung and Dong-Suk Kang.

He was married to the pianist Aenae Lee (b. 1908). After his brother Byeongdo Ahn was disgraced by General Park Chung Hee during the military coup of 1961, Byeongso Ahn became more and more isolated as a member of the family. His plan to leave the country failed.

Byeongso Ahn died at age 67.
