= Walter Kolneder =

Austrian musicologist and violist (1910-1994)

Walter Kolneder (1 July 1910 – 30 January 1994) was an Austrian musicologist and violist.

== Life and career ==
Kolneder was born in Wels, Upper Austria. From 1925 to 1935 he studied music with Bernhard Paumgartner (conducting), Theodor Müller (violin) and Friedrich Frischenschlager (composition) at the Mozarteum in Salzburg. He also attended a master class for viola with Max Strub and was a member of the Mozarteum Orchestra Salzburg (1929-1936). Privately he studied composition with Johann Nepomuk David in Wels from 1927 to 1929. In 1934/35, he began musicological studies at the University of Vienna. In 1936 he became head of department at the Conservatory of the Musikverein für Steiermark and in 1939 lecturer at the State College for Music Education in Graz-Eggenberg. Kolneder was a member of NSDAP.

In the post-war period, he was initially active as a conductor in Wels. From 1947 to 1953, he was deputy principal violist at the Tiroler Symphonieorchester Innsbruck. He continued his studies with Wilhelm Fischer at the University of Innsbruck and in 1949 he was awarded the doctorate with his dissertation Die vokale Mehrstimmigkeit in der Volksmusik der österreichischen Alpenländer.

Kolneder taught at the Conservatoire de Luxembourg from 1953 to 1959. In 1956, he qualified as a professor of musicology with a thesis on Antonio Vivaldi at the Saarland University in Saarbrücken, where he became Privatdozent. From 1959 to 1965 he was director of the Akademie für Tonkunst (Darmstadt). From 1960 he also taught in Gießen. Between 1966 and 1972 he was rector of the Hochschule für Musik Karlsruhe. He became extraordinary professor for musicology at the University of Karlsruhe in 1966 and founded the Institute for Musicology. He retired in 1974.

Kolneder was engaged in the history and repertoire of violin playing. He published studies on Antonio Vivaldi and Anton Webern. He also edited the complete edition of Tomaso Albinoni's instrumental music. Furthermore, he dedicated himself to the Austrian folk music. In addition, he published baroque instrumental music of the 17th and 18th century and its arrangements.

Kolneder died in Karlsruhe at the age of 84.

== Awards ==
- 1986: Kulturpreis des Landes Oberösterreich for music

== Work ==
- Aufführungspraxis bei Vivaldi. First published in 1955, New edition by Amadeus Verlag 1999, ISBN 3-905049-14-7.
- Das Buch der Violine. Atlantis Musikbuch, ISBN 3-254-00147-8.
- Antonio Vivaldi, Dokumente seines Lebens und Schaffens. Heinrichshofen, Wilhelmshaven, ISBN 3-7959-0273-8.
- Die Kunst der Fuge. Mythen des 20. Jahrhunderts. Heinrichshofen, Wilhelmshaven 1977, ISBN 3-7959-0178-2.
- Johann Sebastian Bach. Lebensbilder. Lübbe Verlag, ISBN 3-7857-0382-1.
- Lübbes Bach-Lexikon (Bastei-Lübbe-Taschenbuch Band 61288), Lübbe Verlag, Bergisch Gladbach 1994, ISBN 3-404-61288-4.
- Musikinstrumentenkunde Ein Studien- und Prüfungshelfer. Heinrichshofen, Wilhelmshaven, ISBN 3-7959-0159-6.
- Geschichte der Musik. Ein Studien- und Prüfungshelfer. Heinrichshofen, Wilhelmshaven, ISBN 3-7959-0157-X.
- Schule des Generalbassspiels. Part I: The instrumental music. First publication 1983, Heinrichshofen, Wilhelmshaven, ISBN 3-7959-0332-7.
- Singen nach Noten. Praktische Musiklehre für Chorsänger zum Erlernen des Vom-Blatt-Singens. (Edited with Karl Heinz Schmitt), Schott Verlag, 2 volumes, ISBN 3-7957-2556-9 and ISBN 3-7957-2557-7.
