= Helge Jörns =

German composer

Helge Jörns (born 18 March 1941) is a German composer and music educator.

== Life ==
Born in Mannheim, the son of the composer Helmuth Jörns, he spent his childhood and early youth in Mannheim. From 1956 until his Abitur in 1962, he worked as organist and cantor in Alsfeld in Hesse. Until 1966, he studied at the Hochschule für Musik Detmold Composition and conducting as well as at the Tonmeisterinstitut with the main instrumental subjects piano and cello.

In 1966, he moved to Berlin and studied musicology at Technische Universität Berlin until 1971.

From 1966 to 1997, he worked as first sound engineer at the Rundfunk im amerikanischen Sektor Berlin with more than 300 record and CD productions as well as from 1967 to 1971 as music reviewer for the daily newspaper Die Welt. up a teaching position for music composition and counterpoint as successor of Ernst Pepping at the church music school of the Evangelisches Johannesstift Berlin. In 1978, he moved to the Bischöfliche Kirchenmusikhochschule Berlin (Department of Church Music of the Archdiocese of Berlin) as a lecturer in composition, a post he held until 1988. Guest professorships also took him to Melbourne, Sydney, Helsinki, Istanbul and Ankara.

From 1994 to 1997, he worked as 1st sound engineer at Deutschlandfunk Kultur and since then has devoted himself exclusively to composing.

== Awards and prizes ==
Johann-Wenzel-Stamitz-Preis, Deutsche Akademie Rom Villa Massimo, Rostrum of Composers (UNESCO), Deutscher Schallplattenpreis, Ford Foundation.

== Work ==
- Europe and the Bull (1988), opera in 2 parts (18 singers, choir, orchestra); first performance: 17 August 1988 Berlin; Ms. ((Mv. Intermezzo)); S: CD, collegno; Note: new version 1999
- Der Aquädukt (1987), scenic oratorio (solos, choir, orchestra); WP: 1990 Vienna; Ms. (composer's publication mat.); B: ZDF and ORT Ms. and Sdg.; Note: edited by Maximilian Kolbe.
- Spiel von Liebe und Zufall (1991), opera in 3 acts (solos and orchestra); first performance: 1993 Schwetzingen/Karlsruhe; Ms. ((Mv. Intermezzo); B: DAT at Süddeutscher Rundfunk.
- The Marrakech Cat fantastic opera in five parts for children from 8 to 88 (solos, choir, ballet and orchestra); WP: 1994/95 Halle, Saale; Ms. (Mv. Intermezzo)); B: U-MATIC, Fs
- Trio 1991,(Symphony No. 1) Ow. (Wind Quintet, String Quintet, Orchestra); First performance: 1992 Berliner Philharmoniker; Ms. (composer's recording mat.); B: DAT Berliner Philharmonisches Orchester
- Concerto grosso Ow. (wind quintet and orchestra); First performance: 1998 Schwerin; Ms. ((Mv. Intermezzo)); B: DLR (DAT)
- Dezett, Kmk. (Fl., 2 Ob., 2 Kl., 2 Rg., 2 Hn., Kb.); First performance: 1994 Moscow; Ms. (publication mat. with the composer); B: DAT with SDR
- Florindo and the unknown, burlesque opera in 3 parts, original libretto: Hugo von Hofmannsthal, 2.2.2.2.- 4.3.3.1., timpani, percussion, strings, MCh, solos (Mv. Intermezzo)
- String trios, string quartets; piano quartets; solo concerts 3 x violin, 1 x cello, 1 harpsichord, 1 violin, 1 flute; piano quintet;
- Per un poc di pace, cantata, premiere: 1978 Berlin, Sing-Akademie zu Berlin, Philharmonie Berlin
- Jewish Friends, cantata
- 3 symphonies; 4 operas; solo and chamber music; piano Lieder;
- Ein Liebeslied der Alma
- Chorwerke, masses
