= August Reuß =

German composer

August Reuß (6 March 1871 – 18 June 1935) was a German composer.

== Life ==
Reuß was born in Liliendorf, Moravia. His father ran a railway construction company, and his grandfather had worked as a teacher and organist in Würzburg, Lower Franconia. He joined his father's company after his secondary school years in Ingolstadt. Due to his father's early death, Reuß had to wait until 1899, before he could finally start studying music with Ludwig Thuille in Munich after a long period of self-taught activity. Reuß worked as Kapellmeister in Magdeburg and Augsburg, but had to interrupt due to illness. In 1909, he settled in Munich as a freelance musician. He became co-founder of the Trapp School of Music (1927), the forerunner of today's Richard-Strauss-Konservatorium München, and worked there as a teacher of composition. In 1929, he was appointed to the Akademie der Tonkünste, of which he remained a member and teacher until his death.

Autobiographical notes, reports critical of culture, and a manuscript of a theory of function (Funktionslehre) have survived. A high conception of the ethos of art determined his thinking and work. The main focus of his compositional work was chamber music and song, supplemented by symphonic poems and two stage works. His often austere, sensitive tonal language is similar to his contemporaries Max Reger and Hans Pfitzner, in clearly thought-out forms, idiosyncratic voice leading and pithy harmony.

Reuß died in Munich at the age of 64.

== Work ==
In the years after the First World War, Reuß turned away from new musical trends. Since then, he wrote in a simple, transparent style. Especially in pieces for smaller instrumentations he realised his tonal language, which differed greatly from his early expansive late romantic works, which were strongly based on altered harmonies.

Reuß broke away from the voluptuous, pathetic romanticism of the turn of the century and achieved an independent tonal language of subtle differentiation of means of expression, often overpowering by strong ideas. In the works of the mature period, he also achieved diatonic relaxation of harmony and melody and genuine polyphony. (MGG)

Source for the list of works:

=== Stage music ===
- Herzog Philipps Brautfahrt (after Hanns von Gumppenberg), Opernlustspiel 3 acts (1909 Graz).
- Glasbläser und Dogaressa (after Robert Laurency), Romantische Ballettpantomime op. 46 (1926 Munich).
- Laterne und Mantel, Pantomime op. 47 (1924).

=== Orchestral work ===
- Johannisnacht. Tondichtung für Orchester, op. 19
- Judith. Tondichtung für Orchester nach Hebbels gleichnamiger Tragödie, op. 20
- Sommer-Idylle, op. 39
- Serenade für Violine und kleines Orchester. op. 41
- Piano Concerto, op. 48

=== Music for piano ===
- Piano Sonata, op. 27
- Fantasie in A minor for two pianos, op. 42
- Goldammer. Ein Stimmungsbild für Klavier., op. 43,1
- Kleine Sonate für Klavier, op. 55

=== Chamber music ===
- Quintet in F minor, op. 12
- Strin Quartet in D minor, op. 25
- Piano Trio, op. 30
- String Quartet in E major (Frühlings-Quartett)' op. 31
- Romantische Sonate für Violine und Klavier, op. 35
- Oktet for 2 oboes, 2 clarinets, 2 horns and 2 bassoons in B major, op. 37

=== Vocal music ===
- Gotenzug (after Felix Dahn) op. 5
- Tag & Nachtgesänge from Gottfried Keller's Buch der Natur (5 songs) op. 7
- 7 Gedichte on texts by Ludwig Jacobowski and Franz Evers, op. 17
- Zwei Melodramen after Heinrich Heine, op. 21
- Sechs Gedichte on texts by Hanns von Gumppenberg, Franz Evers, Conrad Ferdinand Meyer and Ludwig Jacobowski, op. 23
- 3 Gedichte on texts by Franz Evers, Hans Probst and Gustav Falke, op. 28
- 4 Gedichte on texts by Marie Itzerott and Ludwig Jacobowski, op. 29
- Vier Gesänge, op. 32
- Fünf Gedichte, op. 34
- Acht Lieder, op. 36
- Sechs Lieder, op. 44
- Mehrstimmige Kinderlieder, op. 49
- Haec dies, op. 50
- Weihnachtslieder für Jugendchor, op. 58
