= Gerhart von Westerman =

German composer

- Born: 19 September 1894
- Died: 14 February 1963 (aged 68)
- Known for: Berliner Festwochen

Gerhart von Westerman (19 September 1894 – 14 February 1963) was a German composer, artistic director and music writer.

== Life ==
Born in Riga, after graduating from high school Westerman studied composition at the Hochschule für Musik in Berlin, where Paul Juon was his teacher. From 1918 he continued his studies with Walter Courvoisier and August Reuß in Munich and received his doctorate in 1921 with a thesis on "Giovanni Porta als Opernkomponist".

In Munich he became head of department at the radio station in 1925, later at the radio stations in Berlin and Saarbrücken. In 1939 the Berlin Philharmonic appointed him as its artistic director (as successor to Hans von Benda). He held this office until 1945 and then again from 1952 onwards until 1959 from. In 1951 he founded the Berliner Festwochen, which he organized every year from then on until 1959.

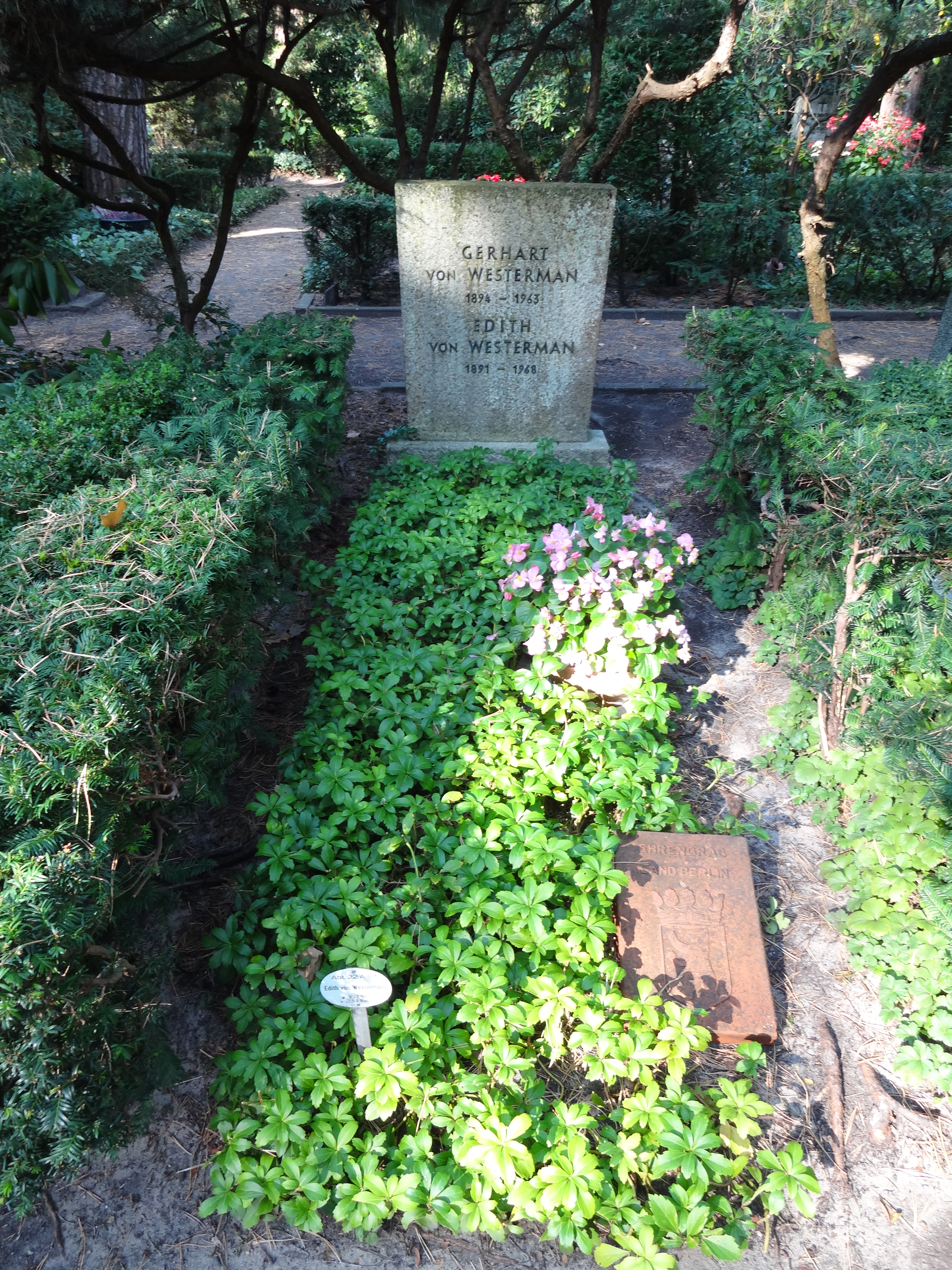
Westerman's grave

Westerman died in Berlin at the age of 68. He is buried at the Waldfriedhof Dahlem. His grave is marked as dedicated as Grave of honour of the state of Berlin

== Works ==
=== Orchestral pieces ===
- Serenade, op. 7, 1928
- Intermezzi, op. 9, 1929
- Divertimento, op. 16, 1940

=== Operas ===
- Prometheische Phantasie, composition and libretto, premiere 1960 in Dortmund
- Rosamunde Floris, libretto, music by Boris Blacher, premiere 1960 in Berlin

=== Books ===
- Das russische Volkslied, wie es heute gesungen wird. Orchis Verlag, 1922
- Knaurs Konzertführer. Droemersche Verlagsanstalt, 1951
- Knaurs Opernführer, Droemersche Verlagsanstalt, 1952

== Awards ==
- 1962: Berliner Kunstpreis
