= Hans-Georg Arlt =

German classical violinist

Hans-Georg Arlt (3 February 1927 – 11 July 2011) was a German classical violinist.

== Life ==
Born in Züllichau, the son of the concert pianist Lotte Kruse (daughter of the music writer Georg Richard Kruse) and of the teacher and violinist Ernst Arlt, after gaining initial experience on the piano, he began to learn violin playing from his father at the age of six. He was taught for ten years by his father, who discovered the gift of absolute pitch with him. After being given the opportunity to play with Max Strub at the age of twelve, he was enrolled as a full student at the Berlin University of the Arts at the age of sixteen in 1943. Arlt played in the Hochschulorchester, which was occasionally conducted by Sergiu Celibidache, who was also a student at the time.

His artistic career was interrupted by the Second World War. After his release from Soviet captivity he was able to continue his work as a violinist. From 1946, he was with the Radio Berlin Tanzorchester for four years (conducting: Horst Kudritzki) and held the post of concertmaster there. At the same time, Arlt played in the orchestra of the Berliner Staatsoper as well as in the orchestra of the Friedrichstadt-Palast. He toured with Werner Müller and his RIAS-Dance Orchestra from 1950 to 1958. In 1959, he was co-founder and concertmaster of the Großes Studio-Orchester Berlin. The task of this orchestra was to provide the concertante framework for the broadcasts of the RIAS and Sender Freies Berlin. He performed at home and abroad as a soloist . Arlt also participated in recordings.

At the request of the producer of EMI-Electrola, Fritz Ganss, he accepted a concertmaster position with the Radio Orchestra of the Radio Forces Françaises de Berlin. With this orchestra, which for legal reasons was designated on records as "Berliner Symphoniker", he also played until the late 1970s on Eurodisc operetta recordings conducted by Werner Schmidt-Boelcke, Robert Stolz and Nico Dostal.

In 1978, he joined the orchestra of the Theater des Westens in Berlin, where he was concertmaster until the end of 1991. Besides Johannes Heesters and Götz Friedrich he was Honorary member of the house.

Arlt died in Berlin at the age of 84.

== Work ==
The breadth of his work can be seen in his activities as a soloist and concertmaster and ranges from opera and stage works to light, film and dance music.
