= Irene Güdel =

Swiss cellist (1930–2023)

Irene Güdel (7 July 1930 – 11 July 2023) was a Swiss cellist. From 1957 to 1995 she taught the cello at the Hochschule für Musik Detmold, from 1969 as professor.

== Life and career ==
Güdel was born in Aegerten on 7 July 1930. She studied violoncello at the Musikschule Konservatorium Bern with Richard Sturzenegger (1905-1976), at the Conservatoire de Paris with André Navarra and completed her artistic training in master classes with Paul Tortelier and Pierre Fournier. She performed concerts in Europe, South America and Japan and was invited by German and Swiss radio stations to make solo and chamber music recordings. From 1953 to 1965 she was a member of the Strub Quartet in Detmold. She died in Detmold on 11 July 2023, at the age of 93.

== Recordings ==
- Vinzenz Lachner – Kammermusik und Klavierwerke, Antes (Bella Musica).
- Carl Philipp Emanuel Bach (1714–1788), Cello Concerto in B flat Major / Georg Philipp Telemann, Suite in B flat Major (Carlos Kleiber/ Rundfunkorchester Hamburg), Profil.

== Publications ==
- Jost Michaels/Irene Güdel: Ferdinand Ries (1784–1838), Sonata in G minor op.125 for violoncello and piano. Ries & Erler, Berlin 1984,
- Jost Michaels/Irene Güdel: Vinzenz Lachner, 6 pièces caractéristiques: No. 1–4. Schott, Mainz 1989.
- Jost Michaels/Irene Güdel: Vinzenz Lachner, 6 pièces caractéristiques: No. 5–6. Schott, Mainz 1989.
- Jost Michaels/Irene Güdel: Peter von Winter, Concertino in E flat major for clarinet, violoncello and orchestra. Sikorski, Hamburg 2005.

== Prizes and awards ==
- First prize of the Conservatoire de Paris, 1952
- Studienpreis des Schweizerischer Tonkünstlerverein 1952 Atlantis Verlag, 1975, p. 75, ISBN 9783761104620
- Kranichsteiner Musikpreis, 1954
- Support prize of the ARD International Music Competition, 1954
