= Bastiaan Quartet =

German string quartet

- Origin: Berlin, Germany
- Genre: Classical
- Years active: 1945–1970
- Past members: Hermann Bethmann; Walter Müller; Hans Bottermund; Werner Haupt

The Bastiaan Quartet was a German string quartet from Berlin (1945-1970). It was named after the primarius Johannes Bastiaan. In 1955, the ensemble won 2nd prize at a competition in Liège. It was represented at festivals in Berlin and Helsinki. Concert tours have taken the quartet to the Netherlands, the United Kingdom, Switzerland, South Africa and Japan.

== Members ==
- 1. Violin: Johannes Bastiaan (1945–1970)
- 2. Violin: Hermann Bethmann (1945–1948) and Johannes Blau (1948–1970)
- Alto: Walter Müller (altist)|Walter Müller (1945–1950), Fritz Steiner (1950–1963) and Giusto Cappone (1963–1970)
- Violoncello: Hans Bottermund (1945–1948), Werner Haupt (1948–1955) and Peter C. Steiner (1955–1970)

== Recordings ==
- Johann Strauss II, Rosen aus dem Süden and Schatz-Walzer, Audite/Deutschlandradio Kultur ?/2012
- Franz Schubert: Der Tod und das Mädchen (string quartet) and quartet movement in C minor, Eterna 1960
