= Lothar Windsperger =

German composer

Lothar Windsperger (22 October 1885 – 30 May 1935) was a German composer as well as long-standing literary editor and publisher at Schott.

== Life and career ==
Born in Ampfing, Windsperger, son of a well-known organist and school teacher, received his first basic musical education from his father, who he lost at the age of five. Windsperger nevertheless remained true to music, even when he first began his training as a primary school teacher in Rosenheim, where he had moved with his mother in 1898, at a taxidermy institute. In 1900 he finally changed to the University of Music and Performing Arts Munich. There he was taught composition and harmony by Josef Rheinberger and Rudolf Louis, among others, and piano by August Schmid-Lindner. Later he continued his studies with Hugo Riemann in Leipzig and work weeks with Hermann Abendroth at the Rheinische Musikschule in Cologne.

In February 1905 Windsperger appeared in Munich with an orchestral concert in which he performed his one-hour, one-movement "Sinfonie der Sehnsucht". According to the judgement of H. Teibler in the Allgemeine Musikalische Zeitung of 24 February 1905 (p. 151), however, he thereby "only provoked the unwillingness of all well-meaning people; this concert was an assassination of the good will of the audience".

In 1913 he accepted an offer to start as a lector at the music publisher B. Schott's Söhne in Mainz. This enabled him to influence the clarification of special questions in the context of the publication of various works as well as the structure, structure and technique of the compositions of other musicians. Among other things, he was also the editor of the works of Josip Štolcer-Slavenski, Ernst Toch and Carl Orff. Windsperger was particularly fascinated by Orff's music educational ideas and his works were subsequently published in their entirety by Schott from 1923 onwards. For this reason, he introduced the Orff Schulwerk in its original version from 1930 to various kindergartens in Mainz. From his position, Windsperger often transcribed entire opera and choral works by other composers. For example, he transcribed a large part of Verdi' or Wagner' operas as well as difficult solo or chamber music compositions by other composers into easily playable piano scores. These new editions, as well as his complete own compositions, were finally published by Schott in the form of anthologies.

In addition to this task, Windsperger worked as a teacher of theory and piano in Mainz and Wiesbaden and finally accepted a position at the Peter Cornelius Conservatory of the city of Mainz in 1933, where he took over the position of director as successor to Hans Gál, who had emigrated after the Nazi's Machtergreifung because of his Hungarian-Jewish descent. One of his most famous pupils here was Rudolf Desch. But only two years later Windsperger died in Franckfurt on 30 May 1935 at the age of 49.

About Windsperger's work as a composer of late romanticism on the way to contemporary music, Anton Würz writes in volume 14 of the Musiklexikon Die Musik in Geschichte und Gegenwart:

"Lothar Windsperger's varied oeuvre bears witness to the creative power and individuality of a serious, internalized artistic personality. Like the greater ones, M. Reger, H. Pfitzner and H. Kaminski, standing between the times, he strove to move from his epochally conditioned late-Romantic starting point to a penetration of traditional forms with new means of expression. His tonal language is often harsh, hardly ever persuasive through external effects, but rich in fine expressive-poetic traits. A strong ethical will of confession speaks from his main works. His violin concerto is often called by Hans Engel: Bruckner consecration and religiousness fulfilled, even more by the sage G. Mahlers. His two great choral works Missa Symphonica and Requiem, published in 1926 and 1930 respectively, were perceived as very important contributions to contemporary music and were acknowledged as testimonies to an outstanding creative power. Characteristic examples of his gift for saying memorable things even in the smallest forms, and at the same time of his way of dealing with new musical language (for example the bitonality), are offered by the Piano Pieces op. 37.

== Compositions ==
- Was die deutschen Kinder singen – eine Blütenlese der heimatlichen Kinderlieder, compiled by a German mother. Set for piano by L. Windsperger. B. Schott's Söhne, Mainz 1914.
- Deutsche Kinder-Lieder. Mit Spielregeln für die Spiellieder, for piano set by L. Windsperger. Based on the original by H. Willebeek Le Maire. B. Schott's Söhne, Mainz 1916.
- Das Buch der Motive aus sämtlichen Opern und Musikdramen Richard Wagners, for piano with superimposed text edited by Lothar Windsperger. B. Schott's Söhne, Mainz 1920.
- Verdi-Album. Ausgewählte Stücke aus den beliebtesten Opern von Giuseppe Verdi, compiled and arranged for piano for 2 hands by Lothar Windsperger. Mainz, B. Schott's Söhne 1920.
- Ode in C minor for viola solo op. 13.2. B. Schott's Söhne, Mainz 1919.
- 15 Improvisationen für Violine solo. [B. Schott's Söhne, Mainz 1920.
- String quartet in G minor. B. Schott's Söhne, Mainz 1920.
- Prélude, aria et final for piano by César Franck. Arrangement by Lothar Windsperger. B. Schott's Söhne, Mainz 1921.
- Der mythische Brunnen, cycle of 7 piano pieces op. 27. B. Schott's Söhne, Mainz 1921.
- 21 Lieder mit Klavierbegleitung op. 25. B. Schott's Söhne, Mainz 1922.
- Rhapsodie-Sonate für Violoncello und Klavier op. 20. B. Schott's Söhne, Mainz 1924.
- Fantasietten-Suite für Klavier op. 35. B. Schott's Söhne, Mainz 1926.
- Missa symphonica für gemischten Chor, Soli, Orchester und Orgel op. 36. B. Schott's Söhne, Mainz 1926.
- Kleine Klavier-Stücke op. 37. B. Schott's Söhne, Mainz 1926.
- Requiem. A symphonic funeral mass for mixed choir, 4 solo voices, orchestra and organ op. 47. B. Schott's Söhne, Mainz 1929.
- Sketchbook for the Album für die Jugend by Robert Schumann. B. Schott's Söhne, Mainz.
- Catalogue of works (in extracts) at B. Schott's Söhne.

== Publications ==
- Das Buch der Motive aus Opern und Musikdramen Richard Wagner's.
