= Armin Knab =

German composer

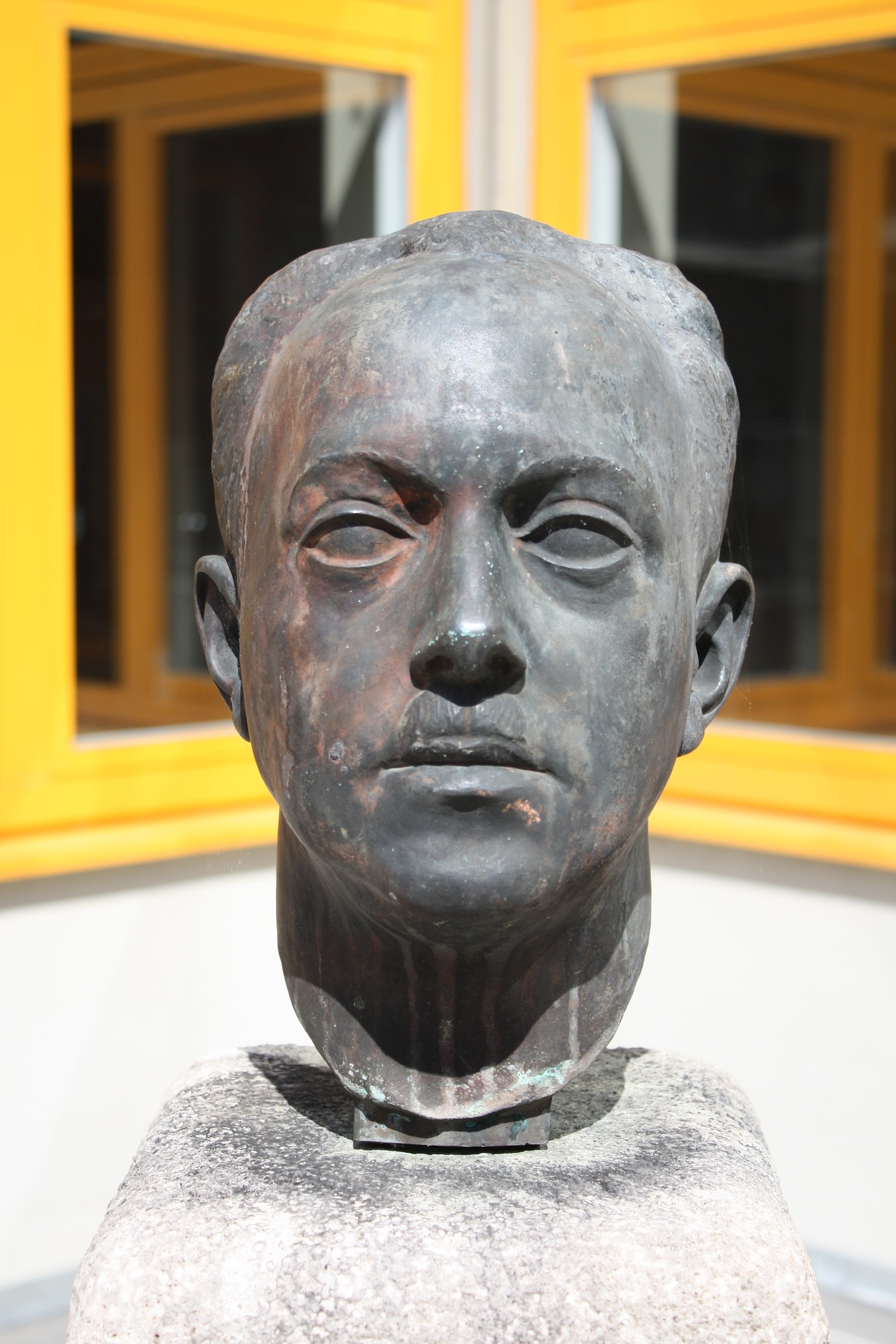
A bust of Armin Knab from the Armin Knab Gymnasium in Kitzingen

Armin Knab (19 February 1881 – 23 June 1951) was a German composer and musical writer.

== Career ==
Knab was born in Oberaurach. His father wished for him to practice law, and Knab joined the bar in 1907. However, at the same time, he studied music theory with Max Meyer-Olbersleben. He worked as a lawyer from 1911 to 1927, when he became a provincial judge in Würzburg. In 1934, he resigned his seat on the bench and joined the Berlin Akademie für Kirchen und Schulmusik as a teacher of theory and composition. He was made a professor there the following year, and received the Max Reger Prize in 1940. In 1943, he left the Akademie to live the remaining years of his life in South Germany.

Knab's most famous works were created for educational purposes. He had originally become famous in the 1920s for his work with the German youth music movement. Knab wrote a great variety of music beyond that though; his works range from simple folk songs to choral pieces for large groups. He also arranged the works of other composers such as Pauliine Volkstein.
