= Jost Raba =

German violinist and music educator

Jost Raba ( 17 August 1900 – 12 February 2000) was a German violinist and music educator.

== Life ==
Raba was born in 1900 as the son of a sales representative and his wife in Freising. He attended high school in Augsburg and studied at the Ludwig-Maximilians-Universität München. From 1917 to 1920 he was taught by Johann Slunicko in Augsburg. From 1920 to 1925, he studied violin with Alexander Petschnikoff and Felix Berber at the University of Music and Performing Arts Munich.

Then, he became teacher for violin and chamber music at the Leopold Mozart Conservatory in Augsburg. Moreover, he worked as solist and chamber musician, among others with the Raba Quartet (1924–1934) and in the Strub Quartet (1934–1938). From 1932 to 1935, he worked freelance. In 1935, he became 1st concertmaster with the orchestra of the Deutschlandsender. In 1942, he took over a full-time teaching position or professorship at the Universität der Künste Berlin. In 1946, he took over a professorship at the University of Music and Theatre Munich. His students included Willi Leininger among others.

Raba, a Roman Catholic, was married and lived in Murnau am Staffelsee. His son Peter Raba (born in 1936) is a photographer.

== Writings ==
- Fundamentale Violintechnik. Eine Sammlung von Meisteretüden mit Beiträgen aus der Violin-Methodik. edited with Franz Moser. Hieber, Munich 1953.
