= Karl Wendling =

German violinist and musical educator

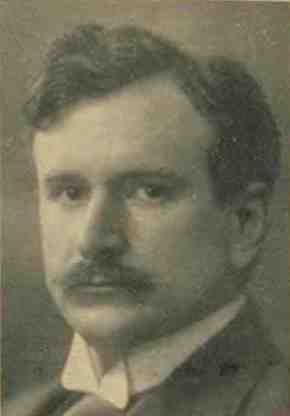
Karl Wendling

Karl/Carl Wendling ([ventling]) (10 August 1875, Strasbourg – 27 March 1962, Stuttgart) was a German violinist and musical educator.

He studied in his hometown with Heinrich Schuster and Florián Zajíc, and later in Berlin with Carl Halir and Joseph Joachim. From 1902 on he was concertmaster at the Bayreuth Festival. In 1907 and 1908, he was concertmaster with the Boston Symphony Orchestra under Karl Muck. He had his own string quartet, "The Wendling Quartet". From 1909 on, he was a teacher at the Royal Stuttgart Conservatory, where he became director in 1929.
