= Karl Höller =

German composer (1907–1987)

Karl Höller (25 July 1907 – 14 April 1987) was a German composer of the late Romantic tradition.

== Biography ==
Karl Höller was born in Bamberg, Bavaria. He came from a musical family on both sides: his father Valentin Höller was the Bamberg Cathedral organist for 40 years, and his grandfather and great-grandfather were organists at Würzburg Cathedral. His aunt Gretchen was the first female organist at Würzburg. His mother was a singer, whose father had been a choir director and musician. He showed aptitude for the organ at an early age. He was a choirboy from age six, and he studied piano, organ and cello in Bamberg. He went to the Würzburg Conservatory where he studied composition under Hermann Zilcher; and to the Munich Academy of Music, where he studied composition with Joseph Haas and Waltershausen, organ with Gatscher, and conducting with Siegfried von Hausegger. After taking his composition and organ examinations in 1929, he became a master-class student of Haas. He taught at the Munich Academy (1933–1937), from 1937 in Frankfurt at the Hoch Conservatory and Hochschule für Musik (1938–1946), and the Munich Conservatory (Hochschule für Musik) (1949–1972; taking over the composition class of his teacher Joseph Haas). In 1942 Höller joined the NSDAP.

He was also president of the Munich Hochschule für Musik from 1954 to 1972.

Höller became a member of the Academy of Arts, Berlin in 1952, and an honorary member of the Bavarian Academy of Fine Arts in 1958.

His compositions are characterized by polyphony and colourful, impressionistic harmony and orchestration. They are redolent of Paul Hindemith, Hans Pfitzner, Max Reger and the French 20th century school. He wrote in a tonal idiom regardless of the prevailing fashions, which meant that he was initially criticised as modernist, and later as a reactionary. His music has been recorded by such artists as Eugen Jochum (Symphonic Fantasy and Sweelinck Variations), Wilhelm Furtwängler (Cello Concerto No. 2, with the Berlin Philharmonic Orchestra) and others.

Karl Höller died on 14 April 1987 in Hausham, Miesbach, Bavaria.

== Works ==
=== Orchestral ===
- Concertino for violin, viola, piano and chamber orchestra, Op. 9 (1930)
- Chamber concerto for violin and orchestra, Op. 10 (1930; revised as Violin Concerto, Op. 23, 1938; new version 1967)
- Divertimento for Chamber Orchestra, Op. 11a (1939)
- Concerto for Organ and Chamber Orchestra, Op. 15 (1930/32; revised 1966)
- Toccata, Improvisations and Fugue (orchestration of Op. 16 for 2 pianos) (1942)
- Hymn on Gregorian Chorales, Op. 18 (1932/34)
- Chamber Concerto for Harpsichord and Small Orchestra or 6 solo instruments (Op. 19, 1933/34; revised 1958)
- Symphonic Variations (or Symphonic Fantasy) on a Theme of Girolamo Frescobaldi, Op. 20 (1935, rev. 1956, 1965)
- Passacaglia and Fugue on a Theme of Frescobaldi, Op. 25 (1938/39)
- 2 cello concertos (No. 1, Op. 26, 1940/41; No. 2, Op. 50, 1949)
- Heroische Musik, Op. 28 (1940)
- 2 little symphonies, Opp. 32a (1965), 32b (1969)
- Concerto grosso for 2 violins and orchestra, Op. 38a (1965; a re-working of the Trio Sonata for 2 violins and piano, Op. 38)
- 2 symphonies (No. 1, Op. 40, 1942–46; No. 2, Op. 65, 1973, "Homage to Mozart")
- Sonata for orchestra, Op. 44a (1966)
- Serenade for chamber orchestra, Op. 46a (1957; rev. for large orchestra 1972)
- Symphonic Concerto for violin and orchestra, Op. 47 (1947/48)
- Fugue for string orchestra (1948; a reworking of the first movement of the String Quartet No. 5, Op. 48)
- Divertimento for flute and strings, Op. 53a (? 1978)
- Sweelinck Variations ("Mein junges Lebe hat ein End"), Op. 56 (1950/51)
- Intrade, Allegro and Fugue, for timpani, percussion and strings, Op. 60 (1962)
- ”Bamberger” Piano Concerto, Op. 63 (1972/73)
- Transcription for orchestra of Franz Schubert's Five German Dances for piano
- Transcription for orchestra of Max Reger’s "Praeludium und Fughetta", Op. 80 (1974)

=== Chamber ===
- 8 violin sonatas (unnumbered, Op. 4, 1929, revised 1968; No. 1, Op. 30, 1942; No. 2 in G minor, Op. 33, 1943 – dedicated to the memory of Alma Moodie, who died in March 1943; No. 3, Op. 35 "Fränkische", 1944; No. 4, Op. 37, 1945; No. 5, Op. 39 "Honegger Sonata", 1946; No. 6, Op. 44, 1947; No. 7, Op. 52, 1949)
- Chamber Trio for 2 violins and piano, Op. 6 (1930)
- Piano Quartet (Op. 7, 1930; revised 1955)
- Divertimento for flute, violin, viola, cello and piano, Op. 11 (1931)
- 6 string quartets (No, 1, Op. 24, 1938, revised 1966; No. 2, Op. 36, 1945; No. 3, Op. 42, 1947 – see also Serenade for Wind Quintet, Op. 42a; No. 4 in C, Op. 43, 1947; No. 5, Op. 48, 1948; 1st movt. Reworked as "Fugue for String Orchestra"; No. 6, Op. 51, 1948)
- Largo appassionato (violin/piano, 1939)
- Music for violin and piano, Op. 27 (1940/41; rev. 1956)
- 2 Cello Sonatas (No. 1, Op. 31, 1943, rev. 1967; or viola and piano; also for Viola and Clarinet, 1967; No. 2, Op. 66, 1976/77)
- Piano Trio in C minor, Op. 34 (1944; also for Harp, Violin, and Cello, Op. 34a, 1966)
- Trio Sonata ‘in the old style’, Op. 38 (2 violins and piano, 1946; rev. as Concerto Grosso for 2 Violins and orchestra, Op. 38a, 1965)
- Serenade for wind quintet, Op. 42a (after the String Quartet No. 3, Op. 42)
- 2 Flute Sonatas (No. 1, Op. 45, 1947; No. 2 in C, Op. 53, 1948)
- Clarinet Quintet in A minor, Op. 46 (1947)
- Fantasy, Op. 49 (violin and organ, 1949)
- Divertimento for 2 violins, viola, cello, double bass and flute, Op. 53a
- Improvisation on the sacred folksong "Schonster Herr Jesu", Op. 55 (cello and organ, 1950; or violin and piano)
- Viola Sonata in E minor, Op. 62, "In memoriam Paul Hindemith" (1966/67)
- Scherzo for wind octet (1972)

=== Piano ===
- Suite, Op. 2
- Op. 46 Nr11
- 3 Little suites, Op. 2a (1975; includes a reworked Suite, Op.2)
- Toccata, Improvisation and Fugue, Op. 16 (2 pianos, 1932, rev. 1966; see also Orchestral)
- Sonatina, Op. 29 (1942)
- 2 Little sonatas for Piano, 4 Hands (Op. 32, 1943)
- 3 Little sonatas (Op. 41, 1946)
- Little Dance (1950)
- 2 Little sonatas for 2 pianos, Op. 41a (1967)
- Tessiner Klavierbuch, Op. 57 (1957/61)
  - Impression; Scherzoso; Elegie; Etude; Notturno; Capriccio ("Kuckuck"); Die Glocken von; Capriasca; Tanz; Epilog
- 2 Sonatinas, Op. 58 (1962)
- Capricious Dance

=== Organ ===
- Suite (1926, Manuscript)
  - Improvisation
  - Mysterium
  - Ave maris stella
  - ...et resurrexit
- Chorale Partita "O wie selig seid ihr doch, ihr Frommen", Op. 1 (1929)
- Chorale Variations "Helft mir Gottes Güte preisen", Op. 22, No. 1 (1936)
- Chorale Variations "Jesu, meine Freude", Op. 22, No. 2 (1936)
- Ciacona in B minor, Op. 54
- Chorale-Passacaglia on "Die Sonn' hat sich mit ihrem Glanz gewendet", Op. 61 (1962)
- Triptychon on the Easter sequence "Victimae paschali laudes", Op. 64
- Chorale Prelude on "Zu Bethlehem geboren"

=== Vocal ===
- Missa brevis, Op. 3 (chorus a cappella, 1929)
- 3 Old German Minnelieder, Op. 5 (1929)
- Motet "Media vita in morte sumus", male choir, tenor and bass solos, Op. 8 (1930)
- Jubilate Deo, for 5- or 8-part choir and organ (1930)
- "Weihnachtsmusik", Op. 12a (female and children's voices, violin and organ; 1931)
- 3 Songs on poems of Thea Graziella (1931)
- Passionmusik, Op. 12b (soprano, female and children's voices, violin and organ; 1932)
- Hymnen, Op. 13 (male chorus, 3 trumpets, timpani and organ, 1932; revised as Hymnischer Gesang for male chorus or mixed chorus and orchestra, Op. 13a)
- Requiem Missa pro defunctis, Op. 14 (chorus and organ, 1931/32)
- Emitte spiritum, choir and organ (1932)
- 6 Sacred songs, Op. 17 (chorus and organ, 1932; version for chorus and piano, 1972)
- Lied zur Fastnacht, 3-part female or children's chorus and piano 4-hands (1933)
- Motet "Tenebrae factae sunt", Op. 21 (male chorus, flute, oboe and clarinet; 1937)
- Weg in die Zukunft, 2-part choir and winds or piano (1939)
- Volk, du bist das Wesen, 3-part choir (1939)
- Summer Night, 5 songs for 4- and 8-part choir a cappella, Op. 59 (1963)

=== Film scores ===
- Raum in kriesenden Licht (1936)
- Antwort des Herzens (written 1949 for a 1950 documentary)

=== Other ===
- Hörspielmusik Cenodoxus, der Doktor von Paris (1933)
- Hörspielmusik Thomas Paine (1934)

== Bibliography ==
- Krapp, Edgar: Karl Höller: Choralvariationen "Jesu, meine Freude" op. 22/2. Musica Sacra 127, no. 6 (2007): 380–384.
- Leitner, Hans: Karl Höller (1907–1987), unter besonderer Berücksichtigung seiner kirchenmusikalischen Beiträge. Musica Sacra 127, no. 6 (2007): 360–362.
- Schnorr, Klemens. Mystik und Virtuosität: Die Orgelmusik von Karl Höller (1907–1987). In: Dux et comes – Festschrift für Franz Lehrndorfer zum 70. Geburtstag, ed. Hans D. Hoffert and Klemens Schnorr, 171–185. Regensburg: Universitätsverlag, 1998. ISBN 3-930480-68-9.
- Suder, Alexander L. (ed.). Karl Höller (= Komponisten in Bayern, vol. 50). Tutzing: H. Schneider, 2007. ISBN 978 3 7952 1227 8.
