= Johannes Driessler =

German composer, organist, and lecturer

- Born: 26 January 1921; Friedrichsthal
- Died: 3 May 1998 (aged 77); Detmold, Germany
- Education: Musikhochschule Köln
- Occupations: Composer; Academic teacher
- Organizations: Musikhochschule Detmold
- Awards: Westfälischer Musikpreis; Kunstpreis des Saarlandes

Johannes Driessler (26 January 1921 – 3 May 1998) was a German composer, organist, and lecturer. He composed operas, chamber music, and especially sacred music both vocal and for organ.

== Life and work ==
Driessler was born in Friedrichsthal on 26 January 1921. He studied from 1939 at the Pädagogische Akademie Dortmund, and from 1940 composition and organ at the Musikhochschule Köln. In November 1940, Driessler enlisted in the military; in 1944 he married Gertrude Ledermann. After World War II, he became a teacher in 1945 in Schondorf am Ammersee. In 1946, he became a lecturer at the newly founded Nordwestdeutsche Musikakademie Detmold. Here he began to focus on composing church music. He left his teaching position in 1950 to focus on composition, but returned in following 1954, becoming a professor in 1958 and vice chancellor in 1960, a post he would retain until 1972. He retired from teaching in 1983.

Driessler is best known for his church music, including oratorios and operas, which was known in parts of western Germany but never attained international recognition. These include the oratorio Dein Reich komme, described by Werner Oehlmann as "an example of ascetic music featuring religious symbolism" ("Beispiel religiös-symbolistischer, klangasketischer Musik"). Driessler wrote many organ chorales, predominantly collected in Orgelsonaten durch das Kirchenjahr (Organ sonatas through the liturgical year). He also composed for harpsichord, including Akrostichon (Op. 56; 1967), which repeats the motives in an "'acrostic-like' technique". He was also known for his chamber music.

His work is described by Hanspeter Krellmann in his Grove Music Online entry as traditional, tonal and contrapuntal. The composer is included in Oehlmann's 1961 survey of atonal and twelve-tone music. Wolf-Eberhard von Lewinski and Donald Mintz, in a 1965 survey of contemporary German music, describe his work with others as "moderate modernism with a Hindemithian flavor but also pregnant individual traits". A contemporary reviewer for Music & Letters describes his music as containing "slightly acid dissonance", akin to Hindemith.

His work was published by Bärenreiter and Breitkopf & Härtel.

He was in 1959 the first recipient of the Westfälischer Musikpreis, and was awarded the Kunstpreis des Saarlandes in 1962.

Driessler died in Detmold on 3 May 1998, at age 77.

== Works ==
Sources:

- Sinfonia Sacra
- Dein Reich komme, oratorio, Op. 11 (1950)
- Claudia amata, lyric opera, Op. 17 (premiered 1952 Münster)
- Prinzessin Hochmut, fairy-tale opera, Op. 21 (premiered 1952 Kassel)
- Der Umfried, opera (premiered 1957)
- Doktor Luzifer Trux, opera (premiered 1958)
- Three Small Pieces for cello and piano, Op. 8
- Vier kleine Stücke für Flöte und Klavier (Four Little Pieces for Flute and Piano), Op. 8 No. 2 (1948)
- Duo for violin and cello
- Fantasy for cello and piano, Op. 24 No. 2
- Fünf Stücke (Five Pieces) for viola and piano, Op. 24 No. 3b (1952)
- Sonata for solo viola, Op. 3 No. 1 (1946)
- 20 Chorale Sonatas, Op. 30 (1955)
- Altenburger Messe, Op. 33 (1955)
- Markus passion a capella (1956)
- Cello Sonata, Op. 41 No. 2
- Ikarus, sinfonia da camera (1960)
- Concerto for String trio and Orchestra, Op. 54 (1963)
- Tripartita for viola and harpsichord, Op. 58 No. 3 (1966)
- Symphony No. 3, Op. 63 (1969)
