= Feyerabend =

Feyerabend is a German surname. Notable people with the surname include:

- Erich Feyerabend (1889–1945), German painter
- Gerhard Feyerabend (1898–1965), German WWII general in the Wehrmacht
- Henry Feyerabend (1931–2006), Canadian Adventist evangelist, singer, and author
- Markus Feyerabend (born 1971), German glider aerobatic pilot
- Paul Feyerabend (1924–1994), Austrian philosopher of science
- Sigmund Feyerabend (1528–1590), German printer
