= Ina Seidel =

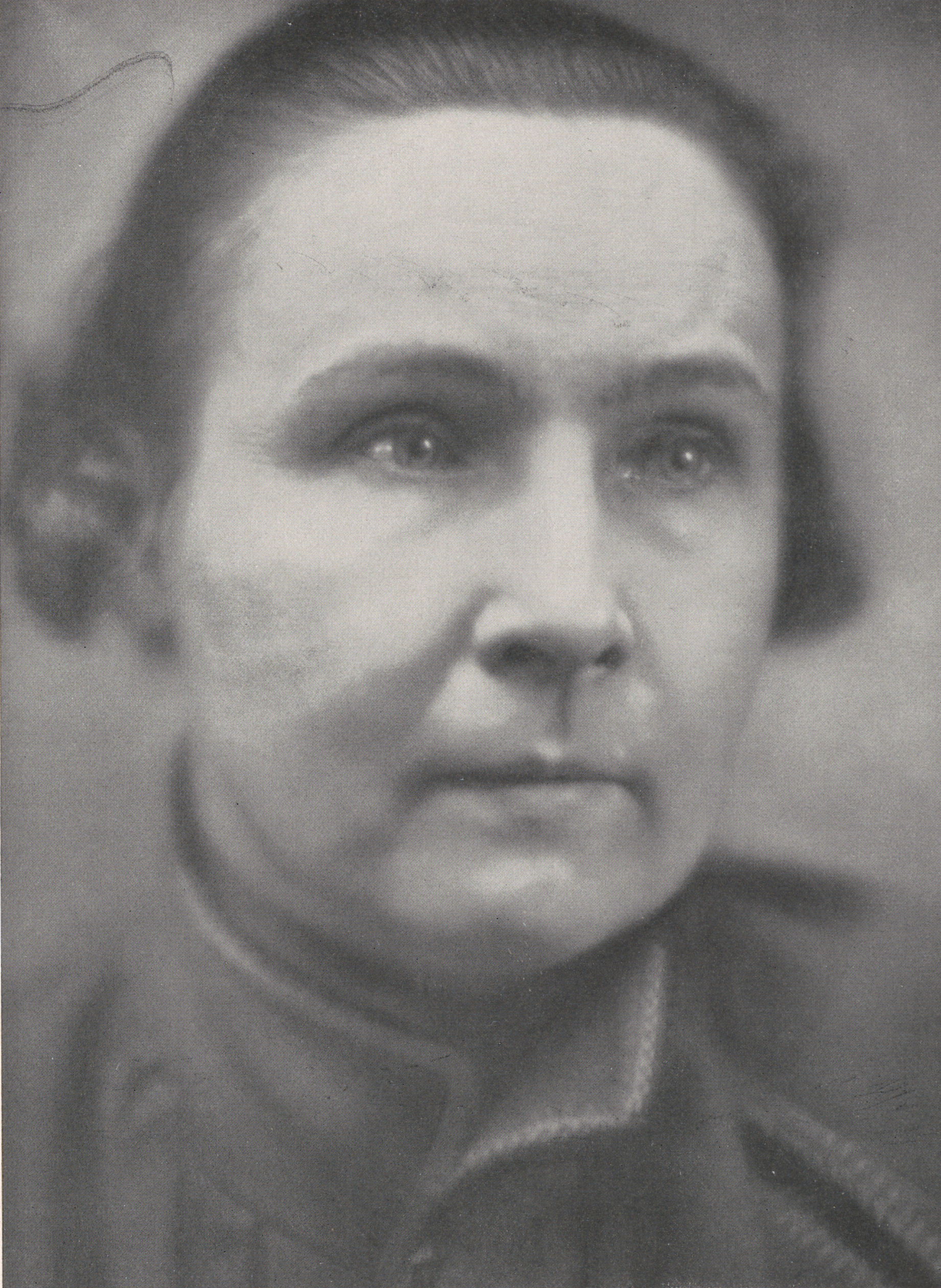
- Born: Johanna Mathilde Seidel; 15 September 1885; Halle, Saxony, Prussia, Germany
- Died: 3 October 1974 (aged 89); Ebenhausen (Schäftlarn), Munich, Bavaria, West Germany
- Occupations: Lyric poet Novelist
- Spouse(s): Heinrich Wolfgang Seidel (1876-1945) (spouse and cousin: hence the shared pre-marriage family name)
- Children: Heilwig Seidel / Schulte-Strathaus (1908-); Ulrike Seidel (1915-1918); Georg Heinrich Balthasar Seidel (1919-1992)
- Parent(s): Hermann Seidel (1855–1895); Emma Auguste "Emmy" Loesevitz (1861–1945)

Ina Seidel (15 September 1885 – 3 October 1974) was a German lyric poet and novelist. In 1930, she published the novel generally regarded as her most famous work, Das Wunschkind ("The Wished-For Child"); two years later she became the third female writer admitted to the Prussian Academy of Arts. Her reputation has been shadowed by her enthusiastic support of Adolf Hitler and the Nazi Party. In 1933 she was one of 88 artists to swear the Vow of Total Loyalty ("Gelöbnis treuester Gefolgschaft") to Hitler. Seidel provided a celebratory poem on the occasion of the Führer's birthday in 1939 and was personally named in Joseph Goebbels' 1944 God-Graced List ("Gottbegnadeten List") of artists considered crucial to German culture. She has maintained some relevance in German popular culture despite a dramatic post-1945 decline in popularity.

== Biography ==
=== Family provenance ===
Johanna Mathilde "Ina" Seidel was born in Halle, to Hermann Seidel and Emmy Loesevitz, the eldest of her parents' three children. Half a year later, the family relocated to Braunschweig for the next ten years. Her father, Seidel was a senior surgeon at the city's main hospital. His suicide in 1895 left his widow and her children to live in seriously reduced circumstances. After her father's suicide her mother took the children to live in Marburg in 1896 and then to Munich in 1897. As a teenager, around the turn of the century Ina Seidel became involved with the exuberant arts scene focused on Munich's Schwabing quarter.

Ina Seidel's brother, Willy Seidel, also became a writer. Annemarie Seidel, her younger sister, became an actress and married a Dutchman. Her uncle, Heinrich Seidel, was an engineer and a poet-novelist.

=== Marriage and family ===
In 1907, Ina Seidel married her cousin, the evangelical minister and author Heinrich Wolfgang Seidel. The couple moved to Berlin where Heinrich had been assigned a parish. The next year, following the birth of her first child, Heilwig, she became ill with childbed fever, and the very slow rate of her recovery meant that she was stuck at home for much of the time; she never fully recovered. Writing became a prominent part of her life. She wrote poems and linked up with the aristocratic literati around Börries von Münchhausen and the Göttinger Musenalmanach set, which included Lulu von Strauß und Torney, and Agnes Miegel.

The couple moved with their child to Eberswalde in 1914. Ina's son, Georg Seidel, was born in 1919. He later built a career as a reporter, critic and essayist using the pseudonyms "Christian Ferber" and "Simon Glas".

=== War years ===
Like many of her social background in Germany and England, Ina Seidel's initial reaction to the outbreak of war in July 1914 was to welcome it. Between 1914 and 1933 Ina Seidel published five volumes of lyric poetry. Her volume of war poetry, Neben der Trommel ("Beside the drum") followed in 1915. Das Haus zum Monde ("The House on the Moon"), her first novel, appeared in 1916.

=== German republic period ===
Further works appeared during the republican years. Favorite themes included motherhood and the mysteries of race and heredity. In Das Labyrinth (1922) Seidel told the life story of Georg Forster. During this period, she also became involved with the women's rights movement. The family returned to Berlin in 1923 when accepted a post at the Neue Kirche, Berlin. Seidel's work during her second Berlin period reflected the wider literary trends of the 1920s, displaying a new willingness to experiment. In her historical novel Die Fürstin reitet (The Princess rides out, 1926) she intertwines known historical events with imagined scenes of her own devising in order to outline a narrative for the rise to power of Catherine the Great.

During the 1920s, she wrote her rural novel Brömseshof (1927) and also published essays and undertook work as an editor. Seidel's breakthrough novel was Das Wunschkind (1930), on which she had been working since 1914. The novel traces the experiences a mother during the Napoleonic Wars. Despite appearing during the final part of the Weimar period, sales of Das Wunschkind took off only after the Hitler government took power in 1933. In the view of at least one scholar, the book enjoyed official approval because of the extent to which it provides a "model for subsequent literary representations of motherhood that embraced Nazi ideology".

On 29 January 1932, Ina Seidel was admitted to membership of the Prussian Academy of Arts. She was only the second woman to receive this honour.

=== Hitler years ===
The National Socialists took power in January 1933. Seidel was one of many who demonstrated support for National Socialist ideology. In October 1933, she was one of 88 high-profile authors who signed the Vow of Total Loyalty ("Gelöbnis treuester Gefolgschaft") to Adolf Hitler. Seidel's public support for the Hitler government would remain steady till the regime's collapse. In 1934 she moved out of Berlin and settled in Starnberg, a Bavarian lakeside resort town. In 1938, her second major novel, "Lennacker", was published.

Seidel's poem "Lichtdom" appeared in 1941 in the volume Anthologie dem Führer (Anthology to the Leader). The final two lines of her tribute read, "Hier stehn wir alle einig um den Einen, und dieser Eine ist des Volkes Herz" (loosely, "Here we all stand united around the one [man], and that one man comes from the heart of the people"). The poem was one she had originally presented to Adolf Hitler two years earlier on the occasion of the leader's (widely celebrated) fiftieth birthday. In 1942, she teamed up with Hans Grosser to produce Dienende Herzen, Kriegsbriefe von Nachrichtenhelferinnen des Heeres, a series of biographical essays which glorified the women supporting the army through war work. Other war-time publications included biographical essays on the icons of German romanticism, Clemens Brentano and Achim von Arnim, which appeared in 1944.

During the closing phase of the war Seidel was one of 1041 artists listed on the 36-page so-called List of those Gifted by God ("Gottbegnadeten list"). The list was compiled by Joseph Goebbels and Hitler; it featured those whose artistic contributions the National Socialists valued most highly.

=== After the war ===
Postwar, Seidel immediately resigned her membership of the Prussian Academy of Arts. She faced strong criticism because of her record of strong public support for the Hitler government. However, within the American, British and French occupation zones her books soon returned to favor with the reading public, well into the 1960s. During the 1950s she produced two further novels with which she sought to rescue her reputation. In Das unverwesliche Erbe (1954; loosely, "The inalienable legacy") she expanded on the Christian aspects of her work. In her final novel, Michaela, she expressly accepted a share in the responsibility for National Socialism. In 1955 Ina Seidel was admitted to membership of the western Academy of Arts in West Berlin. In 1964, she was nominated for the Nobel Prize in Literature by German philologist Günther Jachmann. Long before she died, in 1974, her principal works had been translated into a number of foreign languages. A less than flattering obituary in Die Zeit nevertheless described the report of her demise as one of those to which one's first reaction is surprise that the deceased had not already died many years earlier ("Ja, hat sie noch gelebt?").

== Honours and memberships (selection) ==
- 1932: Full membership of the Prussian Academy of Arts (Berlin)
- 1932: Goethe Medal for the arts, sciences and humanities
- 1937: A secondary school in Berlin-Spandau (which later returned to its earlier name as the Lily-Braun-Gymnasium) was named after her between 1938 and 1945
- 1941: Franz Grillparzer Prize from the City of Vienna
- 1948: Full membership of the Bavarian Fine Arts Academy
- 1949: Wilhelm Raabe Prize from the City of Braunschweig
- 1954: Order of Merit (Steckkreuz) of the German Federal Republic
- 1955: Full membership of the Academy of Arts, Berlin (west)
- 1958: Great Arts Prize from he State of North Rhine Westfalia
- 1964: Bavarian order of merit
- 1966: Order of Merit of the Federal Republic of Germany (Order of Merit) of the German Federal Republic
- 1970: Honorary citizenship of Starnberg
