= Aufruf der Kulturschaffenden =

The Aufruf der Kulturschaffenden (translated from German into English as "call to the artists", or more literally "call to the cultural workers" or "call to the cultural sector") was a declaration by German artists of their loyalty to Adolf Hitler. The Aufruf was printed in the Völkischer Beobachter, the Nazi party newspaper, on 18 August 1934, the day before a plebiscite to confirm the merger of the offices of President (the head of state), and Chancellor (the head of government), in the person of Adolf Hitler.

Hitler was appointed as Chancellor of Germany following a general election in January 1933. After the Reichstag fire on 27 February 1933, and elections that returned Hitler to power on 5 March, Hitler moved rapidly to consolidate his power with the passing of the Enabling Act on 23 March 1933, which allowed Hitler bypass the German legislature and pass laws at will. After the death of President Paul von Hindenburg on 2 August, a referendum was passed on 19 August, with 88.1% voting to confirm the merger of the post of President with that of Chancellor, and Hitler became Führer und Reichskanzler.

The declaration states confidence in the leadership of Adolf Hitler, faith in and loyalty to him, and hope for the future. The statement followed similar public statements by others such as writers and poets (the Gelöbnis treuester Gefolgschaft in October 1933) and university professors (the Bekenntnis der deutschen Professoren zu Adolf Hitler, in November 1933).

Among the 37 artists to sign the Aufruf were:

- Ernst Barlach (1870–1938), sculptor, writer and artist
- Werner Beumelburg (1899–1963), writer, de:Werner Beumelburg
- Rudolf G. Binding (1867–1938), writer
- Hans Friedrich Blunck (1888–1961), writer
- Hugo Bruckmann (1863–1941), publisher
- Richard Euringer (1891-1953), writer
- Emil Fahrenkamp (1885–1966), architect
- Erich Feyerabend (1889-1945), painter
- Gustav Frenssen (1863–1945), novelist
- Wilhelm Furtwängler (1886–1954), conductor and composer
- Eberhard Hanfstaengl (1886–1973), art historian, de:Eberhard Hanfstaengl
- Gustav Havemann (1882–1960), violinist
- Erich Heckel (1883–1970), painter and graphic artist
- Eugen Hönig (1873–1945), architect
- Heinz Ihlert (1893–1945), culture politician, de:Heinz Ihlert
- Hanns Johst (1890–1978), writer
- Georg Kolbe (1877–1947), sculptor
- Erwin Guido Kolbenheyer (1878–1962), writer
- Werner Krauß (1884–1959) stage and film actor
- Franz Lenk (1898–1969), painter, de:Franz Lenk
- Heinrich Lersch (1889–1936), poet, de:Heinrich Lersch
- Carl Christoph Lörcher (1884-1966), architect, de:Carl Christoph Lörcher
- Walter March (1898–1969), architect
- Agnes Miegel (1879–1964), writer, journalist and poet
- Ludwig Mies van der Rohe (1886–1969), architect
- Börries von Münchhausen (1874-1945), writer
- Emil Nolde (1867–1956), painter
- Hans Pfitzner (1869–1949), composer
- Paul Pfund (1895-19..), painter, de:Paul Pfund
- Wilhelm Pinder (1878–1947), art historian, de:Wilhelm Pinder
- Paul Schultze-Naumburg (1869-1949), architect, writer and painter
- Hermann Stehr (1864-1940), dramatist and novelist
- Richard Strauss (1864–1949), composer
- Josef Thorak (1889–1952), sculptor
- Heinz Tietjen (1881-1967), conductor and music producer
- Johannes Weidemann (1897-1954) , mayor and politician, de:Johannes Weidemann
- Adolf Weinmüller (1886-1958), art dealer,

Some works of several of the artists to sign the Aufruf were later condemned as degenerate art.
