= Lulu von Strauss und Torney =

German writer and poet (1873–1956)

- Born: Lulu von Strauss und Torney; 1873 Bückeburg, German Empire
- Died: 1956 (aged 82–83) Germany
- Occupation: Poet; Novelist; Playwright; Translator
- Genre: Ballads; historical fiction
- Years active: c. 1898–1944
- Notable works: Balladen und Lieder (1902); Judas (1911); Der jüngste Tag (1922); Der Judenhof (1937)
- Notable awards: Goethe Medal for Art and Science
- Spouse: Eugen Diederichs (m. 1916)

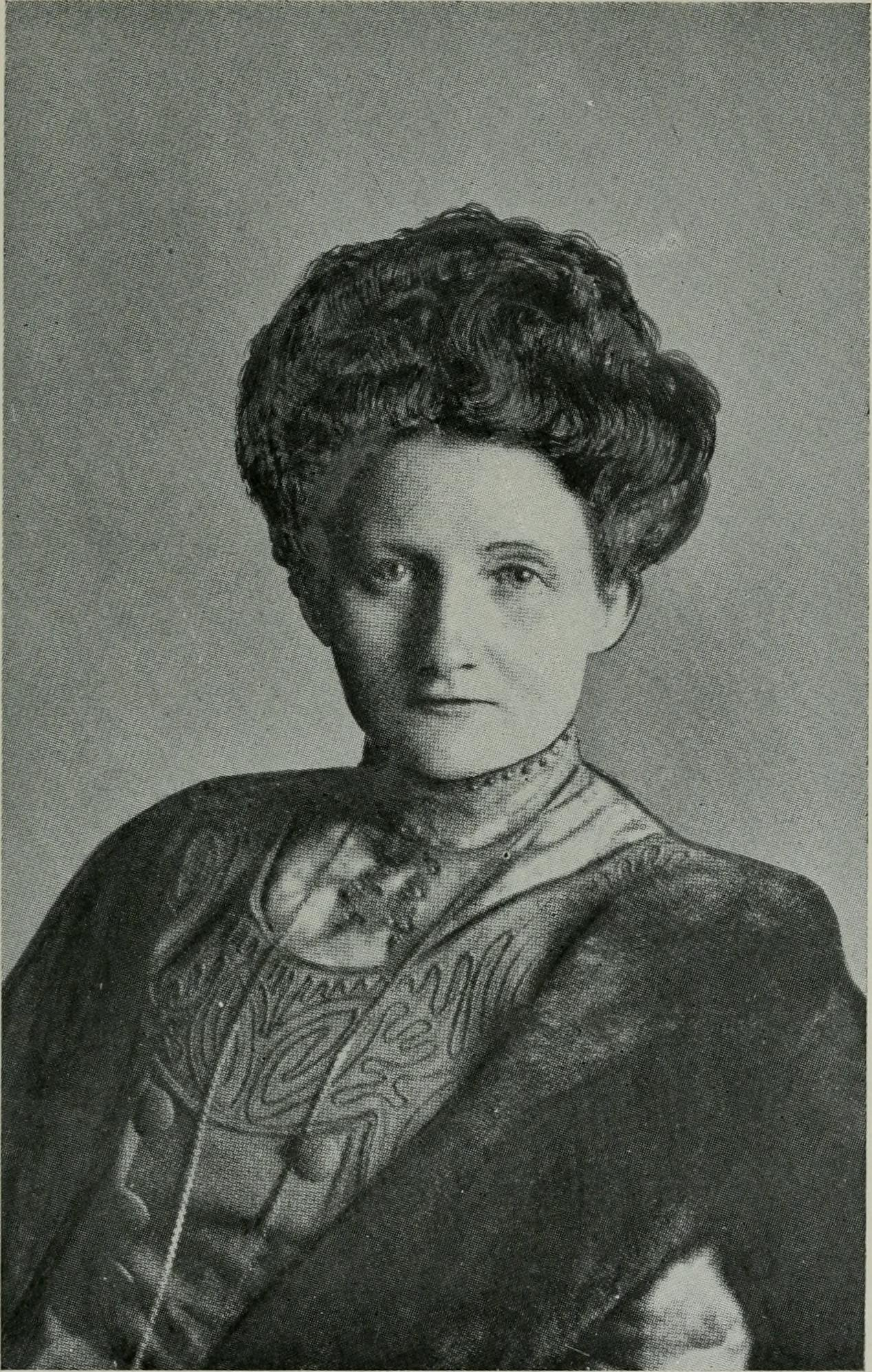

Lulu von Strauss und Torney (1873–1956) was a German poet and writer, best known for her ballads and rural historical fiction set in northwest Germany.

Lulu von Strauss und Torney (1873–1956) was a German poet and writer. Best remembered for her ballads, she also wrote historical fiction with rural settings in northwest Germany.

== Life ==
Lulu von Strauss und Torney was born in 1873 in Bückeburg. She was the daughter of a German general, who had served as an adjutant at the court of the Prince of Schaumburg-Lippe. She studied in Bückeburg.

In her twenties she began to write poetry and ballads, contributing to the ballad's early-20th-century revival as a genre. Encouraged by Börries von Münchhausen, she wrote from 1901 to 1905 for Münchhausen's literary magazine Göttinger Musenalmanach. Her 1911 novel Judas was later reworked as the 1937 Der Judenhof.

In 1916 she married the publisher Eugen Diederichs, settling with him in Jena. Another collection of ballads appeared in 1919. In 1921 she wrote the play Der Tempel. Her 1922 novel Der jüngste Tag treated the Münster rebellion by Anabaptists. Her politics moved to the right, and she proclaimed Hans Grimm's 1926 novel Volk ohne Raum to be "a German spiritual event".

After the Nazi seizure of power, she was an active supporter of Adolf Hitler and helped write Die Botschaft Gottes (The Message of God), a Nazi version of the New Testament. She was one of only five women that Hitler awarded with a Goethe Medal for Art and Science.

She published a biography of her husband after his death, and her own memoirs in 1943. Correspondence with Agnes Miegel and with Theodor Heuss was posthumously published. She also translated from the French.

== Works ==
- Gedichte, 1898.
- Balladen und Lieder, 1902.
- Bauernstolz. Wiesbaden: Verlag des Volksbildungsvereins zu Wiesbaden, 1905.
- Lucifer: Roman. Berlin: E. Fleischel, 1907.
- Neue Balladen und Lieder. Berlin: E. Fleischel, 1905.
- Judas: Roman. Berlin: Fleischel, 1911.
- Aus der Chronik niederdeutscher Städte. Stuttgart: Franckh, 1912.
- Reif steht die Staat: Neue Balladen. Jena: Diederichs, 1919.
- Der Tempel. Ein Spiel aus der Renaissance, 1921.
- Der jüngste Tag: Roman. Jena: E. Diederichs, 1922.
- Das Leben der heiligen Elisabeth. Jena: Diederichs, 1926.
- Deutsches Frauenleben in der Zeit der Sachsenkaiser und Hohenstaufen. Jena: Diederichs, 1927.
- Auge um Auge. Jena: Diederichs, 1933.
- Vom Biedermeier zur Bismarckzeit: aus dem Leben eines Neunzigjährigen. Jena: Diederichs, 1933.
- Eugen Diederichs Leben und Werk: ausgewählte Briefe und Aufzeichnungen. Jena: Eugen Diederichs Verlags, 1936.
- Erde der Väter : ausgewählte Gedichte. Jena: E. Diederichs, 1936.
- Der Judenhof, 1937.
- Das Kind am Fenster Erzählung. Jena: Diederichs, 1938.
- Das verborgene Angesicht: Erinnerungen. Jena: Eugen Diederichs, 1943.
- Das Meerminneke. Jena: E. Diederichs, 1944.
- Theodor Heuss-Lulu von Strauus und Torney; ein Briefwechsel. Düsseldorf: E. Diederichs, 1965.
- Tulipan. Balladen und Erzählungen. Düsseldorf: Diederichs, 1966.
- Als wir uns fanden, Schwester, wie waren wir jung Agnes Miegel an Lulu von Strauß und Torney; Briefe 1901 bis 1922. Augsburg: Maro-Verl, 2009.
