= Seniha Bedri Göknil =

- Born: 1901; Istanbul
- Died: June 4, 1973 (aged 72); Istanbul
- Resting place: Büyükada
- Years active: 1920-1973
- Children: 2
- Honours: Goethe-Medaille für Kunst und Wissenschaft

Seniha Bedri Göknil (1901, İstanbul - 4 June 1973, İstanbul), Turkish writer and translator.

She was born in 1901 to a well-known and religious aristocratic family in Istanbul. Her father was Mr. Ziya from Crete, Minister of Public Works and Advisor to the Prime Minister, and his mother was Mrs. Dilistan. After successfully graduating from Dame de Sion, one of the most important schools of the period, she started translating with her interest in literature thanks to the foreign language education she received at school. She first learned French through private education, and then German in the 1930s to the extent that he was able to make qualified translations. She has traveled abroad many times. She received the Goethe-Medaille für Kunst und Wissenschaft in 1933 for his work and success in translating Goethe's play Stella. This medal was previously awarded to Muhsin Ertuğrul in 1932. He is one of the two Turkish citizens who received this medal.

== Death ==
Göknil died on June 4, 1973. On June 6, 1973, after the funeral prayer at Teşvikiye, he was buried in the family cemetery in Büyükada.

== Works ==
- Faust (Goethe, 1935)
- King Lir (Shakespeare 1937, 3rd edition 1967)
- Selected Plays from World Literature (1938)
- Don Carlos (Schiller, 1943)
- Brand (Ibsen, 1945)
- Stella (Goethe, 1946)
- Wallastein's Trilogy I. Wallanstein's Headquarters (Schiller, 1946)
- II. The Piccolomini (Schiller, 1947)
- Wilhelm Tell (Schiller,1949)
- Honor (Suderman, 1950)
- Wallanstein's death (Schiller, 1952)
- A Trip to Italy (Goethe, 1953)
- Journalists (Freytag, 1956)
- Peer Gynt (Ibsen, 1956)
- Bandits (Schiller, 1958)
- Woe to the Liar (Grillparzer, 1958)
- As the Sun Sets (Hauptmann, 1959)
- Mara (Weis, 1968)
