= Goethe-Medaille für Kunst und Wissenschaft =

Goethe-Medaille für Kunst und Wissenschaft

The Goethe-Medaille für Kunst und Wissenschaft (Goethe Medal for Art and Science) is a German award. It was authorized by Reichspräsident Paul von Hindenburg to commemorate the centenary of Johann Wolfgang von Goethe's death on March 22, 1932. It consists of a silver, non-wearable medal (62mm, after about 1938 69.5mm in diameter).

This medal should not be confused with the Goldene Goethe-Medaille (Goethe Medal in Gold) of the Weimar Goethe Society (61 awards from 1910 to 2017), the "Goethepreis der Stadt Frankfurt" (Goethe Prize of the City of Frankfurt) which since 1927 has been awarded first annually, then triennially (45 awards from 1927 to 2017 – no medal), the "Goethe-Plakette der Stadt Frankfurt" (Goethe Plaque of the City of Frankfurt) 158 awards from 1947 to 2017, or the "Goethe-Medaille" (Goethe Medal) of the Goethe-Institut, which from 1955 to 2017 has been awarded to 345 personalities from 57 countries. With more than 600 recipients, the "Goethe-Medaille für Kunst und Wissenschaft" is thus the most widely distributed award named after Goethe.

== Under Hindenburg – 1932–1934 ==
Originally meant to honor persons who had performed some service in connection with the 1932 Goethe Centennial at Weimar, the "Goethe-Medaille für Kunst und Wissenschaft" was since April 1932 in Hindenburg's name given to Goethe scholars, artists, scientists, government officials and politicians. Between March 18, 1932, and June 19, 1934, almost 200 persons were honored, 159 of these before January 30, 1933. Among the first 55 recipients of the Medal were Chancellor Brüning, and the Nobel Prize winners Gerhart Hauptmann and Thomas Mann. Starting in April 1932 there followed Max Planck and the current or future Nobel Prize bearers Nicholas Murray Butler, André Gide, Knut Hamsun, Verner von Heidenstam, Guglielmo Marconi, Albert Schweitzer, Fritz Haber and Richard Willstätter. Other recipients were Benito Mussolini, José Ortega y Gasset, Wilhelm Furtwängler, Otto Klemperer, Carl Goerdeler, Paul Ernst, Hans Grimm and E. G. Kolbenheyer. About one quarter of the honorees of the Goethe Medal before July 1934 were non-Germans. Women were rarely considered; only Ricarda Huch, Agnes Miegel, Ina Seidel, Feodora, Grand Duchess of Saxon-Weimar, Enrica von Handel-Mazzetti and the Turkish writer Seniha Bedri were apparently thought to be worthy of the Medal. In Hindenburg's name this medal was last awarded under the date of June 19, 1934.

== Under Hitler – 1934–1944 ==
Beginning in November 1934, Adolf Hitler, in his position as German Head of State, took over the awarding of the "Goethe-Medaille für Kunst und Wissenschaft". Among them are the Nobel Prize winners Hans von Euler-Chelpin, Johannes Stark, Heinrich Wieland and Adolf Windaus, as well as five women: Anna Bahr-Mildenburg, Hedwig Bleibtreu, Agnes Bluhm, Isolde Kurz, and Lulu von Strauß und Torney. Under Hitler the Medal was generally awarded only on high birthdays or other important anniversaries. Many of the recipients were followers of National Socialism. Jewish candidates were no longer considered (until January 1933 at least eleven Germans of Jewish origin had been honored by Hindenburg with the Medal, although Albert Einstein and Sigmund Freud were ignored). The last "Goethe-Medaille für Kunst und Wissenschaft" was awarded on December 10, 1944.

== Sources ==
- Heyck, Hartmut (2009). Goethe - Hindenburg - Hitler: die Entstehungs- und Verleihungsgeschichte der Goethe-Medaille für Kunst und Wissenschaft (1932-1944) mit den Namen von 600 Empfängern (in German). Ottawa, Canada: Heyck Publ. ISBN 978-0-9812182-1-2.
- Klietmann, Kurt-Gerhard (1990). Staatlich-zivile Auszeichnungen: Weimarer Republik und Drittes Reich (in German). Stuttgart: Motorbuch-Verl. ISBN 978-3-613-01300-1. search under "Goethe-Medaille für Kunst und Wissenschaft"
