= Georg Wille =

German cellist (1869–1958)

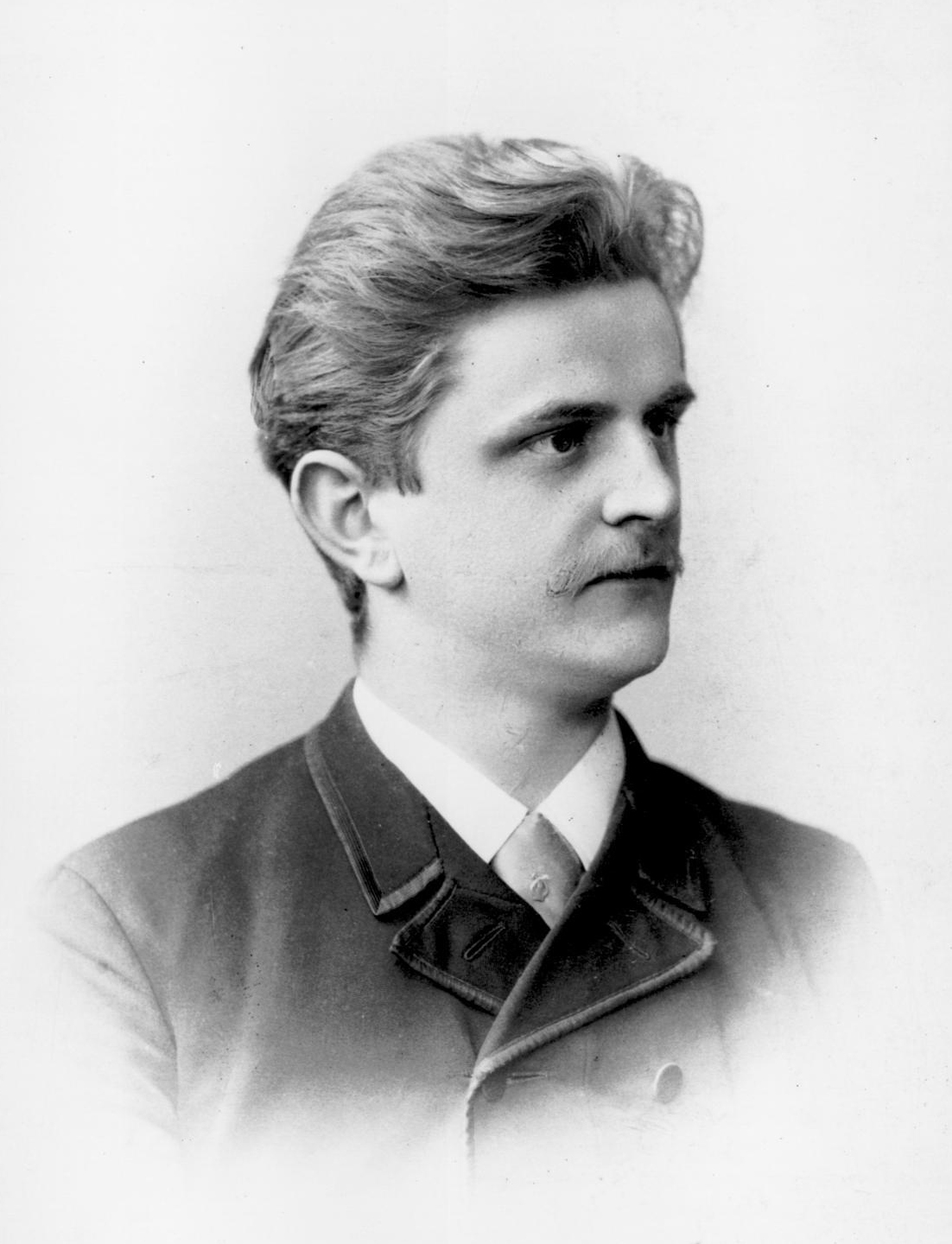
Georg Wille (before 1899)

Georg Wille (20 September 1869 – 9 November 1958) was a German cellist.

== Life ==
Wille was born in 1869 as the son of the music director Gustav Wille in the royal residence of the Principality of Reuss-Greiz. After receiving his first music lessons from his father, he became a violoncello pupil from 1885 to 1890 with Julius Klengel, solo cellist of the Gewandhaus and professor at the University of Music and Theatre Leipzig. There, he also received the Schumann Prize. He was trained in theory and composition by the Bach researcher Wilhelm Rust.

From 1889 until 1899, Wille was a member of the Gewandhausorchester. He started as an aspirant of the city orchestra, became a member of the orchestra pension fund or deputy principal cellist in 1891 and was promoted to principal cellist in 1891, succeeding Carl Schroeder. From 1891 to 1899, he was also a member of the Gewandhaus Quartet. In Leipzig, he also belonged to the Freemason Lodge "Minerva zu den drei Palmen".

In 1899, Wille moved to the Staatskapelle Dresden, where he was principal cellist until 1925. In 1902, he became court concertmaster and in 1908, royal professor at the Hochschule für Musik Carl Maria von Weber Dresden. He was one of the initiators of the Dresden orchestral school, which he directed from 1925. He also directed the local school orchestra and in 1927 established a foundation for the promotion of the orchestra. Until 1944 he was the only honorary member of the Dresdner Kapelle. From 1889 to 1914, he was a member of the Dresden Petri Quartet. After the death of Henri Petri, the string quartet, while still active, was renamed Dresdner Streichquartett der Königlichen Kapelle and was taken over by Gustav Havemann (from 1923 Max Strub) as Primarius.

As a musician he performed among others with Johannes Brahms and Artur Rubinstein. In 1926, the director of the music school Bruno Hinze-Reinhold tried to get Wille to teach at the Hochschule für Musik Franz Liszt, Weimar, but failed due to the low salary.

He published Tonleiter-Studien for violoncello in the Hamburg publishing house of Daniel Rahter.

His brothers, Alfred Wille (1868-1950), and Paul Wille (1873-1929), were also orchestral musicians.

Georg Wille died in Dresden at the age of 89.

== Awards ==
In 1901, he was awarded the Order of Merit for Science and Art. He also received the Order of Albert the Bear. On the occasion of his 80th birthday in 1949, he became Honorary citizen of the city of Greiz.
