= Gustav Havemann =

German violinist

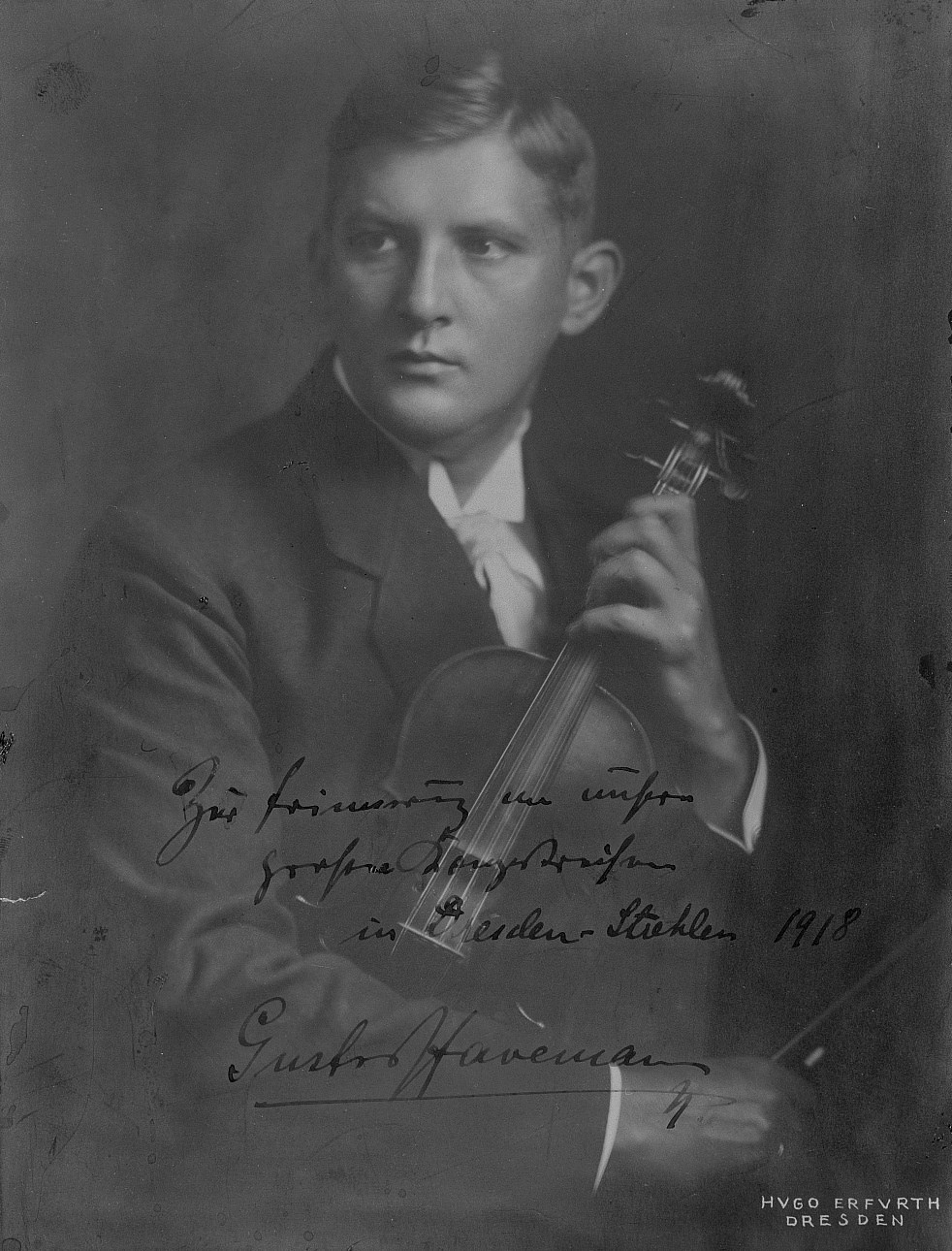
Gustav Havemann (c. 1915). Photo by Hugo Erfurth

Gustav Havemann (15 March 1882 – 2 January 1960) was a German violinist and from 1933 to 1935 head of the "Reichsmusikerschaft" in the Reichsmusikkammer.

== Life ==
Born in Güstrow, Havemann first learned to play the violin from his father, the military musician Johann Havemann. Even before he attended school, he performed in a concert. After the death of his father, he was further educated by the husband of his sister Frieda, music director Ernst Parlow, the son of Albert Parlow, as well as Bruno Ahner, and played in the court orchestra in Schwerin before he went to the Universität der Künste Berlin in 1898, where one of his important teachers was Joseph Joachim.

From 1900 he was concertmaster in Lübeck, in 1905 court concertmaster in Darmstadt and Hamburg, in 1911 he became teacher at the Leipzig Conservatory and was concertmaster at the Dresden court opera from 1915 to 1921. After the death of Henri Petri he became primarius of the Dresden String Quartet of the Royal Chapel (former Petri Quartet). In 1914, his son Wolfgang was born, who was later active in the anti-fascist resistance organization Rote Kapelle. In 1916 he was awarded the Order for Art and Science by the Grand Duchy of Mecklenburg-Strelitz. From 1921 to 1945 he held a professorship at the Berlin Hochschule, and from 1951 to 1959 he taught at the German Hochschule für Musik in Berlin (GDR).

In the early 1920s he founded the Havemann String Quartet with Georg Kühnau [this name is repeated in many places, but a program of the quartet from May 2, 1922, gives the name of Georg Kniestädt as the second violin and another source states Georg Kniestädt was the second violin to 1926], Hans Mahlke and Adolf Steiner and gave concerts internationally. The repertoire ranged from classical to modern, including pieces by Alban Berg (premiere (?) String Quartet op. 3 on 2 August 1923) or Alois Hába. After Georg Kühnau left the quartet in 1931, the now so-called Havemann Trio played Adolf Brunner's String Trio in Coburg on June 7 of the same year. In 1925 Havemann was a member of the artist association Novembergruppe.

Violinist Bertha Havemann, (née Fuchs; 1892-1931) became Havemann's pupil in Darmstadt at a young age and his second wife in 1913 in Keitum on Sylt. Four children were born in this marriage by 1921. Bertha Fuchs was the daughter of Theodor Fuchs, later mayor of Jena.

In 1931, Havemann married his 3rd wife, Ingeborg Harnack, the sister of the later Resistance fighter, who was recently divorced from the artist Johannes Ilmari Auerbach Arvid and Falk Harnack. Havemann was a member of the Völkisch movement, anti-Semitic Kampfbund für deutsche Kultur. In 1932, he joined the NSDAP under the number 1.179.504). With his brother-in-law Arvid Harnack, there were frequent disputes over Havemann's "conviction of Hitler's mission". From 1932 to 1935 Havemann directed the Berlin Kampfbund Orchestra, which he founded and which was renamed the "Landesorchester des Gaues Berlin" in 1934.

After the Nazi seizure of power he wrote to the Deutscher Konzertgeberbund on 2 April 1933: "The Kampfbund für deutsche Kultur will know how to prevent Jewish influence from remaining in Germany's musical life". In addition, he worked intensively on the Gleichschaltung of German musical life, especially since he had become a member of the Presidential Council of the Reichsmusikkammer in November 1933.

After the death of the Reich President Paul von Hindenburg, he was one of the signatories of the Call of the Cultural Creators in August 1934 to the 1934 German referendum on the merger of the offices of the Reich President and the Reich Chancellor. He was also listed in Das Deutsche Führerlexikon, an official handbook of NS celebrities from 1934. According to an entry in Joseph Goebbels' diary of 5 July 1935, however, on the day he dismissed Havemann: Havemann dismissed for making a statement for Hindemith. and then entered in the List of Music Bolshevists of the Nazi Cultural Community.

Another account of the incidents states that Havemann was by no means deposed by Goebbels. After Havemann had stood up not only for Hindemith, but also for musicians of Jewish origin, who, much to his annoyance, had been removed from his orchestra and replaced by party-conform, second-rate musicians, he is said to have thrown his office at Goebbels' feet in 1935 in a rage. Since this was not allowed to become public, the Minister of Propaganda had a version published in the newspapers the following day, stating that Havemann had been dismissed from his office on the grounds of incompetence.

According to yet another version, Gustav Havemann left the Reichsmusikkammer in February 1936 with the official explanation that this was "in no way defamatory, but purely factual". The comment had become necessary because Havemann had been accused of alcoholism. His commitment to Hindemith had previously also been the downfall of Wilhelm Furtwängler.

From 1942, Havemann wrote various articles for the NS journal Das Reich controlled by Goebbels.

The Universität der Künste Berlin, the successor entity to the Hochschule für Musik, reported the wartime loss of a 1719 Stradivarius violin, which is said to have been bequeathed to the school on 27 March 1943 by Dr Maria Alois Lautenschlager. During World War II, Gustav Havemann, then living near Berlin, took custody of the violin for safekeeping. But he found himself in the Russian zone at the end of the war, and turned the Stradivari over to two Russian officers.

From 1950, he taught at the Musikfachschule Cottbus, since 1951 at the Musikhochschule Hanns Eisler in East Berlin. He died in January 1960 in Schöneiche, near Berlin, aged 77.

== Work ==
Havemann wrote a violin concerto, op. 3 (1939) and published several didactic works for violin:

- Was ein Geiger wissen muss. (1921)
- Die Violintechnik bis zur Vollendung. (1928)
