= Gelöbnis treuester Gefolgschaft =

1933 declaration of allegiance to Hitler

The Gelöbnis treuester Gefolgschaft (variously translated from German to English as "vow of most faithful allegiance", "proclamation of loyalty of German writers" or "promise of most loyal obedience") was a declaration by 88 German writers and poets of their loyalty to Adolf Hitler. It was printed in the Vossische Zeitung on 26 October 1933 and publicised by the Prussian Academy of Arts in Berlin. It was also published in other newspapers, such as the Frankfurter Zeitung, to widen public awareness of the confidence of the signed poets and writers in Hitler as the Chancellor of Germany.

== Background ==
The declaration came towards the end of 1933, in the period of domestic turmoil in Germany following the Reichstag fire on 27 February 1933, the elections that returned Hitler to power on 5 March, and the passing of the Enabling Act on 23 March 1933 which allowed Hitler bypass the German legislature and pass laws at will. It came shortly after the editor law (Schriftleitergesetz) was passed on 4 October 1933, which sought to bring the press under government control, and the withdrawal of Germany from the League of Nations on 21 October 1933.

The editor law regulated journalism, and requiring journalists to be registered on an official list of the Reichspressekammer, under Joseph Goebbels' Ministry of Public Enlightenment and Propaganda. To join the list, a journalist had to demonstrate one year's professional training, "political reliability", and Aryan descent. Newspaper editors were also regulated and subject to central control. Around 1,300 journalists lost their jobs when the editor law came into force on 1 January 1934.

German writer Hanns Martin Elster (1910–1998) complained on 28 October 1933 that writers not listed could be mistakenly thought to lack loyalty to the Führer. However, some writers felt forced to sign to protect themselves or their publishers.

The declaration by German writers was echoed by similar declarations by 900 university and high school professors, and by other artists.

- Commitment of the professors - Bekenntnis der Professoren an den deutschen Universitäten und Hochschulen zu Adolf Hitler - in November 1933
- Call to the artists - Aufruf der Kulturschaffenden in August 1934

== Text of the vow ==
Friede, Arbeit, Freiheit und Ehre sind die heiligsten Güter jeder Nation und die Voraussetzung eines aufrichtigen Zusammenlebens der Völker untereinander. Das Bewußtsein der Kraft und der wiedergewonnenen Einigkeit, unser aufrichtiger Wille, dem inneren und äußeren Frieden vorbehaltlos zu dienen, die tiefe Überzeugung von unseren Aufgaben zum Wiederaufbau des Reiches und unsre Entschlossenheit, nichts zu tun, was nicht mit unsrer und des Vaterlandes Ehre vereinbar ist, veranlassen uns, in dieser ernsten Stunde vor Ihnen, Herr Reichskanzler, das Gelöbnis treuester Gefolgschaft feierlichst abzulegen.	Peace, work, freedom and honour are the most sacred goods of each nation and a precondition for honest coexistence of peoples with each other. Consciousness of our power and recovered unity, our sincere will to serve unreservedly the cause of peace inside and outside our nation, the deep conviction of our tasks in the reconstruction of the Reich, and our determination to do to nothing that is not compatible with our honour and that of our Fatherland, make us, in this grave hour submit to you, Herr Reich Chancellor, this vow of our most faithful allegiance.

== Signatories ==
The 88 signatories were:

1. Friedrich Arenhövel (1886–1954)
2. Gottfried Benn (1886–1956)
3. Werner Beumelburg (1899–1963)
4. Rudolf G. Binding (1867–1938)
5. Walter Bloem (1868–1951)
6. Hans Friedrich Blunck (1888–1961)
7. Max Karl Böttcher (1881–1963)
8. Rolf Brandt (1886–1953)
9. Arnolt Bronnen (1895–1959)
10. Otto Brües (1897–1967)
11. Alfred Brust (1891–1934)
12. Carl Bulcke (1875–1936)
13. Hermann Claudius (1878–1980)
14. Hans Martin Cremer (1890–1953)
15. Marie Diers (1867–1949)
16. Peter Dörfler (1878–1955)
17. Max Dreyer (1862–1946)
18. Franz Dülberg (1873–1934)
19. Ferdinand Eckhardt (1902–1995)
20. Richard Euringer (1891–1953)
21. Ludwig Finckh (1876–1964)
22. Otto Flake (1880–1963)
23. Hans Franck (1879–1964)
24. Gustav Frenssen (1863–1945)
25. Heinrich von Gleichen (1882–1959)
26. Alexander von Gleichen-Rußwurm (1865–1947)
27. Friedrich Griese (1890–1975)
28. Max Grube (1854–1934)
29. Johannes von Guenther (1886–1973)
30. Carl Haensel (1889–1968)
31. Max Halbe (1865–1944)
32. Ilse Hamel (1874–1943)
33. Agnes Harder (1864–1939)
34. Karl Heinl (1898–1961)
35. Hans Ludwig Held (1885–1954)
36. Friedrich W. Herzog (1902–1976)
37. Rudolf Herzog (1869–1943)
38. Paul Oskar Höcker (1865–1944)
39. Rudolf Huch (1862–1943)
40. Hans von Hülsen (1890–1968)
41. Bruno Herbert Jahn (born 1893)
42. Hanns Johst (1890–1978)
43. Max Jungnickel (1890–1945)
44. Hans Knudsen (1886–1971)
45. Ruth Köhler-Irrgang (1900–1969)
46. Gustav Kohne (1879–1961)
47. Carl Lange (1885–1959)
48. Johannes von Leers (1902–1965)
49. Heinrich Lersch (1889–1936)
50. Heinrich Lilienfein (1879–1952)
51. Oskar Loerke (1884–1941)
52. Gerhard Menzel (1894–1966)
53. Herybert Menzel (1906–1945)
54. Alfred Richard Meyer, known as Munkepunke (1892–1956)
55. Agnes Miegel (1879–1964)
56. Walter von Molo (1880–1958)
57. Georg Mühlen-Schulte (1882–1981)
58. Fritz Müller-Partenkirchen (1875–1942)
59. Börries von Münchhausen (1874–1945)
60. Eckart von Naso (1888–1976)
61. Helene von Nostitz (1878–1944)
62. Josef Ponten (1883–1940)
63. Rudolf Presber (1868–1935)
64. Arthur Rehbein (1867–1952)
65. Ilse Reicke (1893–1989)
66. Johannes Richter (writer) (1889–1941)
67. Franz Schauwecker (1890–1964)
68. Johannes Schlaf (1862–1941)
69. Anton Schnack (1892–1973)
70. Friedrich Schnack (1888–1977)
71. Richard Schneider-Edenkoben (1899–1986?)
72. Wilhelm von Scholz (1874–1969)
73. Lothar Schreyer (1886–1966)
74. Gustav Schröer (1876–1949)
75. Wilhelm Schussen (1874–1956)
76. Ina Seidel (1885–1974)
77. Willy Seidel (1887–1934)
78. Heinrich Sohnrey (1859–1948)
79. Diedrich Speckmann (1874–1938)
80. Heinz Steguweit (1897–1964)
81. Lulu von Strauß und Torney (1873–1956)
82. Eduard Stucken (1865–1936)
83. Will Vesper (1882–1962)
84. Josef Magnus Wehner (1891–1973)
85. Leo Weismantel (1888–1964)
86. Bruno E. Werner (1896–1964)
87. Heinrich Zerkaulen (1892–1954)
88. Hans-Caspar von Zobeltitz (1883–1940)

== See also ==
- Racial policy of Nazi Germany
- Urgent Call for Unity
