= Tobias Stimmer =

Swiss painter and illustrator (1539–1584)

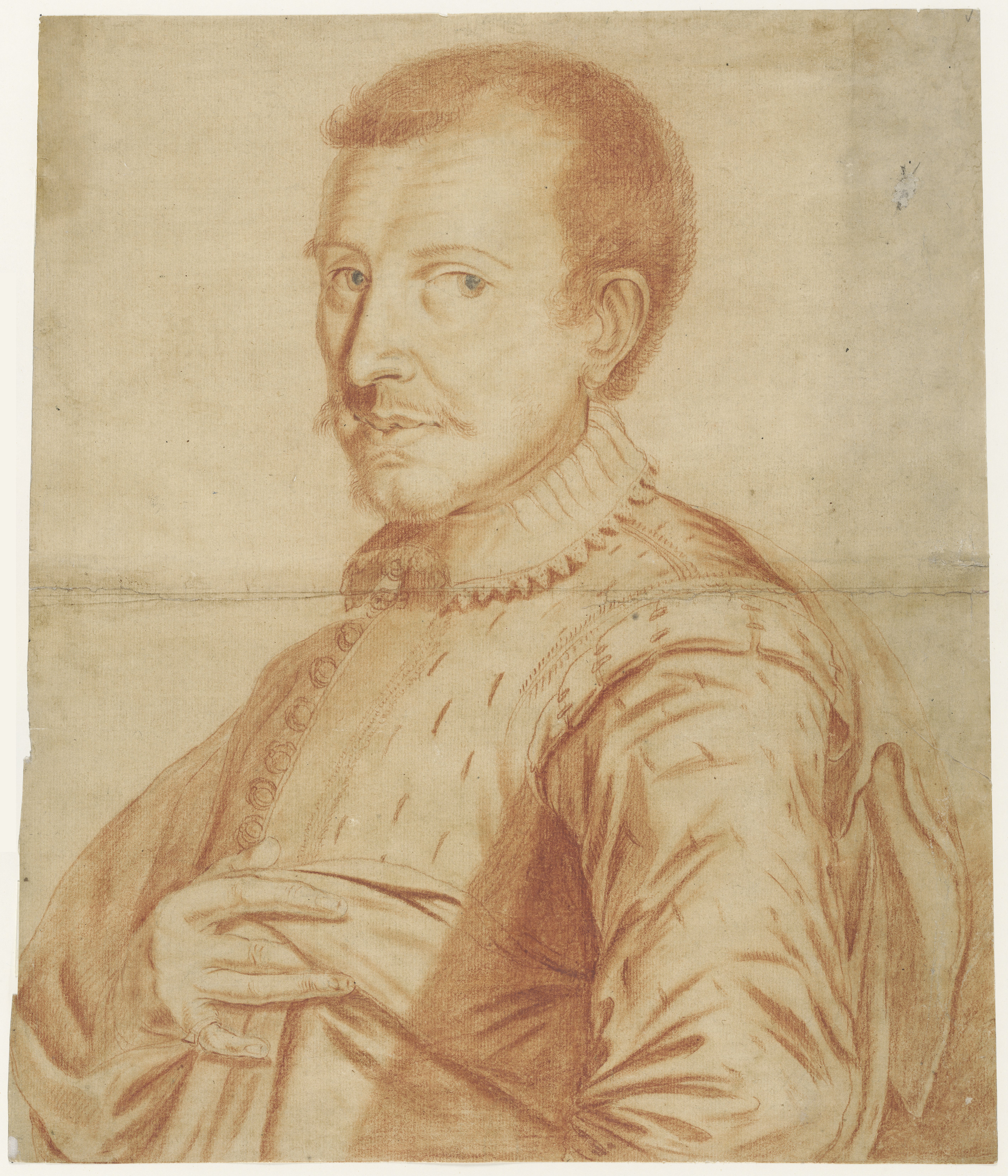
- Portrait of Stimmer by Conrad Meyer, c. 1660s
- Born: 7 April 1539; Schaffhausen, Old Swiss Confederacy
- Died: 4 January 1584 (aged 44); Strasbourg, Holy Roman Empire
- Known for: Portraits, Illustrations
- Notable work: Portrait of Jacob Schwytzer and his wife Elsbeth Lochmann
- Movement: Renaissance

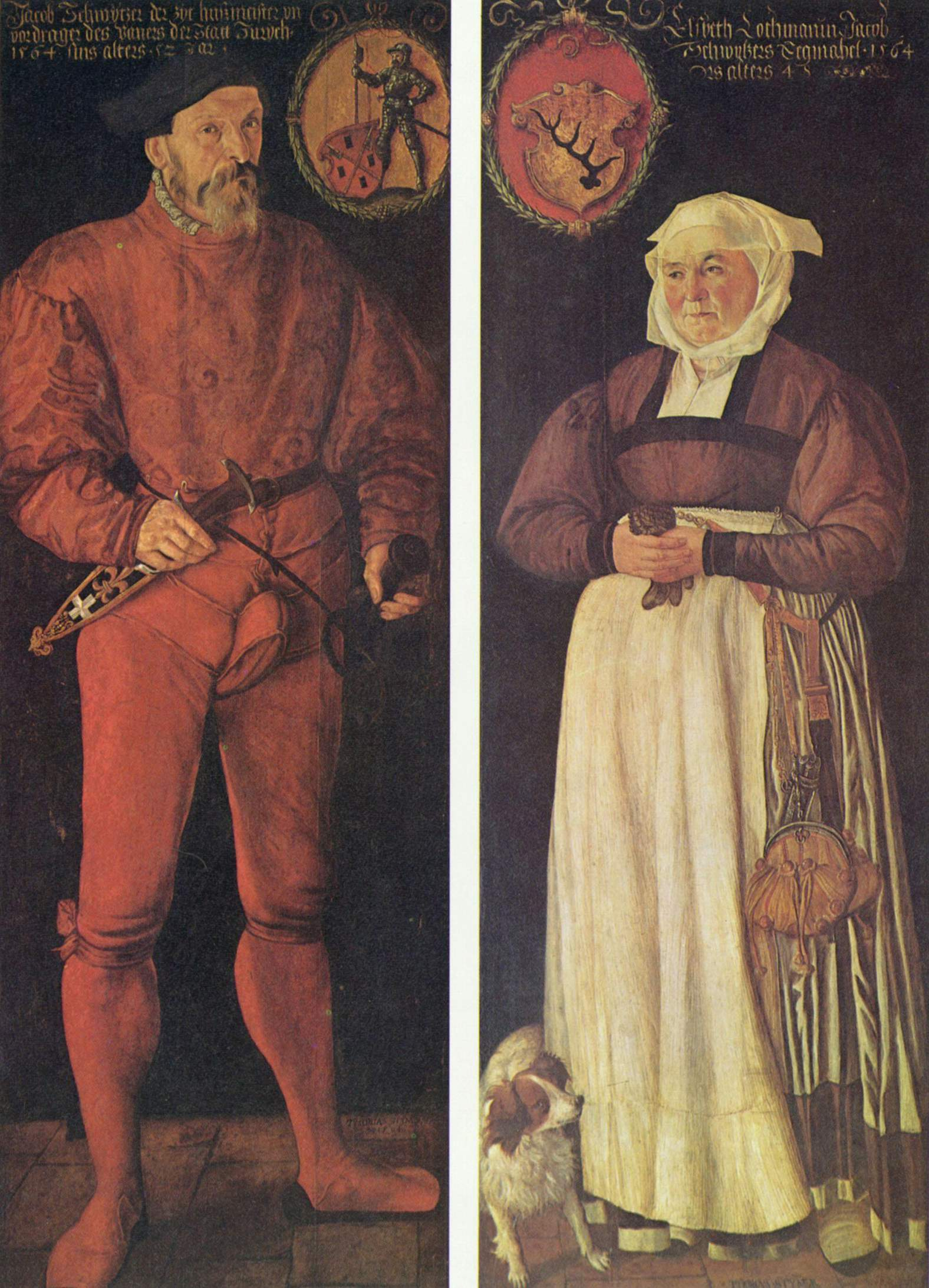
Portrait of Jacob Schwytzer and his wife Elsbeth Lochmann

Tobias Stimmer (7 April 1539 – 4 January 1584) was a Swiss painter and illustrator. His most famous work is the paintings on the Strasbourg astronomical clock.

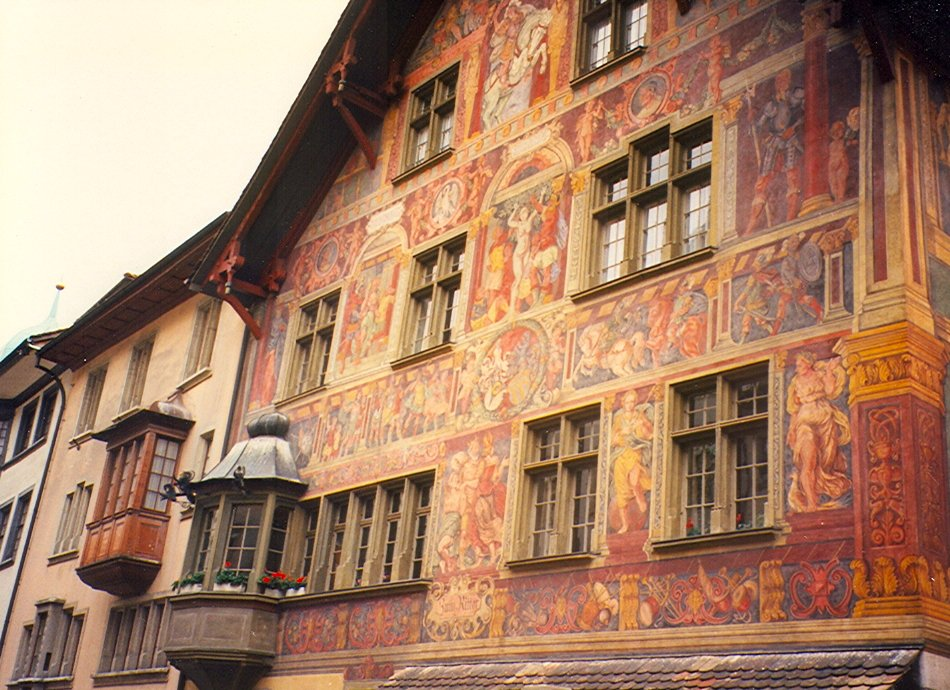
House zum Ritter

== Biography ==
He was born in Schaffhausen, and was active in Schaffhausen, Strasbourg and Baden-Baden as a wall and portrait painter. He made a great number of drawings for woodcuts (Bible scenes, allegories, etc.) which were published by the printer Sigmund Feyerabend in Frankfurt am Main, and Bernhart Jobin in Strasbourg.

Stimmer followed Hans Holbein the Younger, but developed his own mannerism. Among his wall paintings remain the "House zum Ritter" in Schaffhausen, although this was actually much restored and changed.
