= Ilse Reicke =

German writer, journalist and feminist

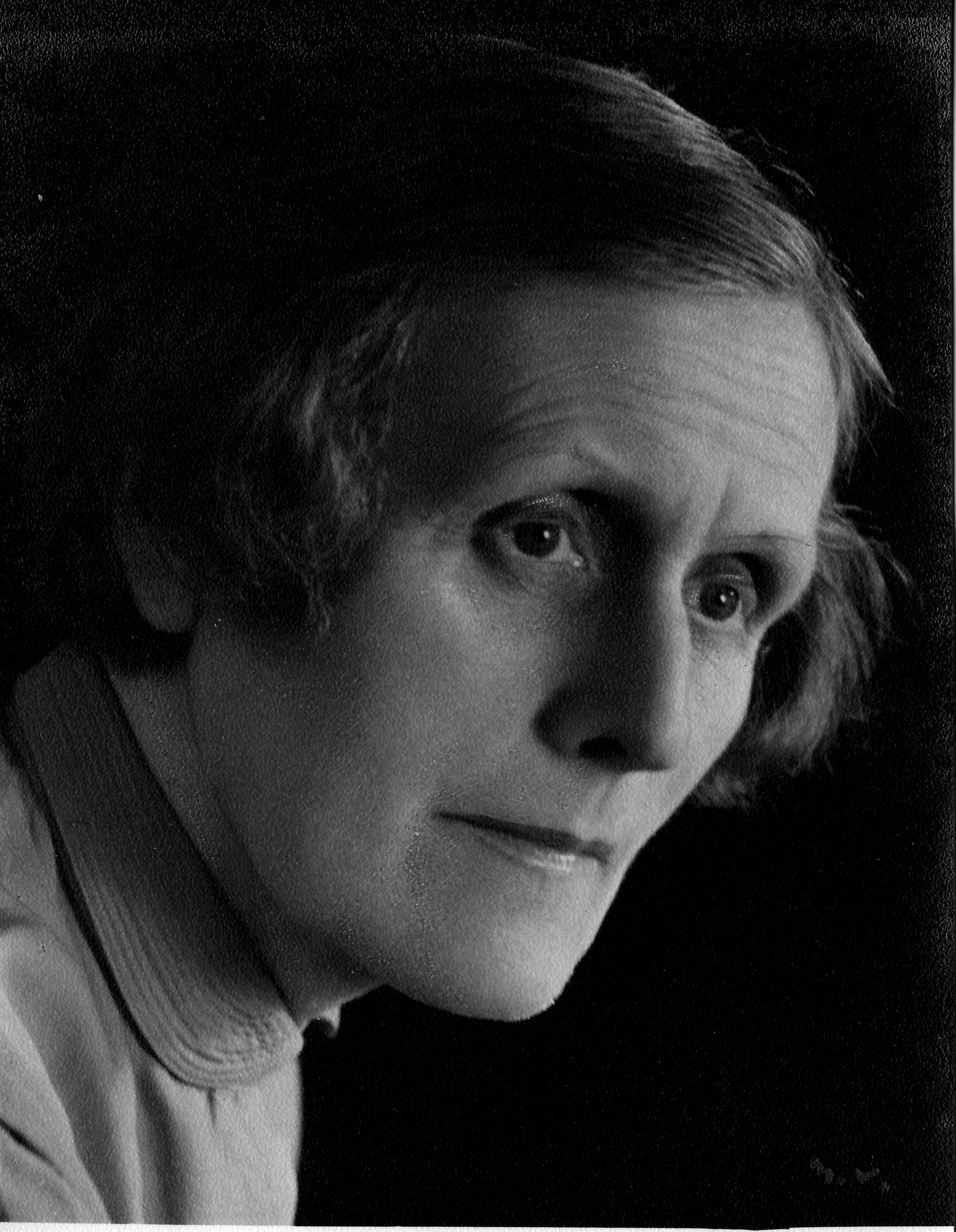
Ilse Reicke in 1950

Ilse Reicke (4 July 1893 – 14 January 1989) was a German writer, journalist and feminist.

== Biography ==
Ilse Reicke was born in the Friedenau quarter of Berlin. She came from a family of academics and lawyers. Georg Reicke (1863–1923), her father, was a Justiziar (senior court official) and a published poet, who had a subsequent career as a Berlin politician, serving for many years from 1903 as Berlin's deputy mayor.

She studied philosophy, history and Germanistics at Berlin, Heidelberg and Greifswald, concluding with a doctorate, received from Greifswald in 1915, in return for a dissertation on "poetry from a psychological perspective" ("Das Dichten in psychologischer Betrachtung"). By this time she had already published, in 1914, her first substantial work, a volume of poetry entitled "Das schmerzliche Wunder" ("The painful miracle"). 1915 was also the year in which she married the writer Hans von Hülsen (1890–1968). The marriage produced three recorded daughters, but ended in separation around 1930 and divorce in 1935.

After receiving her doctorate, till 1919 Reicke taught at the prestigious Lessing Academy in Berlin. She combined this with work as a war reporter, travelling to the Eastern Front and filing reports for various newspapers. It was also around this time that she started writing for Die Woche, the weekly news magazine: she continued as a contributor to it, frequently returning to the subject of marriage, till 1933. Between 1919 and 1921 She took charge of the "Neue Frauen-Zeitung" ("New Women's Newspaper"), produced in Berlin's Charlottenburg quarter, and believed to be Germany's first daily newspaper expressly for women. Later she became the publisher of "Mutter und Kinderland" and of the year books "Wir sind jung" ("We are young") and "Herzblättchens Zeitvertreib", work which after her divorce enabled her to run her house and support her three daughters.

Closely aligned with the more conservative wing of the feminist movement, Reicke developed a substantial repertoire of lectures on feminist topics, also publishing numerous novels and essays, which took as their central theme the position of the modern woman in society. She also became involved in the organisation feminist groups, for instance as deputy chair of the City Association of Berlin Women's Associations, and as a delegate to a succession of International Women's Congresses in Washington (1925), Paris (1926) and Berlin (1929). She knew personally all the important representatives of the German feminist movement during this period, and several decades later she celebrated a number of them in a volume of biographical "portraits", published in 1984 and, as matter turned out, her last published book.

The Nazi take-over in January 1933 ushered in a rapid transformation to twelve years of one-party dictatorship. In October 1933 Ilse Reicke and her estranged husband were two of the eighty-eight German writers who signed the widely publicised (and subsequently infamous) Vow of loyal obedience ("Gelöbnis treuester Gefolgschaft") to the leader. She was a member of the government's "Chamber of Writers" which was seen as an important prerequisite to pursuing a career as a published author, but later, as the inhuman and destructive impetus of Nazi government emerged, became deeply discrediting. She continued to write and to publish, although the rate at which her books appeared slowed down. She also supported Gertrud Bäumer (1873-1954) who continued to publish the monthly magazine "Die Frau" ("The Woman"). The magazine was the leading women's magazine of the time in Germany, and continued in to appear till 1944 through maintaining a politically uncritical attitude.

War ended in May 1945. Because she was seen to have achieved a measure of conditionally calibrated distance from Nazism she was welcomed as a guest at the postwar "Berlin Women's Association" ("Berliner Frauenbund") and later at the German Women's Council. In addition, her literary output continued to attract public interest.

During the postwar years, she relocated from Berlin to Fürth in Middle Franconia, where in 1989 she died. Her first postwar book, which appeared only in 1952, was a biographical study of the pacifist writer Bertha von Suttner. After this there were two further volumes of lyric verse, which appeared in 1968 and 1969.

== Partial bibliography ==
- 1984 Die großen Frauen der Weimarer Republik. Erlebnisse im „Berliner Frühling“
- 1981 Eine Sippe aus Memel.
- 1981 Die Musikantin Olga Schwind.
- 1952 Schlimmes Geheimnis der Klasse. Jugendkriminalroman
- 1952 Bertha von Suttner. Ein Lebensbild
- 1943 Das Brautschiff. Roman
- 1939 Durch gute Lebensart zum Erfolg.
- 1938 Die Welle steigt, die Welle sinkt. Roman
- 1938 Das tätige Herz. Ein Lebensbild Hedwig Heyls
- 1933 Das Schifflein Allfriede. Ein Jugendroman
- 1931 Berühmte Frauen der Weltgeschichte. Sechs Betrachtungen
- 1931 Der Weg der Irma Carus, Roman über eine Frauenärztin
- 1930 Leichtsinn, Lüge, Leidenschaft. Ein Schicksal aus dem russischen Rokoko
- 1929 Die Frauenbewegung. Ein geschichtlicher Überblick
- 1928 Fraueninteressen in der Tagespresse, in Emmy Wolff Hg.: Frauengenerationen in Bildern. Herbig, Berlin 1928, pp. 116 - 125
- 1924 Das junge Mädchen, Lebensgestaltungsbuch
- 1921 Frauenbewegung und Erziehung
- 1919 Der Weg nach Lohde, Roman
