= Petri Quartet =

Dutch String Quartet

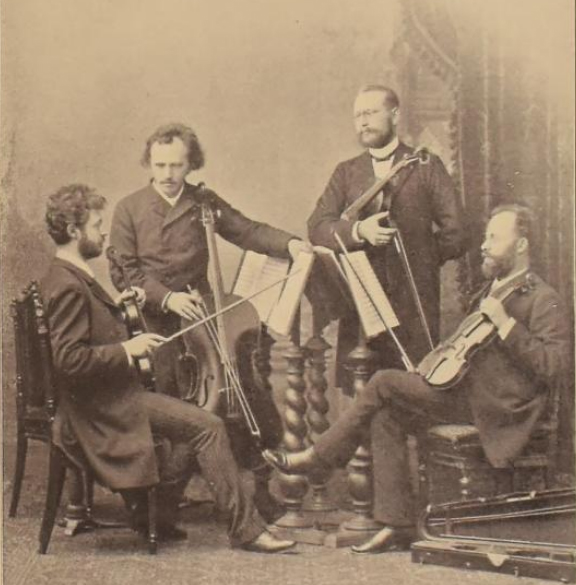
Henri Petri's String Quartet: Henri Petri, Alwin Schroeder, Bernhard Unkenstein, Carl August Robert Bolland

The Petri Quartet was a string quartet that existed from 1889 to 1914 and was based in Dresden. It was named after the primarius Henri Petri, who was the concertmaster of the Dresden Staatskapelle and the Dresden Hofkapelle. After Petri's death, Gustav Havemann took over the leadership and the quartet was renamed "Dresdner Streichquartett der Königlichen Kapelle".

The musicologist Paul Nettl counted the Petri Quartet among the most famous quartet associations of the 19th century. It especially cultivated the music of Ludwig van Beethoven, but also works of the romantic and modern periods. In 1909 it gave a guest performance in the Beethovenhalle at the Chamber Music Festival in Bonn. In the same year, on the occasion of the XXXIII Tonkünstlerfest of the Allgemeiner Deutscher Musikverein in Dresden, the ensemble was scheduled to perform the 1st String Quartet, op. 7 by Arnold Schönberg. However, they rejected the piece as unplayable and the Rosé Quartet, which had already been responsible for the premiere, had to take over the performance.

In 1907, the painter Robert Sterl made an oil painting depicting the musicians Petri, Warwas, Spitzner and Wille. Until the loss of the war, it was part of the collection of the Gemäldegalerie Alte Meister in Dresden and was shown at the Great Art Exhibition in 1908. The original negative (black and white) can be found in the Deutsche Fotothek of the Saxon State and University Library Dresden.

== Members ==
- 1. Violin: Henri Petri (1889–1914)
- 2. Violin: Max Lewinger (1889–1899), Egon Petri (1899–1901), Theodor Bauer (1901–1911) and Erdmann Warwas (1911–1914)
- Viola: Theodor Bauer (1889–1899), Bernhard Unkenstein (1899–1901) and Alfred Spitzner (1901–1914)
- Violoncello: Georg Wille (1889–1914)
