= Josef Magnus Wehner =

German playwright

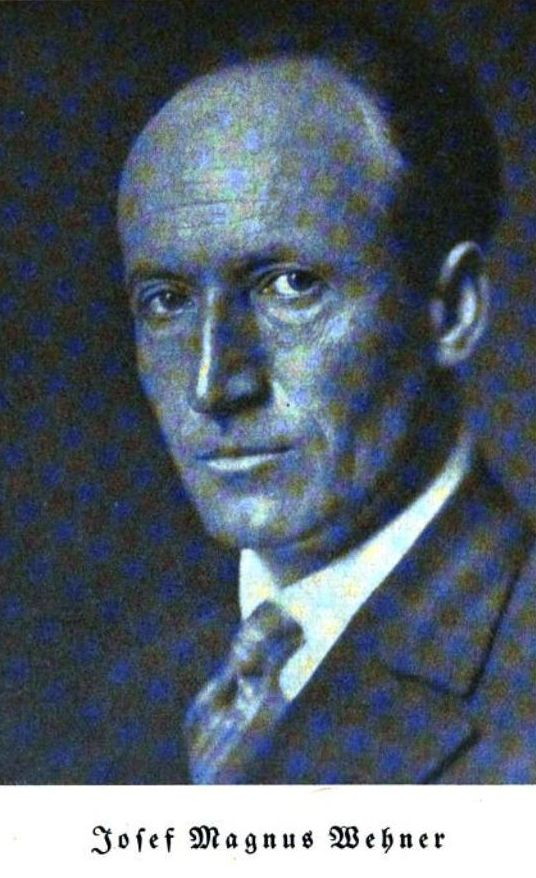
- Wehner in 1933
- Born: 14 November 1891; Bernbach
- Died: 14 December 1973 (aged 82); Munich
- Occupations: writer and playwright

Josef Magnus Wehner (14 November 1891 in Bernbach – 14 December 1973 in Munich) was a German writer and playwright. Celebrated (locally, in Fulda) as a "great German poet" his reputation is criticized for the militarism displayed in his work and his allegiance to the NSDAP.

Wehner was one of the 88 German authors who signed the Gelöbnis treuester Gefolgschaft, a 1933 "promise of most loyal obedience" to Adolf Hitler. After the war, he wrote a number of feast plays for religious occasions, including celebrations for Rabanus Maurus and Saint Boniface. In a 1988 study of Wehner, Joachim Hohmann concluded that Wehner's past was too easily forgotten and that his reputation as a Catholic Heimatdichter was undeserved and white-washed his national socialist past.

== Works (selection) ==
- Das Fuldaer Bonifatiusspiel. Fulda: Parzeller, 1954.
- Die Versuchung des Rabanus Maurus. Fulda, 1956.
