= Olga Schwind =

German musician (1887–1979)

- Born: 8 May 1887; Saarbrücken, Germany
- Died: 12 May 1979 (aged 92); Ronco sopra Ascona, Switzerland
- Occupations: Musician (voice and instrumental) musicologist

Olga Schwind (8 May 1887 – 12 May 1979) was a German musician. An instrumentalist and singer, she was a pioneer of the authentic instruments movement, which insisted that as far as practical music from earlier periods should be performed using instruments of the period when the music was written or, failing that, replicas.

== Life ==
Olga Schwind was born in Saarbrücken where her father worked as a jurist at the district court. However, the family came from nearby Tholey where her paternal grandfather Johann Theodor Schwind, a lawyer, had been posted from Berlin and worked as the court clerk. Theodor Franz Schwind, her father, had grown up in the family home which had been converted from the refractory of a former Benedictine monastery, and married Bertha Heise, the daughter of the local postmaster. Olga and her younger brother spent much of their early childhood with their grandparents, growing up in the magical ambience of the abbey church, the monastery gardens and monastic ruins that adjoined the family home.

Later she attended school in Saarbrücken and then in 1903 went on to take a "finishing year" with the Ursulines at a convent across the border, in Belgium, at which stage she was already involving herself with organising student musical presentations. She returned to Saarbrücken by 1905, learning to play the guitar using an instrument which she shared with her brother. She also taught herself to play the lute, reaching the point at which she became a teacher of the instrument at Saarbrücken's newly established music conservatory.

Between 1905 and 1907 she rapidly became interested in the sounds made by historic instruments and in classical music, which she followed up by consulting old folios, tablets and handwritten manuscripts, attempting to understand how pre-industrial instruments would have been used, using old images and other contemporary sources. During the decades that followed, working with craftsmen, she would successfully create replicas of old instruments, including harps, panpipes, portatives and hurdy-gurdies. During this time she also took several trips to Basel in order to seek out medieval texts and chants in the university archives.

In 1907 she moved to Munich where she studied the lute with Robert Kothe (1869–1947) who after a year sent her on to his own teacher, Heinrich Scherrer (1865–1937) for further lessons. In 1910 she came into contact with Louis Pinck, a priest based in Metz who was also a music teacher, a noted folklorist and a folksong collector. Together they traveled in Lorraine (which had been part of Germany since 1870/71), embarking on a project to collect the folk music of the region. Pinck documented the lyrics and Schwind wrote down the melodies of the folk songs they came across.

In 1918 she first made contact with Corry de Rijk. They discovered a shared enthusiasm for ancient music, and over the next few decades toured Europe extensively in pursuit of their interest. The women were friendly with the princesses of the von Wied family, as a result of which many aristocratic doors were opened to them across Germany, Austria and Italy, where Schwind and de Rijk gave their Musica Antiqua concerts together, sometimes privately and sometimes in public. One high point was a performance at Huis Doorn, home to the exiled German Emperor Wilhelm II. Another, a little later, took place in Rome in front of Pope Pius XII. At the same time Schwind maintained her contacts in her home region, the Saarland, where locally she acquired the status of a minor celebrity. During 1935 she was back home, campaigning prominently in the Saar status referendum campaign in favour of reunification.

In 1939 she went into exile in Ticino, Switzerland. Her music was no longer in favour with the authorities, and there was a concern that her Dutch partner might face arrest in Germany. During the war years she lived on in Switzerland in relative poverty. Friends provided accommodation and also, sometimes, food. The concerts became infrequent.

After 1945 Schwind remained in Ticino. Within the canton she moved house several times between 1945 and 1953, her material circumstances evidently improving again, little by little. There was a series of concerts in London in 1953. In 1954 there came a parting of the ways with Conny de Rijk, but she continued to give musical performances with other accompanists mostly, now, in southern Germany.

The intervention of friends enabled her to relocate again, in 1955, to the "Casa Pineta" (loosely: "house surrounded by pine trees") at Ronco sopra Ascona, and in 1957 the house was acquired on her behalf by a Mrs. Johanna Becker from Saarbrücken. It was here, on the shore of Lake Maggiore, that she would live out the rest of her life. In 1957 she teamed up with the feminist writer Ilse Reicke, and the two of them took to giving house concerts in the Casa Pineta. Although there is mention of Olga Schwind having "retired" in 1955, other sources suggest that she was still undertaking Musica Antiqua winter concert tours, at least as far as southern Germany, during the later 1950s.

A 1952 newspaper report on a concert appearance in the drafty confines of Schloss Elmau (near Garmisch) provides an engaging glimpse of Olga Schwind as "the master of Musica Antiqua with her unique collection of instruments, dating back as far as the ninth century, and her extensive repertoire of Medieval and Baroque songs in all the languages". There can be little doubt that by the time Olga Schwind died in the Casa Pineta on 12 May 1979, that unique collection of ancient instruments had become significantly larger.

Olga Schwind never married and she had no children. She had nephews and nieces because of her younger brother, but after they grew up the siblings grew apart. Her nephew gained the impression from his relatively straight-laced father that his aged aunt had followed an alternative somewhat "Bohemian" path, tainted by a certain "artistic craziness". Her death triggered the pressing challenge of preserving her collection. The solution came from Tholey where her grandfather had lived and where she had spent her childhood, and where now much of her collection is displayed in the basement of the local museum. Other items from her collection have found their way, apparently on a permanent basis, into the collection of the Basel Historical Museum.
