= Henri Petri =

Dutch violinist (1856–1914)

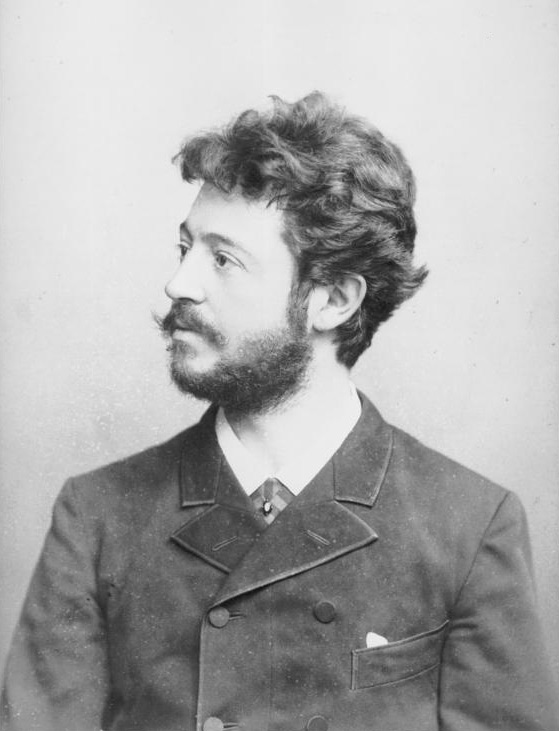
Henri Petri

Henri Willem Petri (5 April 1856 – 7 April 1914) was a Dutch violinist, music pedagogue, composer and arranger who spent his entire career in Germany.

== Life ==
Born in Zeist, Petri came from a musical family. His father was an oboist in the city orchestra of Utrecht; his cousin Willem Petri (1865-1950) was an organist, pianist and music pedagogue, and another cousin, Martinus Petri (1853-1924), was also a violinist and conductor. He received his first violin lessons within the family, and after his father's death with the concertmaster Dahmen of the Utrechts Symfonie Orkest. From 1871 to 1874, he studied with Joseph Joachim at the Hochschule für Musik in Berlin and was singled out as one of his favourite pupils. Petri was one of the soloists at the celebrations for Joachim's 50th and 60th anniversaries as a performer in 1889 and 1899. In 1877, Petri performed Spohr's "Gesangscene" Violin Concerto in a minor at the Crystal Palace Concerts in London. Subsequently, he was a regular soloist with the Gewandhaus Orchestra, the Berlin Philharmonic, and other regional orchestras. From 1877 to 1881, he was concertmaster at the Fürstliche Hofkapelle Sondershausen and from 1881 to 1882 in Hanover. In October 1882 he became concertmaster of the famous Gewandhausorchester in Leipzig. He remained in this position until 1889; he then became Royal Saxon concertmaster (Königliche Sächsischer Konzertmeister) at the Dresdner Hofkapelle, (present-day Staatskapelle Dresden) . He held this position for twenty-five years, until his death from pneumonia in 1914.

In addition to being concertmaster, he took over after the death of Eduard Rappoldi in 1903 as Professor of Music and head of the strings department at the Dresden Conservatory (today the Hochschule für Musik Carl Maria von Weber Dresden). Among his students were the conductor Willem Mengelberg, the composers Gustav Carl Luders, Dora Pejačević, Arno Starck, and the violinists Franz Spiess and Alberto Bachmann.

Petri led various chamber music ensembles. Together with Bolland, Thümer and Klengel (later A. Schröder) he made up the Gewandhaus Quartet during his Leipzig years. In Dresden, he founded his own Petri Quartet together with Erdmann Warwas (violin), Alfred Spitzner (viola) and Georg Wille (cello). Their concert series in Dresden lasted until 1914. There is a portrait of the string quartet painted in 1907 by Robert Sterl.

Petri made a large number of arrangements and editions for the violin. While in Leipzig, Petri became friends with the composer Ferruccio Busoni. Busoni dedicated his second String Quartet Op. 26 to Petri, as well as the Violin Concerto Op. 35a, whose premiere he gave in 1897 with the Berlin Philharmonic, conducted by Busoni himself.

His son Egon Petri (1881-1962) was an important pianist who studied with Busoni.

== Compositions ==
=== Vocal music ===
==== Songs ====
- 1884 Sechs Lieder, for voice and piano, op. 4
  1. Die Waise "Sie haben mich geheissen" - text: Adelbert von Chamisso
  2. Volkslied: "Hat dich ein blühendes Blümchen" - text: A. Träger
  3. Trost "Glücklich wer auf Gott vertraut" - text: August Heinrich Hoffmann von Fallersleben
  4. Neig' schöne Knospe - text: Mirzə Şəfi Vazeh
  5. Die Ablösung "In Schnee und Eis in kalter Nacht" - text: Robert Reinick
  6. Die Quelle "Uns're Quelle kommt in Schatten" - text: Adelbert von Chamisso
- 1884 Lieder - Lieder aus Williram, for voice and piano, op. 5 - text: E. Kühne
  1. Lied der Berthradis "Schlafe nur ein, mein Kind"
  2. Die Engel droben sind rein und schön
  3. Die Blume senkt das Köpfchen
  4. Ging ein munt'rer Vogelsteller
  5. Gute Nacht: "Im tiefsten Innern"
- Lieder, for voice and piano, op. 6
  1. Vergissmeinnicht: "Wild bewachs'ne Felsen" - text: A. von Tettau
  2. Tobe! tobe mein Herz - text: A. von Tettau
  3. Du bist so still, so sanft, so innig - text: Emmanuel Geibel
  4. Wie des Mondes Abbild zittert - text: Heinrich Heine
  5. Das Rosenband: "Im Frühlingsschatten" - text: Friedrich Gottlieb Klopstock
- Wiegenlied: Guten Abend, gute Nacht (after Johannes Brahms)

=== Chamber music ===
- 1884: Sechs kleine Stücke, for violin and piano, op. 1
- 1884: Albumblatt und Barcarole, for violin and piano, op. 2
- 1884: Drei Fantasiestücke, for violin and piano, op. 3
- 1900: Die hohe Schule des Violinspiels - Werke berühmter Meister des 17. u. 18. Jahrhunderts Bd. I, Nr. 1-7., for violin and piano
- 1910: Die hohe Schule des Violinspiels nr. 1, (Nr. 1-10), for violin and piano
- 1910: Die hohe Schule des Violinspiels nr. 2, (Nr. 11 - 20), for violin and piano
- 18 kleine Duette, for 2 violins
- Träumerei, for violin and piano - dedicated to Pauline Erdmannsdörfer-Eichtner

=== Work for violin ===
- 1885: Künstler-Etüden, for violin solo, op. 9
