= Volk ohne Raum =

German political slogan

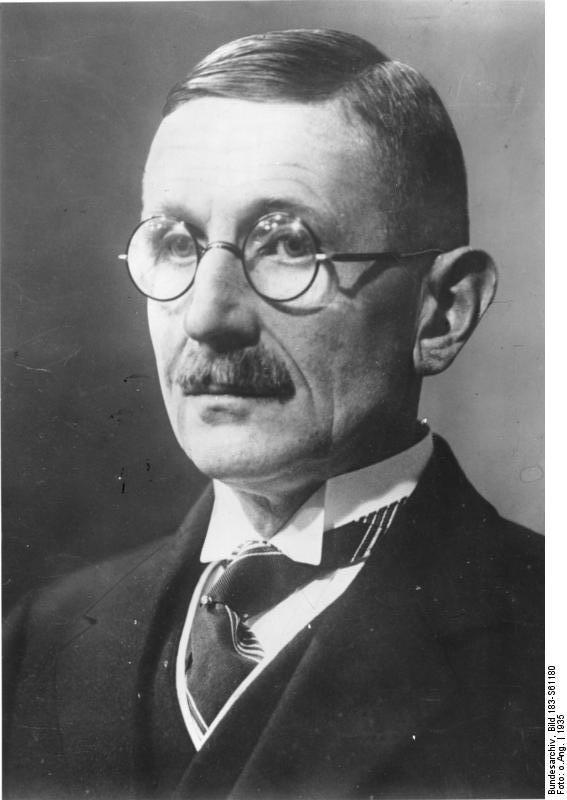
Portrait of Hans Grimm, German nationalist writer who coined the political slogan "Volk ohne Raum"

"Volk ohne Raum" (German pronunciation: [fɔlk ˈʔoːnə ˈʁaʊm]; "people without space") was a political slogan used in the Weimar Republic and Nazi Germany. The term was coined by the nationalist writer Hans Grimm with his novel Volk ohne Raum (1926). The novel immediately attracted much attention and sold nearly 700,000 copies.

== Use ==
The slogan was used in a political context to suggest that the Germans had become a people without living space (Lebensraum), struggling with poverty, misery, hunger and overpopulation as a result of to the Treaty of Versailles which served to deprive Germany of her colonial empire. Closely linked to this idea was the claim that the earth was divided unfairly among the Great Powers, leaving the Germans possessing little land compared to the less populous European nations.

The best-known usage of the slogan is by the Nazis. In Nazi propaganda, the slogan was repeatedly used to justify or legitimize the German conquest of Poland and the Soviet Union. Nazi Germany also used it to justify the massive territorial expansion into Eastern Europe to ensure Germanic Aryan Herrenvolk ("Aryan master race") rule over Slavs who the Nazis considered "non Aryan" and subhuman. Slavs were to be ethnically cleansed and exterminated, and their territories settled by Germans.

From the early days of the Nazi party, the notion that the Germans were people without living space and that they had a right to expand was widespread among German nationalists and right-wing organisations. On February 24, 1920, Hitler proclaimed the party program and one of the 25 points of the National Socialist Program stated: "We demand land and territory (colonies) for the sustenance of our people, and colonization for our surplus population." In order to justify their Drang nach Osten ("desire to push East"), the Nazis amended the slogan of Volk ohne Raum by declaring the vast, sparsely populated lands of Russia a Raum ohne Volk (a "space without people") which had to be conquered by Germany, the "nation without space".

== See also ==
- Blood and soil
- Drang nach Osten
- Lebensraum
