= Das Deutsche Führerlexikon 1934/1935 =

Biographical lexicon in Nazi Germany

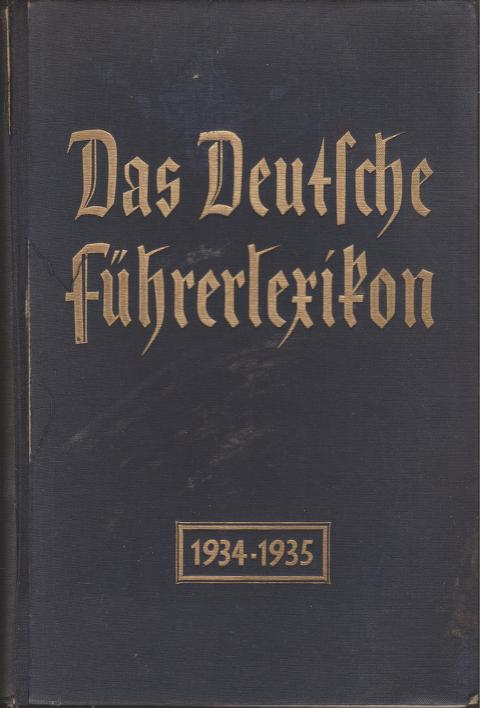
- Author: Verlagsanstalt Otto Stollberg
- Publication date: 1934
- Publication place: Germany

Das Deutsche Führerlexikon 1934/1935 was a German 'Who's Who' first published in May 1934, with official approval from the Nazi regime. It featured biographies of significant individuals connected with the Nazi Party, as well as diplomatic officers and military figures. A corrected version, featuring blank spaces where the biographies of purged individuals had previously appeared, was produced in August.

Historian David Lerner used the Führerlexikon as the basis for an analysis of prominent individuals in the Nazi Party and the Third Reich. This was first published in 1951 under the title The Nazi Elite, and later reproduced in the book Lerner co-authored with Harold D. Lasswell, World Revolutionary Elites: Studies in Coercive Ideological Movements (1966).
