= Erich Feyerabend =

German painter (1889–1945)

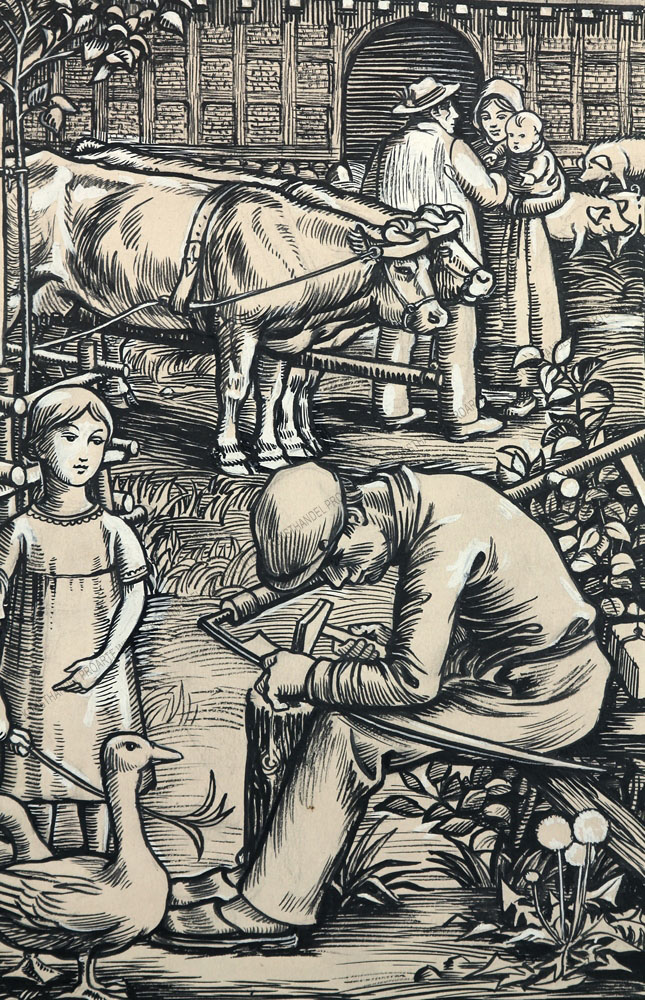
A Farm Family

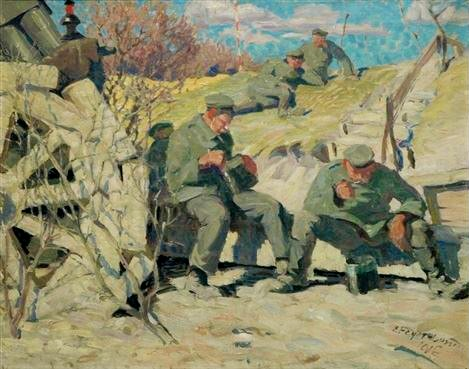
Lunch in the Trenches

Erich Feyerabend (19 November 1889, Rees - 18 October 1945, Bad Friedrichshall) was a German painter and woodcut artist.

== Life and work ==
Although born in western Germany, he grew up and completed a commercial apprenticeship in Berlin. Later, he was admitted to the Berlin University of the Arts, where he studied with the landscape painter, Friedrich Kallmorgen, among others. During World War I, he was a Lieutenant in the reserves, and worked as a war artist. Upon completing his studies, he became a free-lance artist and graphic designer. It was then that he produced his first woodcuts, of fairy tales and legends, that were used as book illustrations; notably for a new edition of Dreizehnlinden, an epic by Friedrich Wilhelm Weber. He also began exhibiting, and joined the Deutscher Künstlerbund.

His career proceeded uneventfully, until the Nazi seizure of power. Following the death of President Paul von Hindenburg in 1934, he was one of the signatories to a document, presented by the "Aufruf der Kulturschaffenden" (Call to Cultural Workers), supporting a referendum to combine the offices of President and Chancellor. In the latter part of the 1930s, he began to focus on large-scale woodcuts. Many were idealized city views, commissioned by municipal governments.

In 1938, he was appointed head of the woodcutting class at the State Academy of Fine Arts in Stuttgart, succeeding Gottfried Graf, whose works had been deemed "Degenerate". From then until 1944, he was represented at all the major art exhibitions, including the Große Deutsche Kunstausstellung, which featured Nazi-approved art. In 1943, he was officially welcomed to an exhibit in Kraków by the head of the General Government, Hans Frank, who came to be known as the "Polish Butcher".

He spent most of World War II in Stuttgart. After 1941, he held the title of Professor and became the Academy's Director, following its merger with the Kunstgewerbeschule; succeeding Fritz von Graevenitz, who had resigned due to illness. When the war ended, the Academy's new administration terminated his employment. He went to the spa city of Bad Friedrichshall to rest, but died there shortly after, from pneumonia. He was interred nearby, in Bad Wimpfen.

On his birthday in 2001, the city of Rees named a street after him. Following numerous complaints, concerning his cooperation with the Nazis, it was renamed "Anne Frank Straße" in 2020.
