= Hans Grimm =

German writer (1875–1959)

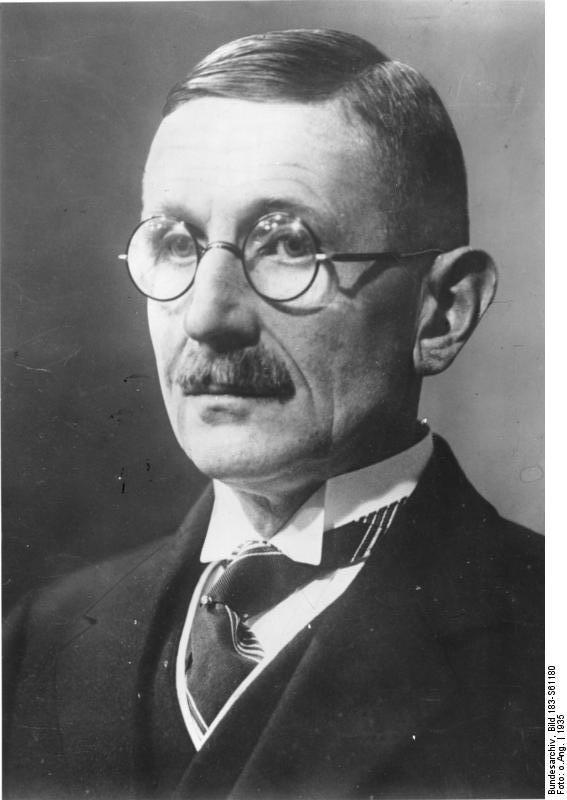
Hans Grimm (1935)

Hans Grimm (22 March 1875 – 29 September 1959) was a German writer. The title of his 1926 novel Volk ohne Raum became a political slogan of the expansionist Nazi Lebensraum concept.

== Early life ==
Hans Grimm was born in Wiesbaden, in the Prussian province of Hesse-Nassau, the son of Julius Grimm (1821–1911), a professor of law who retired early and devoted his time to private historical and literary studies and to political activity as a founder member of the National Liberal Party, which he represented in the Prussian Abgeordnetenhaus parliament, and also as a founder member of the German Colonial Society. His mother, Marie Grimm (1849–1911) was a daughter of the Austrian sparkling wine manufacturer Robert Schlumberger, ennobled von Goldeck in 1878.

Shy and reclusive as a child, Hans Grimm showed an interest and aptitude for writing and in 1894 started to study Literature and French at the University of Lausanne. Under pressure from his father, however, he left university in 1895 and went into business, working for a German company in Great Britain (in Nottingham and London), and then in the British-ruled Cape Colony (in Port Elizabeth and East London), where he also rented a small farm.

== Works ==
Grimm's South African sojourn lasted fourteen years, from 1897 to 1911, and it had a profound effect on him: with few minor exceptions all his literary work — several collections of short stories and novels — is set in Southern Africa. His most famous novel is Volk ohne Raum (1926). The programmatic title "A people without space" indicates Grimm's belief that Germany's problems, exacerbated by defeat in the First World War, were caused by its lack of space at home or in overseas colonies: individuals, and therefore the nation, were unable to develop to their fullest potential. The novel established him as one of Germany's leading writers and demonstrated clearly his political sympathies with the political Right in Weimar Germany, and the title became a popular slogan of the National Socialist movement. The commercial success of this work – sales of the single volume edition amounted to 500,000 by 1943 - clearly shows the extent to which it struck a chord with German readers in the 1920s and 1930s.

From a strictly literary point of view — and leaving their ideological bias to one side — the most readable of Grimm's works are, however, his Novellen and short stories, in which the discipline imposed by restricted space forces him to abandon the discursive wordiness of Volk ohne Raum (1344 pages in the one-volume edition).

== Nazism ==
Grimm had been a sympathizer of the National Socialists since 1923. He was never a member of the NSDAP, but he openly campaigned in the Göttinger Tageblatt newspaper for Hitler's second ballot in the 1932 Reich presidential election. Grimm believed that only they could restore German national dignity and economic and political stability, but his relationship with the Party — of which he never formally became a member — became increasingly strained, as he fell out of sympathy with the illegality of its methods.

In a centenary address (Der verkannte Hans Grimm, Lippoldsberg 1975), designed to restore Grimm’s reputation, Klaus von Delft was able to cite letters of complaint from Grimm to the Nazi authorities on a number of subjects: the infringement of the right of confidentiality at the ballot box; the behaviour of the Hitler-Jugend and the Nazi student association; the coupling of foreign and domestic policy issues in the 1936 referendum on Hitler's rule; and criticism of Hitler’s presentation of the murders of the "Night of the Long Knives" in 1934 as due judicial process. It is, however, indicative of Grimm's stance that von Delft is not able to find or cite any criticism of National Socialist racial policy. In 1938 Grimm was threatened with imprisonment by Propaganda Minister Joseph Goebbels and withdrew from public life.

Despite everything, however, even after 1945 Grimm remained true to his political convictions. In a pamphlet Die Erzbischofsschrift. Antwort eines Deutschen, (1950), a response to a message from the Archbishop of Canterbury to the German people, Grimm described Germany's war of aggression as an attempt to defend "European Culture" against Communism and blames Great Britain for escalating a local conflict into a global war. He even justified the Holocaust on the basis of a warped reading of Deuteronomy 20:13, 16; the publication met with a storm of criticism in Germany and abroad. In 1954, having failed to gain a seat in the West German parliament for the extreme right-wing "Deutsche Reichspartei", he published a detailed defence of National Socialism under the title Warum, woher aber wohin? (Why, whence, but whither?).

== Later life ==
In the late 1930s, Grimm lived in Lippoldsberg (Wesertal) restoring a number of monastic buildings that were left over from World War I. Consolidating his interest in real estate after World War II, he finished buying the monasteries, which were essentially fixer-uppers. Nevertheless, he was far from being overwhelmed with repairing these monasteries. He actually found enough time after 1949 to devote to his numerous literary activities, publishing his Lippoldsberger Dichtertage (Lippoldsberg Writers' Congresses).

He died in 1959 in Lippoldsberg.

== Selected works ==
Fiction:

- Südafrikanische Novellen, 1913
- Der Gang durch den Sand, 1916
- Die Olewagen-Saga, 1918
- Der Richter in der Karu und andere Novellen, 1926
- Volk ohne Raum, 1926
- Die dreizehn Briefe aus Deutsch Südwestafrika, 1928
- Das deutsche Südwester-Buch, 1929
- Was wir suchen ist alles. Drei Novellen, 1932
- Der Ölsucher von Duala. Ein afrikanisches Tagebuch. 1933
- Lüderitzland. Sieben Begebenheiten, 1934

published posthumously:

- Kaffernland. Eine deutsche Sage, 1961 (written 1911-15)
- Heynade und England, 1969/70 (written 1937-45)

Non-fiction:

- Englische Rede : wie ich den Engländer sehe [The Englishman as I see him], 1938 (published in English and German)
- Die Erzbischofsschrift. Antwort eines Deutschen, 1950 (published in English translation by Lyton Hudson as Answer of a German: an open letter to the Archbishop of Canterbury, 1952
- Warum, woher aber wohin? 1954
