= Sigmund Feyerabend =

German bookseller and publisher (1528–1590)

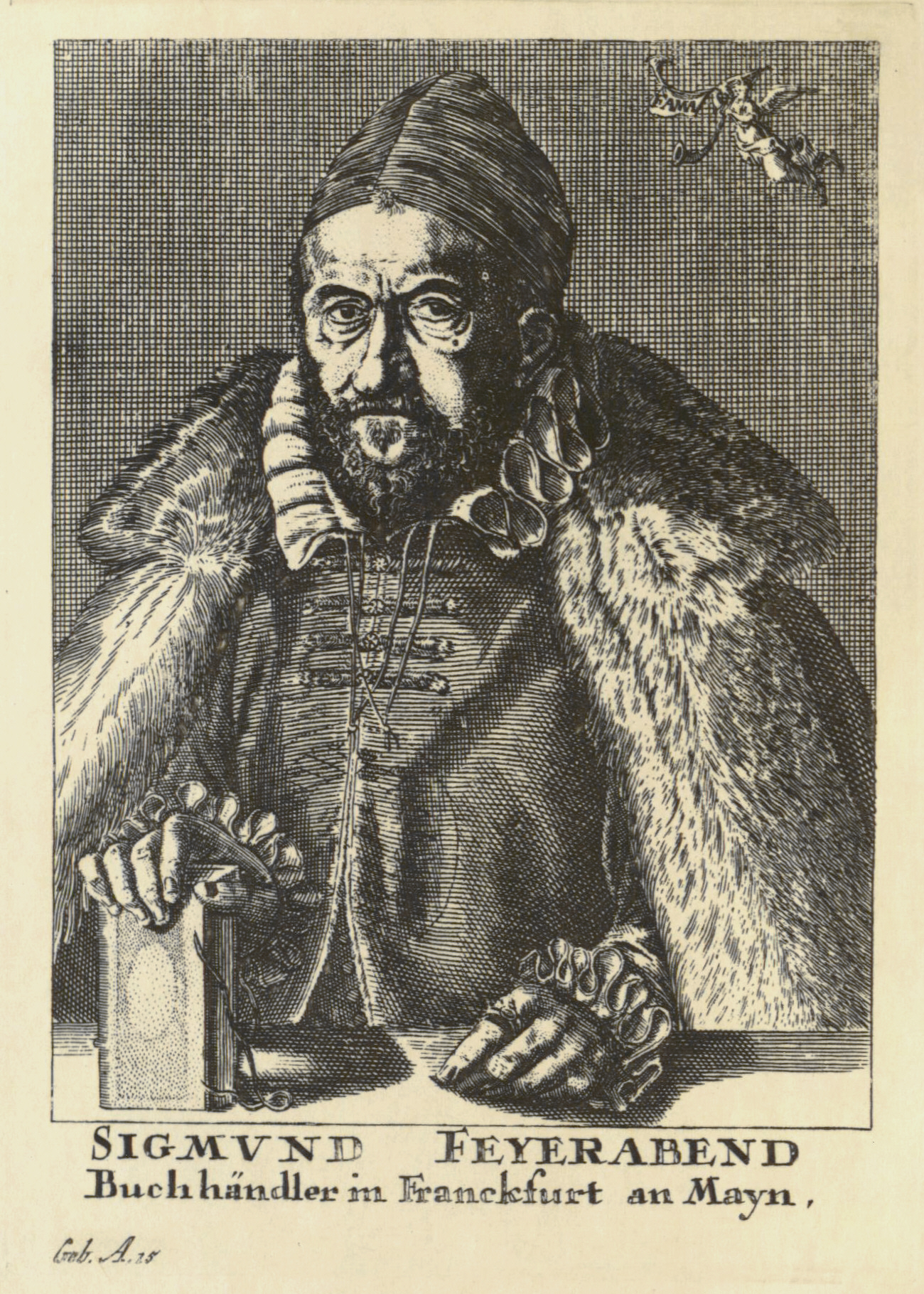
- Contemporary portrait of Feyerabend
- Born: 1528; Frankfurt, Holy Roman Empire
- Died: 22 April 1590 (aged 61–62); Frankfurt, Holy Roman Empire
- Known for: Books
- Movement: Northern Renaissance

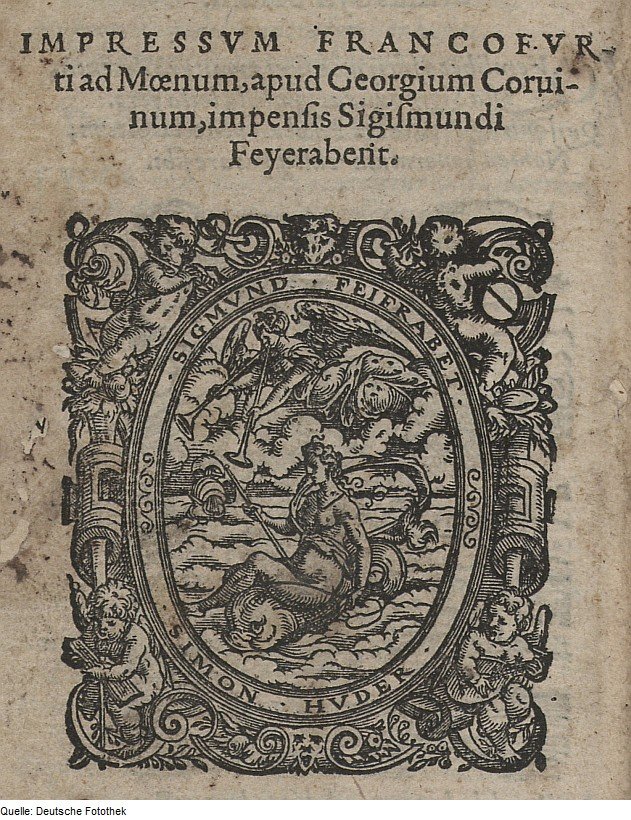
Printers mark from Feyerabend, 1568

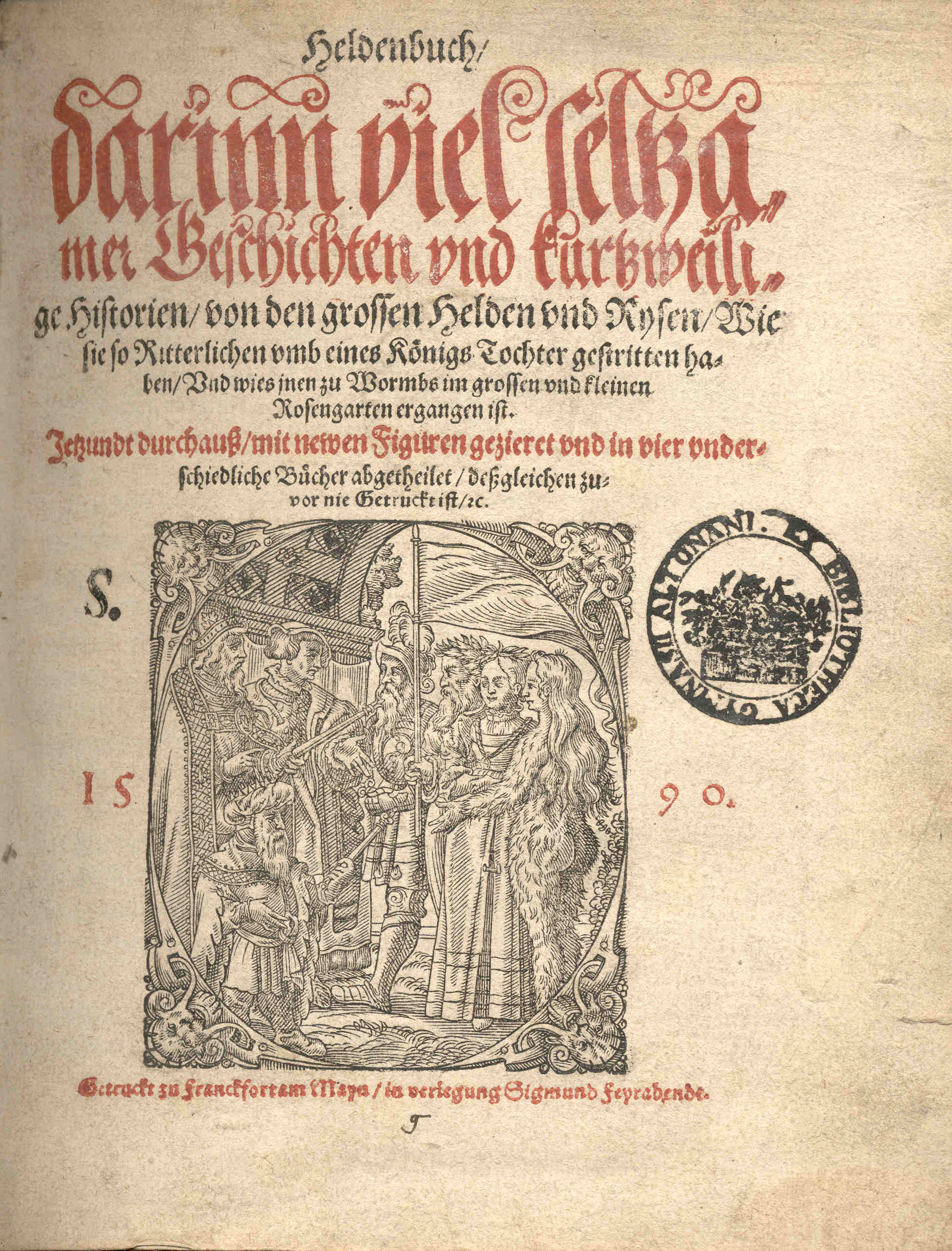
Title page of the 1590 edition of the Heldenbuch, illustrated by Virgil Solis and Jost Amman

Sigmund Feyerabend (1528– 22 April 1590) was a bookseller and publisher at Frankfort. To him are attributed the woodcuts from the designs of Virgil Solis in a German Bible printed at Frankfort in 1561, and the portraits of the Doges of Venice in Kellner's Chronica, also printed at Frankfort in 1574. He died in 1590. He signed his cuts with SF or a monogram. Several of his relations also were wood-engravers, and one of them, M. Feyerabend, who worked about 1578, executed several figures after Melchior Lorch.

His business was highly successful, but his son-in-law, Kuno Wiederhold, married to Katharina Maria Feyerabend, incurred heavy debts, leaving little for the younger, minor son, Karl Sigmund Feyerabend (+ 15 Jul 1609).
