= Agnes Miegel =

German author, journalist and poet

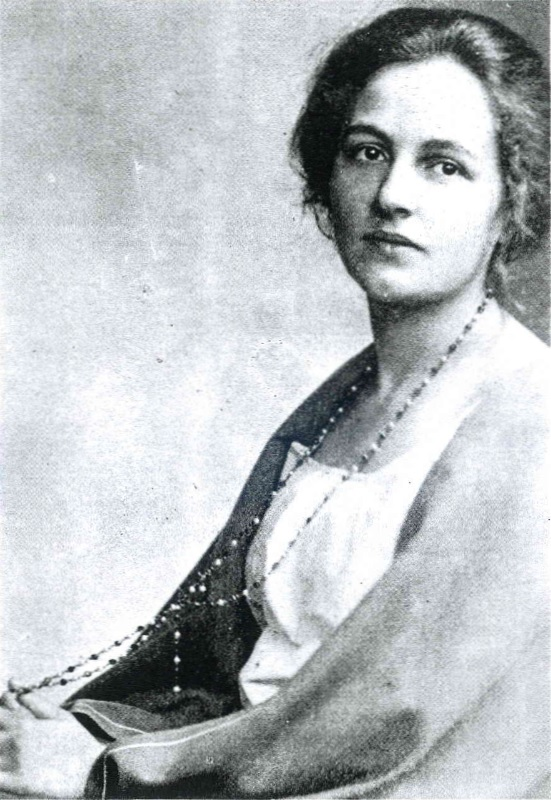
- Born: 9 March 1879; Königsberg, Province of East Prussia, Kingdom of Prussia, German Empire
- Died: 26 October 1964 (aged 85); Bad Salzuflen, North Rhine-Westphalia, West Germany

Agnes Miegel (9 March 1879 – 26 October 1964) was a German author, journalist and poet. She is best known for her poems and short stories about East Prussia, but also for the support she gave to the Nazi Party.

== Biography ==
Agnes Miegel was born on 9 March 1879 in Königsberg into a Protestant family. Her parents were the merchant Gustav Adolf Miegel and Helene Hofer.

Miegel attended the Girls' High School in Königsberg and then lived between 1894 and 1896 in a guest house in Weimar, where she wrote her first poems. In 1898 she spent three months in Paris. In 1900 she trained as a nurse in a children's hospital in Berlin. Between 1902 and 1904 she worked as an assistant teacher in a girls' boarding school in Bristol, England. In 1904 she attended teacher training in Berlin, which she had to break off because of illness. She also did not complete a course at an agricultural college for girls near Munich. In 1906 she had to return to Königsberg to care for her sick parents, especially her father, who had become blind. Her mother died in 1913, her father in 1917.

As early as 1900 her first publications had drawn the attention of the writer Börries von Münchhausen. Her first bundle of poems was published thanks to his financial support. In later years he was still an untiring promoter of her work.

She lived in Königsberg until just before it was captured in 1945, and wrote poems, short stories and journalistic reports. She also made a few journeys. During the Third Reich she revealed herself as an ardent supporter of the regime. She signed the Gelöbnis treuester Gefolgschaft, the 1933 declaration in which 88 German authors vowed faithful allegiance to Adolf Hitler. In the same year she joined the NS-Frauenschaft, the women's wing of the Nazi Party. In 1940 she joined the Nazi party itself. In August 1944, in the final stages of World War II, she was named by Adolf Hitler as an "outstanding national asset" in the special list of the most important German artists who were freed from all war obligations.

In February 1945 she fled by ship from the approaching Red Army and reached Denmark. After Denmark's liberation on 5 May 1945 she stayed in the Oksbøl Refugee Camp until November 1946. In 1946 she returned to Germany, where she was under a publication ban until 1949. In that year a denazification committee issued a declaration of no objection.

At first she stayed in Apelern with relations of her former patron Börries von Münchhausen, who had committed suicide in 1945. In 1948, being a refugee, she was assigned a house in Bad Nenndorf, where she kept writing until her death.

Agnes Miegel now mainly wrote poems and short stories about East Prussia, the land of her youth. She was considered the voice of the Heimatvertriebene, the German-speaking people who had lived before the war in Czechoslovakia and Poland and in parts of Germany annexed by Poland and the Soviet Union after the war, who had to leave when Nazi Germany was defeated. Miegel received the honorary title Mutter Ostpreußen ("Mother East Prussia") from her admirers.

She died on 26 October 1964 in a hospital in Bad Salzuflen.

== Literary career ==
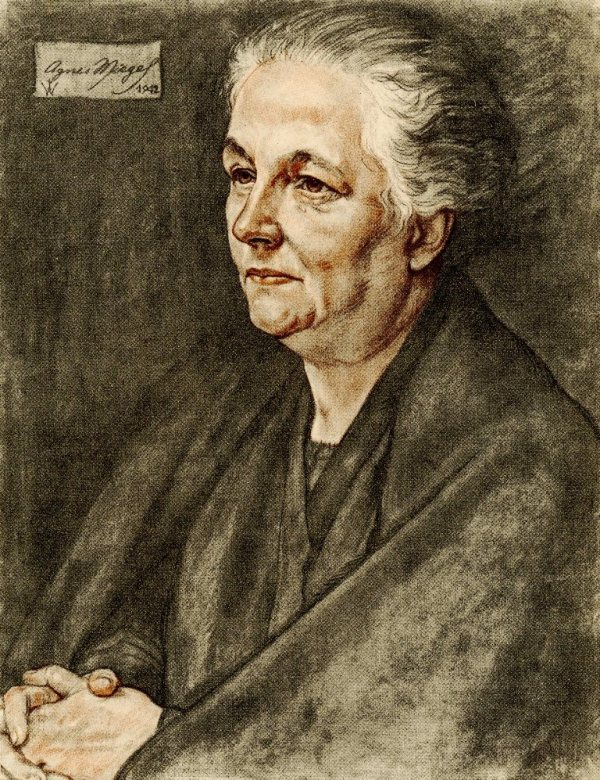
Agnes Miegel by Wolfgang Willrich, 1942

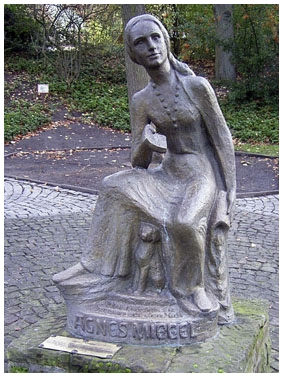
Agnes-Miegel-Denkmal in Bad Nenndorf

Miegel's first bundle of poems appeared in 1901 and was called Gedichte. By 1945 she had published 33 books of poems, short stories and plays. She also regularly wrote for newspapers (especially the Ostpreußische Zeitung) and magazines. In her early career she mainly wrote about universal themes like man's course of life, nature, life in the countryside, the relationship with God and the past (especially the German past). A minority of these poems and stories were set in East Prussia, and these became her most popular works. Her most famous early poem was Die Frauen von Nidden ("The Women of Nidden", 1907), in which the village of Nidden (present-day Nida in Lithuania) falls victim to a bubonic plague epidemic. The seven women who survive the plague let themselves be buried alive by the drifting sand dunes near the village.

During the Third Reich National Socialist themes appear in her work: complaints about the "heavy yoke" borne by cities like Memel and Danzig, which had been separated from Germany after the First World War; glorification of the war; glorification of the mothers who bear German children. But as early as her 1920 poem "Über der Weichsel drüben" ("On the other side of the Vistula") (republished in Ostland) she propagated fear of the Poles, who, she suggested, wanted to overrun East Prussia. She wrote two odes to Adolf Hitler. The first of these, Dem Führer, was published in 1936 and cited in Werden und Werk (1938), a study of Miegel's life and works. The second poem, An den Führer, is, in Tauber's words, an "hysterical adulation" of Hitler, published as a kind of preface in Ostland. In the Soviet occupation zone in Germany after the Second World War both Werden und Werk and Ostland were forbidden books. To her credit it may be said that her works were free from antisemitism, although by no means free from the Nazis' Blut und Boden ideology.

After her publication ban had been lifted in 1949, she mainly wrote about East Prussia as she remembered it. The title of her first bundle of poems after the war is characteristic: Du aber bleibst in mir ("You however stay within me"). Her best known stories and poems are melancholic reflections on her Heimat (homeland) that had been destroyed and was now forever out of reach. This is certainly true of her most famous poem, Es war ein Land ("That was a country", 1949). Blackbourn shows that this was "exactly the idealized image that the expellee organisations cultivated – as if all had been pastoral harmony until the Red Army marched west, as if the mass flight of Germans had fallen out of a clear blue sky."

She was not vindictive towards the Russians and Poles who had taken possession of East Prussia. In a poem from 1951 she urged her readers nichts als den Haß zu hassen ("to hate nothing but hate").

She refused to account for her doings during the Nazi era. The only thing she was willing to say was: Dies habe ich mit meinem Gott alleine abzumachen und mit niemand sonst ("I have to settle this with my God and with no one else").

Publications of her works in Germany after 1945 usually omit her works between 1933 and 1945, propagating the myth of an apolitical author.

Miegel's poems usually consist of lines of unequal length, some rhyming and some not.

Marcel Reich-Ranicki included three of her poems (Die Schwester, Die Nibelungen and Die Frauen von Nidden) in his anthology of exemplary German literature Kanon lesenswerter deutschsprachiger Werke (Part Gedichte, 2005).

== Reputation ==
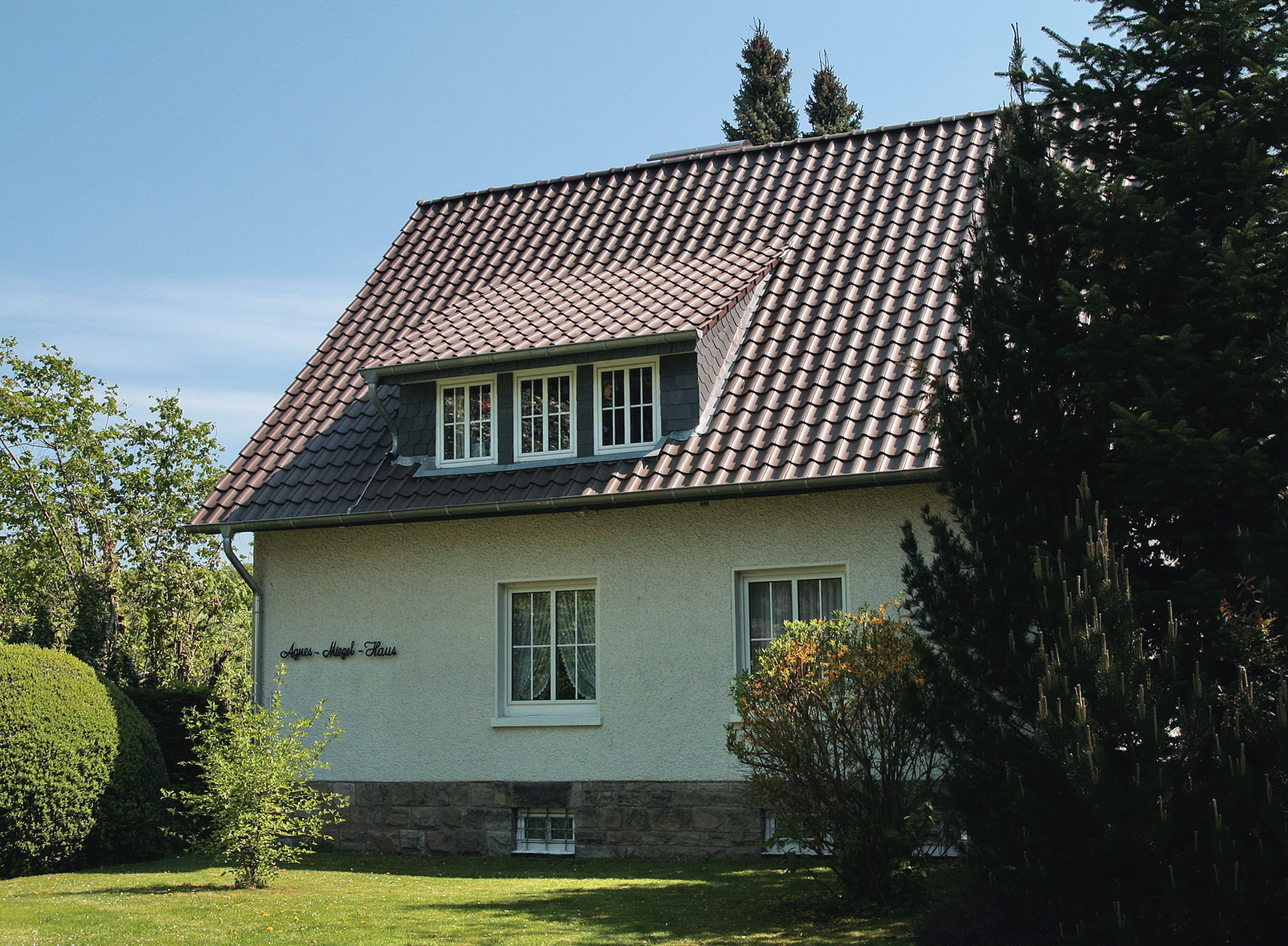
The Agnes-Miegel-Haus in Bad Nenndorf

During her lifetime Agnes Miegel received several marks of honour. In 1916 she received the Kleist Prize for lyrics and in 1924 was awarded an honorary doctorate by the University of Königsberg.

During the Nazi era she was overloaded with marks of honour. In 1933 she joined the writers' section of the Akademie der Künste in Berlin, together with prominent Nazis such as Hanns Johst. They filled the vacancies that had arisen because some members, amongst them Alfred Döblin and Thomas Mann, had to give up their seats for not being loyal to the Nazi regime. In 1935 she received the "honorary ring" of the Allgemeiner Deutscher Sprachverein and in 1936 the Johann-Gottfried-von-Herder-Preis (the predecessor of the Herder Prize). In 1939 she was made an honorary citizen of Königsberg; in the same year she received the Golden Decoration of the Hitlerjugend (Hitler Youth). In 1940 she received the Goethe Prize of the city of Frankfurt. In 1944 Adolf Hitler and Joseph Goebbels put together a "Gottbegnadeten-Liste" of the most important artists of the Third Reich. A separate list, the Sonderliste der Unersetzlichen Künstler ("special list of irreplaceable artists"), put together by Hitler himself, mentioned those 25 people whom the Nazi leaders considered as the Third Reich's greatest artists. Agnes Miegel was (with Gerhart Hauptmann and Hanns Johst, among others) ranked as one of the six greatest German writers. The artists on the special list were freed from all war obligations.

After the Second World War she received, inter alia, the Westfälischer Kulturpreis (1952), the Großer Literaturpreis of the Bayerische Akademie der Schönen Künste (Bavarian academy of fine arts) (1959) and the Kulturpreis der Landsmannschaft Westpreußen (1962). In 1954 she became an honorary citizen of Bad Nenndorf, her place of residence.

After her death her house in Bad Nenndorf was rechristened the Agnes-Miegel-Haus. It is now a museum, dedicated to her life and works, and situated in the Agnes-Miegel-Platz ("Agnes Miegel Square"). In several places in Germany, streets received the name Agnes-Miegel-Straße. A few schools were named Agnes-Miegel-Schule. In 1979 the Deutsche Bundespost issued a postage stamp in honour of her 100th birthday.

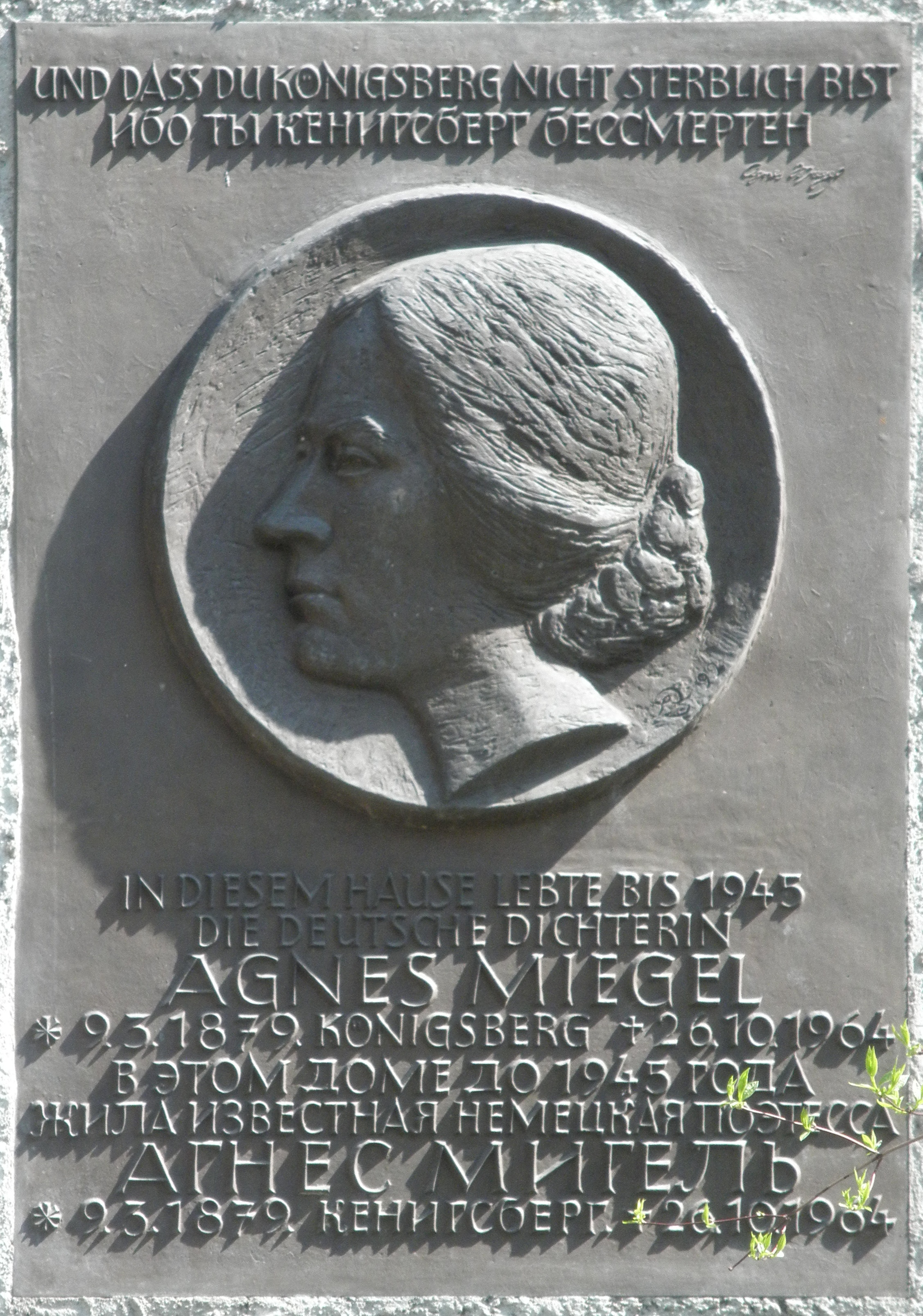
Commemorative plaque at Agnes Miegel's former dwelling house in Königsberg/Kaliningrad

There is a monument dedicated to Agnes Miegel in Wunstorf. A monument in Bad Nenndorf has been removed in 2015. In Filzmoos near Salzburg there is a plaque dedicated to the Hofers, Miegel's mother's family, who had their roots there. On 26 October 1992 a plaque was put on her former dwelling house in Königsberg, now Kaliningrad, with texts in German and Russian.

Miegel's reputation was badly damaged when her poems to Hitler were rediscovered and published on the internet in the 1990s. Much discussion arose about her Nazi past. As a result, all the schools and many streets that had been named after her have been renamed. For instance, Agnes-Miegel-Schule in Willich was renamed Astrid-Lindgren-Schule in 2008 and the Agnes-Miegel-Straße in St. Arnold in the Steinfurt district was renamed Anne-Frank-Straße in 2010. After a lengthy dispute about whether the Miegel monument in Bad Nenndorf should be kept or removed, it was removed in February 2015.

== Works ==
=== Poems, short stories, plays ===
- 1901: Gedichte, Cotta, Stuttgart.
- 1907: Balladen und Lieder, Eugen Diederichs, Jena.
- 1920: Gedichte und Spiele, Eugen Diederichs, Jena.
- 1925: Heimat: Lieder und Balladen, Eichblatt, Leipzig.
- 1926: Geschichten aus Alt-Preußen, Eugen Diederichs, Jena.
- 1926: Die schöne Malone: Erzählungen, Eichblatt, Leipzig.
- 1927: Spiele, Eugen Diederichs, Jena.
- 1928: Die Auferstehung des Cyriakus: Erzählungen, Eichblatt, Leipzig.
- 1930: Kinderland: Erzählungen, Eichblatt, Leipzig.
- 1931: Dorothee: Erzählungen, Gräfe und Unzer, Königsberg in Preußen.
- 1932: Der Vater: Erzählungen, Eckhart, Berlin.
- 1932: Herbstgesang: Gedichte, Eugen Diederichs, Jena.
- 1933: Weihnachtsspiel, Gräfe und Unzer, Königsberg in Preußen.
- 1933: Kirchen im Ordensland: Gedichte, Gräfe und Unzer, Königsberg in Preußen.
- 1934: Gang in die Dämmerung: Erzählungen, Eugen Diederichs, Jena.
- 1935: Das alte und das neue Königsberg, Gräfe und Unzer, Königsberg in Preußen.
- 1935: Deutsche Balladen, Eugen Diederichs, Jena.
- 1936: Unter hellem Himmel: Erzählungen, Eugen Diederichs, Jena.
- 1936: Kathrinchen kommt nach Hause: Erzählungen, Eichblatt, Leipzig.
- 1936: Noras Schicksal: Erzählungen, Gräfe und Unzer, Königsberg in Preußen.
- 1937: Das Bernsteinherz: Erzählungen, Reclam, Leipzig.
- 1937: Audhumla: Erzählungen, Gräfe und Unzer, Königsberg in Preußen.
- 1937: Herden der Heimat: Erzählungen mit Zeichnungen von Hans Peters, Gräfe und Unzer, Königsberg in Preußen.
- 1938: Und die geduldige Demut der treuesten Freunde: Versdichtung, Bücher der Rose, Langewiesche-Brandt, Schäftlarn.
- 1938: Viktoria: Gedicht und Erzählung, Gesellschaft der Freunde der deutschen Bücherei, Ebenhausen.
- 1939: Frühe Gedichte (reissue of the 1901 collection), Cotta, Stuttgart.
- 1939: Herbstgesang, Eugen Diederichs, Jena.
- 1939: Die Schlacht von Rudau: Spiel, Gräfe und Unzer, Königsberg in Preußen.
- 1939: Herbstabend: Erzählung, published by herself in Eisenach.
- 1940: Ostland: Gedichte, Eugen Diederichs, Jena.
- 1940: Im Ostwind: Erzählungen, Eugen Diederichs, Jena.
- 1940: Wunderliches Weben: Erzählungen, Gräfe und Unzer, Königsberg in Preußen.
- 1940: Ordensdome, Gräfe und Unzer, Königsberg in Preußen.
- 1944: Mein Bernsteinland und meine Stadt, Gräfe und Unzer, Königsberg in Preußen.
- 1949: Du aber bleibst in mir: Gedichte, Seifert, Hameln.
- 1949: Die Blume der Götter: Erzählungen, Eugen Diederichs, Köln.
- 1951: Der Federball: Erzählungen, Eugen Diederichs, Köln.
- 1951: Die Meinen: Erzählungen, Eugen Diederichs, Köln.
- 1958: Truso: Erzählungen, Eugen Diederichs, Köln.
- 1959: Mein Weihnachtsbuch: Gedichte und Erzählungen, Eugen Diederichs, Köln (a new, extended edition appeared in 1984).
- 1962: Heimkehr: Erzählungen, Eugen Diederichs, Köln.

=== Selections and collected works ===
- 1927: Gesammelte Gedichte, Eugen Diederichs, Jena.
- 1952: Ausgewählte Gedichte, Eugen Diederichs, Köln.
- 1952-1955: Gesammelte Werke, Eugen Diederichs, Köln (six volumes).
- 1983: Es war ein Land: Gedichte und Geschichten aus Ostpreußen, Eugen Diederichs, München (reprinted by Rautenberg, Leer in 2002).
- 1994: Spaziergänge einer Ostpreußin, Rautenberg, Leer (journalism 1923–1924).
- 2000: Wie ich zu meiner Heimat stehe, Verlag S. Bublies, Schnellbach (journalism 1926–1932).
- 2002: Die Frauen von Nidden: Gesammelte Gedichte von unserer ‘Mutter Ostpreußen’, Rautenberg, Leer.
- 2002: Wie Bernstein leuchtend auf der Lebenswaage: Gesammelte Balladen, Rautenberg, Leer.

== Books about Agnes Miegel ==
- Walther Hubatsch, Ostpreussens Geschichte und Landschaft im dichterischen Werk von Agnes Miegel, Agnes-Miegel-Gesellschaft, Minden, 1978.
- Harold Jensen, Agnes Miegel und die bildende Kunst, Rautenberg, Leer, 1982.
- Marianne Kopp, Agnes Miegel: Leben und Werk, Husum Druck- und Verlagsgesellschaft, Husum 2004.
- Agnes Miegel, Werden und Werk, mit Beiträgen von Professor Dr. Karl Plenzat, Hermann Eichblatt Verlag, Leipzig, 1938. (This is what the title page says. In fact this is a study by Plenzat about Miegel's work, with a foreword by Miegel herself and many citations from her work.)
- Anni Piorreck: Agnes Miegel. Ihr Leben und ihre Dichtung. Eugen Diederichs, München, 1967 (a corrected edition appeared in 1990).
- Alfred Podlech (editor), Agnes-Miegel-Bibliographie, Agnes-Miegel-Gesellschaft, Minden, 1973.
- Annelise Raub, Nahezu wie Schwestern: Agnes Miegel und Annette von Droste-Hülshoff, Grundzüge eines Vergleichs, Agnes-Miegel-Gesellschaft, Bad Nenndorf, 1991.
- Ursula Starbatty, Begegnungen mit Agnes Miegel, Agnes-Miegel-Gesellschaft, Bad Nenndorf, 1989.

== External links (all in German) ==
- Literature about Agnes Miegel in the Katalog der Deutschen Nationalbibliothek
- Website of the Agnes-Miegel-Gesellschaft
- Agnes Miegel in the ‘Literaturatlas Niedersachsen’
- About Agnes Miegel's Nazi sympathies
- The Agnes-Miegel-Gesellschaft about Agnes Miegel's Nazi sympathies
- Detlev Beyer-Peters about Agnes Miegel
- Report on the renaming of the Agnes-Miegel-Straße in Münster
