= Wilhelm Keilmann =

German pianist, Kapellmeister and composer

Wilhelm Martin Keilmann (4 August 1908 – 14 November 1989) was a German pianist, Kapellmeister and composer. He composed 74 works, founded a chamber orchestra and was lecturer at the Richard-Strauss-Konservatorium München.

== Life ==
Born in Würzburg, Keilmann received his first instructions in violin and piano playing from his father, Ferdinand Keilmann, a music teacher.

He first studied at the Musikschule Aschaffenburg with director Hermann Kundigraber, Heinz Knettel and Valentin Härtl. After one semester at the Musikhochschule München he changed to the Konservatorium Würzburg, where he studied piano under Professor Heinz Knettel, violin and viola under Willy Schaller and conducting as well as composing under privy councillor Hermann Zilcher.

Wilhelm Keilmann passed the Staatsexamen with distinction in all four subjects on July 13, 1937, and his commissioned work "Hymne an die Schönheit" after Christian Morgenstern for soprano, choir and orchestra (op. 4) was premiered by Tilla Briem and the Munich Philharmonic on July 15, 1937, in Bad Kissingen.

After a year as Kapellmeister at the Mainz City Theatre he married the violinist Hertha Bulle (10 August 1916) and moved with her in 1939 at the outbreak of war as a music teacher couple to a rural boarding school in Schondorf am Ammersee. There they both also worked as concert artists and gave private lessons in their instrumental subjects. Keilmann built up choirs and knew how to inspire the pupils for music. During this time he composed, among other things, the "Würzburger Bilder" for piano and a series of songs, often with a humorous background.

In 1942, the director of the German philharmonic choir, Doctor Bruno Kittel, engaged him in Berlin as choir director and répétiteur. In 1943 Keilmann gave concerts in German military hospitals with recitals of songs and duets with Tilla Briem (soprano) and Fred Drissen (bass baritone). In the last year of the war, Keilmann was drafted and ended up being captured by the Americans.

After the war, he first established an important piano class in Aschaffenburg, which was to make a name for itself for a long time. Later, he followed a call to the Richard Strauss Conservatory (formerly Trapp's Conservatory) in Munich where he taught piano and composition from 1959 to 1975. As an accomplished piano accompanist, he developed the subject "Prima-Vista", a methodical and stimulating instruction for playing the sheet music, which was translated into English and Japanese by Edition Peters under no. 8065 in Henry Litollf's Verlag / C.F. Peters (Frankfurt, London, New York) and published in two volumes in 1970.

In 1975 Keilmann ended his active teaching activities in Munich and, from his "Haus Harmonie" in Bad Kohlgrub, devoted himself above all to the "Murnauer Kammerorchester", which he founded in 1966 and which has given master concerts every year since 1951 with his wife Hertha Keilmann in the concert hall Haus Harmonie, the church choir Bad Kohlgrub and the composition. His versatility as a pianist, conductor and composer has been exceptionally appreciated by world-famous personalities such as Elly Ney, Ludwig Hoelscher, Wilhelm Stross, Kieth Engen, Detlef Kraus, Fred Drissen, Oscar C. Yatco, Josef Märkl, Rudolf Metzmacher, Tilla Briem, Lore Fischer, Pamela Coburn and many others.

Many of his most important works were created between 1975 and 1989. The "Sonnengesang" for soprano and String orchestra op. 45, the "Elegie et Allegro giocoso" for alto saxophone, the String Quartet op. 61, the "Vollmondnächte" op. 62, "Mainau-Insel im Blütenzauber" op. 63 and the 2nd Cello Sonata op. 65 as well as the Piano Quartet in F sharp minor op. 60.

On 14 November 1989 Keilmann died in Brixen aged 85 due to heart failure during a holiday in South Tyrol. He was laid to rest at the Rochus cemetery in Bad Kohlgrub.

== Selected compositions ==
- op. 4: Hymne an die Schönheit (Christian Morgenstern) for mixed choir, solo soprano and orchestra(1935)
- op. 32/c: Klavierschule Ich spiele vom Blatt – short recital studies for piano in three parts, lower and intermediate level (1970)
- op. 45: Der Sonnengesang for soprano and string orchestra (after texts by Francis of Assisi) (1971)
- op. 62: Vollmondnächte. Song cycle for soprano and piano (after Japanese poems adapted by Manfred Hausmann (1986)
- op. 60: Piano Quartet in F sharp minor for violin, viola, violoncello and piano (1984)
- op. 64/a: Duo for violin and cello (1988)
- op. 65: 2nd Sonata in F sharp minor for violoncello and piano (1989)

== Work ==
=== Piano music ===
- Es ist ein Ros’ entsprungen. Drei Weihnachtsvariationen op. 1 (1933)
- Würzburger Bilder op. 13 (1941)
- Hymnus gloriosus in honorem ducis excellentissimi Lenau. Präludium und Fuge in As-Dur op. 24 (1980)
- Über das schlaraffische Freundschaftslied. Variation und Fuge op. 28 (1979)
- Maria durch ein Dornwald ging. Drei Variationen op. 34 (1933)
- "Stato d’animo della sera" al lago d’Iseo. Kurze Impressionen op. 44/a (1970)
- "Movimenti d’onde" al lago d’Iseo. Kurze Impressionen op. 44/b (1970)
- Notturno in E-Dur op. 56 (1984)
- Kinderportraits. Impressionen op. 58 (1979)
- Mainau – Insel im Blütenzauber. Zwölf Impressionen op. 63 (1987)
- Gioco da Colori per Pianoforte op. 64/b (1988)

=== Orchestral works and choral works with orchestra ===
- Hymn to Beauty (Christian Morgenstern) for mixed choir, solo soprano and orchestra op. 4 (1935)
- Solstice for mixed choir, soprano, baritone solo and orchestra op. 7 (1936)
- Der Weg nach Bethlehem Christmas cantata for soli, mixed choir, small orchestra and piano op. 40 (1962)
- Der Sonnengesang for soprano and string orchestra (after texts by St. Francis of Assisi) op. 45 (1971)

=== Piano school ===
- Ich spiele vom Blatt. short recital studies for piano in three parts, lower and intermediate level op. 32/c (1970)
- Introduction to sight reading : at the piano or other keyboard instrument.

=== Film music ===
- Hakahana Music for the eponymous film from Southwest Africa of the Rheinische Missionsgesellschaft, Wuppertal-Barmen, a Walter Leckebusch production, realized by Matthias-Film-Gesellschaft, Stuttgart op. 42/b (1956)

=== Sonatas, Trios and Quartets ===
- Sonata No. 1 in D minor for violoncello and piano op. 15 (1943)
- Sonata in B minor for violoncello and piano op. 26/b (1951)
- Trio sereno for flute, contrabass and piano op. 36/a (1961)
- Chamber Sonata for viola and piano op. 43 (1964)
- Piano Quartet in F sharp minor for violin, viola, cello and piano op. 60 (1984)
- Sonata No. 2 in F sharp minor for violoncello and piano op. 65 (1989)

=== Lieder ===
- Lied der Erde an die Sonne for soprano and string orchestra (after a text by Christian Morgenstern) op. 18/a (1974)
- Wie sind die Tage schwer. Song cycle for baritone and piano (from "Musik des Einsamen" by Hermann Hesse) op. 26/a (1951)
- Gitanjali. Eight songs for bass baritone and piano (after texts by Rabindranath Tagore) op. 59 (1986)
- Vollmondnächte. Song cycle for soprano and piano (adapted from Japanese poems by Manfred Hausmann) op. 62 (1986)

== Publications ==
- Herzensblüthen. Erinnerungs-blätter 1869-1879.
