= Markl =

Markl or Märkl is a surname. Notable people with the surname include:

== Arts and entertainment ==
- Hugo Markl (born 1964), American artist
- Josef Märkl (1928–2010), German violinist, composer and educator
- Jun Märkl (born 1959), German conductor and music director
- Key-Thomas Märkl (born 1963), German-Japanese violinist and educator
- Kim Märkl (born 1961), American composer, writer and clarinetist
- Margarete Markl (1902–1981), Austrian sculptor
- Nuno Markl (born 1971), Portuguese comedian, writer and broadcaster

== Other fields ==
- Hubert Markl (1938–2015), German biologist
- Niklas Märkl (born 1999), German cyclist
- Volker Markl (born 1971), German computer scientist

== See also ==
- Märkl Quartet, a German string quartet
- Markle (disambiguation)
