= Märkl Quartet =

Former German string quartet

The Märkl Quartet was a German string quartet, which was based in Cologne from 1968 to 1991. It was named after the violinist Josef Märkl, who served as the string quartet's first violinist for the entire period.

== History ==
The origins of the ensemble lie in the Stross Quartet, whose tradition was continued after the death of Wilhelm Stross in 1966 by the former ensemble members Josef Märkl and Rudolf Metzmacher, a cello professor.

In addition to performances in the Federal Republic of Germany, the Märkl Quartet has undertaken concert tours to Austria, Belgium and Israel as well as to the US and Spain. On the occasion of the festivities for the 1976 bicentennial of the United States Declaration of Independence, the quartet played in Philadelphia, Pennsylvania. Märkl brought with his ensemble the String Quartets in D minor op. 45/1 (dedicated to Arno Breker) and E flat major op. 45/2 (dedicated to Alfred Cortot) by Wilhelm Kempff as well as the Variations on the Brazilian National Anthem by David Korenschendler for the premiere. In his documentation for Kempff's string quartets in 1968 and for Korenschendler's Variations in 1985, Stegmüller cites the years of the premieres (Quellenkataloge zur Musikgeschichte. Vol. 40). Noetzel, Wilhelmshaven 2007, ISBN 978-3-7959-0780-8, p. 158. The repertoire of the quartet included the music of the First Viennese School, the Romantic and the New Music. Several recordings (Beethoven, Arriaga, Egk) were made.

== Members ==
- 1. Violin: Josef Märkl (1968–1991)
- 2. Violin: Hanns-Heinz Odenthal (1968/69), Bernhard Deffner (1969–1971), Toshi Takada (1971–1974), Susanne Wieck (1974–1977), Wolfgang Kick (1977–1979), Key-Thomas Märkl (1980/81 and 1990/91) and David Johnson (1981–1990)
- Viola: Peter Pfuhl (1968–1970), Karl-Heinz Steeb (1970/71), Lutz Schröder (1971/72), Konrad Grahe (1972–1975), Ferdinand Erblich (1975/76), Bernhard Pietralle (1976–1986), Bernhard Oll (1986–1990) and Rüdiger Debus (1990/91)
- Violoncello: Rudolf Metzmacher (1968–1980), Traugott Schmöhe (1980/81), Manfred Becker (1981–1990) and Guido Schiefen (1990/91)

== Discography ==
- Ludwig van Beethoven: String Quartet op. 135 and 18/2 with the Stross Quartet (Aarton Music, 1983)
- Juan Crisóstomo de Arriaga: Streichquartette Nr. 1 und 2 Es-Dur (Aarton Music, 1983)
- Werner Egk: La Tentation de Saint Antoine and Juan Crisóstomo de Arriaga: String quartet no. 3 E flat major with Marijke Hendriks (mezzo-soprano) (Aarton Music, 1983)

== Literature ==
- Jürgen Stegmüller: Das Streichquartett. Eine internationale Dokumentation zur Geschichte der Streichquartett-Ensembles und Streichquartett-Kompositionen von den Anfängen bis zur Gegenwart. (Quellenkataloge zur Musikgeschichte. Vol. 40). Noetzel, Wilhelmshaven 2007, ISBN 978-3-7959-0780-8, p. 158.
