= Stross Quartet =

German string quartet

The Stross-Quartett (formerly "Quartet of the Cologne Student Period" and "Grümmer Quartet") was an important German string quartet from Cologne (1922-1931) and Munich (1934-1966) respectively. The quartet was named after the long-time primarius Wilhelm Stross.

== History ==
It was in the tradition of Joseph Joachim and, like the Klingler Quartet, the Busch Quartet, the Havemann Quartet, the Amar Quartet, the Wendling Quartet and the Strub Quartet, influenced decisively the German string quartet scene in the first half of the 20th century.

During the Second World War the members of the quartet were exempted from military service, which was a rarity. From 1940 the string quartet often played at Wehrmacht concerts. It also performed at NSDAP and Kraft durch Freude events and in military hospitals.

The ensemble was also able to continue its activities in Allied-occupied Germany. After the Second World War, the Stross Quartet became the most important German string quartet alongside the Koeckert Quartet. International concert tours led the ensemble through Europe as well as to Asia, Africa and South America. In the early 1960s the Goethe-Institut organized concerts in Turkey, the United Arab Emirates, Jordan, Cyprus and Greece. The quartet also performed with important foreign actors such as the Paris Loewenguth Quartet and the Vienna Philharmonic Wind Ensemble.

After the death of the founder in 1966, Ingo Sinnhoffer wound up the Stross Quartet. The violinist Josef Märkl and the cellist Rudolf Metzmacher founded the Märkl Quartet in 1968, continuing the tradition of the Stross Quartet.

The repertoire of the ensemble was very broad (among others Bach, Bartók, Reger, Blacher, Brahms, Bruckner, Dvořák, Fasch, Gál, Grieg, Haydn, Hindemith, Humperdinck, Pfizner, Ravel, Respighi, Smetana, Schumann, Verdi and Viotti). Above all, the cyclical performances of the works of Wolfgang Amadeus Mozart, Ludwig van Beethoven and Franz Schubert are of particular importance. Throughout its history the string quartet has performed premieres of modern compositions by Martin Karl Hasse, Oscar von Pander, Richard Trunk and Mordechai Sheinkman.

The Stross Quartet has made several recordings and radio broadcasts.

== Members ==
The string quartet was recast several times, with Wilhelm Stross almost always being Primarius:

- 1. Violin: Wilhelm Stross (1922–1929 and 1929–1966), Hans-Detlev Grümmer (1929) and Ingo Sinnhoffer (1966)
- 2. Violin: Otto Holm (1922–1929), Wilhelm Stross (1929), Hermes (1929–1931), Anton Huber (1934–1937), Franz Schmidtner (1937/38), Richard Heber (1938–1944), Karl-Albrecht Hermann (1944–1949), Heinz Endres (1949–1952), Kurt-Christian Stier (1952–1961), Oskar C. Yatko (1961–1964) and Josef Märkl (1964–1966)
- Viola: Fritz Lang (1921–1929), Hermann Zitzmann (1929), Otto Holm (1929–1931), Valentin Härtl (1934–1948 and 1952–1958), Siegfried Meinecke (1948–1952), Georg Schmid (1958–1961), Ingo Sinnhoffer (1961–1963) and Gérard Ruymen (1963–1966)
- Violoncello: Kurt Friedrich (1922–1929), Paul Grümmer (1929 and 1937–1940), A. Johnen (1929–1931), Anton Walter (1934–1937) and Rudolf Metzmacher (1940–1966)

== Discography ==
- Ludwig van Beethoven: String quartets op. 18/2 (1939) and op. 59/2 (Deutsche Grammophon, 1942)
- Wolfgang Amadeus Mozart: Streichquintett KV 516 (with Philipp Haaß, Deutsche Grammophon, 1942)
- Franz Schubert: String Quintet D 956 (with Heinz Decker, 1949 / with Oswald Uhl, Sound Star-Tonproduktion, 1964)
- Ludwig van Beethoven: String Quartet No. 16 op. 135 (Aarton-Music, 1965)
