= Metzmacher =

Metzmacher is a German surname. Notable people with the surname include:

- Ingo Metzmacher (born 1957), German conductor
- Pierre Émile Metzmacher (1842–1916), French painter
- Rudolf Metzmacher (1906–2004), German cellist
