= Josef Märkl =

German violinist

Josef Märkl (16 January 1928 – 14 October 2010) was a German violinist, composer and music educator. He was a member of the radio orchestras in Munich, Stuttgart and Baden-Baden. Most recently he was concertmaster of the Deutsche Oper am Rhein and primarius of the Märkl Quartet.

== Life ==
Märkl was born in Vilshofen an der Donau. He studied privately with Hedi Gigler, Roman Schimmer and Heinz Stanske as well as with Wilhelm Stross at the Hochschule für Musik und Theater München.

At the age of 17, 1945/46, he became a member (1st violin) of the Symphonieorchester des Bayerischen Rundfunks in Munich. From 1946 to 1950 he played with the Radio-Sinfonieorchester Stuttgart des SWR (renamed in 1949 to Sinfonieorchester von Radio Stuttgart bzw. des Süddeutschen Rundfunks) under Hans Müller-Kray. In 1947 he won the competition for young artists of the Süddeutscher Rundfunk. From 1950 to 1956 he worked with the SWR Sinfonieorchester Baden-Baden und Freiburg in Baden-Baden, conducted by Hans Rosbaud. In 1958 he became special concertmaster and director of studies with the Philharmonie Südwestfalen in Hilchenbach under Peter Richter de Rangenier and Thomas Ungar. From 1962 to 1968 he was engaged as study director and concertmaster with the Düsseldorf Symphony Orchestra, whose principal conductors were Jean Martinon and Rafael Frühbeck de Burgos.

From 1964 he played chamber music as successor of Oscar C. Yatco the 2nd violin in the famous Stross Quartet. Besides his teacher, his colleagues included Gérard Ruymen (viola) and Rudolf Metzmacher. (cello). Together with Metzmacher, he founded the Märkl Quartet in Cologne in 1968, with which he continued the tradition of the Stross Quartet in the function of Primarius. His younger son Key-Thomas Märkl was also a member of the string quartet at times. Furthermore, Märkl was founder and artistic director of the Wilhelm-Kempff-Ensemble. Märkl was involved in several radio and record productions.

Märkl was a lecturer for violin, viola and string quartet playing at the Rheinische Musikschule for over 25 years (from 1962 on at the Conservatory of the City of Cologne). He was a member of the European String Teachers Association. Schott Music published his multi-volume compendia for violin and viola.

He had three children with a Japanese pianist. His older son Jun Märkl (born in 1959) became a conductor, Key-Thomas Märkl (born in 1963) a violinist. The latter is associated with the writer and composer Kim Märkl. Märkl was married to Brigitte Märkl (1931-2011), née Jaenisch, until his death in 2010.

Märkl died in Seehausen am Staffelsee at the age of 82.

== Work ==
Textbooks

- Violintechnik intensiv (3 volumes, Schott, 1999/2000)

- Volume 1: Konditionstraining
- Volume 2: Bogentechnik.
- Volume 3: Einspielübungen "Fit in 20 Minuten"

- Violatechnik intensiv (2 volumes, Schott, 2004/05)

- Volume 1: Konditionstraining und Bogentechnik
- Volume 2: Einspielübungen 30 "Wake up"-Programme.

Compositions

- Carneval der Finger. 3 Etudes for the 2nd and 3rd finger (Schott, 2001)
- Paraphrasen über Paganinis Barucaba-Variationen for viola solo (Varner, 2006)

== Discography ==
- Ludwig van Beethoven: Streichquartette op. 135 and 18/2 with the Stross Quartet (Aarton Music, 1983)
- Juan Crisóstomo de Arriaga: String quartets no. 1 and 2 E flat major (Aarton Music, 1983)
- Werner Egk: La Tentation de Saint Antoine and Juan Crisóstomo de Arriaga: String quartet no. 3 E flat major with Marijke Hendriks (mezzo-soprano) (Aarton Music, 1983)
