= Markle =

Markle may refer to:

== People ==
- Abraham Markle (1770–1826), Upper Canadian businessman and politician
- Alvan Markle (1861–1931), American banker, businessman, engineer, and inventor
- Cliff Markle (1894–1974), American baseball pitcher
- Fletcher Markle (1921–1991), Canadian radio personality
- Jack Markle (1907–1956), Canadian ice hockey player
- Meghan Markle (born 1981), American former actress and now Duchess of Sussex
  - Family of Meghan, Duchess of Sussex, which includes:
    - Thomas Markle Sr. (born 1944), American retired lighting director; father of Meghan, Duchess of Sussex
- Minor M. Markle III (1935–2016), American scholar of ancient history
- Peter Markle (born 1952), American television director
- Roger A. Markle (1933–2020), American mining engineer and executive
- Sandra Markle (born 1946), American author of children's books
- Wilson Markle (born 1938), Canadian engineer who invented the film colorization process

== Places ==
- Markle, East Lothian, a village in Scotland
- Markle Castle, ruined castle in Scotland
- Markle, Indiana, a town in the United States

== Other uses ==
- Markle's sign, clinical sign in the right lower quadrant of the abdomen
- Markle Foundation, American charitable organisation concerned with technology, health care, and national security
- Markle Windsor Foundation (aka MWX and Sussex Royal), former UK charitable organisation (now dissolved)

== See also ==
- Markl, a surname
