= Op. 135 =

In music, Op. 135 stands for Opus number 135. Compositions that are assigned this number include:

- Beethoven – String Quartet No. 16
- Schumann – Gedichte der Königin Maria Stuart
- Shostakovich – Symphony No. 14
