= Ludwig Hoelscher =

German cellist

- Born: 23 August 1907; Solingen, German Empire
- Died: 8 May 1996 (aged 88); Tutzing, Germany
- Occupations: Classical cellist; Academic teacher
- Organizations: Elly Ney Piano Trio; Berlin University of the Arts; Musikhochschule Stuttgart; Academic teacher

Ludwig Hoelscher (23 August 1907 – 8 May 1996) was a German cellist. He played internationally as a soloist, and was well known as a chamber musician, first playing from 1932 in Elly Ney's piano trio, then in the Strub Quartet and other formations. He was an important cellist of the Nazi era, playing in propaganda concerts and teaching in Berlin and Salzburg. After the World War, he taught at the Musikhochschule Stuttgart and played internationally. He played the world premieres of more than 50 compositions.

== Life ==
Born in Solingen, Hoelscher was the youngest of three children of a jeweller and amateur violinist, who wanted to form a family string quartet. Ludwig began playing the cello at age six. From the age of nine he gained experience in domestic chamber music.

Hoelscher studied cello in Cologne, Munich, with Julius Klengel in Leipzig and with Hugo Becker in Berlin. He completed his studies with Wilhelm Lamping. In 1930 he received the highest recognition for music students. Hoelscher made his debut as a soloist in 1931 with the Berliner Philharmoniker conducted by Max Fiedler. His career began with meeting the pianist Elly Ney, who founded the Elly Ney Piano Trio in 1932 with him and violinist Wilhelm Stross. Theodor Hausmann dedicated his 1935 cello sonata, Op. 30, to Hoelscher and performed it with him. From 1934 to 1938, Hoelscher was the cellist of the Strub Quartet in Berlin.

== Career for Nazi propaganda ==
Hoelscher was one of the most important musicians of the Nazi era, which is reflected in his inclusion in the Gottbegnadeten list, published in August 1944, which set him free him from military service.

On 1 May 1937, Hoelscher became a member of the National Socialist German Workers' Party (membership number 5.156.776). Since 1 April 1937, the 29-year-old was a professor at the Berlin University of the Arts. On 29 May 1938, he was soloist in the final concert of the first Reichsmusiktage in Düsseldorf, where the Nazi propaganda exhibition on degenerate music was also shown. In the same year, Hoelscher performed at the Beethoven Days of the Hitlerjugend in Wildbad and at the cultural-political work camp of the Reichsjugendführer in Weimar and played for the "Lichtfest" in front of the staff of four industrial companies.

From 1938 Hoelscher also worked as professor at the Mozarteum in Salzburg. For the purpose of "cultural propaganda", he performed in 1942 in occupied Belgium at travelling concerts for the Wehrmacht in Antwerp, Ghent, Mechelen, Leuven, Lier and St. Niklaas. These concerts were repeated in 1943, with additional performances in Bucharest, Lemberg, Lublin and Warsaw. Only a few months before the end of the war, on 2 December 1944, he performed in Krakow with the Philharmonie des Generalgouvernements, an orchestra of Polish players founded by Hans Frank for propaganda purposes. Frank noted in his diary: "Krakow concert with Prof. Hoelscher". This concert, conducted by Hans Swarowsky, featured the premiere of Pfitzner's Krakauer Begrüßung, dedicated to Hans Frank.

== Career in post-war Germany ==
Despite membership in various Nazi organisations, besides the party also the Reichskolonialbund and the Nationalsozialistischer Altherrenbund, Hoelscher could continue his career after the Second World War. From 1954 to 1972, he was a professor at the Musikhochschule Stuttgart. Numerous concert tours took him around the world, including the first trip to Japan in 1953, where he became an honorary member of the Ueno University of Tokyo. Among many awards, he also received the honorary membership of the Beethoven House in Bonn.

Hoelscher formed a piano trio with Walter Gieseking and Gerhard Taschner. He played chamber music also with Hans Richter-Haaser, Wilhelm Kempff, Wilhelm Keilmann, Carl Seemann, Adrian Aeschbacher and Kurt Rapf. He premiered over 50 works, including compositions by Wolfgang Fortner, Hans Werner Henze, Ernst Krenek, Pfitzner, Günter Bialas, Harald Genzmer, Martin Karl Hasse, Karl Höller, Peter Jona Korn, Casimir von Pászthory, Joseph Rheinberger, Heinrich Sutermeister and Ermanno Wolf-Ferrari. He also played German premieres of works by Paul Hindemith. He made numerous recordings, some of which have also been released as CDs (Bayer Records; Hänssler Verlag; forgotten-records, France).

Hoelscher died in Tutzing at the age of 88.
