= Theodor Hausmann =

20th-century German composer

Theodor Hausmann (9 December 1880 – 19 June 1972) was a German composer.

== Life ==
Born in Elberfeld, Hausmann showed musical talent at the piano as a child. His strict Calvinist father, however, did not tolerate the performance of secular works and he forbade a further, better musical education. Hausmann therefore first completed a commercial apprenticeship. After his father's death in 1913, however, he switched to music and studied first under W. Franke and Hermann Unger in Cologne and after the First World War under Julius Weismann in Freiburg, Joseph Haas in Munich and Hermann Grabner in Leipzig.

After his studies he was offered a position as assistant to the conductor Philipp Wolfrum at the Philharmonic Orchestra in Heidelberg. One year later, Hausmann was appointed conductor of the Remscheid Opera Orchestra. After some mental breakdowns, Hausmann went to Icking for a cure. There he recovered and turned to composing. After initial successes he moved back to Heidelberg, where he made a name for himself as a composer and teacher.

In his old age he moved for a short time to a relative in South Africa but did not tolerate the country and its people and returned to Germany. Hausmann died in a nursing home in Weinheim at the age of 91. He was unmarried and left no children behind.

Among Hausmann's best works is his Cello Sonata op.30 from 1935, which was premiered by the renowned cellist Ludwig Hoelscher and was in his repertoire for many years.

== Work ==
- Streichquartett op.9
- Klaviertrio op.12
- Violinsonate op.16
- Cellosonate op.30
- Variationen über das Volkslied "Weißt du wieviel Sternlein stehen?, for piano op.31
- Streichtrio op.34
