= Pálma von Pászthory =

Hungarian violinist (1884–1958)

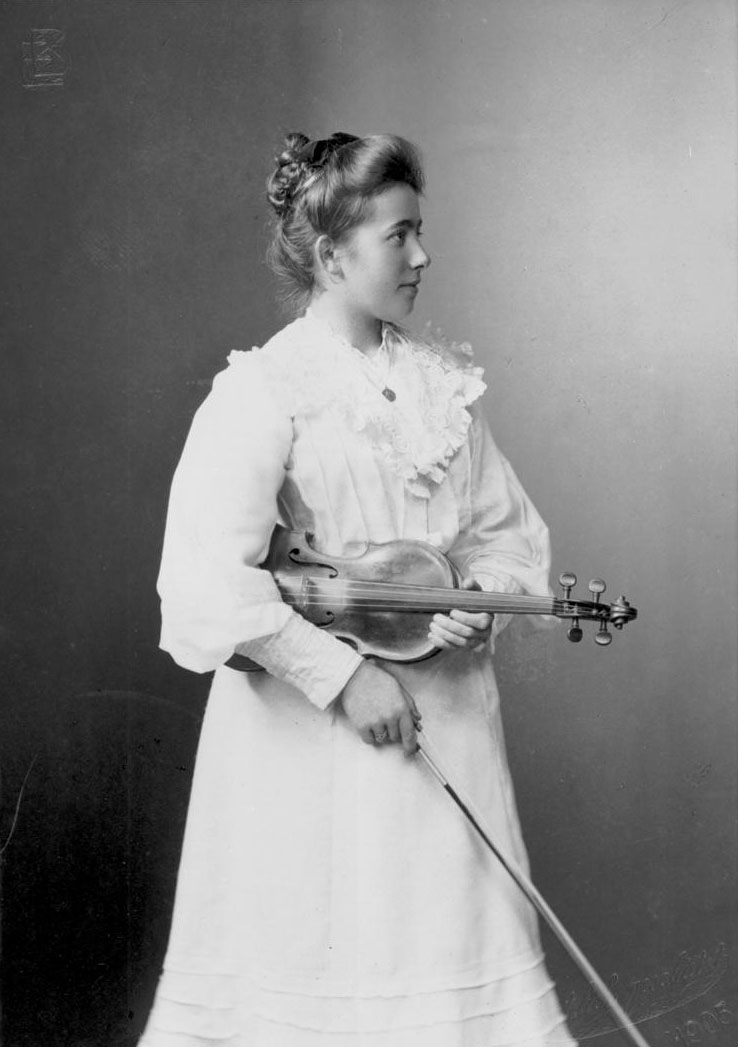
- Portrait of Pálma von Pásztory in 1905
- Born: 23 May 1884; Budapest, Hungary
- Died: 19 May 1958 (aged 73); Weilheim/Oberbayern, Germany
- Other names: Pálma von Pásztory-Erdmann
- Spouse: Hugo Erdmann (m. 1918; died 1942)
- Parents: Gisela von Pászthory; Johann von Pászthory-Rózsa
- Relatives: Casimir von Pászthory (brother)

Pálma von Pászthory (23 May 1884 – 19 May 1958) was a Hungarian violinist.

She studied in Vienna between 1891 and 1893 with Josef Maxinchak and Augustus Düsberg. From 1893 to 1897, she was taught by Julius Blankensee in Nuremberg where her family moved after her mother married her second husband August Göllerich. Between 1897 and 1899, she attended the Hoch Conservatory in Frankfurt with Ivan Knorr and Fritz Bassermann teaching her in music theory and violin. In 1899, she moved to Berlin and continued her studies with Joseph Joachim and Andreas Moser at the Königliche Hochschule für Musik.

In 1903, she settled in Linz, where she was immediately awarded a gold medal at the First Upper Austrian Music Festival. She taught at the music school headed by her stepfather Göllerich. From 1908 to 1914, she lived and worked in Leipzig. In 1914, she began teaching in Berlin at the Ochs-Eichelberg Conservatory. In 1916, she moved to Munich, then from 1923 to 1925, she worked again in Linz as professor of music school and concertmaster of the local orchestra. In 1925, she returned to Munich.

She performed as a soloist with a repertoire ranging from J. S. Bach and J. von Bieber to Joseph Joachim. She was known as a promoter of Max Reger's music and performed with him (in particular, performing his Violin Concerto with the Berlin Philharmonic conducted by the composer in 1910). She also performed as part of the piano trio with Fritz von Bose and Robert Emile Hansen and later as part of another trio with Ella Jonas-Stockhausen and Eugenia Stolz. In 1938–1939, she was the first violin in the Pastorie string quartet.

Pálma von Pászthory reworked a number of keyboard compositions by Bach, Friederic Chopin and Tchaikovsky for violin or string quartet.
