= Andreas Moser =

German musician, music pedagogue and musicologist

Andreas Moser (29 November 1859 – 7 October 1925) was a German musician, music pedagogue and musicologist.

== Early life and education ==
Born in Zemun, Syrmia, Austrian Empire, Moser was the son of a winegrower and smoker from Upper Austria. As a child he received violin lessons and sang in the church choir. His high school singing teacher was Friedrich Hegar. From 1874, Moser attended the Zurich Kantonsschule. After graduating from high school, he first studied engineering at the Technical University of Zurich and architecture in Stuttgart. In addition to his studies, he gained further musical experience, among other things as first violinist of the "Zurich Student Quartet" and conductor of the Stuttgart Academic Singing Association. He finally turned his attention to music for good and in 1878 became a student of Joseph Joachim at the Berlin University of the Arts. The following year, Moser took up a post as assistant teacher there.

== Career ==
In 1883 he received his first position as concertmaster at the Nationaltheater Mannheim, but had to give it up after a few months for health reasons. He worked first as a private violin teacher and from 1888 as a lecturer at the Berlin Musikhochschule. In 1900 he was appointed full professor for violin there. Among his students were Pálma von Pászthory, Josef Wolfsthal, Robert Imandt, Richard Czerwonky, Hans Bassermann and Julius Ruthström. In 1925, the philosophical faculty of the University of Berlin awarded him an honorary doctorate.

Moser played as violist in the Joachim Quartet and led his own string quartet in the 1890s, which performed in Berlin. However, he suffered from a "nervous complaint of the arm" (E. van der Straeten), which prevented him from performing regularly, so he concentrated on teaching. In Berlin he became Joachim's most important assistant and wrote music-theoretical publications with him, especially the three-volume Violin School of 1905. He also published a biography of Joachim, edited a collection of letters between Brahms and Joachim and, after Joachim's death, published Methodik des Violinspiels (Leipzig, 1920) and Technik des Violinspiels (Leipzig, 1925) and was active as editor of violin literature with Edition Peters and the Universal Edition.

== Personal life ==
From 1888, Moser was married to Edda (1868-1930), daughter of the writer Rudolf Elcho. The marriage produced a son, the musicologist Hans Joachim Moser.

In 1925 Moser retired and moved to Heidelberg. He suffered from throat cancer and died the same year in Berlin aged 65 as a result of an operation.

== Publications ==
=== Writings ===
- with Joseph Joachim: Violinschule (1908–1910), 3 volumes, Simrock Verlag Berlin
- Methodik des Violinspiels. (1920) Breitkopf & Härtel, Leipzig
- Geschichte des Violinspiels. (1923), Max Hesses Verlag, Berlin; 2nd improved and supplemented edition with Hans-Joachim Nösselt, Schneider Verlag, Tutzing 1966/67 (in 2 volumes)
- Technik des Violinspiels (1925), Breitkopf & Härtel, Leipzig
- Utopiekonzept und Geschichtsauffassung im Werk Heiner Müllers.

=== Editorial activities notes ===
- Bach: Konzert für 2 Violinen, BWV 1043 (Peters, 1884).
- Beethoven: Streichquartett Op 59 No 1 (with Joachim) (Peters, 1902).
- Beethoven: Streichquartette, Op 127, 130, 131, 132, 133, 135 (with Joachim and Hugo Dechert) (Peters, 1901).
- Haydn: 30 Streichquartette (with Hugo Dechert) (Peters, date unknown).
- Mozart: 10 Streichquartette, KV 387, 421, 428, 458, 464, 465, 499, 576, 589, 590, (with Hugo Becker) (Peters, 1882).
- Schubert, Streichquartette, D 804, 810, 887, 703 (with Hugo Becker) (Peters, date unknown).

In addition to these editions, the concertos and other solo literature contained in the Joachim / Moser Violin, published by Simrock in 1905, include the Bach concertos BWV 1041 and 1043; the Beethoven Romances, Op 40 and 50; Brahms, Violin Concerto, Op 77; Handel, Sonata in A, HWV 361; Kreutzer, Violin Concerto No. 19: Mozart, Violin Concertos, K 218 and 219; Rode, Violin Concertos Nos 10 and 11; Spohr, Violin Concerto No 8; Tartini, "Teufelstriller" Sonata; Viotti, Concerto No 22
