= Wilhelm Stross =

German violinist and conductor

Wilhelm Stross (5 November 1907 – 18 January 1966) was a German violinist and composer. He was professor at the Hochschule für Musik und Theater München and the Hochschule für Musik und Tanz Köln as well as first violin of the Stross Quartet.

== Life ==
Born in Eitorf, Stross was son of the music director Carl Stross and his wife Auguste, née Killmeyer. He received piano and violin lessons at an early age and gave up a solo concert at the Garrison Hospital in Siegburg at the age of seven. At the age of ten he was accepted into the master class of Joseph Joachim's student Bram Eldering at the Cologne Conservatory. The conductor Hermann Abendroth was also one of his teachers. Five years later his father died, so that he had to find his own livelihood. He received a state exemption at the newly founded Hochschule für Musik Köln. Already in 1928 he won the renowned Mendelssohn Prize at the age of 22. In 1930 he passed his final examination with distinction

In the same year he went to Berlin, where he was concertmaster of Edwin Fischer's chamber orchestra and continued his studies with Carl Flesch. In 1932 he was appointed by the pianist Elly Ney together with the cellist Ludwig Hoelscher to the second Elly Ney Trio and celebrated international success with them.

In 1934 he was brought to the then Akademie der Tonkunst, now the Hochschule für Musik und Theater München, as successor to Felix Berber as Germany's youngest academy professor. Here, together with the cellist Anton Walter, the violist Valentin Härtl and with Anton Huber as second violinist, he repositioned the Stross Quartet, which soon established itself as one of the leading chamber music associations. In 1936 a duo connection with Claudio Arrau was for a short time, but this came to an end with the pianist's emigration to America. In 1941 Stross founded the chamber orchestra named after him. With it he renewed a baroque tradition: the ensemble played without baton conductors in a standing position and was led by Stross from the first desk. In 1943 he sought a connection to the wind section of the Vienna Philharmonic (the chamber music community lasted until 1962). With them he recorded the Beethoven Septet and the Schubert Octet among others. In 1944 Adolf Hitler included him in the so-called Gottbegnadeten list, which spared him and his quartet mates a war effort.

From 1951 to 1954 he taught as a professor at the Hochschule für Musik in Cologne. In 1954 he was again appointed professor at the Staatliche Hochschule für Musik in Munich. From there he toured with his quartet and chamber orchestra to many countries in Europe, the Near East and several times to Asia. In 1955 Stross accompanied Konrad Adenauer on his historic journey to the Soviet Union as the German "ambassador of music". The concerts in Moscow and Saint Petersburg met with an enthusiastic response and had to be repeated several times. The Stross Quartet helped shape the work of Franco-German reconciliation begun by Adenauer and Charles de Gaulle in his own way: Together with the French Loewenguth Quartet, they performed unusual programmes from 1957 onwards, forming "national-mixed" quartets, sextets and octets and giving guest performances in the major European cities. But his work as a violin teacher always remained central. Thus the Munich Musikhochschule became an internationally radiating "violinist's forge", which produced numerous concert masters and soloists, such as Yūko Shiokawa, Takaya Urakawa, Oscar Yatco and others. However, Stross was most effective as an educator as a mediator of a chamber music tradition that could refer to Joseph Joachim. Thus, in the 1960s, numerous quartet associations were founded with Stross students as primary school teachers (for example Heinz Endres, Erich Keller, Josef Märkl, Gerhardt Seitz, Ingo Sinnhoffer, Kurt-Christian Stier - all of whom later became concertmasters and/or professors at the Munich Musikhochschule).

Stross was married to Ruth Hasse (1913-2009), a daughter of the Reger student Martin Karl Hasse, and had three children with her. He died in Rottach-Egern aged 58 and is buried in the Lutheran cemetery at his last residence in Tegernsee.

== Discography– Vinyls / CDs ==
- Beethoven: Septet E flat major op. 20 for violin, viola, violoncello, horn, clarinet, bassoon, bass with Wilhelm Stross, v., Valentin Härtl, va. Rudolf Metzmacher, cl.; Vienna Philharmonic Wind Ensemble (Wlach, Freiberg, Öhlberger); Label: Elite
- Mozart: Quartet in G minor for piano, violin, viola, violoncello KV 478 H.E. Riebensam, piano + Stross-Quartet; Label: Elite
- Schubert: Octet F major op. 166 with the Stross quartett and wind ensemble of the Vienna Philharmonic; Label: Elite
- Mozart: Horn Quintet in E flat major KV 407 with the Stross Quartet and Gottfried Ritter von Freiberg, horn; + C. M. von Weber 'Gran Quintetto' for clarinet and string quartet op. 34 with Stross Quartet and Leopold Wlach, Cla.; Label: Elite
- Schubert: String Quintet D 956 + Reger String Quartet op. 121; Label Sound Star
