= Kurt-Christian Stier =

German classical violinist

Kurt-Christian Stier (3 February 1926 – 31 July 2016) was a German violinist and concertmaster.

== Life ==
Born in Gütersloh, Stier, son of a pianist and piano teacher, had his first violin lesson at the age of seven. He studied for two years at the Niedersächsische Musikschule Braunschweig and was already at the age of 16 years a substitute in symphony concerts, in opera and operetta performances at the Staatstheater Braunschweig.

After wartime service, he returned from US captivity with serious illness. He studied at the Hochschule für Musik Detmold, where he passed his Abitur and the supplementary pedagogical examination, and at the Hochschule für Musik und Tanz Köln with Willibald Roth, Max Strub and Wilhelm Stross among others.

From 1952 to 1961, he was second violinist in the Stross Quartet and on many concert tours at home and abroad. In 1954, he came to Munich and was active in the Richter-Orchestra and the Münchener Bach-Chor. In 1958, he joined the Bavarian State Orchestra, where he was 1st violinist and from 1960, concert master under the conduct of Josef Keilberth. In Richter's Münchener Bach-Chor he was First Concertmaster for 25 years and gave concerts worldwide He also accompanied numerous solo musicians. He was co-founder and first violinist of the Munich String Quartet.

Since 1966, he had a teaching position at the Hochschule für Musik und Theater München, which appointed him professor for violin in 1975. He was also Vice-President of the later Hochschule für Musik München.

Stier was a long-standing member of the board of the Munich Tonkünstlerverband and its first chairman from 1983 to 1997. He was also chairman of the regional committee until 2004 Jugend musiziert.
