= Felix Berber =

German classical violinist

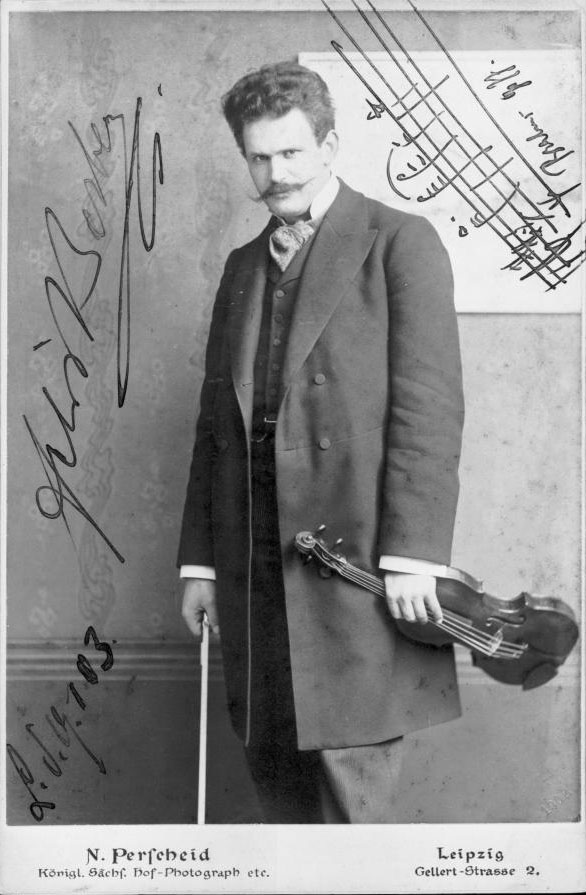
Felix Berber (c. 1903)

Karl Heinrich Felix Berber (11 March 1871 – 2 November 1930) was a German violinist.

== Life ==
Born in Jena, Berber was the youngest child of music and art-loving parents. He spent the first part of his childhood in Weimar, where the family moved soon after his birth. In Dresden, where his parents had moved again, he received violin lessons from the age of 7. Already at the age of nine, he made his first public appearance as a child prodigy in 1880. He was then a pupil at the Hochschule für Musik Carl Maria von Weber and with Adolph Brodsky at the University of Music and Theatre Leipzig. He gave his first major concerts at the age of 13. On the recommendation of Hans von Bülow, Berber concentrated solely on music after the death of his father. In 1889 he studied in London.

From 1891 to 1896, Berber was concertmaster in Magdeburg, but then went on concert tours through Europe in 1896 and 1897, and also gave guest performances in Russia. In 1897 and 1898, he worked in Chemnitz and from 1898 until 1903 he was first concertmaster of the Gewandhausorchester in Leipzig under the direction of Arthur Nikisch.

In 1904, he was appointed for the first time as a teacher for violin at the Hochschule für Musik und Theater München. In 1907, he succeeded Hugo Heermann at the Hoch Conservatory in Frankfurt, where he founded his "Museumsquartett". In 1908, he finally went to the Conservatoire de musique de Genève as successor of Henri Marteau.

After a concert tour through the US, Berber returned to the Munich Musikhochschule in 1913. His teaching activities were interrupted by the First World War, in which he participated as an active officer. Together with his academy colleagues Valentin Härtl (alto), Johannes Hegar (violoncello) and Anton Huber (violin), he formed the Berber Quartet in Munich in 1917. In 1920, he was appointed full professor at the Munich Academy of Music.

In his musical work, Berber combined the qualities of a virtuoso soloist with the skills of a disciplined chamber musicians, and he was also an ideal teacher. He played together with Johannes Brahms and was a pioneer for Max Reger and Hans Pfitzner. On 25 September 1918, he gave the world premiere of his Sonata in E Minor (op. 27) with Pfitzner himself at the founding event of the "Hans-Pfitzner-Verein".

Berber was married to the cabaret artist and chanson singer Lucie Thiem. Their daughter was the dancer and actress Anita Berber.

He died in Munich.
