= Kim Märkl =

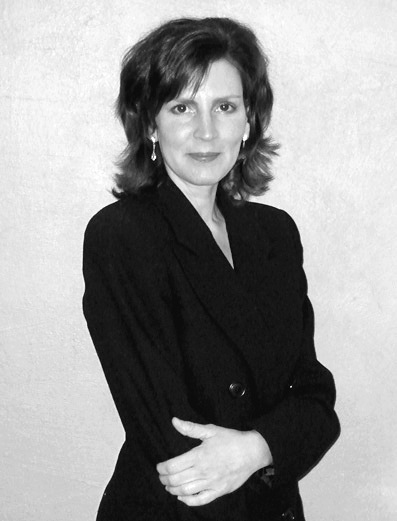

Background information
- Occupations: composer and musician
- Instrument: clarinet

Kim Märkl (born July 22, 1961) is an American composer, writer and clarinetist.

== Biography ==
Born in Cleveland, Ohio she began her musical training with Angelo Fortini. He as well as her father, who is a drummer and devoted to jazz, considerably influenced her early musical life. She received her B.M. in clarinet from Indiana University and her M.M. from Northwestern University, where she studied with Robert Marcellus. A year of lessons with Larry Combs also had a profound impact on her musical development. In 1985 she received a Fulbright Grant to study in Germany, where she obtained an Artist Diploma from the Freiburg Conservatory.

For many years she was active as a chamber musician, soloist, orchestral player and teacher. She has performed in the Spoleto, Tanglewood and Aspen Music Festivals, as well as in orchestras in Germany and Switzerland. In 2002 she and her husband Key-Thomas Märkl, a violinist in the Bavarian Radio Orchestra, established the Atlantic Crossing Recording Studio where she works as a producer, composer and author. Her passion lies in the combination of stories and music. Her works have been performed in concert halls throughout Germany and released by publishers in Germany, Switzerland and the U.S. Renowned actors and performers have recorded and performed her pieces including: Sky du Mont (Eyes Wide Shut), Hélène Grimaud, Ingolf Turban, Christian Tramitz, Sunnyi Melles, Steven Isserlis, Alex Dorow, and August Zirner.

Her CD Production The Ring of the Nibelung (Zimmermann Frankfurt) won the coveted Leopold Prize.

== Writings ==
- Love, Theft and Woodworms; Confessions of a Violin Dealer Play for an actor and a violinist
- The Violinist for narrator, violin and piano
- Stations for narrator, clarinet and string quartet
- Sea Poem – Ballet
- Stringsong for violin and piano
- Street Scene for clarinet and drums

== Books ==
- The Secret Box, was released as an illustrated book and CD, Zimmermann Verlag Frankfurt
- Land of the Midnight Sun, was released as an illustrated book and CD, Zimmermann Verlag Frankfurt
- The Snake Charmer, was released as an illustrated book and CD by Bohem Press

== Discography (selection) ==
- Stradivaris Gift for narrator, violin and string orchestra.
- The Snake Charmer for narrator, clarinet, guitar and tabla.
- A Dream Of Jazz for narrator and jazz quartet.
