= Markle, East Lothian =

Coordinates: 55°59′31″N 2°41′05″W

Markle is a hamlet in East Lothian, Scotland, 23 miles (37 km) East of Edinburgh and close to the village of East Linton. It is the site of the former Markle Castle.
