= Casimir von Pászthory =

Austrian composer

- Born: April 1, 1886; Budapest, Austria-Hungary
- Died: February 18, 1966 (aged 79) Wermelskirchen, Germany
- Occupations: Composer, cellist, conductor
- Years active: 1910s–1960s
- Spouse: Dora Baubin (m. 1911)
- Awards: Title of Professor (Austria, 1953)

Casimir von Pászthory (1 April 1886 – 18 February 1966) was an Austrian composer. His music, which is stylistically rooted in the Wagner-Strauss tradition, without renouncing elements of his own style, has largely fallen into oblivion today. It experienced at least a partial renaissance in 2004 with a revival of the opera Tilman Riemenschneider on the occasion of the 1300th anniversary of the city of Würzburg.

== Life ==
Born in Budapest, Pászthory was the son of a senior government official of the Royal Curia, who came from an old Hungarian family. His mother was the pianist Gisela von Voigt, who came from a German noble family with origins in Hanover. As a former pupil of Franz Liszt, she was active until her old age and at the age of 84 she played one of the master's piano concertos on his grand piano at a Liszt celebration in Budapest.

After his mother's second marriage to August Göllerich, Pászthory came to Nuremberg where he attended the Gymnasium. He then studied at the Law Faculty in Vienna, but concentrated mainly on his music studies, especially cello lessons with Paul Grümmer. After extensive travels, which took him all over Europe and as far as Asia Minor, he settled in Vienna, where he worked for many years as a teacher of cello at the Conservatory. In addition, he took part in the musical life of his time, among other things, as accompanist for his songs on the piano and as conductor of his orchestral works.

His partner Dora Baubin, whom he had married in 1911, participated intensively in his artistic work and wrote the textbooks for the stage works Die Prinzessin und der Schweinehirt and Tilman Riemenschneider.

Pászthory was a member of the NSDAP. When Pászthory lost his home and belongings in Vienna as a result of the war events of 1945, he moved to Salzburg in 1950 after a long stay at Attersee, where he was mainly occupied with composition. In 1953 he was awarded the title of professor by the Austrian president. For his eightieth birthday, the award of the Golden Ring of Honour of the City of Salzburg was planned, but could no longer take place. He spent the last days of his life in Wermelskirchen where he died aged 79.

== Work ==
=== Stage works ===
==== Operas ====
- Die drei gerechten Kammacher. Musikalische Komödie in zwei Akten (drei Bildern). Text nach der Erzählung von Gottfried Keller von Dora von Paszthory. Uraufgeführt an der Städtischen Oper Graz (6. Februar 1932).
- Die Prinzessin und der Schweinehirt. Märchenoper in drei Akten (acht Bildern). Text, frei nach Hans Christian Andersen, von Dora von Paszthory. – Wien: Universal-Edition 1939. Uraufgeführt am Nationaltheater Weimar 1937. Weitere Aufführungen am Salzburger Landestheater 1955/56.
- Tilman Riemenschneider. Oper in zwei Teilen (acht Bildern). Text von Dora von Paszthory (1942). Uraufgeführt im Theater Basel 1959. Eine gekürzte Fassung (ORF) liegt vor.
- Eine Weihnachtsmusik zu Ludwig Thomas Weihnachtslegende "Heilige Nacht" für kleines Orchester, gemischten Chor, Soli und einen Sprecher (1944–48). Uraufgeführt im ORF, Landesstudio Oberösterreich.

==== Ballets ====
- Arvalany. Tanzspiel in fünf Bildern. Buch von Elza von Dohnanyi-Galafres. Uraufgeführt an der Dresdner Staatsoper (7 December 1939). Weitere Aufführungen in Weimar und Chemnitz (1941).
- Der Erlenhügel. Phantastisches Ballett nach dem Märchen von Hans Christian Andersen. Uraufgeführt am Badisches Staatstheater Karlsruhe 1936.
- Isbrand und Isigildis. Tanzlegende aus dem frühen Mittelalter. Uraufgeführt am Nationaltheater Weimar 1938.

==== Melodramas ====
- Was der Friedel in der Weihnacht. Textdichter unbekannt.
- Die Weise von Liebe und Tod des Cornets Christoph Rilke, op. 1. Text von R. M. Rilke (1914). Wurde auch ins Französische übersetzt und erlebte zahlreiche Aufführungen.
- Die wilden Schwäne. Text by H. Ch. Andersen (1937).

=== Songs ===
==== Orchestra Songs ====
- Gebet des geschienten Ritters im Felde (0. J. Bierbaum)
- Gütige Mutter Erde. 6 besinnliche Lieder nach verschiedenen Texten für Bariton (Alt) und Orchester (1963). - Klavierfassung: Wermelskirchen: Eva Molineus-von Paszthory 1972.

1. Gütige Mutter Erde (altgriechische Grabinschrift) - 2. Ob unser Tod denn gemäß (R. R. Källenberger) - 3. Psalm - 4. November (Weinheber) - 5. Stufen (Hesse) - 6. Die Blätter fallen (Rilke)

- Das Jahr. 12 Gesänge nach Gedichten von J. Weinheber für mittlere Stimme und großes Orchester (1936–1937)

1. Jänner - 2. Februar - 3. März - 4. April- 5. Mai - 6. Juni - 7. Juli - 8. August - 9. September - 10. Oktober - 11. November - 12. Dezember

- 5 Lieder im Volkston nach verschiedenen Texten für mittlere Stimme und Kammerorchester. - Braunschweig: Litolff 1936; Wermelskirchen: Eva Molineus-von Paszthory 1972

1. Im Volkston (Storm) - 2. Volkslied aus der Stauferzeit - 3. Wiegenlied im Freien (Des Knaben Wunderhorn) - 4. Der Maie, der Maie (14. Jahrhundert) - 5. Morgen muß ich fort von hier

- Sabine (Chansons d'automne). 7 chansons pour voix moyenne d'apres des textes de Paul Verlaine avec accompagnement d'orchestre ou de piano. Ins Deutsche übertragen von Dora von Paszthory (1928–1929). Uraufgeführt im Wiener Rundfunk 1933. - Wermelskirchen: Eva Molineus-von Paszthory 1972

1. Verschollene Weise (Ariette oubliee) - 2. Herbstlied (Chanson d'automne) - 3. Psalm (Psaume) - 4. Serenade - 5. Komm, laß uns tanzen (Dansons la gigue!) - 6. Lebwohl (Adieu) - 7. Das Meer (La mer)

==== Piano Songs ====
===== Cycles =====
- Advent-Lieder. 2 Lieder nach Texten von Arthur Fischer-Colbrie. - Wermelskirchen: Eva Molineus-von Paszthory

1. Waldadvent (1942) - 2. Deutscher Weihnachtswald (1951)

- 6 Altdeutsche Minnelieder

1. Gar hoch auf jenem Berg allein (Des Knaben Wunderhorn) - 2. Unter den Linden (W. von der Vogelweide) - 3. Wie ich da ruhte! (W. von der Vogelweide) - 4. Dieser Stern im Dunkel (Der von Kürenberg) - 5. Nur Eine kann mir Freude geben (um 1100) - 6. Volkslied (um 1200)

- Hände. Ein Liederzyklus nach Gedichten von Rilke, Storm, Hesse, Dora von Paszthory, Martha Hälscher und Bierbaum für Bariton und Klavier

1. Du! Hände - 2. Im Volkston .- 3. Wenn sich die kleine Kinderhand 4. Bitte - 5. Schließe mir die Augen beide - 6. Als du heut' meine Hand (1939) - 7. Ehemarterl

- Japanische Legende. 13 Lieder nach Gedichten japanischer und chinesischer Dichter (nachgedichtet von Klabund und Hans Bethge) für eine Frauen- und eine Männerstimme

1. Der duftende Armel- 2. Am Ufer - 3. Vertrauen (1960) - 4. Uber die Heide (1960) - 5. Bitte an die Götter - 6. Vereinigung - 7. Abschied 8. Der müde Soldat - 9. Die Verlassene (1924) - 10. In der Fremde 11. Noch einmal - 12. Beschränkung - 13. Dauer im Wechsel

- 6 Lieder nach Gedichten von Hesse für hohe oder mittlere Stimme und Klavier. - Braunschweig: Litolff 1936; Frankfurt: LitolffjPeters 1972

1. Sei nicht traurig - 2. Der Brief - 3. Bitte - 4. Landstreicherherberge 5. Im Nebel- 6. Meine fröhliche Liebe

- 6 Lieder aus "Des Knaben Wunderhorn"

1. Mein Schätzle ist fein - 2. Der Butzemann - 3. Abzählvers - 4. Die schwarze Amsel - 5. Aus einem Kindermärchen (Königstochter, jüngste) 6. Die Magd an der Wiege

- 8 Lieder nach Texten von Rilke. - Wermelskirchen, Frankfurt: LitolffjPeters 1972

1. Advent - 2. Du! Hände - 3. Um die vielen Madonnen (1928) - 4. Pieta (1928) - 5. Ein Frauenschicksal (1928) - 6. Der Gefangene - 7. Du willst Dir einen Pagen küren - 8. Du, meine heilige Einsamkeit (1927)

- 4 Lieder nach Gedichten von Storm

1. Elisabeth - 2. Schließe mir die Augen beide - 3. Nelken (1944) - 4. Im Volkston (1936)

===== Songs alone =====
- Der Brief (Hesse, 1932)
- Christiane (Hermann Claudius, 1951)
- Der Fuji-Yama
- Großstadtkinder (Karl Borromäus Frank, 1955)
- Ich armer Tropf (Terange. Aus dem Japanischen übertragen von H. Bethge)
- Ich hört ein Sichelin rauschen
- Lächeln (Grete Körber)
- Lied zweier Alten (Hermann Claudius, 1940)
- Meine fröhliche Liebe (Hesse, 1934)
- Meine Prinzessin ist maiwärts gangen (Freiherr von Appel)
- Sehnsucht (Ricada Huch, 1950)
- Sei nicht traurig (Hesse)
- Urlicht (Des Knaben Wunderhorn)
- Vorfrühling (Bierbaum, 1937)

=== Instrumental music ===
==== Orchestra ====
- Thijl Uilenspiegel. Eines Volkes Knechtschaft und Befreiung.Symphonic poem after the novel by Charles de Coster for large orchestra (1933). First performed in Munich.

==== Chamber music ====
- Quartet for 2 violins, viola and cello, op. 25 (1951). First performed at ORF, Vienna.
- Piano trio. First performed in Linz.
- Sonata for violoncello and piano, op. 13 - Wermelskirchen, Frankfurt: Litolff/Peters 1936. First performed at the International Music Festival in Frankfurt with Ludwig Hoelscher).
