= Key-Thomas Märkl =

German-Japanese violinist and music educator

Key-Thomas Märkl (born May 19, 1963) is a German-Japanese violinist and music educator.

== Biography ==
Märkl began learning the violin at the age of five with his father, Josef Märkl. His brother Jun Märkl is a noted conductor. Among his solo recordings are Stradivaris Gift (Monarda), The Secret Box (Zimmermann Frankfurt) Stringsong (Latham Music). He is married to the writer, composer and producer Kim Märkl.

== Pedagogue ==
Key Märkl is currently holding the position of Assistant to Ingolf Turban at the Conservatory for Music in Munich, as well as giving Master Classes in Japan.
