= Markle Castle =

Ruined 14th-century castle near Markle, Scotland

Coordinates: 55.9889°N 2.6755°W

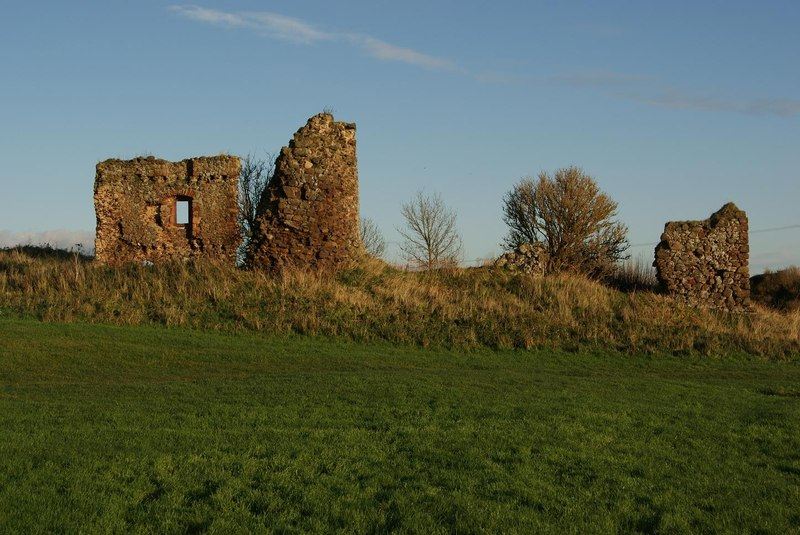
Ruins of Markle Castle

Markle Castle, or Markle is a ruined 14th-century castle, about 0.5 miles (0.8 km) near the hamlet of Markle, north west of East Linton, East Lothian, Scotland, near the East Coast Main Line.

== History ==
Óengus II is reputed to have rested his army in this area before the battle in 832 at which the Cross of St Andrew was said to have appeared.

Markle was built by the Hepburns. Its ownership was closely associated with Hailes Castle, which is nearby.

The English burnt Markle in 1401 and 1544. In the first attack in 1401, Henry Percy (Hotspur) was colluding with George de Dunbar, 11th Earl of Dunbar & March. The second attack was during the Rough Wooing, when the English were led by Lord Hertford. Markle was burnt on the morning of 17 May 1544 by the English army, after they had set fires in Leith and Edinburgh. On the same day, Haddington, Stenton, "Bentestoun" (Stevenson), and Prestonpans were burnt.

By 1588, Markle was shown as a Clan Stewart property in the Register of the Great Seal of Scotland; the last reference to it in the register is for 1635.

Markle was in the possession of the rebel earl Francis Stewart, 5th Earl of Bothwell, and in September 1594 James VI gave Hailes Castle, Morham, Traprain, and Markle to Walter Scott of Buccleuch.

In November 1600, Robert Hepburn was resident at the "Place of Markle" when his kinsmen abducted Margaret Carkettle from Monkrigg (near Lennoxlove) and brought her to Markle, treating her in "abominable and destable form".

== Structure ==
A few fragments of the walls of Markle remain on a rocky mound. The remains of the 14th century tower house forms a courtyard with the 16th-century hall. There was once a fortified ditch. There were monastic buildings of which no traces remain.

== See also ==
- Castles in Great Britain and Ireland
- List of castles in Scotland
