= Pierre Émile Metzmacher =

French painter

- Born: 11 October 1842; Belleville, France
- Died: 22 October 1916 (aged 74); Samois-sur-Seine, France
- Known for: Painter

Pierre Émile Metzmacher (11 October 1842 in Belleville – 22 October 1916 in Samois-sur-Seine was a French painter.

== Biography ==
Pierre Émile Metzmacher was the son of the engraver Pierre Guillaume Metzmacher (1815-1876) and Émilie Marie Jeanne Duperrier (1814-1860).

He exhibited at the Salon from 1863 and obtained an honorable mention in 1879 and 1889

In 1865, he married Mathilde Julia Hewitt. The painters Gustave Boulanger and Florent Willems are witnesses to their union.

He died at his home in Samois-sur-Seine on 22 October 1916.

== Works ==
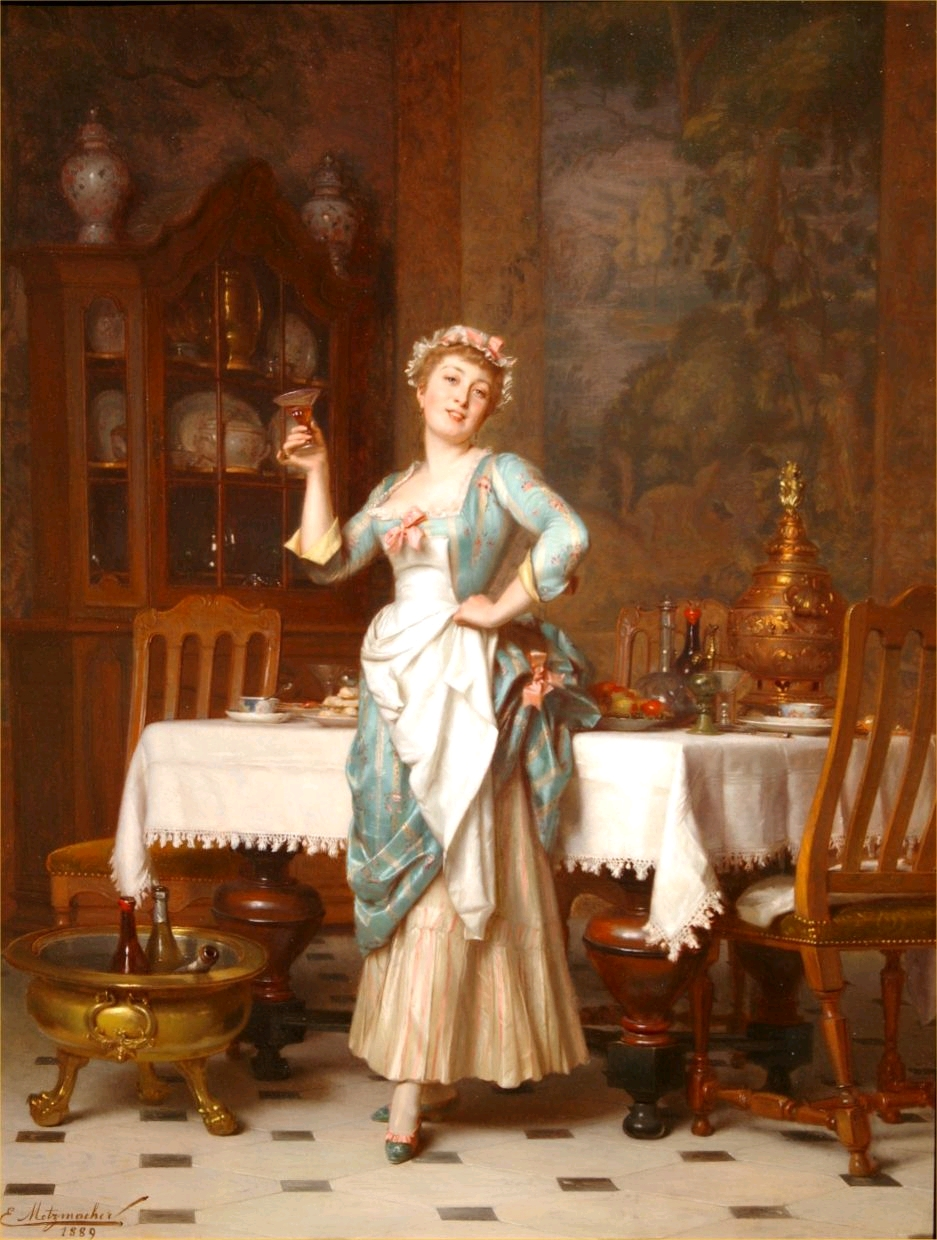
An Elegant Maid, 1889

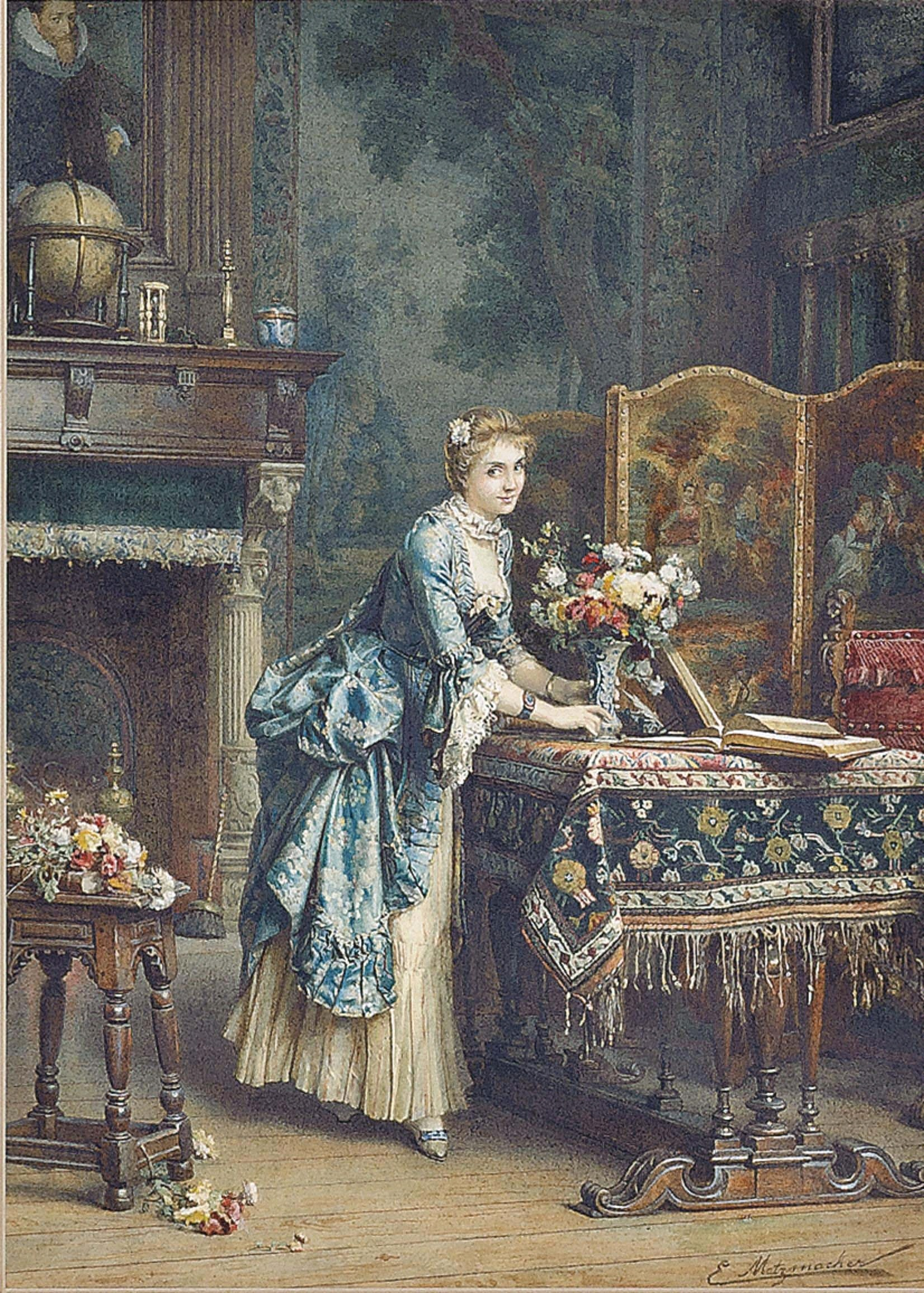
Arranging Flowers

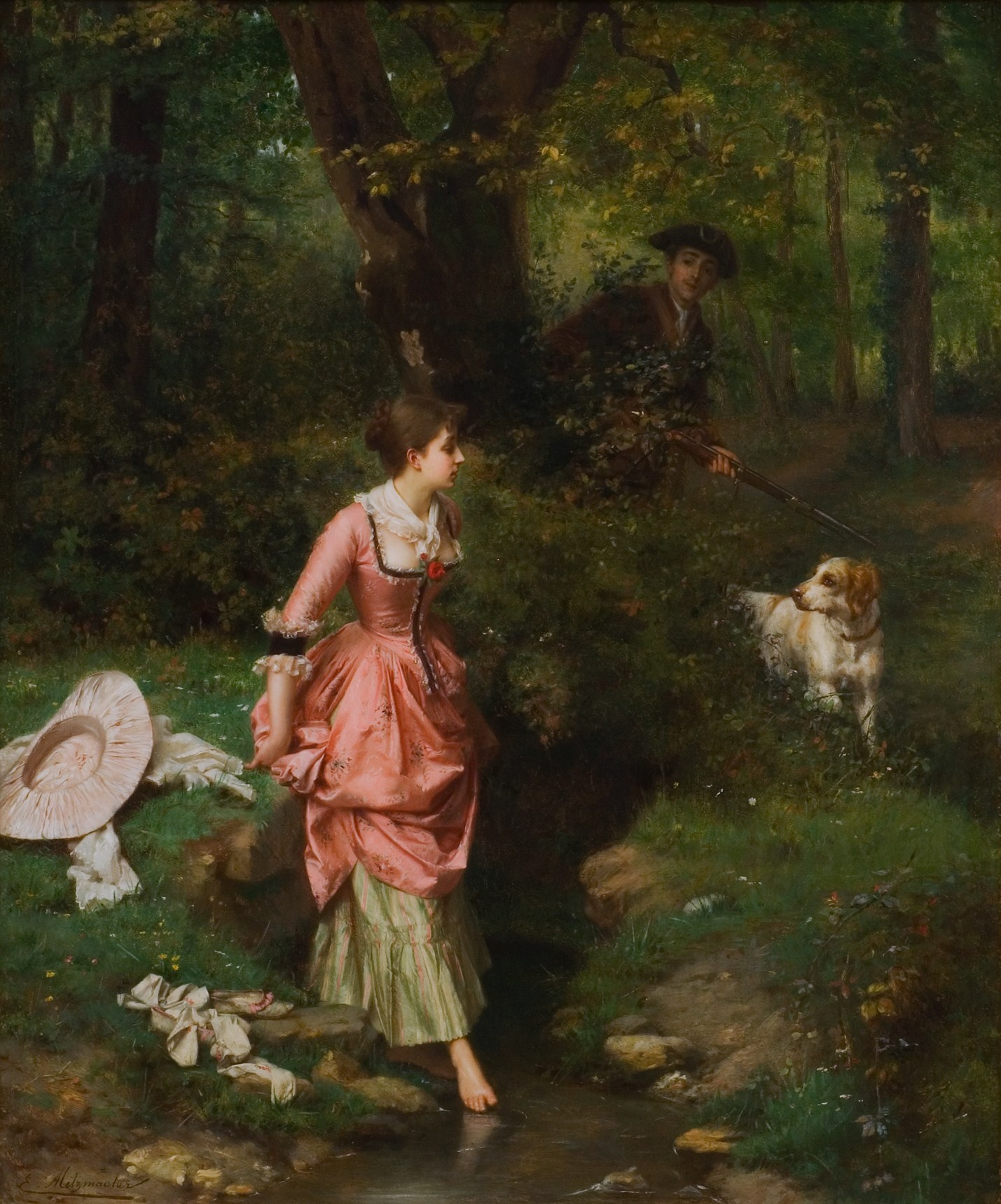
A Young Lady Crossing a Brook

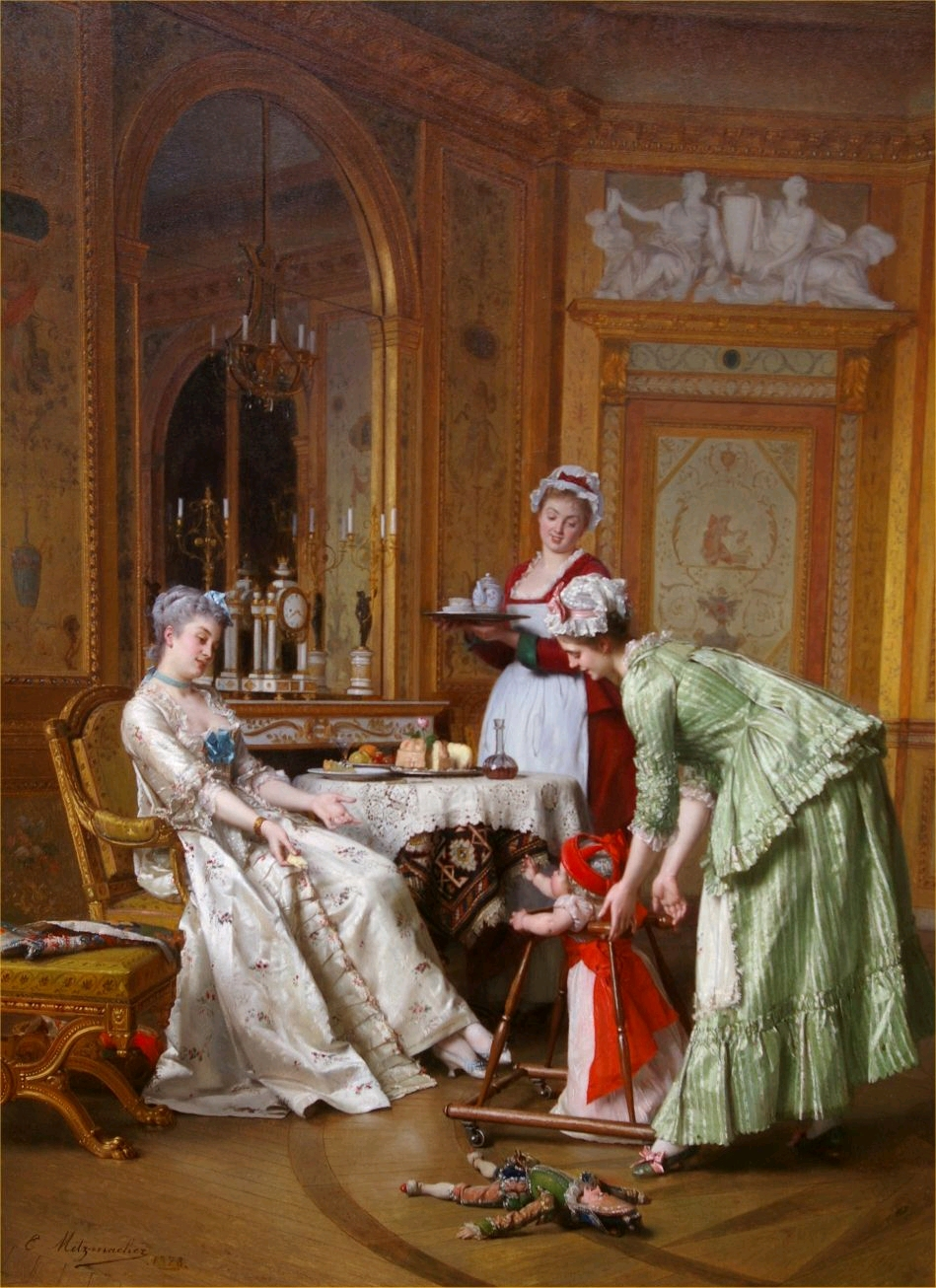
Baby’s First Steps, 1878

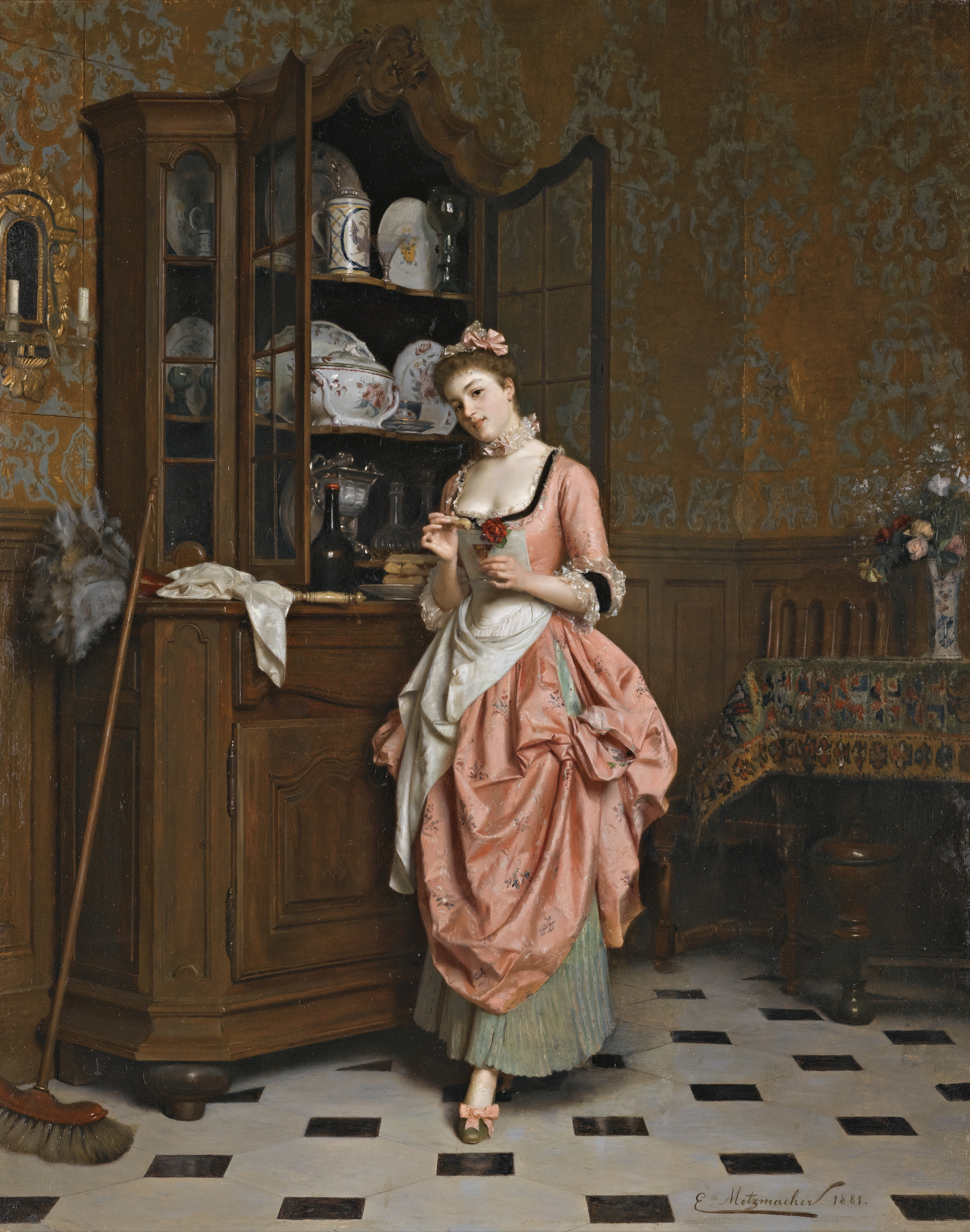
The Aperitif, 1881
