= Hermann Unger =

German composer

Gustav Hermann Unger (26 October 1886 – 31 December 1958) was a German composer.

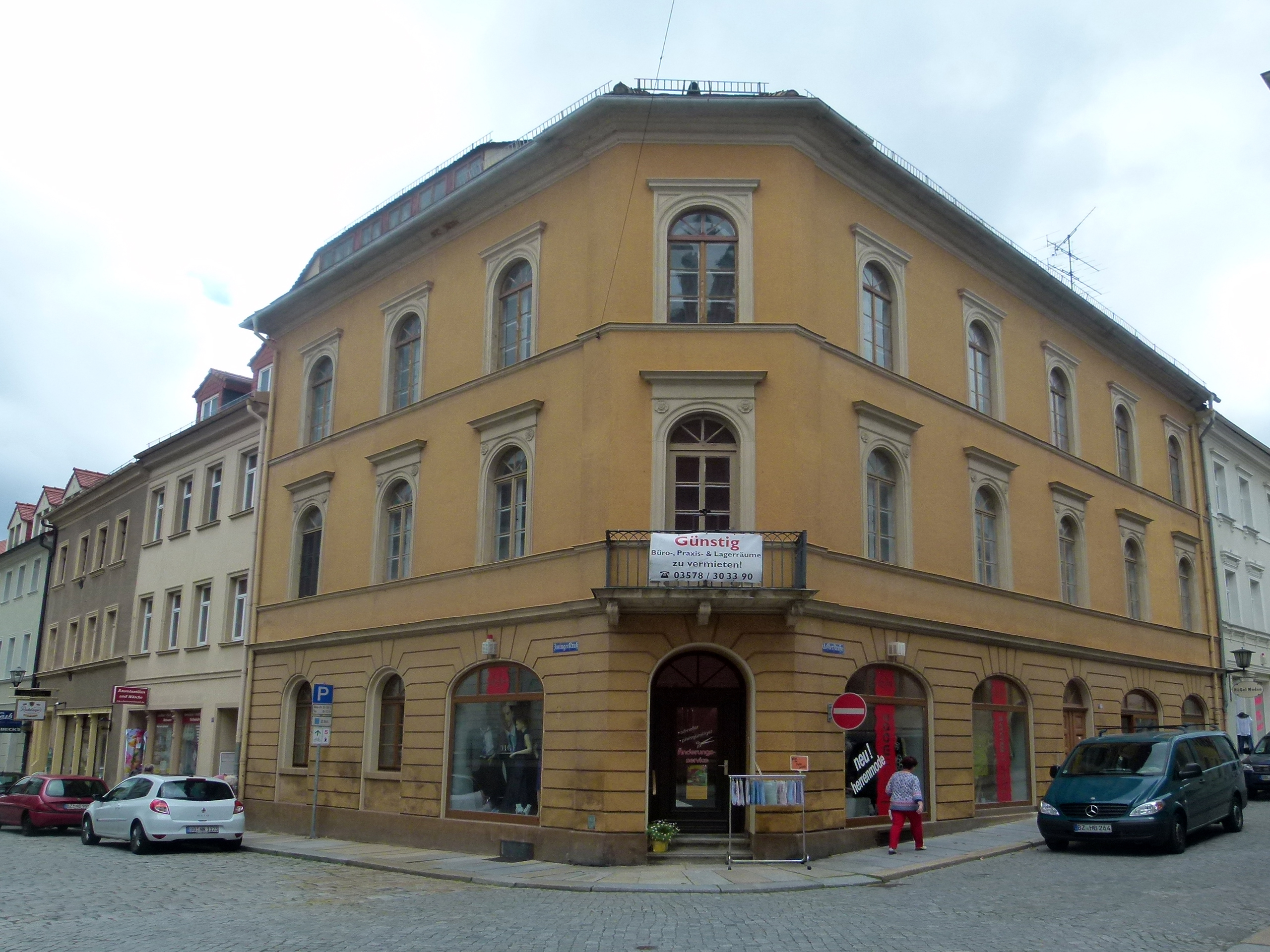
Hermann Ungers birthplace in Klosterstraße 1 in Kamenz

== Life ==
Born in Kamenz, Unger was the son of the travelling theatre director Fritz Unger (1858-1922) and his wife Maria née Stein. Unger attended the Gymnasium St. Augustine and studied German, archaeology, musicology and classical philology at the universities of Freiburg, Leipzig and Munich . During his studies in Munich, He was musically educated by Edgar Istel and Joseph Haas. The latter sent him in 1911 to Max Reger to the Meiningen Court Orchestra. Unger did his military service in Meiningen with the Regimentsmusik. In 1910, he received his doctorate from Otto Crusius in Munich with a thesis on the use of the dactylic hexameter in the ancient Greek comedy. Borna-Leipzig 1911.

In 1913 Unger came to Cologne as editor of the Rheinische Musik- und Theater-Zeitung. During World War I, he first came to Champagne. After that, Unger was transferred to the theatres of war of the Ottoman Empire and served in Aleppo and Constantinople. After returning via Russia in 1918/1919, he directed the Cologne Public Library and gave lectures at the University of Cologne. In 1919 Unger married the widow of the staff doctor Alexander Burger, Leonie née Debüser (1894-1970). From the marriage the son Klaus (1920-2012) was born.

From 1927 Unger was professor at the Rheinische Musikschule in Cologne, which, since the reformation in 1925, had been transformed into a state college of music (master classes for instrumental playing and singing, composition, music theory, music history, rhythmics, opera school, and the departments for Protestant and Catholic church music and school music) and the municipal Rheinische Musikschule (preparatory classes for the orchestra school, the opera choir school and classes for lay and youth music) with separate statutes and examination regulations. After the National Socialists seized power, the director of the university Walter Braunfels was dismissed. The director of the music school Hermann Abendroth was also expelled from his office a year later. In 1935 Martin Karl Hasse took over the management of the university. Unger was appointed director of the Rheinische Musikschule and Hasse's deputy.

Although Unger was still a journalist polemicising against the accumulation of offices and mismanagement in Cologne before 1933, he accepted 16 offices close to the system after the seizure of power. In January 1949, the denazification main committee of the City of Cologne classified Unger in category IV (hanger-on) without blocking accounts and assets. Nevertheless, there were numerous public events on Unger's seventieth birthday. Even his native town of Kamenz, then part of the Eastern Bloc, organized a festive concert in 1956 in the Gaststätte Stadt Dresden, as it had done before in 1936, under the musical direction of the Kamenz music director Höhne. Among the works performed were Niederrheinische Tänze und Lieder (Op. 100) and Schönsteiner Schlossmusik (Suite in five movements after medieval tunes; Op. 105), both composed for chamber orchestra. The necessary sheet music and documents were sent personally to Kamenz by Unger, who was delighted with the honour.

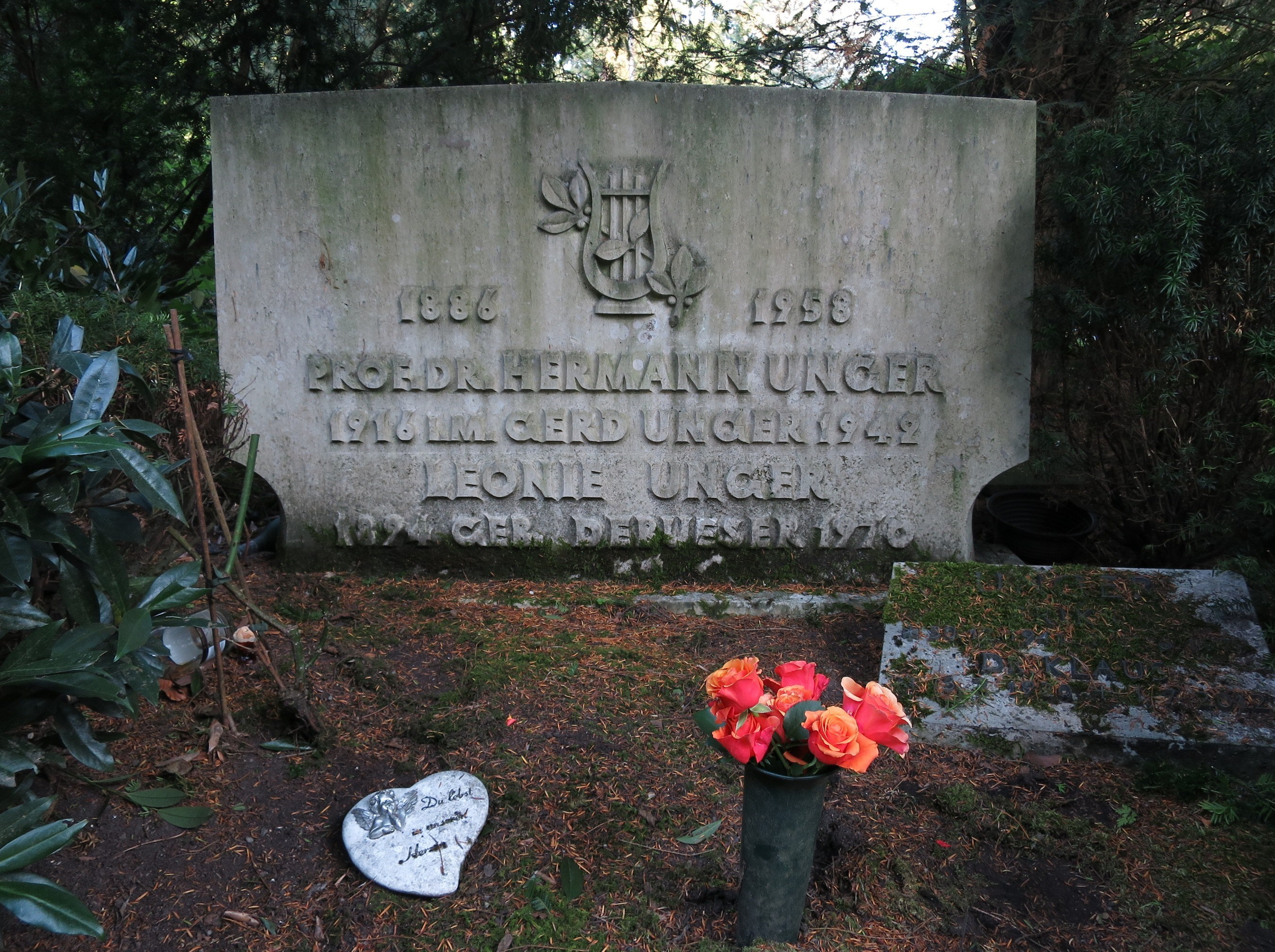
Hunger's family grave

The Deutscher Tonkünstlerverband suggested several times that Unger be awarded the Order of Merit of the Federal Republic of Germany first class, first about a month before Unger's seventieth birthday. The Nordrhein-Westfalen's Ministry of Culture rejected this on several occasions. Only after a letter addressed directly to the Minister of Culture Paul Luchtenberg at the end of 1957 did the latter decide to confer the order, which, however, only took place shortly before Unger's death by Luchtenberg's predecessor and successor Werner Schütz on "December 5, 1958 at about 7:00 p.m." in Unger's apartment without informing the press. In January 1959, Schütz had to comment in detail on the circumstances of the awarding of the Order.

On 31 December 1958 Unger died at the age of 72 in his apartment in Cologne-Bayenthal. The burial place of the Unger family is located in the Cologne Südfriedhof. (corridor 43).

== Honours ==
- Eisernes Kreuz II. und I. Klasse.
- Eiserner Halbmond.
- Hanseatenkreuz.
- Bundesverdienstkreuz 1. Klasse

== Work ==
- Bilder aus dem Orient: op. 17
- Levantinisches Rondo: op. 22
- Hymnus an das Leben: op. 25 (text Émile Verhaeren)
- Jahreszeiten: op. 26 (First performance in Berlin and Leipzig by Arthur Nikisch)
- Richmodis von Aducht: op. 50, Legendary folk opera in one prelude and three acts
- Kleine Fuge (Study of thirds and sixths) op. 129
