= Valentin Härtl =

German violist and violinist

Valentin Georg Härtl (20 June 1894 – 13 August 1966) was a German violist and violinist.

== Life ==
Born in Aschaffenburg, Härtl was the son of a train driver, August Härtl and Elisabeth Härtl, geb. After his Abitur at the humanistic grammar school in Aschaffenburg, Härtl studied at the Hoch Conservatory in Frankfurt from 1910 to 1912 with Adolf Rebner, together with Paul Hindemith, with whom he had a lifelong friendship. 1913/1914 he was a pupil of the master class by professor Felix Berber at the Hochschule für Musik und Theater München in Munich.

After the First World War, he went back to Aschaffenburg in 1918 as a violin teacher. From 1919 until his death he taught, from 1925 as a professor, at the academy of music, the later academy of music and theatre in Munich.

Härtl was a member of many important chamber music ensembles: together with his academy colleagues Johannes Hegar (violoncello), Anton Huber (violin) and his former teacher Felix Berber (violin) in his Berber Quartet, the "Munich Viola Quintet, the "H-Trios" (H'uber-Härtl-Hindemith) and the Stross Quartet. A member of Karl Richter's "Bach Orchestra", for decades, he was regarded as an indispensable "institution" in Munich concert life.

In October 1941 he married in Munich the 13 years younger Elisabeth von Brasch, daughter of the bank director Arved von Brasch and his first wife Alice Bircher, but was divorced from her already in 1946. On 7 December 1946 he married Ruth Blatter also in Munich and had two children, Cornelia and Wolfgang.

Härtl died in 1966 during a holiday in Italy at the age of 68.
