= Martin Karl Hasse =

German university lecturer, composer and music writer

Martin Karl Woldemar Hasse (20 March 1883 – 31 July 1960) was a German university lecturer, composer and music writer.

== Life ==
Born in Dohna, Hasse was the son of the pastor Martin Hasse (1852-1915) and his wife Cora († 1922), née Wittich. In 1910 in Heidelberg, he married Aline (1881-1936), a daughter of Adolf Schmitthenner (1854-1907), pastor and writer. Together with his wife he had three daughters. Of these is known by name: Ruth Hasse (1913-2009), violinist, married to Wilhelm Stross (1907-1966), professor at the Munich Academy of Music.

Hasse received his first musical instruction as Thomaner-Alumni in Leipzig. This was followed by practical musical training at the Leipzig Conservatory with Stephan Krehl, Adolf Ruthardt, Karl Straube and Arthur Nikisch. On Karl Straube's recommendation, he continued his studies at the Hochschule für Musik und Theater München with Max Reger and Felix Mottl; at the university there he listened to musicology with Hermann Kretzschmar and Hugo Riemann as well as lectures on history, philosophy and German studies.

After a temporary activity as assistant to Philipp Wolfrum in Heidelberg and in Chemnitz as cantor, he became municipal music director in Bielefeld in 1910; in 1919, on his initiative, the Institut für Musik der Hochschule Osnabrück was opened.

In 1919 he was appointed university music director and professor at the Eberhard Karls Universität Tübingen, where he founded the music institute and the musicological seminar. In 1923 he received his doctorate in musicology and in 1935 he became director of the Hochschule für Musik und Tanz Köln, his representative was Hermann Unger; Hasse held this office until his retirement in 1945. After his retirement he devoted himself to compositional work.

Hasse died in Cologne at the age of 77.

== Activity ==
Hasse became known as a composer, conductor, educator, organizer and music writer. He has appeared in public with numerous symphonic compositions, suites, concertos, choral works, cantatas, songs, and piano and organ works. Following Max Reger's training, he almost always strived for a strict polyphony structure of the composition, which would result in a self-contained and uniform work of art. He was also instrumental in the German organ movement that began in the 1920s and led to the reconstruction of numerous old instruments.

As a music writer he wrote books about Johann Sebastian Bach and Max Reger and published numerous essays on questions of style and daily problems of music culture.

== Memberships ==
- Hasse joined the Kampfbund für deutsche Kultur in 1932 and the National Socialist German Workers' Party in 1937. He also belonged to the National Socialist Teachers League.
- He took part in the Musicological Conference in Düsseldorf on 26 May 1938 and, with Joseph Goebbels participating, gave a lecture on The great masters of music and the German people.

== Work ==
=== Writings ===
- Vom deutschen Musikleben. Zur Neugestaltung unseres Musiklebens in Deutschland, ausgewählte Aufsätze. Gustav Bosse Verlag, Regensburg 1933.
- Max Reger. Mensch und Werk. Botze, Berlin 1938.
- Veröffentlichungen ... Herausgegeben von ... Karl Hasse.

=== Compositions ===
- Variationen für zwei Klaviere. J. Rieter-Biedermann, Leipzig 1908.
- Drei Fantasien und Fugen für Orgel. J. Rieter-Biedermann, Leipzig 1909.

=== Publication / Editing ===
- Johann Hermann Schein; Martin Karl Woldemar Hasse: Ach Gott, vom Himmel sieh darein. Breitkopf und Härtel, 1923.
- Johann Hermann Schein; Martin Karl Woldemar Hasse: A Domino factum est istud. Breitkopf und Härtel, 1923.
- Johann Hermann Schein; Martin Karl Woldemar Hasse: Alleluia: Ich danke dem Herren. Breitkopf und Härtel, 1923.
- Johann Hermann Schein; Martin Karl Woldemar Hasse: Alleluia: Wohl dem, der den Herren fürchtet. Breitkopf und Härtel, 1923.
- Johann Hermann Schein; Martin Karl Woldemar Hasse: An Wasserflüssen Babylon. Breitkopf und Härtel, 1923.
- Johann Hermann Schein; Martin Karl Woldemar Hasse: Aus tiefer Not schrei ich zu dir. Breitkopf und Härtel, 1923.
- Johann Hermann Schein; Martin Karl Woldemar Hasse: Benedicam Domino. Breitkopf und Härtel, 1923.
- Johann Hermann Schein; Martin Karl Woldemar Hasse: Christe, der du bist Tag und Licht. Breitkopf und Härtel, 1923.
- Johann Hermann Schein; Martin Karl Woldemar Hasse: Christ lag in Todesbanden. Breitkopf und Härtel, 1923.
- Johann Hermann Schein; Martin Karl Woldemar Hasse: Christ unser Herr zum Jordan kam. Breitkopf und Härtel, 1923.
- Johann Hermann Schein; Martin Karl Woldemar Hasse: Dies sind die heiligen zehen Gebot. Breitkopf und Härtel, 1923.
- Johann Hermann Schein; Martin Karl Woldemar Hasse: Durch Adams Fall ist ganz verderbt. Breitkopf und Härtel, 1923.
- Johann Hermann Schein; Martin Karl Woldemar Hasse: Ehr sei Gott in der Höh allein. Breitkopf und Härtel, 1923.
- Johann Hermann Schein; Martin Karl Woldemar Hasse: Ein feste Burg ist unser Gott. Breitkopf und Härtel, 1923.
- Johann Hermann Schein; Martin Karl Woldemar Hasse: Erbarm dich mein, o Herre Gott. Breitkopf und Härtel, 1923.
- Johann Hermann Schein; Martin Karl Woldemar Hasse: Es ist das Heil uns kommen her. Breitkopf und Härtel, 1923.
- Johann Hermann Schein; Martin Karl Woldemar Hasse: Es spricht der Unweisen Mund wohl. Breitkopf und Härtel, 1923.
- Johann Hermann Schein; Martin Karl Woldemar Hasse: Exaudiat te Dominus. Breitkopf und Härtel, 1923.
- Johann Hermann Schein; Martin Karl Woldemar Hasse: Gehe hin, bis das End komme. Breitkopf und Härtel, 1923.
- Johann Hermann Schein; Martin Karl Woldemar Hasse: Gelobet seist du, Jesu Christ. Breitkopf und Härtel, 1923.
- Johann Hermann Schein; Martin Karl Woldemar Hasse: Gott der Vater wohn uns bei. Breitkopf und Härtel, 1923.
- Johann Hermann Schein; Martin Karl Woldemar Hasse: Gott sei mir gnädig. Breitkopf und Härtel, 1923.
- Johann Hermann Schein; Martin Karl Woldemar Hasse: Haec est dies. Breitkopf und Härtel, 1923.
- Johann Hermann Schein; Martin Karl Woldemar Hasse: Herr Christ, der eining Gottes Sohn. Breitkopf und Härtel, 1923.
- Johann Hermann Schein; Martin Karl Woldemar Hasse: Herr Gott dich loben alle wir. Breitkopf und Härtel, 1923.
- Johann Hermann Schein; Martin Karl Woldemar Hasse: Ich ruf zu dir, Herr Jesu Christ. Breitkopf und Härtel, 1923.
- Johann Hermann Schein; Martin Karl Woldemar Hasse: Ingrediente Domino. Breitkopf und Härtel, 1923.
- Johann Hermann Schein; Martin Karl Woldemar Hasse: Ist nicht Ephraim mein teuren Sohn. Breitkopf und Härtel, 1923.
- Johann Hermann Schein; Martin Karl Woldemar Hasse: Laeta redit Paschae lux. Breitkopf und Härtel, 1923.
- Johann Hermann Schein; Martin Karl Woldemar Hasse: Laetatus sum in his. Breitkopf und Härtel, 1923.
- Johann Hermann Schein; Martin Karl Woldemar Hasse: Lasset die Kindlein zu mir kommen. Breitkopf und Härtel, 1923.
- Johann Hermann Schein; Martin Karl Woldemar Hasse: Lobet den Herrn. Breitkopf und Härtel, 1923.
- Johann Hermann Schein; Martin Karl Woldemar Hasse: Mit Fried und Freud ich fahr dahin. Breitkopf und Härtel, 1923.
- Johann Hermann Schein; Martin Karl Woldemar Hasse: Mein Freund komme in seinen Garten. Breitkopf und Härtel, 1923.
- Johann Hermann Schein; Martin Karl Woldemar Hasse: Mitten wir im Leben sind. Breitkopf und Härtel, 1923.
- Johann Hermann Schein; Martin Karl Woldemar Hasse: Nun komm, der Heiden Heiland. Breitkopf und Härtel, 1923.
- Johann Hermann Schein; Martin Karl Woldemar Hasse: Maria Magdalena. Breitkopf und Härtel, 1923.
- Johann Hermann Schein; Martin Karl Woldemar Hasse: Mein Freund komme in seinen Garten. Breitkopf und Härtel, 1923.
- Johann Hermann Schein; Martin Karl Woldemar Hasse: Nun freut euch, lieben Christen gmein. Breitkopf und Härtel, 1923.
- Johann Hermann Schein; Martin Karl Woldemar Hasse: Nun lob mein Seel den Herren. Breitkopf und Härtel, 1923.
- Johann Hermann Schein; Martin Karl Woldemar Hasse: O Jesu Christe, Gottes Sohn. Breitkopf und Härtel, 1923.
- Johann Hermann Schein; Martin Karl Woldemar Hasse: O Lamm Gottes unschuldig. Breitkopf und Härtel, 1923.
- Johann Hermann Schein; Martin Karl Woldemar Hasse: Quem quaeris, Magdalena? Breitkopf und Härtel, 1923.
- Johann Hermann Schein; Martin Karl Woldemar Hasse: Quem vidistis pastores. Breitkopf und Härtel, 1923.
- Johann Hermann Schein; Martin Karl Woldemar Hasse: Sic Deus dilexit mundum. Breitkopf und Härtel, 1923.
- Johann Hermann Schein; Martin Karl Woldemar Hasse: Siehe, also wird gesegnet der Mann. Breitkopf und Härtel, 1923.
- Johann Hermann Schein; Martin Karl Woldemar Hasse: Singet fröhlich Gotte. Breitkopf und Härtel, 1923.
- Johann Hermann Schein; Martin Karl Woldemar Hasse: So freue dich, Jüngling, in deiner Jugend. Breitkopf und Härtel, 1923.
- Johann Hermann Schein; Martin Karl Woldemar Hasse: Surge, illuminare Jerusalem. Breitkopf und Härtel, 1923.
- Johann Hermann Schein; Martin Karl Woldemar Hasse: Vater unser im Himmelreich. Breitkopf und Härtel, 1923.
- Johann Hermann Schein; Martin Karl Woldemar Hasse: Venite, exultemus Domino. Breitkopf und Härtel, 1923.
- Johann Hermann Schein; Martin Karl Woldemar Hasse: Verbum caro factum est. Breitkopf und Härtel, 1923.
- Johann Hermann Schein; Martin Karl Woldemar Hasse: Vom Himmel hoch da komm ich her. Breitkopf und Härtel, 1923.
- Johann Hermann Schein; Martin Karl Woldemar Hasse: Wer unter dem Schirm. Breitkopf und Härtel, 1923.
- Johann Hermann Schein; Martin Karl Woldemar Hasse: Wo Gott der Herr nicht bei uns hält. Breitkopf und Härtel, 1923.
- Johann Hermann Schein; Martin Karl Woldemar Hasse: Wo Gott zum Haus nicht gibt sein Gunst. Breitkopf und Härtel, 1923.
