= Oscar Yatco =

Filipino-born German conductor and violinist

Background information
- Origin: University of the Philippines
- Died: 1 July 2014 (aged 84)
- Genres: classical
- Occupations: conductor
- Instruments: violin

Professor Oscar C. Yatco (died 1 July 2014) was a Filipino-born German conductor and violinist.

== Early life ==
Yatco obtained his music teacher's diploma at the young age of 16 from the University of the Philippines in 1947. He trained with renowned teachers such as Ivan Galamian at Juilliard and with Wilhelm Stross at the State Academy of Music in Munich. He won top prizes in prestigious international competitions in Germany, and eventually performed as a soloist.

== Music career ==
Yatco served as conductor, concert master, professor and music consultant for local orchestras such as the Manila Symphony Orchestra, the Cultural Centre of the Philippine Philharmonic Orchestra, and overseas in Hanover.

== See also ==
- Michael Dadap
- Andrea Veneracion
