= Ingolf Turban =

German violinist (born 1964)

Ingolf Turban (born 17 March 1964) is a German violinist.

== Life ==
Born in Munich, Turban's mother was a pianist, his father a music-loving physician, his sister Dietlinde an actress. At the age of 12 he was accepted into the violin class of Gerhart Hetzel in Munich. He also attended courses in the US with Jens Ellermann and Dorothy DeLay.

In 1985, he became first concertmaster at the age of 21 of the Munich Philharmonic under Sergiu Celibidache. Celibidache's esteem was expressed in the bon mot, "I am Celi and you are Turbi." In 1986, Celibidache let him perform as a soloist for the first time. In 1988, he left the orchestra and began a successful soloist career. In 1991 he made his debut at La Scala in Milan and in Washington.

In 1995, he received a professorship at the State University of Music and Performing Arts Stuttgart. In 2005, Turban founded the chamber orchestra "I Virtuosi di Paganini". This corresponds with his special commitment to the works of Paganini. Since 2006, Turban has been a professor at the Hochschule für Musik und Theater München.

Turban plays the great violin literature "from Bach to Berg", but also many rarely or never before heard works of all styles. Among them are curiosities such as Otto Soldan's Adagio religioso – Quartet for one violin, which is bowed over all four strings with detached bow hairs. Turban likes to play this piece as an encore.

As of 2020, Turban has released over 40 CDs, including violin-accompanied literary readings by his sister Dietlinde Turban. He is a member of the string trio Deutsches Streichtrio.

He was awarded the Günther-Klinge-Kulturpreis of the municipality of Gauting in 1999. He won the International Classical Music Awards Special-Achievement-Award 2021.
