= Rudolf Metzmacher =

German cellist

Rudolf Metzmacher (9 June 1906 – 20 January 2004), complete name Rudolf Hans Helmut Friedrich Carl Metzmacher, was a German cellist.

== Life ==
Metzmacher was born in Schwerin as son of the head teacher August Metzmacher and his wife Marie, née Schultz. He received his first music lessons from his parents and studied from 1924 to 1927 with Julius Klengel at the University of Music and Theatre Leipzig and afterwards with Hans Münch-Holland. He received further suggestions from Diran Alexianin and Hugo Becker.

He received his first position at the municipal orchestra in Szczecin. In 1930 he became first solo cellist with the Munich Philharmonic, in 1934 first solo cellist with the Hamburg Philharmonic. He also played regularly with the Bayreuth Festival orchestra.

His special love was chamber music. He played the solo suites of Johann Sebastian Bach, Max Reger, gave sonata recitals with piano and was cellist in the Hanke Quartet in 1938 and in the Stross Quartet from 1940 to 1966, which gained international fame through recordings and tours in Europe, Asia and Africa. In 1968 he and Josef Märkl founded the Märkl Quartet, of which he was a member until 1980. His straightforward style, always committed to the work, earned him great recognition.

In 1939 he was appointed professor at the newly founded Frankfurt University of Music and Performing Arts. After 1951 he was appointed professor at the Hochschule für Musik und Theater Hannover, a position he held until well after his retirement in 1971. He received further teaching posts at the Lübeck Academy of Music and at the Hochschule für Musik, Theater und Medien Hannover.

His son Ingo Metzmacher (born 1957) became a conductor. His estate is located in the music department of the Staatsbibliothek zu Berlin.

Metzmacher died in Hanover at the age of 97.
