= String Quartet No. 2 (Beethoven) =

String Quartet
- No. 2
- Early string quartet by Ludwig van Beethoven
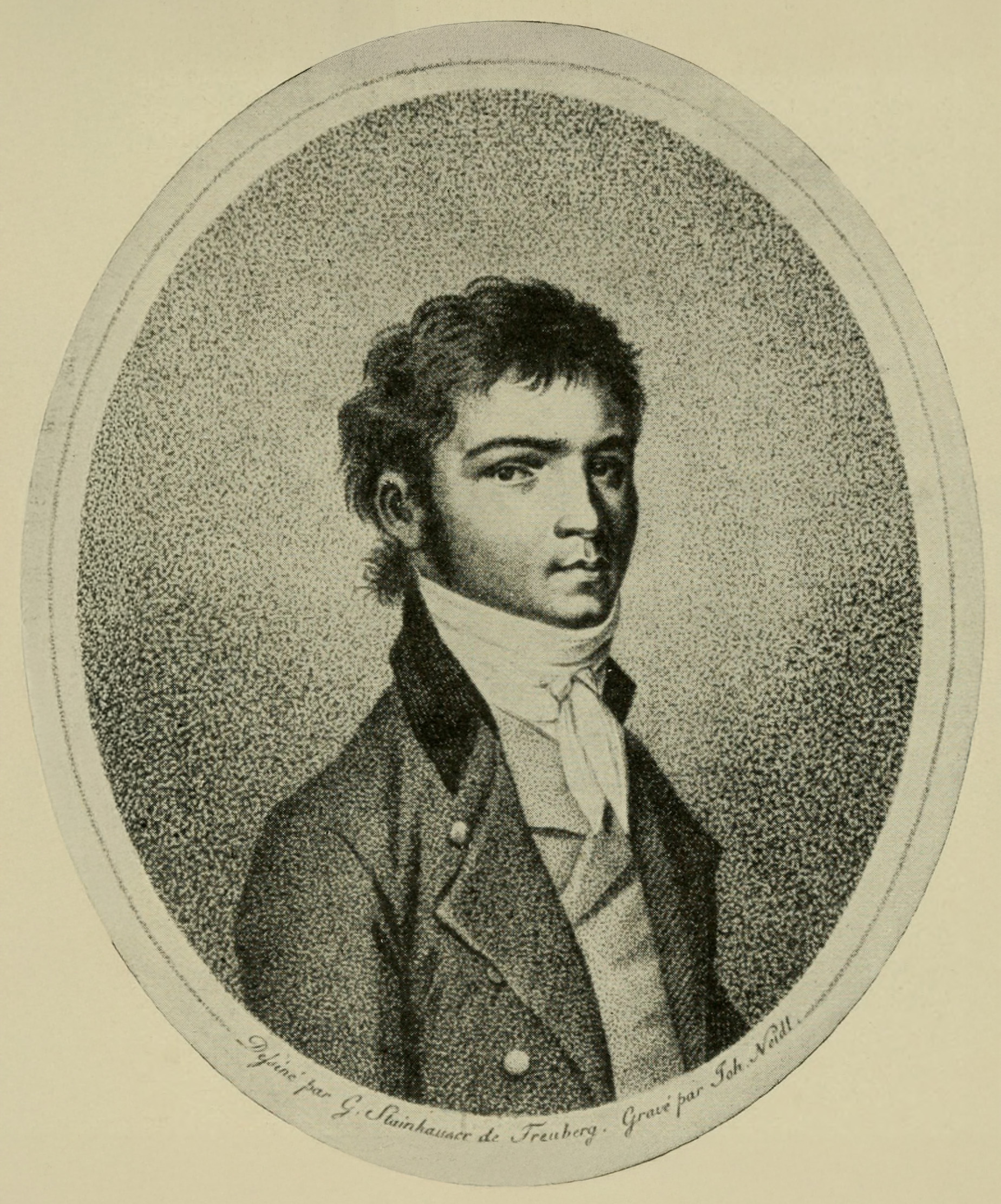
- Ludwig van Beethoven, c. 1796
- Key: G major
- Opus: 18, No. 2
- Composed: 1798–1800
- Dedication: Joseph Franz von Lobkowitz
- Published: 1801
- Movements: Four

The String Quartet No. 2 in G major, Op. 18, No. 2 (actually his third), was written by Ludwig van Beethoven between 1798 and 1800 and published in 1801, dedicated to Joseph Franz von Lobkowitz.

It consists of four movements:

1. Allegro (G major)
2. Adagio cantabile – Allegro – Tempo I (C major)
3. Scherzo: Allegro (G major) - Trio (C major)
4. Allegro molto, quasi presto (G major)

Of the Op. 18 string quartets, this one is the most grounded in 18th-century musical tradition. According to Michael Steinberg, "In German-speaking countries, the graceful curve of the first violin's opening phrase has earned the work the nickname of Komplimentier-Quartett, which might be translated as 'quartet of bows and curtseys'."

The nickname may have originated from one of Haydn's last string quartets written about the same time (Op. 77, No. 1, Hob. III:81; 1799), which was also known as the Komplimentier-Quartett. Haydn was Beethoven's teacher at the time, and there are similarities in style between the two quartets. They are also both in the key of G major.

After he finished the quartet, Beethoven was not satisfied with the second movement and wrote a replacement. Sketches of the original slow movement survive and a complete version has been reconstructed by musicologist Barry Cooper. It was performed publicly, possibly for the first time, by the Danel Quartet in the Cosmo Rodewald Concert Hall at the Martin Harris Centre, University of Manchester, on 30 September 2011.

== Bibliography ==
- Winter, Robert; Martin, Robert, eds. (1994). The Beethoven Quartet Companion. University of California Press. ISBN 0-520-08211-7; especially the essay by Michael Steinberg (pp. 155–159)
