= String Quartet No. 16 (Beethoven) =

1826 and final completed work by Beethoven

String Quartet
- No. 16
- Late string quartet by Ludwig van Beethoven
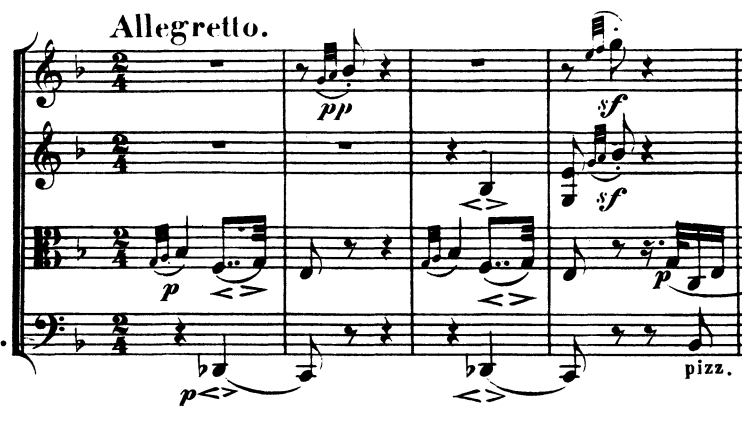
- Incipit of Beethoven's String Quartet No. 16
- Key: F major
- Opus: 135
- Composed: October 1826
- Dedication: Johann Nepomuk Wolfmayer
- Duration: c. 22 min.
- Movements: Four

Premiere
- Date: 23 March 1828
- Performers: Schuppanzigh Quartet

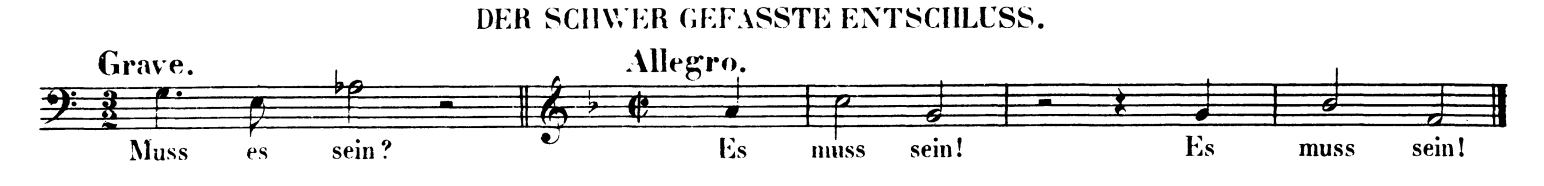
Muss es sein?

The String Quartet No. 16 in F major, Op. 135, by Ludwig van Beethoven was written in October 1826 and was the last major work he completed. Only the final movement of the Quartet Op. 130, written as a replacement for the Große Fuge, was composed later. Beethoven dedicated the composition to his patron and admirer, Johann Nepomuk Wolfmayer. The Schuppanzigh Quartet premiered the work on 23 March 1828, one year after Beethoven's death.

The Op. 135 quartet is the shortest of Beethoven's late quartets. Under the introductory slow chords in the last movement, which is headed Der schwer gefaßte Entschluß (The difficult decision), Beethoven wrote in the manuscript Muß es sein? (Must it be?) to which he responds, with the faster main theme of the movement, Es muß sein! (It must be!).

It is in four movements:

1. Allegretto (F major)
2. Vivace (F major)
3. Lento assai, cantabile e tranquillo (D♭ major)
4. Der schwer gefaßte Entschluß. Grave, ma non troppo tratto (Muss es sein?, F minor) – Allegro (Es muss sein!, F major)

The autograph manuscript of the first movement of the work is preserved in the Beethoven House.

The performance of the work takes around 22–25 minutes.

The work features in Czech author Milan Kundera's The Unbearable Lightness of Being, where the character Tomas uses the phrases Muß es sein? and Es muß sein! to describe his approach to fate.
