= Immortal Beloved =

Unsent love letter written by Ludwig van Beethoven

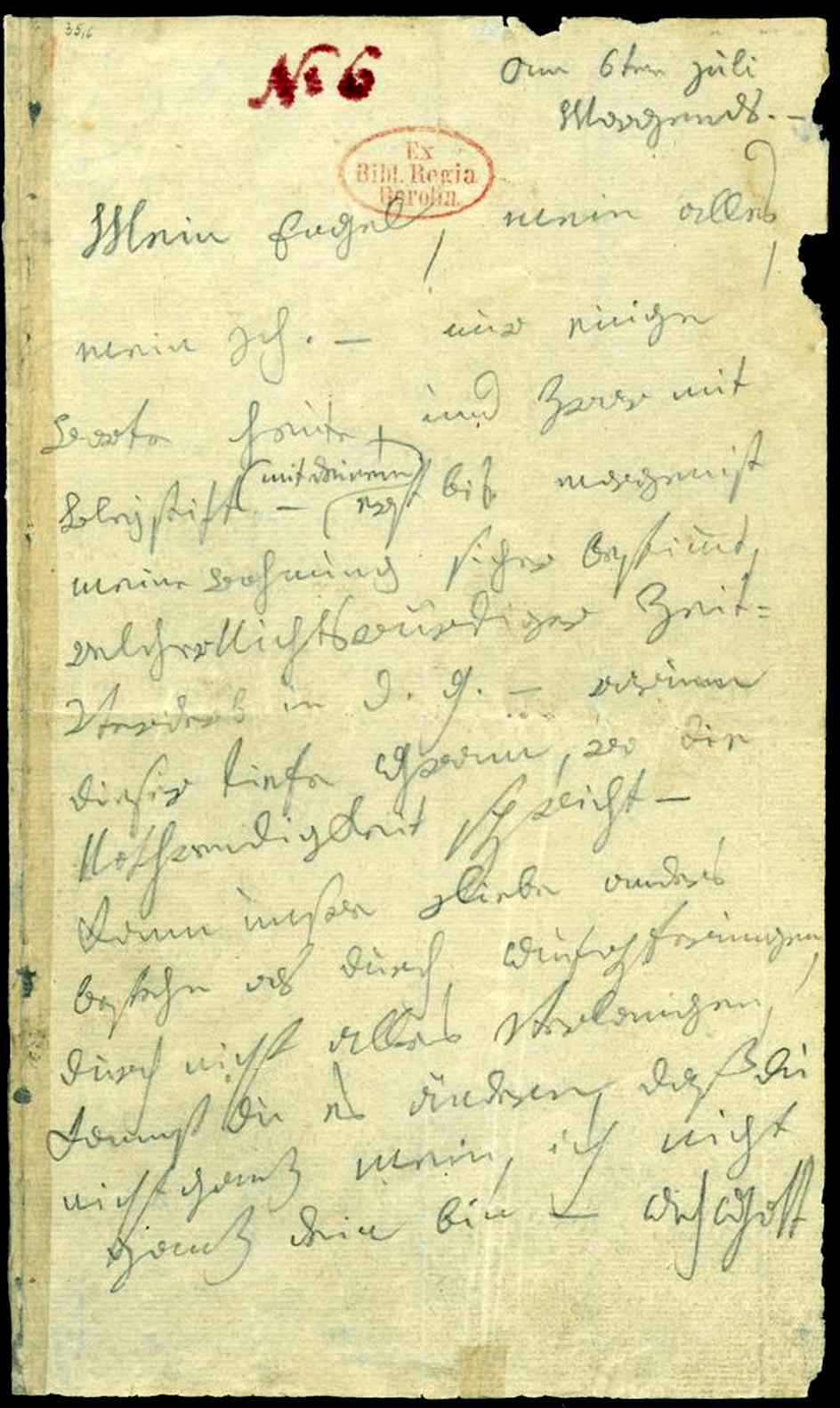
Facsimile of the first page of the letter addressed to "Immortal Beloved"

The Immortal Beloved (German "Unsterbliche Geliebte") is the addressee (Note: There was no address on the letter, and no envelope was found (thus suggesting it was probably never sent). The letter was addressed to "My Angel...", but as the term "Immortal Beloved" (appearing only once towards the end of the letter) was unique in Beethoven's vocabulary, it has been used ever since.) of a love letter which composer Ludwig van Beethoven wrote on 6 or 7 July 1812 in Teplitz (then in the Austrian Empire, now in the Czech Republic). The unsent letter is written in pencil on 10 small pages. (Note: For a facsimile, see Brandenburg 2001.) (Note: For a transcription of the German original, an English translation and helpful historical context, see Brandenburg 2001. The letter was also published by Brandenburg 1996, Letter #582, and Goldschmidt 1980, pp. 21–23; facsimile p. 240 f. An early English translation, with several errors, was offered by Anderson (1961), Letter #373; a much better translation is in Beahrs (1990).) It was found in the composer's estate following his death and is now in the Berlin State Library. (Note: The letter's signature is "Mus. ep. autogr. Beethoven 127.")

Beethoven did not specify a year or a location. In the 1950s an analysis of the paper's watermark yielded the year, and by extension the place of the letter. Scholars disagree about the intended recipient of the letter. Two people favored by most contemporary scholars are Antonie Brentano and Josephine Brunsvik. (Other possibilities include Johanna van Beethoven, Julie ("Giulietta") Guicciardi, (Note: Her first name was in fact "Julie", as she was always called (Steblin 2009a); in Beethoven's dedication of his Piano Sonata No. 14 (Op. 27, No. 2), which was written in Italian, he referred to her as "Giulietta". For some reason this name has stuck ever since (one of many myths about her, like her incorrect age and wedding date, see Steblin 2009a, p. 145.) Therese Brunsvik, Amalie Sebald, Dorothea von Ertmann, Therese Malfatti, Anna Maria Erdődy, and Bettina von Arnim. (Note: According to Varnhagen's diary, 15 February 1856: "Bettina ... claims Beethoven had been in love with her and wanted to marry her! ... Nothing but bubbles and dreams! (Schaum und Traum)" (Tellenbach 1983, p. 101). Being happily married to Achim von Arnim since 1811, she is usually considered one of the less likely candidates for the title of "Immortal Beloved".))

== Text analysis ==
After Schmidt-Görg (1957) published 13 then-unknown love letters by Beethoven to Josephine Brunsvik, it became clear that the one to the "Immortal Beloved" was not the only love letter authored by him. That Josephine could have been the unknown woman was subsequently suggested by analyses of similarities in wordings and phrases between earlier letters (from 1804 to 1809) and this mysterious one from 1812, mainly in the monographs by Massin (1967, 1970), Goldschmidt (1980) and Tellenbach (1983), p. 103ff):

- My angel (used again towards the end of this letter): see "farewell angel – of my heart – of my life." (#219, April 1805) – this also uses the intimate German "Du" ("Leb wohl Engel"); "farewell angel of my heart" (#220, April/May 1805).
- My everything, you – you – my life – my everything: see "you – you – my everything, my happiness ... my solace – my everything" (#214, 1st quarter 1805); "dear J. everything – everything for you" (#297, after 20 September 1807).
- Esterhazy: This Hungarian Prince was well known to the Hungarian Brunsviks.
- remain my faithful only, your faithful ludwig, since you know my faithfulness to you, never can another own my heart, never – never, never misjudge the most faithful heart of your beloved L., forever thine, forever mine, forever us: see "Long – Long – may our love last – it is so noble – so much founded on mutual respect and friendship – even great similarity in so many things, in thoughts and feelings – oh let me hope that your heart – will continue to beat for me for a long time – mine can only – stop – to beat for you – if – it does not beat any more – beloved J" (#216, March/April 1805); "your faithful Bethwn" (#279, May 1807); "your faithful Bthwn, eternally devoted to you" (#294, 20 September 1807). Clearly refers to a pre-existing long-term relationship.
- You are suffering you my dearest ... you are suffering – Oh, wherever I am, you are with me: Josephine was not only frequently ill, but especially desperate around that time because her husband had left her.
- but – but never hide yourself from me: During 1807, Josephine began to withdraw from Beethoven due to family pressure; she was not home when Beethoven came to see her (see #294 and #307).
- I must go to bed ~~o go with me go with me~~: the heavily crossed-out words are probably the strongest indication that their love had been consummated (and may explain the birth of Minona, Josephine's seventh child, exactly nine months later).

== The period of speculation (1827 to 1969) ==
In his 1840 biography of Beethoven, Anton Schindler named Julie ("Giulietta") Guicciardi as the "Immortal Beloved". (Note: Beethoven was briefly infatuated with her in 1801/1802 (when she was his piano pupil, and dedicated his renowned "Moonlight" Sonata to her), but was aware that without a title of nobility he could not hope to marry a countess.) But research by Tellenbach (1983) indicated that Giulietta's cousin Franz von Brunsvik may have suggested her to Schindler, to distract any suspicion away from his sister Josephine Brunsvik, with whom Beethoven had been hopelessly in love from 1799 to around 1809/1810. (Note: "... da Giulietta ihre Affären nicht verheimlichte..." [... since Giulietta did not cover up her affairs...]) La Mara (1909) published Therese Brunsvik's memoirs, which show her full of admiration and adoration of Beethoven. This, together with interviews of some of the Brunsvik descendants, led her to the conclusion that Therese must have been the "Immortal Beloved".

At first, most researchers, including Alexander Wheelock Thayer, also believed Therese was the "Immortal Beloved". Thayer thought the letter must have been written around 1806–07. Thomas-San-Galli (1909, 1910) checked out the official listings of guests in Bohemia, and at first (in 1909) concluded that Amalie Sebald was the "Immortal Beloved". Sebald was definitely not in Prague at the beginning of July, 1812, and Cooper consequently ruled her out as a possibility. Thomas-San-Galli then speculated (in 1910) that it might instead have been Therese Brunsvik, whom he believed could have secretly traveled to Prague.

Doubts were raised by Hevesy (1910), who ruled out Therese Brunsvik, (the "Louis" mentioned by Therese in her diary was, in fact, Count Louis Migazzi) and by Unger (1910) against Amalie Sebald. (Note: "The tone of the notes to Amalie Sebald in September, 1812, is incompatible with that of the letter to the 'Immortal Beloved'.") A summary of the older literature can be found in Forbes's work.

There was also a forged Beethoven letter by Paul Bekker in Die Musik. (Note: Reprinted in Goldschmidt (1980). This forgery fooled many scholars at the time: "The editors of 'Die Musik' submitted this Beethoven manuscript to many well-known experts, all of whom independently declared it to be genuine." [Die Redaktion der "Musik" legte dieses Beethoven-Manuskript vielen bekannten Fachleuten vor, welche alle unabhängig voneinander das Stück für echt erklärten.] (Goldschmidt 1980). Not enough: "Bekker made it then public that his Beethoven letter was a hoax. [But] many Beethoven scholars did not want to believe this, and in many newspapers and journals ... expressed their conviction that this was undoubtedly a valuable genuine document." [... veröffentlichte Bekker, der von ihm publizierte Beethoven-Brief sei eine Fälschung. Viele Beethoven-Forscher wollten dies aber nicht glauben und gaben in Tages- und Fachzeitschriften ihrer Überzeugung Ausdruck, daß es sich zweifellos um ein wertvolles echtes Stück handelt.] (Goldschmidt 1980) But it was already shown to be a hoax by Newman (1911)—a last-ditch effort to salvage the discredited Guicciardi hypothesis.

The date of the "Immortal Beloved" letter—6/7 July 1812—has meanwhile been firmly established, not only by watermarks and references, (Note: Beethoven's mention in the letter of Prince Esterházy's presence at Teplitz confirms that the year must have been 1812.() but also by a later letter by Beethoven to Rahel Varnhagen, which suggests he must have met his "Immortal Beloved" on 3 July 1812: "I am sorry, dear V., that I could not spend the last evening in Prague with you, and I myself found it impolite, but a circumstance I could not foresee prevented me." (Note: "... es war mir leid, lieber V. den letzten Abend in Prag nicht mit ihnen zubringen zu können, und ich fand es selbst für unanständig, allein ein Umstand den ich nicht vorhersehen könnte, hielt mich davon ab." (Beethoven to Varnhagen, 14 July 1812))

La Mara (1920), after discovering more letters and notes in the Brunsvik estates, was now convinced "that ... Josephine widowed Countess Deym was Beethoven's 'Immortal Beloved'". (Note: "... drängte sich mir die Überzeugung auf, daß ... Josephine verwitwete Gräfin Deym die 'unsterbliche Geliebte' Beethovens ... sei.")

Czeke (1938), for the first time, published Therese's diary notes ending in 1813; some were known already to Rolland (1928). (Note: Rolland was in contact with Marianne Czeke, who seemed to have known quite a lot more about the relationship between Beethoven and the Brunsviks.) and concluded that Beethoven was in love with Josephine, but nonetheless he tended towards Therese as the "Immortal Beloved".

Kaznelson evaluated more of the documents in the Brunsvik estates, and even though he thought that Rahel Varnhagen was behind the "Distant Beloved", he concluded that the "Immortal Beloved" must have been Josephine mainly because her daughter Minona was born exactly nine months after the encounter with Beethoven and her husband Baron Stackelberg was away. Kaznelson arrived at his conclusion even though Hans Conrad Bodmer in Zurich, owner of the "13 Letters" after World War II (see following), would not allow him access to them.

Editha and Richard Sterba, using psychoanalysis, argued for Beethoven's nephew Karl as the "Immortal Beloved".

Steichen identified Marie Erdödy to have been a lifelong beloved of Beethoven, and thus she could also be the "Immortal Beloved".

George R. Marek (1969) argued the case for Dorothea Von Ertmann.

== The discovery of Josephine Brunsvik (1957–1999) ==
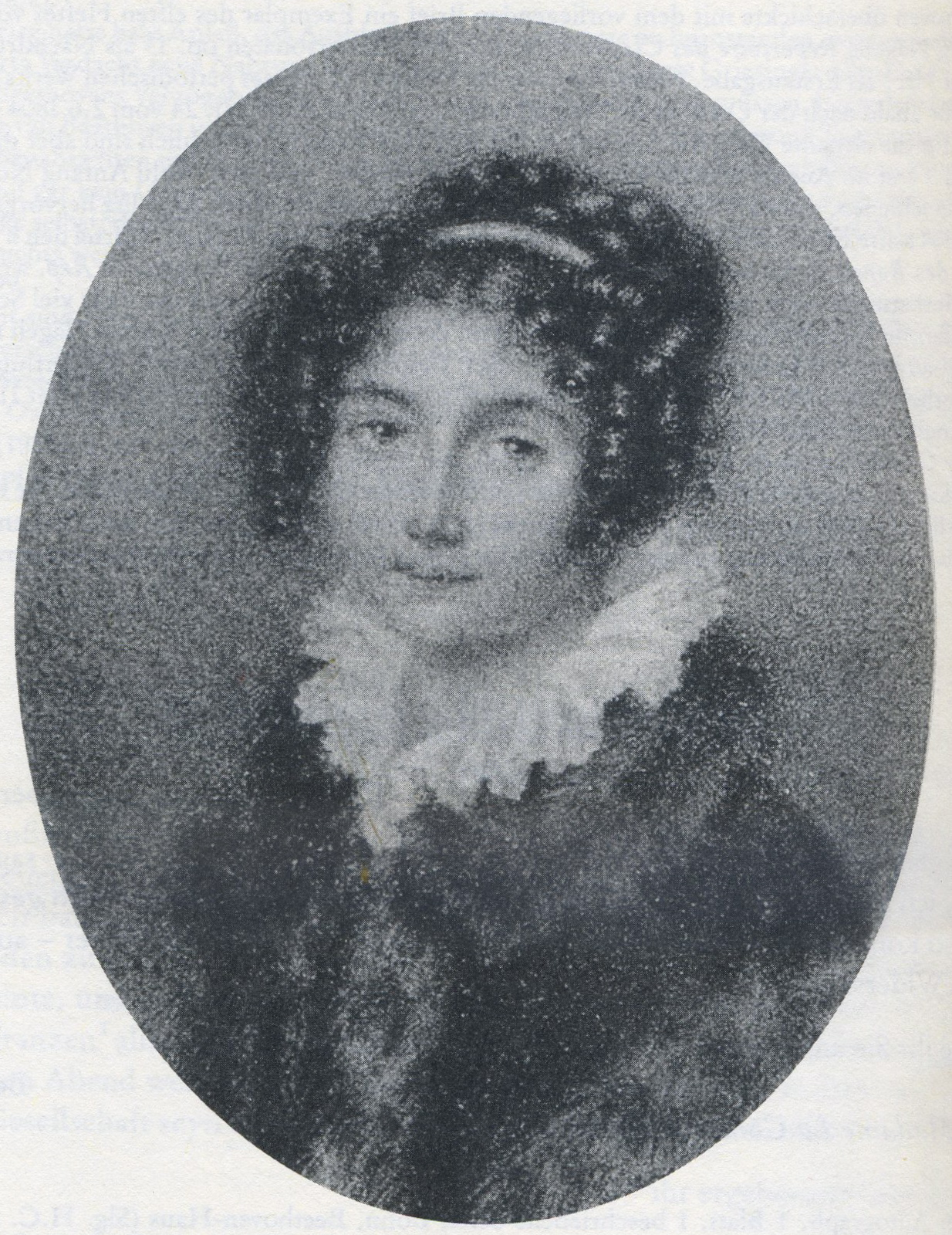
Josephine Brunsvik, miniature drawn by pencil, before 1804

Schmidt-Görg published 13 heretofore unknown love letters by Beethoven to Josephine Brunsvik (and a draft letter by him that survived as a copy by Josephine), that could be dated to the period from 1804 to 1809/10 when she was a widow after the early death of her first husband Count Deym. (Note: More love letters (also by Josephine to Beethoven) were published by Schmidt-Görg (1969)) Schmidt-Görg dismissed Kaznelson's discoveries as "sensationalist". Goldschmidt explains why the German Beethoven scholarship was so reluctant to accept Kaznelson's theory (already published before these "13 letters"): "The fact that, as a result of this meeting, they had to take a natural daughter into account, appeared so venturesome to the professional world that the resistance to the Josephine hypothesis stiffened noticeably." (Note: "Der Umstand, daß man ... als Folge dieser Begegnung eine natürliche Tochter in Kauf zu nehmen hatte, erschien der professionellen Welt als so abenteuerlich, daß die Widerstände gegen die Josephinen-Hypothese sich merklich versteiften.") Schmidt-Görg (1957) believed that with the last letter (which he still thought to have been written in 1807—not 1809) and with Josephine's marriage to Baron Stackelberg (in 1810) the love relationship was terminated.

Ley (1957) saw it differently:

Only on the negative side has one been able to arrive at certain conclusions: neither Giulietta Guicciardi, nor Amalie Sebald, nor Bettina Brentano can be considered any longer, and not even Therese Brunsvik, who for a long time was seriously regarded as the recipient of the famous love letter. But curiously enough, it is precisely the same documents which shed a definitive light, in the negative sense, on Therese which bear witness to Beethoven's passionate love for her sister Josephine." (Note: "Nur im Negieren ist man in der Lage, zu eindeutigen Schlüssen zu gelangen: weder Giulietta Guicciardi noch Amalie Sebald oder Bettina Brentano können in Frage kommen, und nicht einmal Therese Brunsvik, die für eine lange Zeit ernsthaft als die Empfängerin des berühmten Liebesbriefess galt. Aber merkwürdigerweise sind es genau die gleichen Dokumente, die definitiv, im negativen Sinne, auf Therese hinweisen, Zeugnis von leidenschaftlicher Liebe Beethovens für ihre Schwester Josephine.")

Riezler, still very much a "standard" German biography of Beethoven, followed Kaznelson regarding Josephine being his "only love", likewise Dahlhaus who concluded that "internal evidence" points to Josephine. (Note: In a review of Tellenbach (1983) in the leading German newspaper Frankfurter Allgemeine Zeitung (on 24 February 1984), Dahlhaus stated: "Daß Beethovens berühmter 'Brief an die unsterbliche Geliebte'... an Josephine von Brunswick gerichtet war, steht inzwischen fest. [That Beethoven's famous "Letter to the Immortal Beloved"... was addressed to Josephine von Brunsvik, is now a well established fact.])

The French authors Jean and Brigitte Massin (1967) identified Josephine as the "Immortal Beloved", mainly based on comparisons of the "Letter to the Immortal Beloved" with the earlier 14 (15) love letters: "The letter to the 'Immortal Beloved'... not only uses similar wording, but also emphasizes his long-time faithfulness to his one and only Beloved." In addition, with regard to traces in Beethoven's compositions, the "Massins argue that... the presence of Josephine in Beethoven's life left traces in his music... From the standpoint of music theory, the connections make eminent sense."

After Massin & Massin (1967) and Goldschmidt (1980), Tellenbach (1983, 1987, 1988, 1999) argued extensively the case for Josephine, based on many newly discovered documents, like Therese's later diary notes, e.g., on the discovery of the "Three letters by Beethoven... they must have been to Josephine whom he loved passionately." (Note: "3 Briefe von Beethoven... sie werden wohl an Josephine sein, die er leidenschaftlich geliebt hat." (Therese's Diary, 15 January 1847) This was then also in response to the biography by Schindler (1840), refuting his hypothesis that Julie Guicciardi was the "Immortal Beloved".)

"Beethoven! It is like a dream, that he was the friend, the confidant of our house—a beautiful mind! Why did not my sister Josephine, as widow Deym, take him as her husband? Josephine's soul-mate! They were born for each other. She would have been happier with him than with Stackelberg. Maternal affection made her forgo her own happiness." (Note: "Beethoven! ist es doch wie ein Traum, [daß] er der Freund, der Vertraute unseres Hauses war – ein herrlicher Geist – warum nahm ihn meine Schwester J. nicht zu ihrem Gemahl als Witwe Deym? Josephines Herzensfreund! Sie waren für einander geboren. Sie wäre glücklicher gewesen als mit St[ackelberg]. Mutterliebe bestimmte sie—auf eigenes Glück zu verzichten." (Therese's Diary, 4 February 1846)) She could not contemplate marrying Beethoven, a commoner, for the simple reason that she would have lost the guardianship of her aristocratic children. (Note: "I would have to violate sacred bonds if I gave in to your request – Believe me – that I, by doing what is my duty, suffer the most—and that surely noble motives were guiding my actions." [Ich müßte heilige Bande verletzen, gäbe ich Ihrem Verlangen Gehör – Glauben Sie—daß ich, durch Erfüllung meiner Pflichten, am meisten leide—und daß gewiß, edle Beweggründe meine Handlungen leiteten.] (Josephine to Beethoven, Winter 1806/7) See also Tellenbach (1988) for the effect of guardianship laws.)

Again Therese on Beethoven: "How unhappy, with such intellectual talent. At the same time Josephine was unhappy! Le mieux est l'ennemi du bien—both together they would have been happy (perhaps). What he needed was a wife, that's for sure." (Note: "Wie unglüklich bei so grossen Geistesgaben. Zu gleicher Zeit war Josephine unglüklich! Le mieux est l'enemi du bien – sie beide zusammen wären glüklich gewesen (vielleicht). Ihm hat eine Frau gefehlt[,] das ist gewiß." (Therese's Diary, 22 December 1846))

"I was so lucky to have been acquainted with Beethoven, intimately and intellectually, for so many years! Josephine's intimate friend, her soul mate! They were born for each other, and if both were still alive, they would be united." (Note: "Ich Glückliche hatte Beethovens intimen, geistigen Umgang so viele Jahre! Josephinens Haus- und Herzensfreund! Sie waren für einander geboren[,] und lebten beide noch, hätten sie sich vereint." (Therese's Diary, March 1848))

Goldschmidt's evaluation of the Josephine hypothesis: "Without conclusive proofs of the opposite one should no longer want to part prematurely with the increasingly justified assumption that the 'Immortal Beloved' could hardly be anyone else but the 'Only Beloved'." (Note: "Ohne schlüssige Beweise des Gegenteils wird man sich nicht mehr voreilig von der zunehmend begründeten Annahme trennen wollen, daß die 'Unsterbliche Geliebte' schwerlich eine andere als die 'Einzig Geliebte' war.")

Josephine's candidacy as the "Immortal Beloved" was contested by Solomon (1988), mainly in response to Massin (1967, 1970), Goldschmidt (1980) and Tellenbach (1983).

== Antonie Brentano and other alternatives (1955–2011) ==
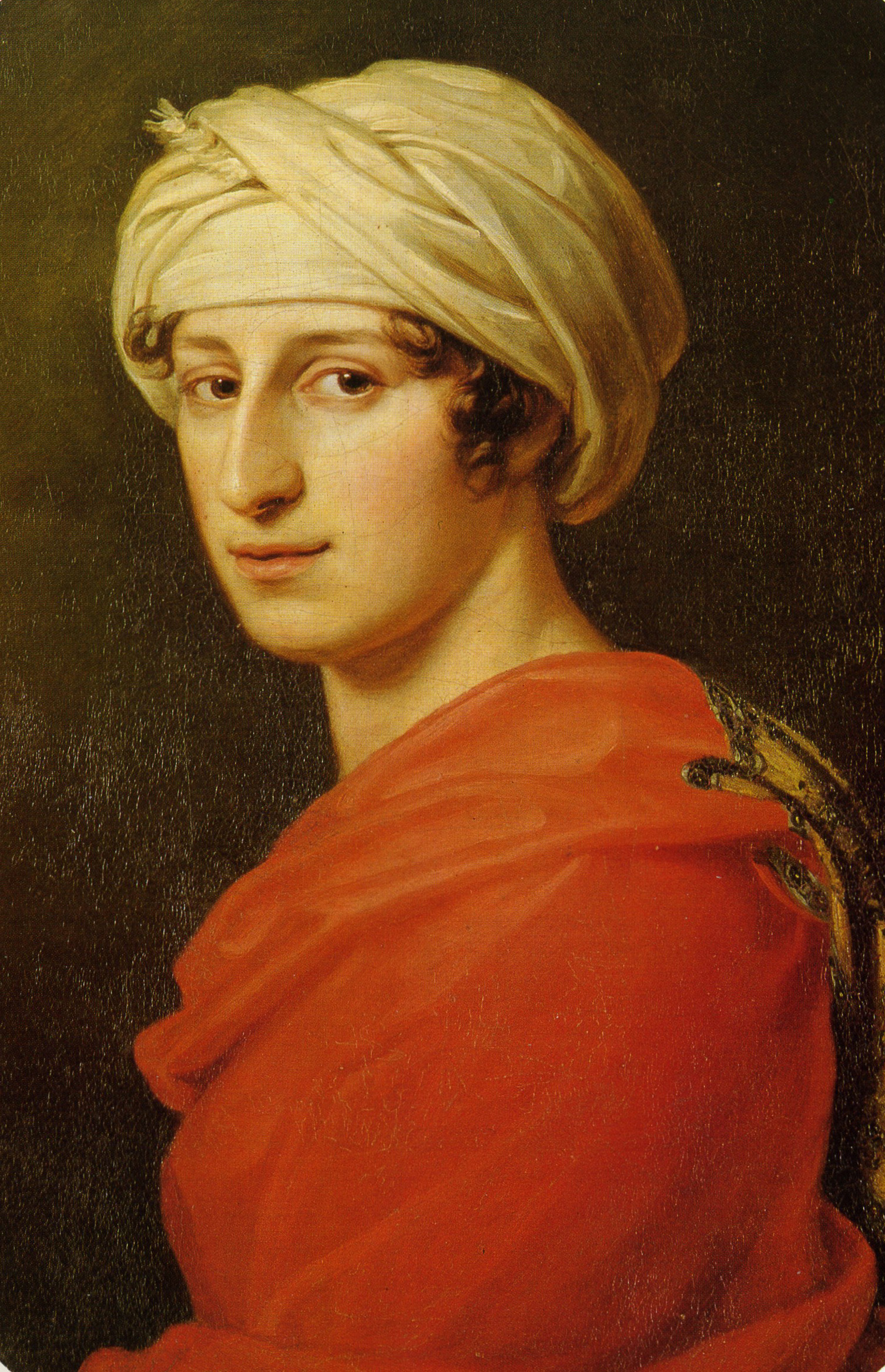
Antonie Brentano, portrait by Joseph Karl Stieler, 1808

In 1955, the French scholars Jean and Brigitte Massin noted that Antonie Brentano was present in Prague and Karlsbad at the time and proposed her as a possible candidate for the "Immortal Beloved":

"The assumption that it could have been Antonie Brentano, is both tantalizing and absurd." (Note: "L'hypothèse d'Antonia Brentano est à la fois séduisante et absurde.") They then argue:

"Tantalizing" is the assumption, because

- Beethoven and Antonie, since her return to Vienna, were "on friendly terms",
- In the summer of 1812 he lived in the same hotel in Franzensbad as the Brentanos, and
- He had dedicated in the same year to her daughter Maxe a one-movement trio.

"Absurd", they argue, is the assumption because of

- Beethoven's lasting friendship with Antonie's husband, Franz,
- He borrowed money from him, and
- "The many letters he wrote Antonie prove that a true and deep but—due to mutual restraint—nevertheless only formal friendship existed between them and Beethoven always seems to perceive Franz, Antonia and their children as an inseparable unity." (Note: "...les nombreuses lettres qu'il écrira à Antonina marquent une amitié profonde mais presque cérémonieuse à force d'être réservée, et Beethoven semble toujours considérer Franz, Antonia et leurs enfants comme un ensemble undivisible.")

There was four years later also a claim by Japanese author Yayoi Aoki who had "discovered" Antonie. However, this had not been noticed outside Japan. She also published her findings again in a recent book in German.

Once again and more detailed Solomon (1972, 1998) suggested Antonie Brentano to have been the "Immortal Beloved". (Note: He used documents about Beethoven's and the Brentanos' whereabouts discovered by Marek (1969); see Goldschmidt (1980).) His hypothesis was founded on two major assumptions (or prerequisites):

1. the woman must have been in Prague and Karlsbad around the time in question (like Beethoven); (Note: "The sine qua non for identification of the Immortal Beloved is that she must have been in Karlsbad during the week of 6 July 1812.")
2. she must have been closely acquainted (at least on very friendly terms) with Beethoven, at the time immediately before this event. (Note: "... requirements ..., that the Immortal Beloved be a woman closely acquainted with Beethoven during the period in question.")

ad 1: Antonie arrived in Prague on 3 July 1812 after an arduous journey with husband, child and servant (and was registered there); she left at dawn the following morning: "Where did she have time that night for a tryst with Beethoven?" Solomon admits: "There is no proof that Beethoven and Antonie met in Prague." And regarding Karlsbad: "It is possible that the letter arose from a ... meeting with a woman who informed Beethoven that she was going to Karlsbad and then failed to carry out her declared intention." Goldschmidt showed that "for short stays, residents [as opposed to foreigners] were exempt from reporting requirements". (Note: "Von der Meldepflicht bei Kurzaufenthalten waren ... Inländer befreit.")

ad 2: There are no love letters from or to Antonie, and no other documents supporting the possibility of a love relationship with Beethoven, there is only a letter by Antonie to her brother-in-law Clemens, where she expressed her "admiration" of Beethoven: (Note: "Beethovens heilige Hände ...[,] den ich tief verehre, er wandelt göttlich under den Sterblichen, sein höheren Standpunkt gegen die niedere Welt." [Beethoven's sacred hands, whom I deeply admire, he is walking divinely among mortals, his elevated stature opposed to the world beneath.] (Antonie to Clemens, 26 January 1811)) "At what point this worship was transformed into love is not yet known. My estimate is ... in the fall of 1811. ... The love affair was under way by late 1811." Solomon (1998), p. 229 quotes as supporting his case the song "An die Geliebte" [To the Beloved] WoO 140, an autograph of which contains in Antonie's handwriting the remark: "Requested by me from the author on 2 March 1812." (Note: "Den 2tn März, 1812 mir vom Author erbethen.) The background to this: "In November 1811, we see Beethoven writing a newly composed song with the heading 'An die Geliebte' [To the Beloved] into the album of the Bavarian Court singer Regina Lang. ... Dilettante verses ... by a clumsy author, a real dilettante, a coffeehouse poet." (Note: "November 1811 sehen wir Beethoven ein neuverfaßtes Lied mit der Überschrift 'An die Geliebte' der bayerischen Hofsängerin Regina Lang ins Stammbuch schreiben. ... Die dilettantischen Verse haben ebenfalls Stammbuchcharakter. Als den linkischen Verfasser ... von einem wirklichen Dilettanten, dem Kaffeehaus-Literaten Joseph Ludwig Stoll." (Goldschmidt 1980, pp. 138 f.) Goldschmidt's judgement about Stoll (1777–1815) is far too negative however. Stoll was a very successful playwright, who from 1809 on even received an honorary pension from Napoleon.) Solomon (1972), p. 572 declares that Beethoven's separation from his "Only Beloved" Josephine two years before (due to her second marriage) does not rule out that she could have been the "Immortal Beloved": "There is no certainty that the affair was not momentarily rekindled a half-decade later. ... There is still room for a reasonable doubt."

Solomon's hypothesis was contested by Goldschmidt (1980), Tellenbach (1983, 1987, 1988, 1993–1994, 1998), Beahrs (1972, 1986, 1988, 1993), Dahlhaus (1991), Pichler (1994), Altman (1996), Meredith (2000), Steblin, Walden, (Note: "The flaw in this [Solomon's] methodology [in Support of Antonie] was that he established requirements that he knew only his candidate could meet. They were therefore not independent objective requirements at all.") Caeyers, and Swafford (2014).

Goldschmidt summarizes: "The Antonia hypothesis... is not so fully convincing that it excludes all others." (Note: ...die Antonia-Hypothese ... nicht so restlos überzeugend ist, daß sie jede andere ausschließt.) and: "In order to possibly verify the Antonia-Hypothesis with its inherent factual contradictions once and forever, it is necessary to falsify the other hypotheses that have been offered." (Note: "Um die Antonia–Hypothese möglicherweise mit den ihr sachlich innewaltenden Widersprüchen endgültig zu verifizieren, bedarf es der Falsifizierung anderer sich anbietender Hypothesen.")

Altman (1996) "demonstrates, as indeed Tellenbach has done, that much of the basis for the claims of Antonie's supporters consists of distortions, suppositions, opinions, and even plain inaccuracies."

However, Altman's suggestion that the "Immortal Beloved" was Marie Erdödy was shown to be "impossible" by Cooper. (Note: It had already been refuted by Goldschmidt (1980) with regard to Steichen (1959). Cooper's statement however that "To get to Jedlersee from Klosterneuburg, you have to cross the Kahlenberg." left a lot to be desired, as far as basic expertise in Viennese topography is concerned.)

Lund (1988) made a claim that Antonie's son Karl, born on 8 March 1813, exactly eight months after the alleged encounter with Beethoven, should have been his son; even Solomon did not endorse this, as he thought "it was 'sensationalistic'."

Beahrs supported Josephine: "Was there for him in fact ... one deep and lasting passion for a certain dear one, marriage to whom was precluded, not by psychological inhibitions of the inner man, but by prohibitive heart-breaking externals? ... Where is any evidence whatsoever of true romantic love for even such dear ones as Marie Erdödy or Dorothea von Ertmann, Therese Malfatti or Antonie Brentano? Although all have been advanced as Beethoven's unknown Immortal Beloved, the assessment is unsupported by the record or by any known correspondence. Intimate friends of Beethoven, true, one and all; but loves? There is one, however, and only one, to whom Beethoven did pour his heart out in impassioned declarations of undying love remarkably similar to the phraseology of the anguished letter to his Immortal Beloved... That one is his 'Beloved and Only J' – Josephine."

Pulkert's (2000) claim about one Almerie Esterházy, whom Beethoven did not even know, was refuted by Steblin (2001). Meredith summarily comments: "... we lack evidence of a connection between Almerie and Beethoven... I must reiterate that we have no such evidence of a passionate love relationship between Antonie and Beethoven either, just of a close friendship; for Josephine, ... we know he was indeed passionately in love with her in 1805–1807 at least."

Finally, Kopitz' "valiant effort... show[ed] that Antonie cannot have been the 'Immortal Beloved'. She was a happily married wife and mother... her candidacy, which includes the improbable scenario of a 'ménage à trois' in Karlsbad, makes no psychological sense."

Walden suggests that Bettina Brentano was Beethoven's "Immortal Beloved", based on the assumption that one of the two spurious letters by Beethoven to her is true: "If that letter to Bettina was genuine, it would prove conclusively that Bettina was the Immortal Beloved, but the original has not survived, and the authenticity is strongly doubted today. ... her reliability and truthfulness are today under a cloud." (Note: Two of three letters by Beethoven to Bettina (and published by her) are generally considered forgeries (like similar letters by Goethe she published), although Walden (2011) devotes an entire chapter setting out evidence in support of the letter's authenticity. Walden's book is also summarized and reviewed by Patricia Stroh in the Beethoven Journal 26 (2011), p. 34.) Meredith, in his "Introduction", has reviewed the debate over the major candidates and he believes that "Walden's proposal merits unbiased consideration".

Meredith, reviewing the history of the debate so far, deplores the fact that French and German authors (like Massin & Massin and – until then – Goldschmidt) were never translated into English, thus depriving especially the US-based Beethoven scholarship of the most valuable resources in this field of study: "Unfortunately, several of the most important and controversial studies about the Immortal Beloved have never appeared in English translation, which has substantially restricted their impact." "Tellenbach ... too has unfortunately never appeared in English translation."

== Josephine re-discovered (2002–present) ==
Significant new discoveries in European archives were made and published by Steblin and Skwara & Steblin (2007). These can be summarized into two important items:

1. Josephine's estranged husband Baron Stackelberg was most likely away from home at the beginning of July 1812 (probably from the end of June for ca. two months), as noted in her diary: "Today has been a difficult day for me. – The hand of fate is resting ominously on me – I saw besides my own deep sorrows also the degeneration of my children, and – almost – all courage deserted me –!!! ... Stackelberg wants to leave me on my own. He is callous to supplicants in need." (Note: "Ich habe heute einen schweren Tag. – Die Hand des Schicksals ruht düster auf mir – Ich sah nebst meinem tiefen Kummer auch noch die Entartung meiner Kinder und – fast – aller Muth wich von mir –!!! ... St. will daß ich mir selbst sitzen soll. er ist gefühllos für bittende in der Noth." (Josephine's Diary, 8 June 1812)) Steblin also discovered a document headed "Table of Rules" and dated 5–11 July with a list of ethical categories in the handwriting of Christoph von Stackelberg: "Thus this whole document, dated at the time when ... he ... was deliberating about his future, is surely further proof that Josephine was left alone ... in June and July 1812."
2. Josephine expressed her clear intention to go to Prague (in June 1812): "I want to see Liebert in Prague. I will never let the children be taken from me. ... On account of Stackelberg I have ruined myself physically, in that I have incurred so much distress and illness through him." (Note: "Ich will Liebert in Prag sprechen. ich will die Kinder nie von mir lassen. ... Ich habe Stackb zu liebe [mich] physisch zugrunde gerichtet indem ich ... noch so viele Kummer und Krankheit durch ihn zugezogen habe." (Josephine's Diary, June 1812)) "A new way of looking at old evidence confirms that Josephine was Beethoven's one and only 'Immortal Beloved'. ... All of the puzzling aspects about Beethoven's affair with the 'Immortal Beloved', including his various cryptic comments, can be explained in terms of his one known beloved – Josephine. Why do we doubt his word that there was only one woman who had captured his heart?"

== In art ==
=== 1994 film ===
In the 1994 film Immortal Beloved, written and directed by Bernard Rose, the Immortal Beloved is Beethoven's sister-in-law Johanna Reiss, with whom he had a long and frustrating legal battle over the custody of his nephew Karl van Beethoven.

=== In music ===
Canadian composer James K. Wright wrote a song cycle for baritone (or mezzo-soprano) and piano trio titled Briefe an die unsterbliche Geliebte/Letters to the Immortal Beloved (2012). The cycle sets excerpts from Beethoven's letter of 6–7 July 1812. The Gryphon Trio recorded the work with Canadian mezzo-soprano Julie Nesrallah in 2015 and in 2019 with Luxembourg baritone David John Pike.

== Notes ==
=== Sources ===
- Altman, Gail S. (1996). Beethoven: A Man of His Word – Undisclosed Evidence for his Immortal Beloved. Anubian Press. ISBN 1-888071-01-X.
- Anderson, Emily, ed. (1961). The Letters of Beethoven. London: Macmillan.
- Aoki, Yayoi (1959). "愛の伝説 – ベトヴェンと'不滅の恋人'" [Love-legends – Beethoven and the 'Immortal Beloved']. Philharmony (in Japanese). Vol. 31, no. 7. NHK Symphony Orchestra. pp. 8–21.
- Aoki, Yayoi (1968). 愛の伝説 恋人としての芸術家と女たち [Legends of Love: Artists and Women as Lovers] (in Japanese). Tokyo: San-Ichi Shobo Publishing (三一書房).
- Aoki, Yayoi (2008). Beethoven – Die Entschlüsselung des Rätsels um die "Unsterbliche Geliebte" [Beethoven – The Decryption of the Riddle about the "Immortal Beloved"] (in German). Munich: Iudicium.
- Beahrs, Virginia Oakley (1972). "New Light on Beethoven's Immortal Beloved?". Michigan Quarterly Review. Vol. 11, no. 3. pp. 177–185.
- Beahrs, Virginia Oakley (1986). "The Immortal Beloved Revisited". Beethoven Newsletter. Vol. 1, no. 2. pp. 22–24.
- Beahrs, Virginia Oakley (February 1988). "The Immortal Beloved Riddle Reconsidered". The Musical Times. Vol. 129, no. 1740. pp. 64–70. doi:10.2307/964418. JSTOR 964418.
- Beahrs, Virginia Oakley (1990). "'My Angel, My All, My Self': A Literal Translation of Beethoven's Letter to the Immortal Beloved". Beethoven Newsletter. Vol. 5, no. 2. p. 29.
- Beahrs, Virginia Oakley (1993). "Beethoven's Only Beloved? New Perspectives on the Love Story of the Great Composer". Music Review. Vol. 3, no. 4. pp. 183–197.
- Brandenburg, Sieghard, ed. (1996). Ludwig van Beethoven: Briefwechsel. Gesamtausgabe [Ludwig van Beethoven: Letters. Complete Edition]. Munich: Henle. (8 volumes)
- Brandenburg, Sieghard, ed. (2001). Ludwig van Beethoven, Der Brief an die Unsterbliche Geliebte. Bonn: Beethoven-Haus. (Facsimile, transcription and commentary in German, English and Japanese, new edition)
- Caeyers, Jan [in Dutch] (2012). Beethoven. Der einsame Revolutionär. Eine Biographie [Beethoven: The Lonely Revolutionary. A Biography] (in German). Munich: Beck.
- Cooper, Barry (1996). "Beethoven's Immortal Beloved and Countess Erdödy: A Case of Mistaken Identity?". Beethoven Journal. 11 (2): 18–24.
- Cooper, Barry (2000). Beethoven. Oxford: Oxford University Press.
- Czeke, Marianne [in Hungarian] (1938). Brunszvik Teréz grófno naplói és feljegyzései [Countess Therese Brunsvik's Diaries and Notes] (in Hungarian). Vol. 1. Budapest: Kötet.
- Dahlhaus, Carl (1991). Ludwig van Beethoven: Approaches to His Music. Oxford: Oxford University Press.
- Forbes, Elliot (1967). Thayer's Life of Beethoven (2nd ed.). Princeton University Press. pp. 1088–1092. ISBN 9780691027029. LCCN 66029831.
- Goldschmidt, Harry (1977). Immortal Beloved. Eine Bestandsaufnahme. Beethoven-Studien II (in German). Leipzig: Deutscher Verlag für Musik.
- Goldschmidt, Harry (1980). Um die Unsterbliche Geliebte. Ein Beethoven-Buch [About the immortal beloved. A Beethoven book] (in German). Munich: Rogner & Bernhard.
- Hevesy, André de (1910). Petites Amies de Beethoven [Beethoven's Girlfriends]. Paris: Champion.
- Kaznelson, Siegmund [in German] (1954). Beethovens Ferne und Unsterbliche Geliebte [Beethoven's Distant and Immortal Beloved]. Zurich: Standard.
- Kopitz, Klaus Martin (2001). "Antonie Brentano in Wien (1809–1812). Neue Quellen zur Problematik 'Unsterbliche Geliebte'" [Antonie Brentano in Vienna (1809–1812). New Sources to the Difficulties with the 'Immortal Beloved']. Bonner Beethoven-Studien (in German). 2: 115–146.
- La Mara (1909). Beethovens Unsterbliche Geliebte. Das Geheimnis der Gräfin Brunsvik und ihre Memoiren [Beethoven's Immortal Beloved. Countess Brunsvik's Secret and her Memoirs] (in German). Leipzig: Breitkopf & Härtel.
- La Mara (1920). Beethoven und die Brunsviks. Nach Familienpapieren aus Therese Brunsviks Nachlaß [Beethoven and the Brunsviks. According to Family Documents from Therese Brunsvik's Estate] (in German). Leipzig: Siegel.
- Ley, Stephan (1957). "Eine unsterbliche Geliebte Beethovens". Aus Beethovens Erdentagen (in German). Siegburg: Schmitt. pp. 78–85.
- Lockwood, Lewis (Summer 1997). "Film Biography as Travesty: Immortal Beloved and Beethoven". The Musical Quarterly. 81 (2): 190–198. doi:10.1093/mq/81.2.190. JSTOR 742460.
- Marek, George R. (1969). Ludwig van Beethoven. Biography of a Genius. New York: Funk & Wagnalls.
- Massin, Jean; Massin, Brigitte (1967) [1955]. Ludwig van Beethoven. Biographie. Histoire des Œvres. Essai (in French) (2nd ed.). Paris: Club Français du Livre.
- Massin, Jean; Massin, Brigitte (1970). Recherche de Beethoven (in French). Paris: Fayard.
- Meredith, William (2000). "Mortal Musings: Testing the Candidacy of Almerie Esterházy against the Antonie Brentano Theory". Beethoven Journal. 15 (1): 42–47.
- Meredith, William. Introduction. In Walden (2011), pp. ix–xxxiv.
- Newman, Ernest (1 November 1911). "A Beethoven Hoax?". The Musical Times. 52 (825): 714–717. doi:10.2307/906451. JSTOR 906451.
- Ott, Von Nikolai (7 May 2026). "War sie Beethovens „unsterbliche Geliebte"?". Frankfurter Allgemeine (in German).
- Pichler, Ernst (1994). Beethoven. Mythos und Wirklichkeit [Beethoven. Myth and Reality] (in German). Vienna: Amalthea. ISBN 978-3850023504.
- Pulkert, Oldrich (2000). "Beethoven's Unsterbliche Geliebte" [Beethoven's Immortal Beloved]. Beethoven Journal (in German). 15 (1): 2–18.
- Riezler, Walter [in German] (1962). Beethoven (8th ed.). Zurich: Atlantis. First published in 1936 (in German).
- Rolland, Romain (1928). Beethoven the Creator. The Great Creative Epochs: I. From the Eroica to the Appassionata. Translated by Ernest Newman. New York: Garden City Publishing.
- Schindler, Anton (1840). Biographie von Ludwig van Beethoven [Biography of Ludwig van Beethoven] (in German). Münster: Aschendorff.
- Schmidt-Görg, Joseph, ed. (1957). Beethoven: Dreizehn unbekannte Briefe an Josephine Gräfin Deym geb. v. Brunsvik [Beethoven: Thirteen Unknown Letters to Josephine Countess Deym née von Brunsvik] (in German). Bonn: Beethoven-Haus. (Also contains several letters by Josephine.)
- Schmidt-Görg, Joseph (1969). "Neue Schriftstücke zu Beethoven und Josephine Gräfin Deym" [New Documents about Beethoven and Josephine Countess Deym]. Beethoven-Jahrbuch 1965/68 (in German). Bonn: Beethoven-Haus. pp. 205–208.
- Skwara, Dagmar; Steblin, Rita (2007). "Ein Brief Christoph Freiherr von Stackelbergs an Josephine Brunsvik-Deym-Stackelberg" [A letter by Christoph Baron von Stackelberg to Josephine Brunsvik-Deym-Stackelberg]. Bonner Beethoven-Studien. 6: 181–187.
- Solomon, Maynard (October 1972). "New Light on Beethoven's Letter to an Unknown Woman". The Musical Quarterly. 58 (4): 572–587. doi:10.1093/mq/LVIII.4.572. JSTOR 741416.
- Solomon, Maynard (1988). "Recherche de Josephine Deym". Beethoven Essays. Cambridge, Massachusetts: Harvard University Press. pp. 157–165.
- Solomon, Maynard (1998). Beethoven (2nd ed.). New York: Schirmer. (1st ed. 1977)
- Steblin, Rita (2001). Beethoven's Immortal Beloved: Evidence against Almerie Esterházy. Abstracts of Papers Read at the Meeting of the American Musicological Society, Sixty-Seventh Annual Meeting, 15–18 November. p. 45.
- Steblin, Rita (June 2002a). "Josephine Gräfin Brunswick-Deyms Geheimnis enthüllt: Neue Ergebnisse zu ihrer Beziehung zu Beethoven" [Josephine Countess Brunsvik-Deym's secret revealed: New results about her relationship to Beethoven]. Österreichische Musikzeitschrift (in German). 57 (6): 23–31.
- Steblin, Rita (2009a). "'A dear, enchanting girl who loves me and whom I love': New Facts about Beethoven's Beloved Piano Pupil Julie Guicciardi". Bonner Beethoven-Studien. 8: 89–152.
- Steblin, Rita (2009b). "Beethovens 'Unsterbliche Geliebte': des Rätsels Lösung" [Beethoven's 'Immortal Beloved': the Riddle Solved]. Österreichische Musikzeitschrift (in German). 64 (2): 4–17 – via Austria-Forum.
- Steichen, Dana (1959). Beethoven's Beloved. New York: Doubleday.
- Sterba, Editha; Sterba, Richard (1954). Beethoven and His Nephew: a Psychoanalytic Study of Their Relationship. New York: Pantheon. In German as Ludwig van Beethoven und sein Neffe. Tragödie eines Genies. Eine psychoanalytische Studie. Munich 1964.
- Swafford, Jan (2014). Beethoven: Anguish and Triumph. Houghton Mifflin Harcourt. ISBN 978-0-618-05474-9.
- Tellenbach, Marie-Elisabeth (1983). Beethoven und seine 'Unsterbliche Geliebte' Josephine Brunswick. Ihr Schicksal und der Einfluß auf Beethovens Werk (in German). Zurich: Atlantis.
- Tellenbach, Marie-Elisabeth (1987). "Beethoven and the Countess Josephine Brunswick". The Beethoven Newsletter. 2 (3): 41–51.
- Tellenbach, Marie-Elisabeth (1988). "Künstler und Ständegesellschaft um 1800: die Rolle der Vormundschaftsgesetze in Beethovens Beziehung zu Josephine Gräfin Deym" [Artists and the Class Society in 1800: the Role of Guardianship Laws in Beethoven's Relationship to Josephine Countess Deym]. Vierteljahrschrift für Sozial- und Wirtschaftsgeschichte (in German). 2 (2): 253–263.
- Tellenbach, Marie-Elisabeth (1993–1994). "Psychoanalysis and the Historiocritical Method: On Maynard Solomon's Image of Beethoven". Beethoven Newsletter (in German). 8 (3): 84–92. And vol. 9, no. 3, pp. 119–127.
- Tellenbach, Marie-Elisabeth (1998). "Psychoanalyse und historisch-philologische Methode. Zu Maynard Solomons Beethoven- und Schubert-Deutungen" [Psychoanalysis and Historiocritical Method. On Maynard Solomon's Interpretations of Beethoven and Schubert]. Analecta Musicologica (in German). 30 (II): 661–719.
- Tellenbach, Marie-Elisabeth (October–December 1999). "Die Bedeutung des Adler-Gleichnisses in Beethovens Brief an Therese Gräfin Brunswick. Ein Beitrag zu seiner Biographie" [The Meaning of the Eagle Allegory in Beethoven's Letter to Therese Countess Brunsvik. A Contribution to his Biography]. Die Musikforschung (in German). 52 (4): 454–461. doi:10.52412/mf.1999.H4.910. JSTOR 41124596.
- Tenger, Mariam (1890). Beethoven's Unsterbliche Geliebte [Beethoven's Immortal Beloved] (in German). Bonn: Nusser.
- Thomas-San-Galli, Wolfgang A. (1909). Die "Unsterbliche Geliebte" Beethovens, Amalie Sebald: Lösung eines Vielumstrittenen Problems [Beethoven's "Immortal Beloved", Amalie Sebald: The Solution to a Much-Disputed Problem] (in German). Halle: Hendel.
- Thomas-San-Galli, Wolfgang A. (1910). Beethoven und die unsterbliche Geliebte: Amalie Sebald, Goethe, Therese Brunswik und anderes; mit Benutzung unbekannten Materials [Beethoven and the Immortal Beloved: Amalie Sebald, Goethe, Therese Brunsvik and Others; Using Unknown Documents] (in German). Munich: Wunderhorn.
- Unger, Max (1910). Auf Spuren von Beethovens Unsterblicher Geliebten [Traces of Beethoven's Immortal Beloved] (in German). Langensalza: Beyer & Söhne.
- Walden, Edward (2002). "Beethoven's 'Immortal Beloved': Arguments in Support of the Candidacy of Bettina Brentano". The Beethoven Journal. 17 (2): 54–68.
- Walden, Edward (2011). Beethoven's Immortal Beloved: Solving the Mystery. Scarecrow Press. ISBN 9780810877733. LCCN 2010039075 – via Internet Archive.
