= Massin =

Massin is a surname. Notable people with the surname include:

- Brigitte Massin (1927–2002), French musicologist and journalist
- Caroline Massin (1802–77), French seamstress and bookseller
- Dona Massin (1917–2001), Canadian choreographer
- Jean Massin (1917–1986), French historian and musicologist
- Kain Massin, Australian writer
- Robert Massin, French graphic designer
