= Jean-Victor Hocquard =

French musicologist (1910–1995)

Marie-Joseph Antoine Jean-Victor Hocquard (17 January 1910 – 21 December 1995) was a French musicologist, and a specialist of Mozart.

== Biography ==
Hocquard was born in Obernai. He graduated from Metz high school and obtained his philosophy degree in Nancy. He was successively professor at Wissembourg, Sélestat and Sarreguemines. During the war, he served on the Maginot Line. Imprisoned, released, re-imprisoned, he escaped from Metz at Christmas 1940. After the war, he was a professor of philosophy at the Grenoble, Tournon, Tanger and Altkirch high schools.

He passed a Doctorate of Arts from the University of Paris in 1956. His thesis was devoted to La pensée de Mozart partially published two years later at Éditions du Seuil, with a small book from the "Solfèges" series, reprinted since 1964 during its fourth reprint and in 1970 for the second edition, and then reprinted regularly.

He taught philosophy, but devoted most of his energy to deepening the knowledge of the Viennese musician. His name is considered to be "inseparable from Mozart's.", even more than Alfred Einstein, Jean and Brigitte Massin. These authors having dealt with other studies in Beethoven or Schubert for example, Jean-Victor Hocquard in about ten books, has invested himself entirely in Mozart.

From his thesis, he maintained throughout his various studies, the idea that Mozart's specificity resides in a thought of "intrinsically musical character", going even went so far as to consider Mozart as an initiatory guide who, through aesthetic ideals, "would make his music a work of "truth". To do this, he first dismantled the "interpretative overloads" accumulated on the person and the Mozartian work.

Hocquard died in Saint-Avertin in 1995, aged 85.

== Works ==
=== Books ===
- La pensée de Mozart, Seuil, 1958; rééd. 1991, 740 p. OCLC 164778503, 837788163. The book is dedicated in homage to Henri Davenson and in memory of Georges de Saint-Foix, biographer of Mozart.
- Mozart. Solfèges (in French). Paris: Éditions du Seuil. 1994. p. 185. ISBN 2020194554.
- Mozart; l'amour, la mort. Musiques et musiciens (in French). Paris: Archimbaud/Lattès. 1992. p. 810. ISBN 2-7096-1179-1. OCLC 264101476. Hocquard1992.
- Écrits et propos du Mozart, Éditions Séguier, 1988
- Mozart, l'unique, Séguier, 1989
- Mozart dans ses airs de concerts, Séguier, 1989
- Mozart de l'ombre à la lumière, Lattès/Archimbaud, 1993 ISBN 2709613239
- Les opéras de Mozart, Les Belles Lettres/Archimbaud, 1995, 971 p. ISBN 2-251-44053-4, BnF 35764235p Reprend les parutions suivantes :
  - Les Noces de Figaro, series Les grands opéras de Mozart, Éditions Aubier-Montaigne, 1979 ISBN 2-7007-0134-8
  - Don Giovanni, series Les grands opéras de Mozart, Aubier Montaigne, 1978
  - Cosi Fan Tutte, series Les grands opéras de Mozart, Aubier Montaigne, 1978
  - La Flûte enchantée (in French). Paris: Aubier Montaigne. 1979. p. 254. ISBN 2-7007-0154-2. OCLC 461816541. Hocquard1979.
  - La Clémence de Titus and youth operas, series Les grands opéras de Mozart, Aubier Montaigne, 1986
- L'enlèvement au sérail, series Les grands opéras de Mozart, Aubier Montaigne, 1980
- Idoménée, series Les grands opéras de Mozart, Aubier Montaigne, 1982 ISBN 2700702980
- Mozart, Musique de vérité, Les Belles Lettres/Archimbaud, 1996
- Mozart, ou, La Voix du Comique, Maisonneuve et Larose, 1999 ISBN 2-7068-1392-X

=== Recording notes ===
- Mozart, Cosi Fan Tutte – Elisabeth Schwarzkopf, Nan Merriman, Léopold Simoneau, Rolando Panerai, Lisa Otto, Sesto Bruscantini, Choir and orchestra Philharmonia, conducted by Herbert von Karajan, EMI (1981).
- Mozart, Les Noces de Figaro – Elisabeth Schwarzkopf, George London, Irmgard Seefried, Erich Kunz, Sena Jurinac, Elisabeth Höngen, Chœur de l'Opéra de Vienne, Vienna Philharmonic, conducted by Herbert von Karajan, EMI
- Mozart, Don Giovanni – Choirs and orchestra Philharmonia, conducted by Carlo Maria Giulini, EMI (1983)
- Mozart, Piano concertos 5 and 6 / Rondo K. 382 – Mitsuko Uchida, English Chamber Orchestra, conducted by Jeffrey Tate, Philips (1991)
- Mozart, Piano concertos 8 and 9 – Mitsuko Uchida, English Chamber Orchestra, conducted by Jeffrey Tate, Philips (1992)
- Mozart, piano concertos 11 and 12 – Mitsuko Uchida, English Chamber Orchestra, conducted by Jeffrey Tate, Philips (1990)
- Mozart, Piano concertos 13 and 14 – Mitsuko Uchida, English Chamber Orchestra, conducted by Jeffrey Tate, Philips 422 359-1 (1988)
- Mozart, Piano sonatas K. 282, 310 & 545 – Sviatoslav Richter, piano (Philips 1990)
- Mozart, Don Giovanni, Dramma Giocoso, K. 527 - Colin Davis, Philips 422 541-2 (1991)
- Mozart, Le Nozze Di Figaro, Opera buffa, K. 492 - BBC Symphony Orchestra, conducted by Colin Davis, Philips 422 540-2 (1991)

=== Articles and forewords ===
Jean-Victor Hocquard participated to issues of the L'Avant-scène in the 1980s and 1990s.

- "La finta giardiniera, commentaire musical et littéraire", L'Avant-scène Opéra.
- " Mithridate, commentaire musical et littéraire", L'Avant-scène Opéra, 1983.
- "L'enlèvement au Sérail, commentaire musical et littéraire", L'Avant-scène Opéra, 1991
- "Don Juan, commentaire musical et littéraire". L'Avant-scène Opéra (in French). No. 24. Paris. 1992. pp. 29–118. ISSN 0764-2873. OCLC 715992975..

Prefaces

- Le concerto pour piano dans l'œuvre mozartienne, (pp. 9–18), in Olivier Messiaen (1987). Les 22 concertos pour piano de Mozart (in French). Paris: Éditions Séguier. p. 120. ISBN 2-906284-46-7. OCLC 906580385. Messiaen1987.
- Alexander Ulybyshev, Mozart, Paris, Séguier, 1991 ISBN 2-87736-093-8, BnF 35455822h

== Bibliography ==
- Timothée Picard, "Hocquard, Jean-Victor", in Dermoncourt, Bertrand (2005). Tout Mozart; Encyclopédie de A à Z. Bouquins (in French). Paris: Éditions Robert Laffont. pp. 391–392. ISBN 2-221-10669-5. OCLC 470543766. Dermoncourt 2005.
