= Max Unger (disambiguation) =

Max Unger (born 1986) is an American football player.

Max Unger may also refer to:

- Max Unger (musicologist) (1883–1959), German musicologist
- Max Unger (sculptor) (1854–1918), German sculptor
