= Jean-Victor =

Jean-Victor is a masculine given name. Notable people with the name include:

- Jean-Victor Bertin (1767–1842), French painter
- Jean-Victor Castor (born 1962), French politician
- Jean-Victor Hocquard (1910–1995), French musicologist
- Jean-Victor Harvel Jean-Baptiste
- Jean-Victor Makengo (born 1998), French footballer
- Jean-Victor Mukama (born 1994), Canadian-Rwandan basketball player
- Jean-Victor Poncelet (1788–1867), French engineer and mathematician
- Jean-Victor Schnetz (1787–1870), French painter
- Jean-Victor Traoré, Burkinabé basketball player
