= Béatrice Massin =

Béatrice Massin is a leading specialist in Baroque dance. Her choreographic writing confronts Baroque style with contemporary dance. She's the director of the company Fêtes galantes.

The daughter of musicologists Jean and Brigitte Massin, Béatrice Massin began her career with contemporary dance. In particular, she was a performer of shows by American Susan Buirge. She met Francine Lancelot in 1983 and joined the Ris and Danceries troupe of which she was successively interpreter, assistant, collaborator and choreographer. Then began a long process of appropriation of the baroque language.

In 1993, she founded the company Fêtes galantes. Since then, Béatrice Massin has deepened this approach in her creations. (Songes, Que ma joie demeure,). She received commissions (Le roi danse, film by Gérard Corbiau) and developed an educational centre within the Atelier baroque.

== Choreographies ==
- 2012: Terpsichore (Rebel, Haendel) with the ensemble Les Talens Lyriques, under the direction of Christophe Rousset
- 2012: Fantaisies (Marais/Lully, Courbois, Nougaro/Vivaldi, Bach)
- 2011: recréation des chorégraphies de Francine Lancelot pour l'opéra Atys by Lully
- 2011: La Belle Dame (Lully, Rameau, Rebel)
- 2009: Songes (Lully, Vivaldi, Charpentier, Purcell)
- 2007: Un air de folies (Marais, Lambert, Guédron, Bataille, Boësset)
- 2006: Un voyage d'hiver (Schubert)
- 2004: Le Loup et l'Agneau, in Fables à la Fontaine de La Petite Fabrique
- 2004: La Parade baroque, on the occasion of the inauguration of the Centre national de la danse
- 2002: Que ma joie demeure (Bach)
- 1999: choreography for the feature film Le roi danse by Gérard Corbiau
