= Women of Japan and Korea =

1994 anthology of essays

Women of Japan and Korea: Continuity and Change
- Editor: Joyce Gelb; Marian Lief Palley
- Published: 1994
- Publisher: Temple University Press
- ISBN: 978-1-439-90096-3
- OCLC: 316066254

Women of Japan and Korea: Continuity and Change is an anthology of essays edited by Joyce Gelb and Marian Lief Palley. It was published in 1994 by Temple University Press as a part of their Women In The Political Economy series.

The book contains essays written by Chizuko Ueno, Kumiko Fujimura-Fanselow, Atsuko Kameda, Miho Ogino, Eiko Shinotsuka, Kimiko Kubo, Joyce Gelb, Sandra Buckley, Elizabeth Choi, Cho Kyung Won, Lisa Kim Davis, Roh Mihye, Sohn Bong Scuk, and Marian Life Palley. The essays discuss a variety of topics concerning the role of women in Japanese and Korean societies in the 20th century.
