= Gustav Parthey =

German philologist and art historian (1798–1872)

Gustav Friedrich Konstantin Parthey (27 October 1798 – 2 April 1872) was a German philologist and art historian.

== Life ==
Born in Berlin, Parthey was the son of Daniel Friedrich Parthey (1745–1822), Geheimrat in the General Finance Directorate in Berlin, and Wilhelmine Nicolai (-1803), the eldest daughter of Friedrich Nicolai. His sister, the diarist Lili (1800–1829), married the composer Bernhard Klein.

Parthey graduated from the Gymnasium zum Grauen Kloster in Berlin. Later, he studied philosophy and archaeology in Berlin and Heidelberg, where he graduated in 1820. In the following years, he traveled through France, England, Italy, Greece and the Orient. In 1824, he married Wilhelmine Mitterbacher from Karlovy Vary. From 1825, he lived again in Berlin. Due to the privileged position of his family, he never knew about material worries.

Parthey was in charge of the Nicolaische Buchhandlung, and as a private scholar, he was engaged in art and cultural history studies. He published several works.

In 1857, he became a member of the Prussian Academy of Sciences. He died in Rome.

== Publications ==
- Alexander von Humboldt[:] Vorlesungen über physikalische Geographie. Novmbr. 1827 bis April,[!] 1828. Nachgeschrieben von G. Partheÿ. [Berlin], [1827/28].
- De Philis insula commentatio (1830)
- Siciliae antiquae tabula (1834)
- Wanderungen durch Sicilien und die Levante, 2 vol. and picture boards (1834—1840)
- Das alexandrinische Museum (1837. price pamphlet crowned with a gold medal)
- Vocabularium copticolatinum et lat-copt. (1844)
- Itinerarium Antonini Augusti (1847, together with Pinder)
- Wenzel Hollar. Beschreibendes Verzeichniß seiner Kupferstiche and Kurzes Verzeichniß der Hollar'schen Kupferstiche (1853)
- Hermetis Trismegisti Poemander (1854)
- Die Bildersammlung in Rudolstadt (1857)
- Iamblichi demysteriis liber (1857)
- Ravennas und Guido (1860, together with Pinder)
- Deutscher Bildersaal (1861—1864)
- Eusebii Pamphili Onomasticon (1862, together with Larsow)
- Hieroclis synecdemus (1866)
- P. Melas de chorographia libri tres (1866)
- Mirabilia Romae (1869)
- Dicuili liber de mensura orbis terrae (1869)
- Jugenderinnerungen. Handschrift für Freunde. 2 volumes, Berlin Schade 1871; reissued as Das Haus in der Brüderstraße: Aus dem Leben einer berühmten Berliner Familie published by Gabriele Koebel; Berlin: Verl. Das Neue Berlin 1957
- Ein verfehlter und ein gelungener Besuch bei Goethe (1862, new edition 1883)
- Die Mitarbeiter an Friedrich Nicolai's Allgemeiner Deutscher Bibliothek nach ihren Namen und Zeichen in zwei Registern geordnet Hildesheim: Gerstenberg, 1973, Reprograph. Nachdr. d. Ausg. Berlin 1842.

== Sources ==
- Fritz Jonas (1887). "Parthey, Gustav Friedrich Konstantin" . Allgemeine Deutsche Biographie (in German). Vol. 25. Leipzig: Duncker & Humblot. pp. 189–191.
