= Daikichi Irokawa =

Japanese historian (1925–2021)

- Born: 23 July 1925; Chiba Prefecture, Japan
- Died: 7 September 2021 (aged 96); Yamanashi Prefecture, Japan
- Occupation: Historian
- Notable work: The Age of Hirohito: In Search of Modern Japan [Shouwa shi to Tennou]. Translated by Mikiso Hane and John Urda. New York: The Free Press, 1995.
- Spouse: Chizuko Ueno

Daikichi Irokawa (Japanese: 色川大吉, Irokawa Daikichi; 23 July 1925 – 7 September 2021) was a Japanese historian.

He was married to Chizuko Ueno.

== Biography ==
Irokawa studied at the University of Tokyo. With other historians, such as Yoshio Yasumaru, he sought to end differences in understanding of Japanese history within the country and internationally. He also sought to tout Japan's rise to prominence in the second half of the 20th century. He was inspired by the works of author Kunio Yanagita and started a daily segment titled Minshūshi, which focused on the daily life of the Japanese population and the evolution of their values.

Daikichi Irokawa died in Yamanashi Prefecture on 7 September 2021 at the age of 96.
