= Lili Parthey =

German author (1800–1829)

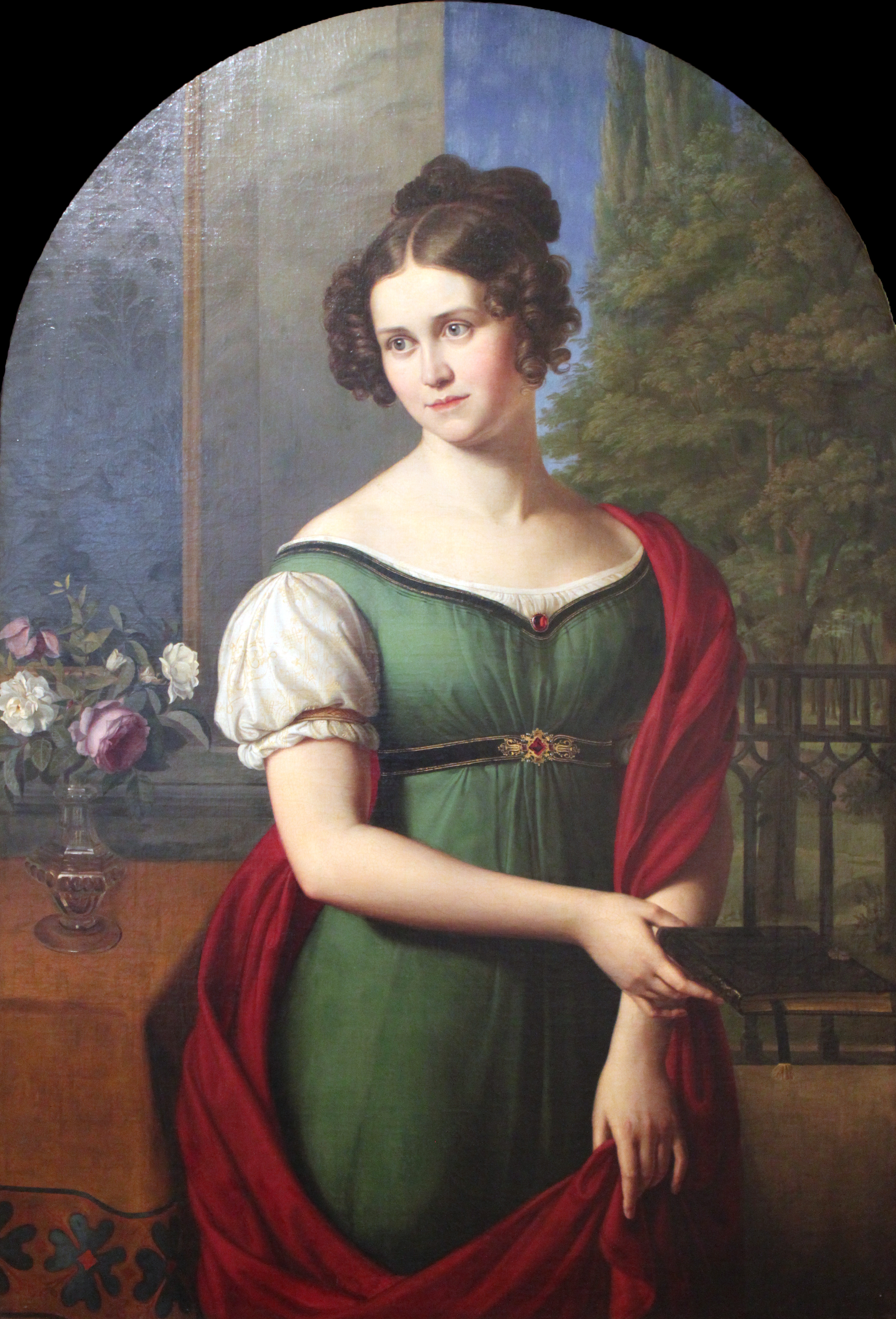
Lili Parthey by Friedrich Wilhelm Schadow

Lili Parthey (real name Elisabeth Parthey (1800–1829) was a German writer whose diaries are regarded as important historical testimonies to the Biedermeier era.

== Life ==
Parthey was a granddaughter of Friedrich Nicolai and a sister of Gustav Parthey. She received singing lessons from Amalie Sebald and married Bernhard Klein in 1825. The marriage produced a daughter. Parthey's diaries were printed in 1926 by her grandson Bernhard Lepsius. These notes give a vivid picture of the bourgeois lifestyle of their time. The diaries written between 1814 and 1829 are owned by her family. They were shown in 2007 as part of the exhibition Biedermanns Abendgemütlichkeit at the Berlin Stadtmuseum; parts of them, read by Blanche Kommerell, were available in individual rooms of the exhibition.

A portrait of Parthey from the time around 1825 by Friedrich Wilhelm Schadow shows her in the typical Biedermeier fashion with almost shoulderless dress, unadorned neck, centre parting, curly canes and chignon; On 23 July 1823, Goethe dedicated these verses to her:

Du hattest gleich mir's angethan,
Doch nun gewahr ich neues Leben;
Ein süßer Mund blickt uns gar freundlich an,
Wenn er uns einen Kuß gegeben.
