= Stephan Ley =

German music musicologist

Stephan Ley (29 November 1867 – 30 May 1964 in Bonn) was a German music educator, Beethoven researcher and musicologist.

== Life ==
Born in Bonn, Ley attended the Königliches Gymnasium in Bonn (today the Beethoven-Gymnasium Bonn and studied Classical philology, German studies and history at the Rheinische Friedrich-Wilhelms-Universität Bonn. Afterwards he worked as a grammar school teacher in Emmerich and Essen and finally became headmaster of the Städtisches Gymnasium in Boppard, current Kant-Gymnasium Boppard).There, he aroused the displeasure of the French occupying forces and was expelled. He then returned to teaching and taught at grammar schools in Wipperfürth, (Oberbergischer Kreis) and Linz am Rhein. After his retirement in 1932, he returned to his home town.

Ley published six highly acclaimed books and a total of 85 essays on Ludwig van Beethoven. For his great services to Beethoven research he was awarded the Bundesverdienstkreuz first class by the then Federal President Theodor Heuss in 1958. Ley's most important legacy is an extensive collection of the surviving pictorial evidence. Today this estate is located at the Beethoven House in Bonn.

Ley died at the age of 96 and found his final resting place at the Alter Friedhof, Bonn

== Books ==
- Beethovens Leben in authentischen Bildern und Texten. Berlin, Bruno Cassirer publishing house 1925
- Beethoven als Freund der Familie Wegeler -v. Breuning, Bonn 1927
- Beethoven. Sein Leben in Selbstzeugnissen, Briefen und Berichten. Berlin, Propyläen-Verlag, 1939; Rastatt, Pabel-Moewig, 1979, ISBN 3-8118-5039-3
- Aus Beethovens Erdentagen, Bonn, Karl Glöckner, 1948, Siegburg 1957
- Goethe und Friederike. Versuch einer kritischen Schlußbetrachtung, Bonn, Röhrscheid, 1947
- Beethovens Charakter, Bonn, Röhrscheid, 1948
- Anton Schindler, Biographie von Ludwig van Beethoven, in abridged form with corrective notes, new ed. by Stephan Ley, Bonn 1949
- Wahrheit, Zweifel und Irrtum in der Kunde von Beethovens Leben, Wiesbaden, Breitkopf & Härtel, 1955

== Essaies ==
- Beethovens spätere Beziehungen zu seiner rheinischen Heimat, in Der Türmer, Jg. 23 (1920/21), issue 11, pp. 338–341
- Unveröffentlichte Bildnisse aus Beethovens Freundeskreis, in Westermanns Monatshefte, Jg. 150=75 (1931), pp. 511 f. (Bildnisse der Familie von Johann Baptist von Puthon, von Franz von Oppersdorff And Vinzenz Hauschka)
- Ein Bild von Beethovens Unsterblicher Geliebten?, in Atlantis, Jg. 5 (1933), issue 12,. 766 f. (über eine Porträt-Miniatur aus Beethovens Nachlass)
- Von Beethovens Ärzten, in Die medizinische Welt, 1934, Nr. 21, pp. 747–752
- Ein Beethovenflügel, in Atlantis, Jg. 7 (1935), p. 703 (Hammerflügel aus dem Besitz von Beethovens Anwalt Johann Kanka)
- Beethovens Duzfreunde, in Der Türmer, Jg. 38 (1934/35), p. 371 f.
- Kleine Beethoveniana, in Neues Beethoven-Jahrbuch, Jg. 6 (1935/36), pp. 26–35
- An Beethovens letztem Krankenlager, in Die medizinische Welt, Jg. 1936, Nr. 29/30, pp. 1–14
- Beethovens spätere Beziehungen zu seiner Vaterstadt, in Bonner Geschichtsblätter, Jg. 1 (1937), pp. 97–113
- Zu Beethovens Geburtstag, in Neues Beethoven-Jahrbuch, Jg. 7 (1937), pp. 29–31
- Schloß Grätz by Troppau. Beethoven und die fürstliche Familie Lichnowsky, in Atlantis, Jg. 9 (1937), issue 1, pp. 59–64
- Beethoven und Joseph Franz von Lobkowitz, in Atlantis, Jg. 9 (1937), issue 12, pp. 748–752
- Grundsätzliches zur Beethoven-Ikonographie, in Neues Beethoven-Jahrbuch, Jg. 8 (1938), pp. 84–103
- Ein unbekanntes Beethovenbild, in Die neue Saat, Jg. 1 (1938), issue 10, p. 314 (Beethoven-Bildnis einer unbekannten Wiener Malerin von 1820 im Vergleich mit dem Bildnis von Carl Jäger von 1870)
- Beethoven als Hausfreund in einer Wiener Familie, in Velhagen & Klasings Monatshefte, Jg. 54 (1939/40), pp. 319 f.
- Beethoven und die gräfliche Familie Brunsvik, in Atlantis, Jg. 12 (1940), issue 3, pp. 101–104
- Urkundliches über Beethovens Beerdigung und erste Grabstätte, in Neues Beethoven-Jahrbuch, Jg. 10 (1942), pp. 25–35
- Anna Catharina Bethoffen, in Zeitschrift für Musik, Jg. 112 (1951), pp. 304 f.
- Beethovens Widmungen, in Zeitschrift für Musik, Jg. 113 (1952), pp. 135–138
- Zur Beethovenschen Familiengeschichte, in Zeitschrift für Musik, Jg. 113 (1952), pp. 691–693 (kritische Betrachtung einiger Anekdoten)
- Karl Holz, in Musica, Jg. 7 (1953), pp. 222–224
- Beethovens Begegnung mit Goethe, in Neff-Almanach, Vienna 1954, pp. 101
- An Beethovens Sterbebett, in Musica, Jg. 9 (1955), pp. 235–236 (Schilderung von Beethovens Tod durch seinen Bruder Johann im Vergleich mit der von Anselm Hüttenbrenner)
- Die Beethoven-Silhouette. Über die Diskussion zur Datierung des Beethoven-Bildes von Neesen, in Musica, Jg. 9 (1956), p. 363
- Historische Streiflichter. Philipp Hauschka, in Musica, Jg. 12 (1958), p. 567
- Marie Bigot, in Neue Zeitschrift für Musik, Jg. 119 (1958), pp. 510 f.
- Eine Freundin Beethovens, in Neue Zeitschrift für Musik, Jg. 119 (1958), p. 21 (über Elisabeth von Kissow, spätere Bernhard, mit Porträt)
- Aus Beethovens Notizkalender, in Neue Zeitschrift für Musik, Jg. 120 (1959), pp. 504–506
- Anna Bahr-Mildenburg über "Fidelio", in Neue Zeitschrift für Musik, Jg. 120 (1959), pp. 512–514
- Beethovens "Brieftaube", in Musica, Jg. 13 (1959), pp. 733–734 (about Nannette Streicher, whom Beethoven once called "little carrier pigeon" when she was young)
- Die Ikonographie in der Beethovenforschung, in Neue Zeitschrift für Musik, Jg. 121 (1960), pp. 413–415
- Joseph Lux. Aus Beethovens Bonner Zeit, in Neue Zeitschrift für Musik, Jg. 121 (1960), p. 415
- Beethoven in Ungarn, in Neue Zeitschrift für Musik, Jg. 126 (1965), p. 108
- Empfänger(innen) der Widmungen in alphabetischer Reihenfolge, in Neue Zeitschrift für Musik, Jg. 126 (1965), pp. 109–111
