= Amalie Sebald =

German soprano singer (1787–1846)

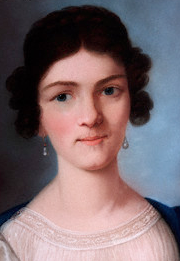
Amalie Sebald, pastel by Dora Stock (detail)

Amalie Sebald (24 August 1787 – 4 January 1846) was a German singer. In the early 20th century, she was considered a possible candidate for Beethoven's "Immortal Beloved".

== Life ==
Born in Berlin, Sebald was a daughter of the alto von Sebald, née Schwadke, and of the Justice Council Karl Christian August Sebald. Like her sister Auguste, who later married the Protestant priest Carl Ritschl, she was a soprano. In the records of the Singakademie her mother is recorded for the year 1791, her daughters for 1801 and 1802 respectively; the three ladies appeared as soloists for the first time in 1794 and 1803 and 1804 respectively.

Beethoven met Sebald in the summer of 1811 in the spa resort Teplitz; she had arrived together with the countess Elisa von der Recke. At that time, the heart of the composer was won, who met her again in Teplitz in 1812. Sebald later, on 17 October 1815, married the Berlin Justice Councillor Ludwig Krause (around 1781–1825), whom she survived. while Beethoven remained unmarried and five years later told Gianastasio de Rio that he had little hope of winning over the woman he had fallen in love with.

Sebald apparently still worked as a singing teacher after her marriage. One of her pupils was Lili Parthey, to whom she gave in 1817 a medallion with hair of Queen Luise for her birthday.

== Beethoven's love letter ==
The Beethoven scholar Wolfgang Alexander Thomas-San-Galli believed in 1910 to have found in Sebald the addressee of the famous Letter to the Immortal Beloved, a letter which Beethoven had written to an unknown person in the Bohemian spa town Teplitz on July 6–7, 1812. Thomas-San-Galli's thesis is no longer discussed today.

Sebald died in Berlin at age 58.
