= Taura =

- Municipality
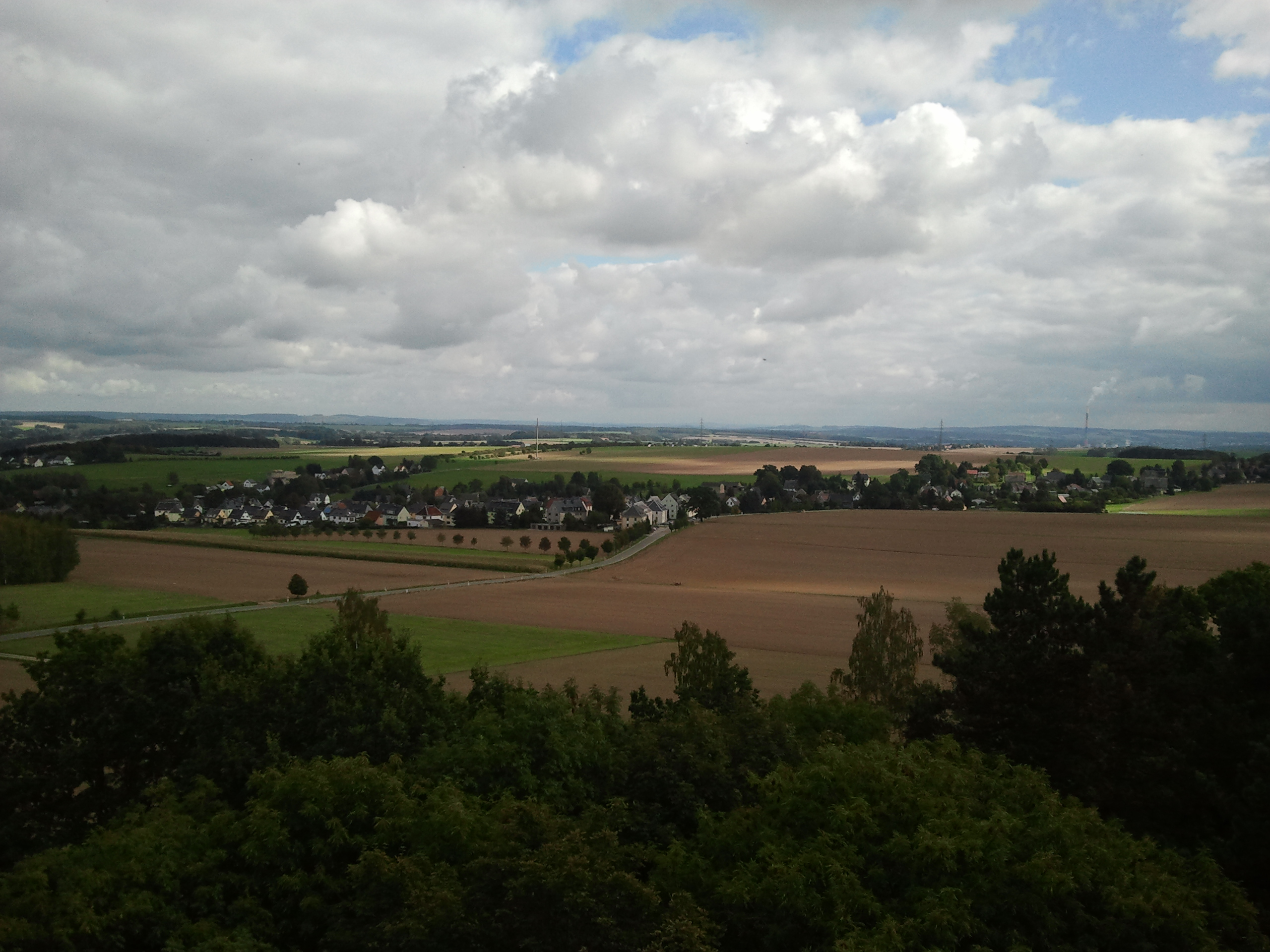
- View from the Taurastein tower on Taura

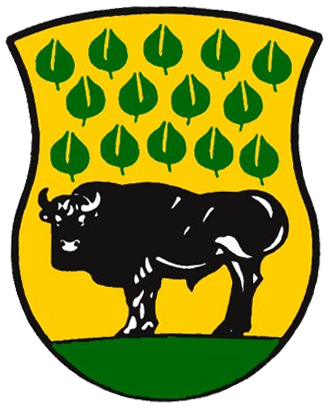
- Coat of arms

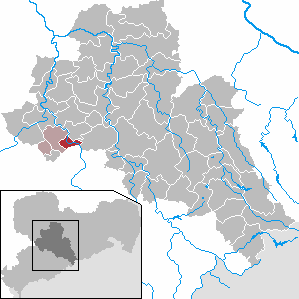
- Location of Taura within Mittelsachsen district
- Interactive map of Taura
- Location within Germany Location within Saxony
- Coordinates: 50°55′6″N 12°50′27″E
- Country: Germany
- State: Saxony
- District: Mittelsachsen
- Subdivisions: 3

Government
  - Mayor (2022–29): Robert Haslinger (CDU)

Area
  - Total: 11.11 km^{2} (4.29 sq mi)
- Elevation: 304 m (997 ft)

Population (2025-12-31)
  - Total: 2,251
  - Density: 202.6/km^{2} (524.8/sq mi)
- Time zone: UTC+01:00 (CET)
  - Summer (DST): UTC+02:00 (CEST)
- Postal codes: 09249
- Dialling codes: 03724
- Vehicle registration: FG
- Website: www.gemeinde-taura.de

Taura (German pronunciation: [ˈtaʊʁa]) is a municipality in the district of Mittelsachsen, in Saxony, Germany.

== Personalities ==
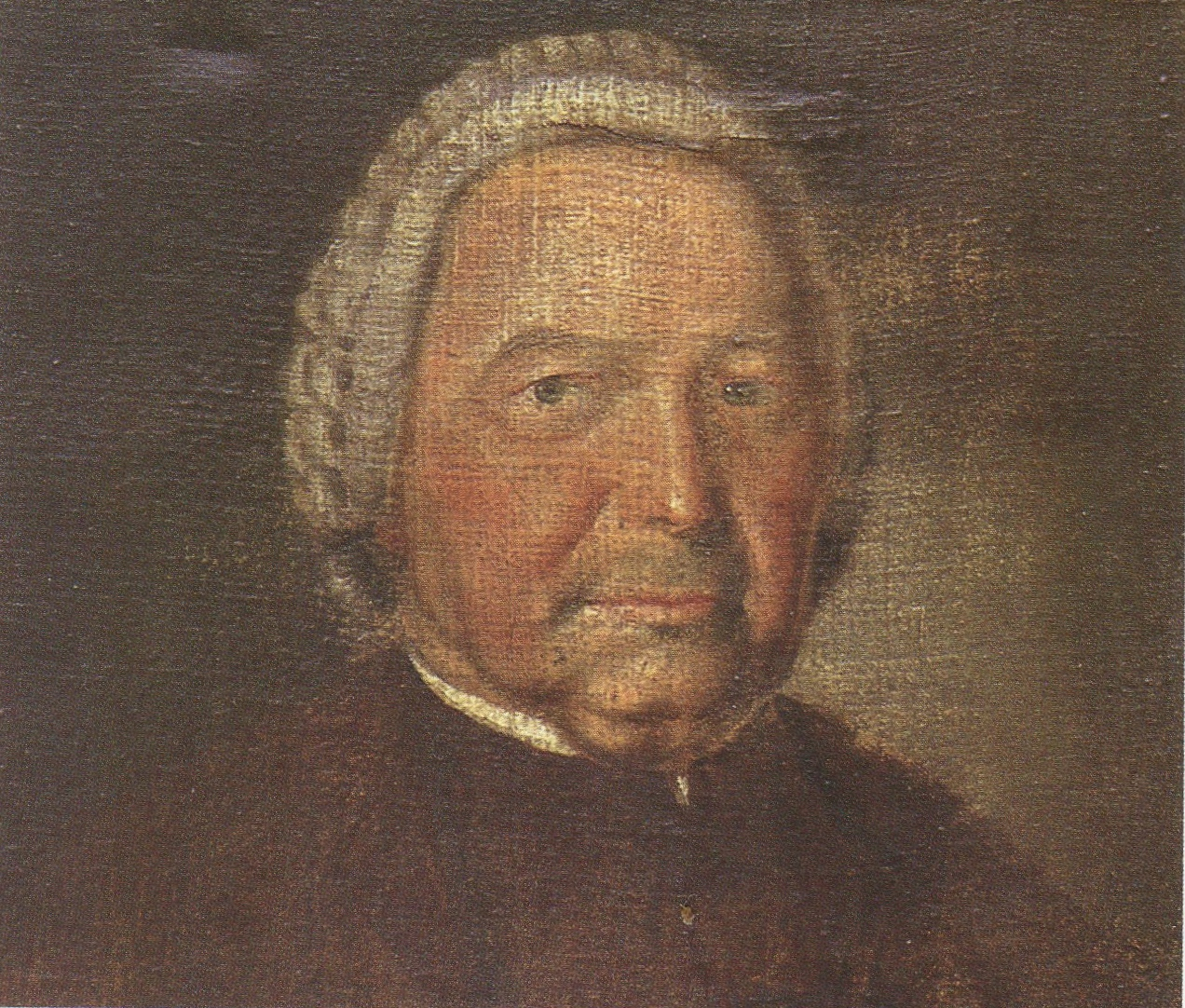
Johann Esche

- Johann Esche (1682–1752), born in today's local part of Köthensdorf, German stocking manufacturer
- Max Unger (1883–1959), musicologist, Beethoven researcher
