= Wolfgang Alexander Thomas-San-Galli =

German musicologist, music critic, violist and music writer

Wolfgang Alexander Thomas-San-Galli (real name Wolfgang Alexander Thomas; 18 September 1874 – 17 June 1918) was a German musicologist, music critic, violist and music writer.

== Life ==
Thomas-San-Galli was born in Badenweiler the eldest son of doctor Hermann Julius Thomas and his wife Jacobine née Simons. In 1898 he received his doctorate in law from the University of Freiburg and married the concert pianist and accompanist Helene née Bertoldy (1861–1938) from Saint Petersburg.

He had already enjoyed violin lessons as a child and studied violin and viola with a pupil of Hans Sitt. From 1899 to 1903 he headed the Hochschule für Musik Freiburg and founded the Süddeutsche Streichquartett there, to which he belonged as a violist until 1908. That same year, he moved to Cologne, where he became editor and writer of the Rheinische Musik- und Theaterzeitung.

Thomas-San-Galli took part in the First World War as a soldier. He died in 1918 in Baden-Baden at the age of 43 from the consequences of his war injuries.

== Publications ==
- Ein Beitrag zur Lehre von der Idealkonkurrenz. Speyer & Kärner, Freiburg 1898. (Dissertation)
- Johannes Brahms. Eine musikpsychologische Studie in fünf Variationen. Heitz und Mündel, Strassburg 1905
- Aufgaben des Musikschriftstellers. In Musikalisches Wochenblatt, year 40, Nr. 38 date 16 December 1909, p. 545 f. (Read inline)
- Briefe. Mit einem Bilde Beethovens und einem Faksimile. Hendel, Halle 1910
- Beethoven und die Unsterbliche Geliebte: Amalie Sebald, Goethe, Teréz Brunszvik und anderes, Munich 1910
- Ludwig van Beethoven. Piper, Munich 1913
- Mona Lisa. Eine Novellen-Suite, Op. 12. Costenoble, Jena 1913
- Beethovens Briefe an geliebte Frauen. Xenien-Verlag, Leipzig 1913
- Musikalische Essays. Mazurka Chopins. Hendel, Halle 1913
- Musik und Kultur. Betrachtungen und Gespräche für Laien, Musikfreunde und Künstler. with a foreword and the picture of the author. Hendel, Halle 1913
- Goethe. Die Pyramide seines Daseins. Hertz, Munich 1914
- Diplomaten vor!. Hertz, Munich 1915
