= Bernhard Klein =

German composer (1793–1832)

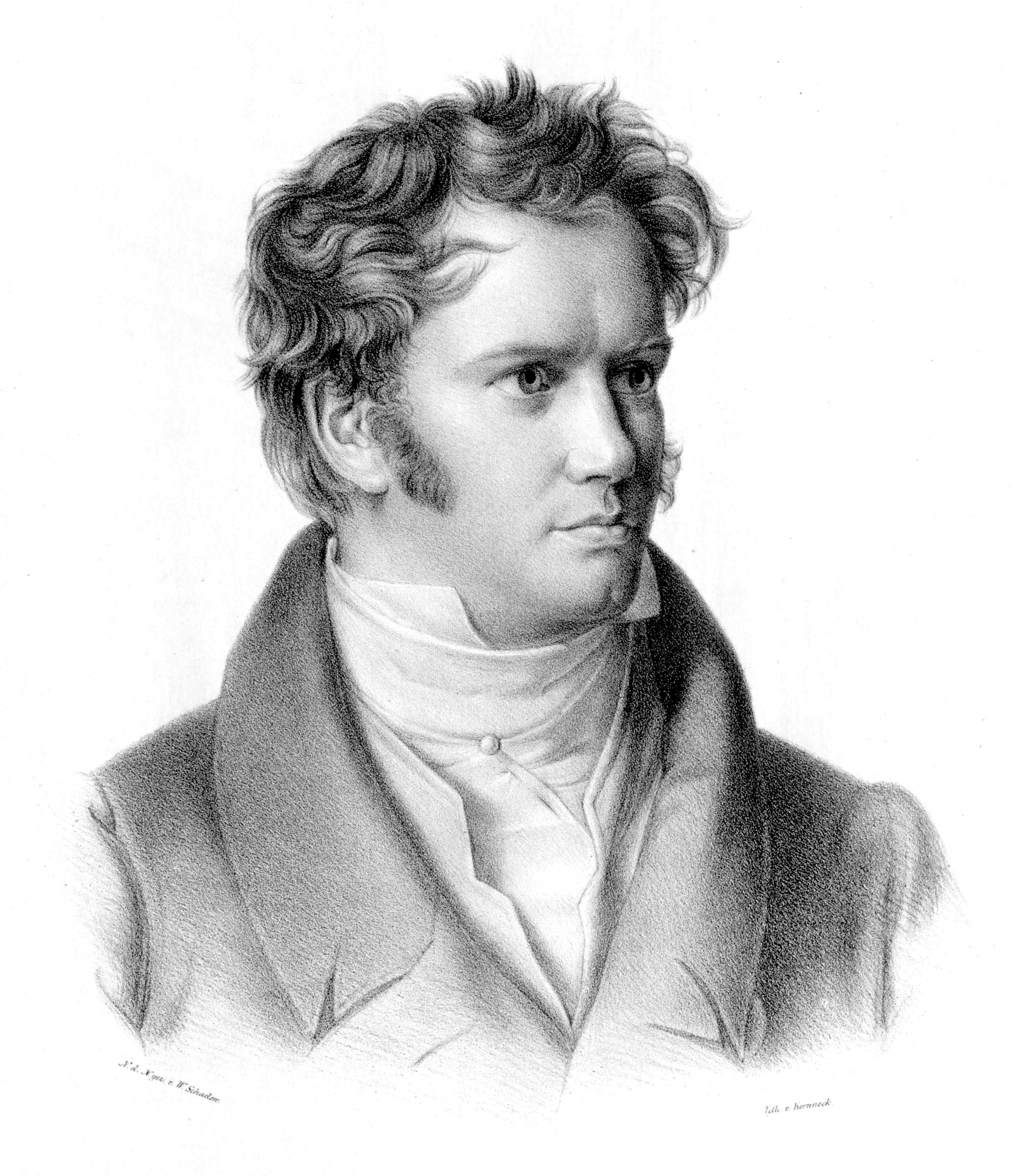
Bernhard Klein

Bernhard Joseph Klein (6 March 1793 – 9 September 1832) was a German composer.

== Life ==
Klein was born in Cologne. He married Lili Parthey (1800–1829) who was the sister of Gustav Parthey (1798–1872) and the granddaughter of Friedrich Nicolai (1733–1811). Their daughter, Elisabeth Klein (1828–1899), married Egyptologist Carl Richard Lepsius (1810–1883) on 5 July 1846.

In 1812, he went to Paris and became a pupil of Luigi Cherubini.

After leaving the Paris Conservatory, Klein became the director of music at Cologne Cathedral. In 1819, at the request of Carl Friedrich Zelter, he came to Berlin, where he spent the rest of his life. In 1820, he became professor of composition at the Royal Institute for Church Music as well as music director at the University of Berlin. Together with his friend, music critic Ludwig Rellstab, he founded the Second Berlin Song Board (Zweite Berliner Liedertafel).

Klein composed oratorios, a mass, a Magnificat, a cantata, psalms, hymns, and motets, along with three operas, songs, and piano pieces. His conservative style of composition was influenced by Anton Friedrich Justus Thibaut.

== Works ==
- Worte des Glaubens, cantata (1817)
- Hiob, cantata (1820) (a setting of the story of Job)
- Dido (after Ludwig Rellstab), opera (1823)
- Ariadne, opera (1824)
- Irene, opera
- Jephtha, oratorio (1828, Cologne)
- David, oratorio (1830, Halle)
- Athalia, oratorio
- piano sonatas
- songs
