= Antonie Brentano =

Austrian philanthropist (1780–1869)

- Johanna Antonie Josefa Edle von Birkenstock
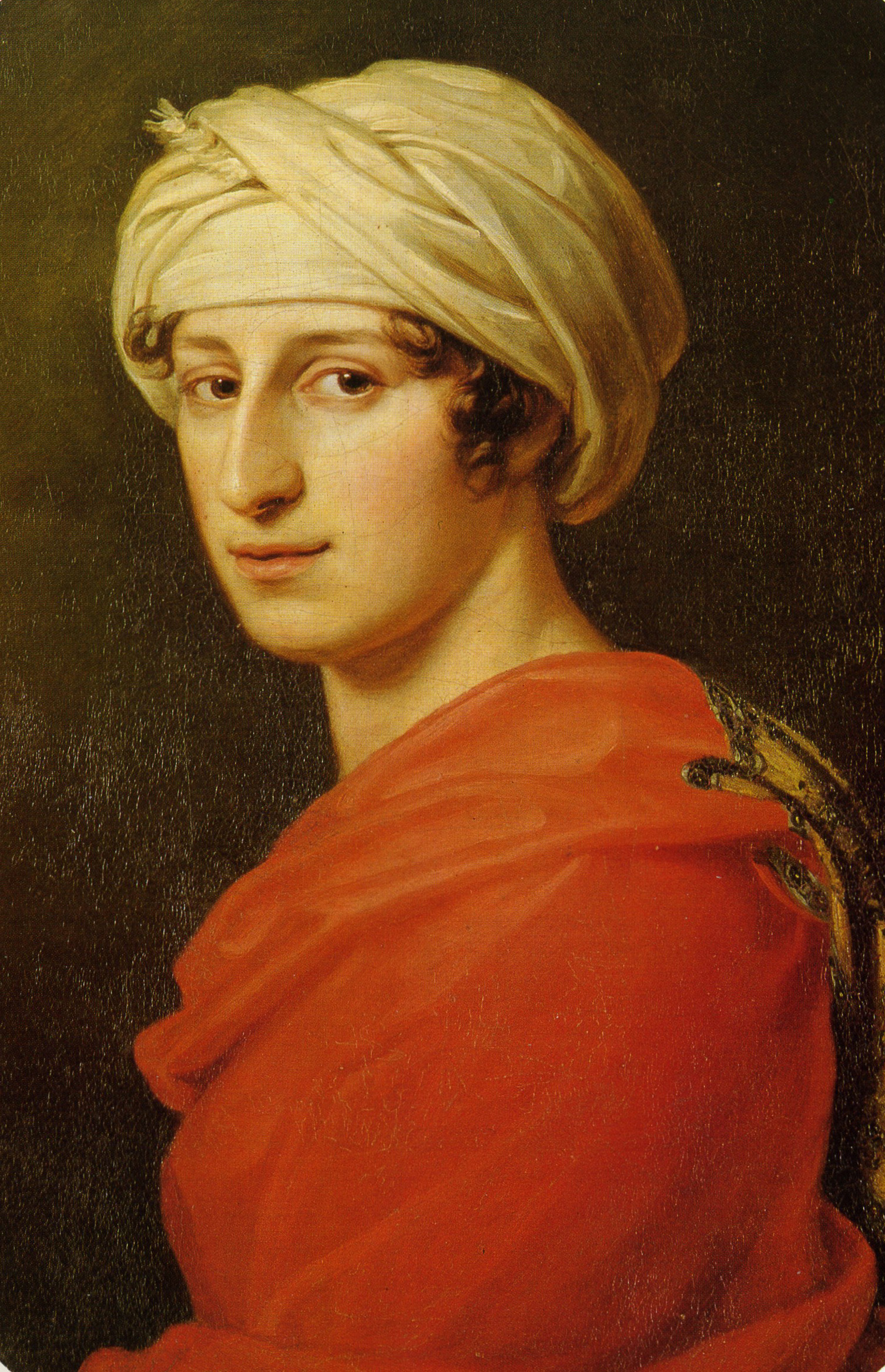
- Born: May 28, 1780; Vienna, Holy Roman Empire
- Died: May 12, 1869 (aged 88); Frankfurt, North German Confederation
- Occupations: Philanthropist, art collector, arts patron
- Notable work: Dedicatee of the Diabelli Variations
- Spouse: Franz Brentano (m. 1798; died 1844)
- Children: 6
- Relatives: Clemens Brentano (half-brother-in-law); Bettina von Arnim (half-sister-in-law)

Antonie Brentano (28 May 1780 – 12 May 1869 in Frankfurt), born Johanna Antonie Josefa Edle von Birkenstock and known as Toni, was an Austrian philanthropist, art collector, arts patron, and a close friend of famous German composer Ludwig van Beethoven, being the dedicatee of his "Diabelli" variations.

== Early life ==
Antonie was born 28 May 1780 in Vienna. She was the daughter of Austrian diplomat, educational reformer, and art collector Johann Melchior Edler von Birkenstock and his wife Carolina Josefa von Hay (born 1755 in Fulnek/Böhmen; died 18 May 1788 in Vienna). She had three siblings, two of whom died in infancy:

- Hugo Konrad Gottfried von Birkenstock (15 December 1778 in Vienna – 10 April 1825 in Ybbs an der Donau). Lieutenant in the k.u.k. Weydenfeld-Infantry
- Konstantin Viktor von Birkenstock (born and died 1782 in Frankfurt)
- Johann Eduard Valentin von Birkenstock (born and died 1784 in Frankfurt)

Her father was an Imperial advisor to Empress Maria Theresa and the reformist Emperor Joseph II. Through his wife, he was the brother-in-law of Joseph von Sonnenfels, the dedicatee of Beethoven's Piano Sonata No. 15 in D major, Op. 28 (1801). Antonie von Birkenstock Brentano's mother was the sister of the Reformbischofs of Königgrätz Jan Leopold Ritter von Hay (1735–1794).

From 1782 until approximately 1784, the Birkenstock family lived in Frankfurt-am-Main, where Antonie's brothers Konstantin Viktor and Johann Eduard von Birkenstock were born and died in infancy. It is possible that Johann Melchior von Birkenstock became acquainted with the Brentano family at this time. In Vienna, the family lived in a forty-room mansion in the city's central Landstraße district, located at Erdberggasse Nr. 98 (today, Erdbergstraße 19), which housed a large library and Birkenstock's sizable art collection.

Ten days before her eighth birthday, Antonie lost her mother to an epidemic and was sent to school at the Ursuline convent in Pressburg.

== Marriage and children ==
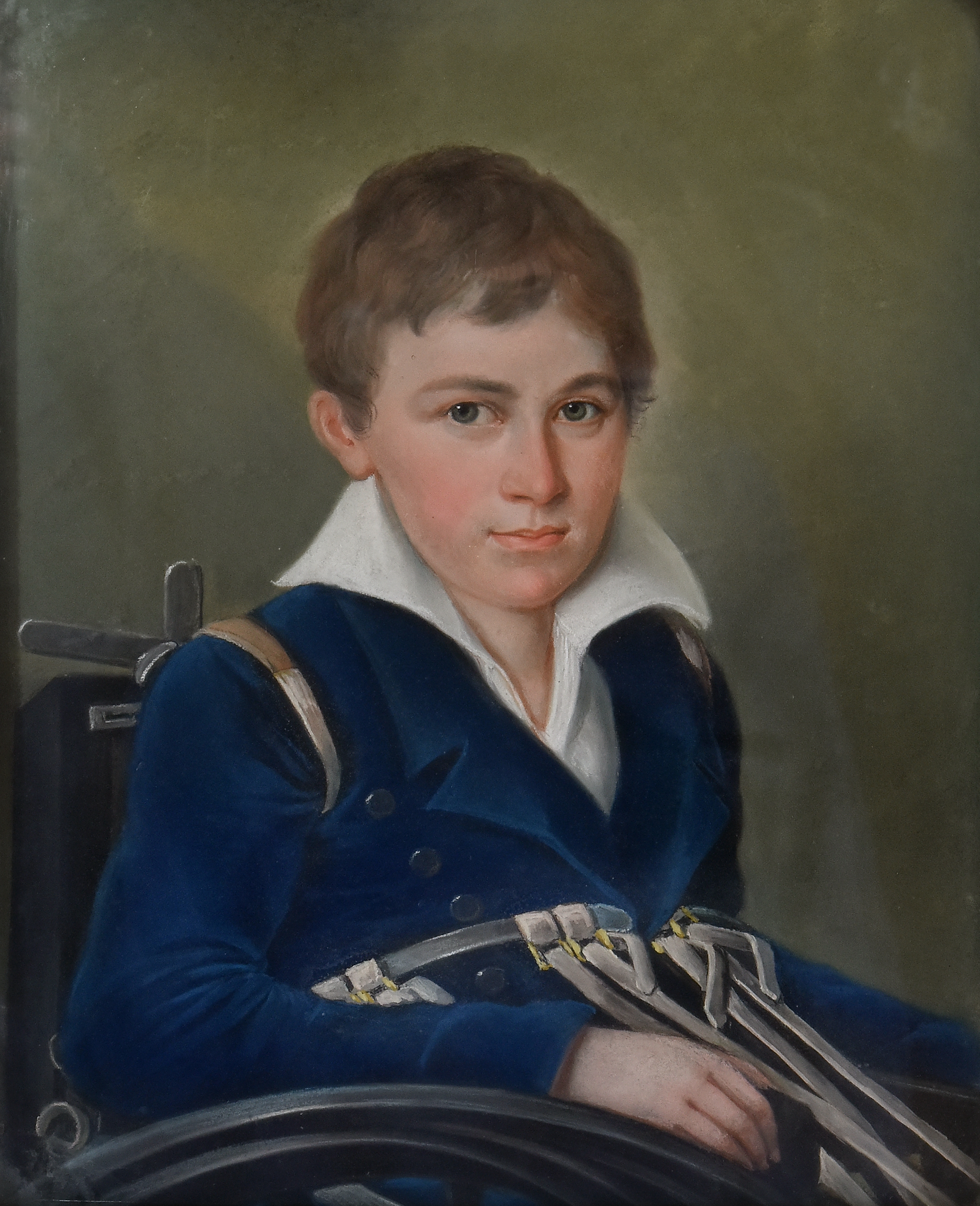
Karl Brentano (1827), Oestrich-Winkel, Brentano-Haus

In September 1797, prosperous Frankfurt merchant Franz Brentano (1765–1844), the half-brother of authors Clemens Brentano (1778–1842) and Bettina von Arnim (1785–1859), sent his half-sister, Sophie Brentano (1776–1800), and his stepmother Friederike Brentano née von Rottenhof (1771–1817) to Vienna to meet Antonie. Franz had met Antonie briefly at the end of 1796 or beginning of 1797. After a long negotiation with Antonie's father, Franz and Antonie were wed on 23 July 1798 at St. Stephen's Cathedral in Vienna. Eight days after the wedding, the pair departed Vienna for Frankfurt-am-Main. Antonie and Franz had six children:

- Mathilde (3 July 1799 in Frankfurt am Main – 5 April 1800).
- Georg Franz Melchior (13 January 1801 in Frankfurt am Main – 1 March 1853), married on 5 January 1835 to Lilla Pfeifer (1813–1868).
- Maximiliane Euphrosine Kunigunde (8 November 1802 in Frankfurt am Main – 1 September 1861, Brunnen, Switzerland), on 30 December 1825 married Friedrich Landolin Karl von Blittersdorf (1792–1861). Beethoven composed a piano, violin and cello trio for her. "Beethoven never submitted Allegretto for Piano Trio for publication, perhaps because it was too casual in nature. He wrote it for his 10-year-old piano student, Maxe Brentano, and affixed a note, “for my little friend to encourage her in piano playing. LvB.”".
- Josefa Ludovica (29 June 1804 in Frankfurt am Main – 2 February 1875), on 28 May 1832 married Anton Theodor Brentano-Tozza (1809–1895).
- Franziska Elisabeth, known as Fanny (26 June 1806 in Frankfurt am Main – 16 October 1837), in 1836 married Johann Baptist Josef Reuss.
- Karl Josef (8 March 1813 in Frankfurt am Main – 18 May 1850).

== Vienna years ==
In August 1809, Antonie returned to Vienna to care for her ailing father, who died on October 30, 1809. After his death, Antonie remained in Vienna for three years to sort out her father's art collection and supervise its sale. Franz Brentano established a branch of his business in Vienna and joined his wife there. Bettina von Arnim, in her epistolary novel Goethe's Correspondence with a Child, describes Birkenstock's collection as follows:

I am much pleased with the old tower, from whence I overlook the whole Prater: trees on trees of majestic appearance, delightful green lawns. Here I live in the house of the deceased Birkenstock, in the midst of two thousand engravings, as many drawings, as many hundred antique urns, and Etrurian lamps, marble vases, antique remains of hands and feet, pictures, Chinese dresses, coins, collections of minerals, sea-insects, telescopes, countless maps, plans of ancient buried kingdoms and cities, skilfully carved sticks, valuable documents, and lastly the sword of the Emperor Carolus. All these surround us in gay confusion, and are just about being brought into order, so there is nothing to be touched or understood, and with the chesnut-alley in full blossom, and the rushing Danube, which bears us over on his back, there is no enduring the Gallery of Art.

The Brentano family made the acquaintance of Beethoven and Goethe at this time, in 1810 and 1812 respectively, Beethoven subsequently becoming a close family friend and a regular visitor to the Brentano home while the family was still in Vienna. He later dedicated one of his most accomplished works, the Diabelli Variations, to Antonie and two more, including his antepenultimate piano sonata, to her daughter Maximiliane.

== Immortal Beloved candidacy ==
American musicologist Maynard Solomon, in his 1977 biography of Beethoven, set forth numerous arguments favouring Antonie Brentano as the intended recipient of Beethoven's "Immortal Beloved" letter, listing the known facts supporting his belief that Brentano and Beethoven had become intimately involved by the summer of 1812. Despite success in leading many Beethoven scholars to accept his hypothesis as fact, Solomon wrote, "clearly, there is no possibility of absolute certainty here, and the researcher should not exclude even the most remote possibilities". Leaving open the possibility that contradictory evidence may surface in the future, Solomon, refuted by some scholars and still supported by others, maintains that after 42 years of intervening research the most likely candidate for Beethoven's Immortal Beloved remains Antonie Brentano. His detractors are content to note that Antonie was not only married but most likely pregnant at the time of the alleged 1812 Karlsbad assignation, and Beethoven, by his own admission, faithful friend of herself, her children and her husband, was an entirely honourable man.

== Charitable work ==
After the Brentanos returned from Vienna, Franz was elected a senator of Frankfurt (1816). Antonie was known as "the mother of the poor" for her work in raising funds for the poor and disenfranchised citizens of Frankfurt. She founded and ran several charities. Antonie was also one of the foremost cultural figures in Frankfurt and helped to establish a salon society there. The Brentanos entertained notables such as Goethe and the brothers Grimm both at their house in Frankfurt and at their summer home, Winkel near Rheingau.
