= Max Unger (musicologist) =

German musicologist (1883–1959)

- Born: Max Ernst Unger; 28 May 1883; Taura, Germany
- Died: 1 December 1959 (aged 76) Zurich, Switzerland
- Occupation: Musicologist

Max Ernst Unger (28 May 1883, in Taura – 1 December 1959, in Zurich) was a German musicologist. Although he wrote on a variety of subjects, he is chiefly known for his extensive research and writings on the life and works of Ludwig van Beethoven.

Unger, the son of a factory owner, studied from 1904 to 1906 at the Leipzig Conservatory, and entered the University of Leipzig in 1908. There, he studied under Heinrich Zöllner and Hugo Riemann. In 1911, he completed a doctorate with a dissertation on Muzio Clementi. After serving in World War I, he worked as editor of the New Journal of Music in 1919 and 1920. From 1932 to 1939, he lived in Zurich and catalogued the valuable Beethoven collection of local industrialist Hans Conrad Bodmer, which was later bequeathed to the Beethoven House in Bonn. In 1939, Unger moved to Volterra in Pisa. While he had been denounced by the Militant League for German Culture as a "musical Bolshevik" in 1935, he cooperated with the Reichsleiter Rosenberg Taskforce and the Amt Rosenberg beginning in 1942 or 1943. His job was to catalogue sheet music seized from Jews in occupied Paris, including the personal collection of escaped harpsichordist Wanda Landowska.

Unger returned from Italy to Zurich in 1957. He is considered one of the most important Beethoven scholars of the first half of the 20th century. His books and papers were acquired by the Beethoven House in 1961.

== Books ==
- Auf Spuren von Beethovens „Unsterblicher Geliebten“, Langensalza 1910
- Muzio Clementis Leben, Langensalza 1913
- Beethoven über eine Gesamtausgabe seiner Werke, Bonn 1920
- Ludwig van Beethoven und seine Verleger S. A. Steiner und Tobias Haslinger in Wien, Ad. Mart. Schlesinger in Berlin, Berlin und Wien 1921
- Beethovens Handschrift, Bonn 1926
- Eine Schweizer Beethoven-Sammlung. Katalog, Zürich 1939 (Katalog der Sammlung H. C. Bodmer)
- Ein Faustopernplan Beethovens und Goethes, Regensburg 1952
