= Bertrand Dermoncourt =

French journalist, publisher and author

- Born: March 1970 (age 56); France
- Occupations: Journalist, publisher, author
- Employer(s): L'Express, Radio Classique
- Known for: Books on music, classical music criticism

Bertrand Dermoncourt (born March 1970) is a French journalist, publisher and author of books on music, including classical music. He started in rock fanzines during the 1980s. In 1998, he co-founded the magazine Classica of which he was from the beginning Editorial Director Musical critic of the weekly l'Express, he also directs a collection of biographies of composers published by Actes Sud He is also a member of the editorial board of the collection "Bouquins" at Éditions Robert Laffont and member of the Prix Pelléas jury.

At the request of the President of the Republic, Emmanuel Macron, he was artistic advisor for the "Année Debussy" on the occasion of the celebrations marking the centenary of the composer's death in 2018. After leaving Classica, he was appointed director of music at Radio Classique in March 2018.

== Publications ==
=== Books ===
- 1997: David Bowie, Prélude et Fugue, Paris, 128 pages
- 1998: Depeche mode, Prélude et Fugue, Paris, 128 pages
- 1998: The Cure, Prélude et Fugue, Paris, 128 pages
- 2001: The Cure de A à Z, L'Étudiant, Paris, 126 pages
- 2002: Sonic Youth de A à Z , Prélude et Fugue, Paris, 128 pages
- 2005: Depeche Mode de A à Z , Éditions L'Express, Paris, 111 pages
- 2005: David Bowie de A à Z, Éditions L'Express, Paris, 119 pages
- 2005: The Cure de A à Z, Éditions L'Express, Paris, 117 pages
- 2006: Tout Mozart : Encyclopédie de A à Z (direction), series "Bouquins", Robert Laffont, Paris, 1093 pages
- 2006: Dimitri Chostakovitch, Actes Sud, Arles, 238 pages
- 2009: Tout Bach (direction), Robert Laffont, series "Bouquins", Paris, 895 pages
- 2012: L’Univers de l’opéra. Œuvres, scènes, compositeurs, interprètes (direction), Robert Laffont, collection "Bouquins", Paris, 1214 pages
- 2012: La Discothèque idéale de la musique classique (direction), Actes Sud, Arles, 284 pages
- 2013: Igor Stravinski, Actes Sud, Arles, 205 pages
- 2013: Tout Verdi, Robert Laffont, series "Bouquins", Paris, 850 pages
- 2013: La Discothèque idéale de l’opéra (direction), Actes Sud, Arles, 308 pages
- 2014: Michka Assayas, Le Nouveau Dictionnaire du rock (collaboration), Robert Laffont, series "Bouquins", Paris, 3792 pages
- 2014: Berlin, Histoire, promenades, anthologie et dictionnaire (collaboration), Robert Laffont, series "Bouquins", Paris, 1152 pages
- 2015: Stefan Zweig, Le retour de Gustav Mahler (introduction), Actes Sud, Arles, 58 pages
- 2015: David Bowie, foreword by Éric Dahan, Actes Sud, coll. « Rocks » dirigée par Bertrand Burgalat, Arles, 2015
- 2018: Valery Gergiev, Rencontre. Entretiens, Actes Sud, 2018
