= James K. Wright =

James Kenneth Wright
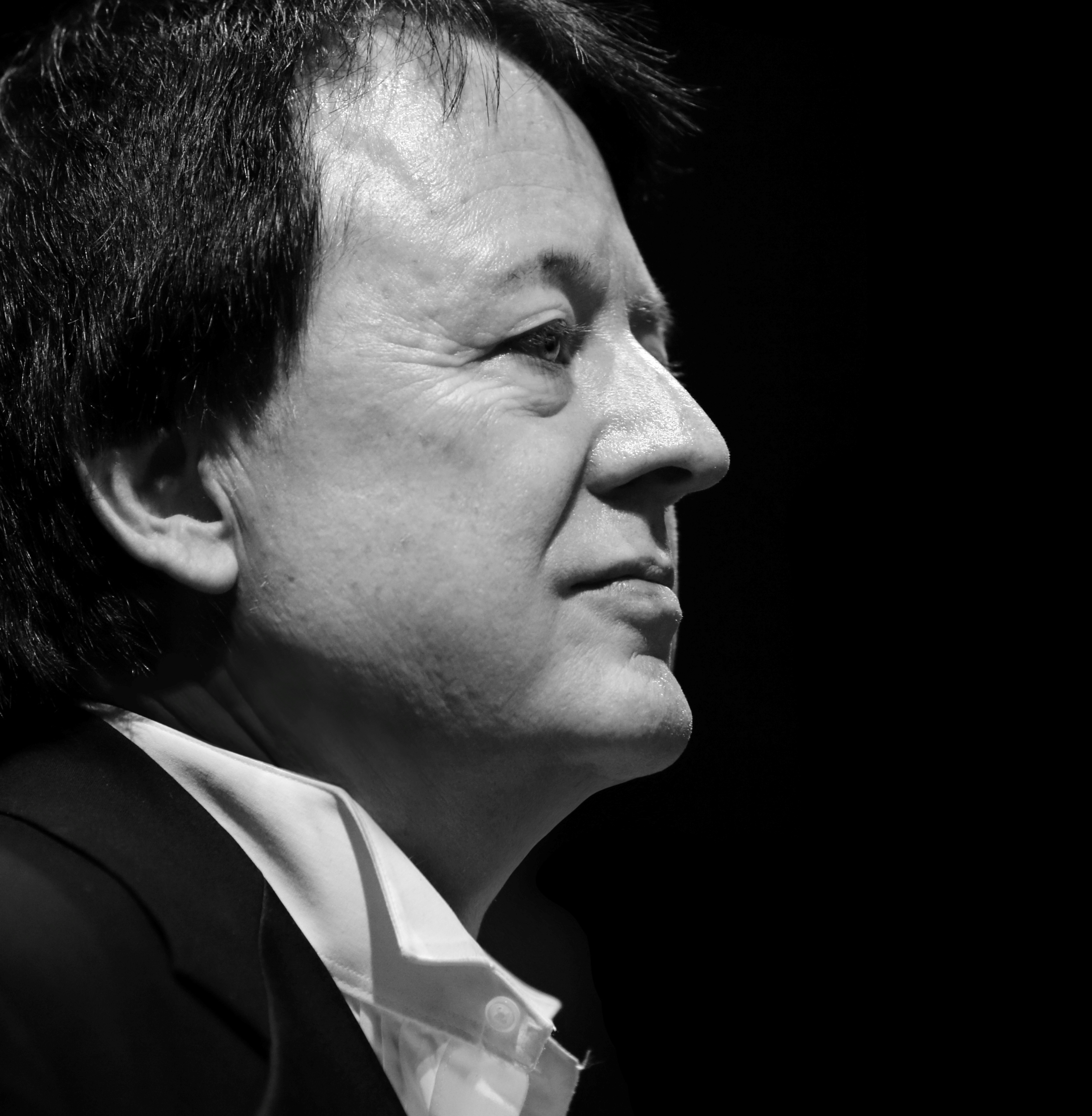
- Occupations: Musicologist, pianist, academic, and author

Academic background
- Education: Wilfrid Laurier University; McGill University; University of Western Ontario

Academic work
- Institutions: Carleton University

James Kenneth Wright (born 1959) is a Canadian composer, pianist, and musicologist. His notable compositions include works such as Letters to the Immortal Beloved, and his award-winning books include Schoenberg, Wittgenstein and the Vienna Circle, They Shot, He Scored: the Life and Music of Eldon Rathburn, Monstrosity, Identity and Music: Mediating Uncanny Creatures from Frankenstein to Videogames, and Music and Antifascism: Cultures of Resistance in Europe and North America.

== Education ==
Wright completed a Bachelor of Music degree at Wilfrid Laurier University in 1981, followed by a Master of Arts in Music Theory at McGill University in 1987. In 2002, he earned a PhD in Music Theory from McGill University, where he received a Governor General's gold medal for his research and scholarly record.

== Career ==
Wright is a professor in the School for Studies in Art & Culture and the College of the Humanities at Carleton University. He served as Supervisor of Performance Studies from 2007 to 2018 and subsequently as Supervisor of Graduate Studies from 2020 to 2023. Additionally, he held a visiting appointment as Louis Applebaum Distinguished Visiting professor of composition at the University of Toronto in 2020. In June 2025, James Wright was awarded the King Charles III Coronation medal for his contribution to music in Canada.

== Compositions and books ==
Wright's music has been published by Warner-Chappell Music in Miami, Leslie Music in Oakville, Cypress Music in Vancouver, Rhythmic Trident Music in Vancouver, Fairbank Music in Victoria, Frederick Harris Music in Toronto, Counterpoint Music in Toronto, and Da Capo Music in Manchester, UK.

Wright's nine-movement choral cycle, A Gallery of Song: Spirit of the Land, features settings of youth poetry inspired by the works of artists from Canada's Group of Seven. The piece premiered in 2003 at the McMichael Canadian Art Gallery in Kleinburg, Ontario.

Wright's 2012 composition, Letters to the Immortal Beloved, is a chamber art song cycle inspired by love letters penned by Ludwig van Beethoven to his mysterious Immortal Beloved, whose identity remains a topic of debate among musicologists. Written during a composer residency at the Banff Centre for the Arts, the work was premiered by Canadian mezzo-soprano Julie Nesrallah and the Gryphon Trio at the Ottawa International Chamber Music Festival on July 27, 2012. Reviewing a March 30, 2024 performance by Luxembourg baritone, David John Pike, Edinburgh critic Bryan Bannatyne-Scott wrote, "We are indebted to James Wright for giving musical life to the sentiments expressed in Beethoven's letters, and his three-song cycle was a revelation. In a modern idiom but grounded in harmony, and very well set for the baritone voice, the songs, with important parts for all three instruments in the trio, took us into the heart of Beethoven’s essentially hopeless longing".

In 2013, Wright's choral work To Young Canadians, featured words excerpted from a letter titled Letter to Canadians, written by Canadian politician Jack Layton on his deathbed. It was premiered at the presentation of the Ottawa Peace Award to Layton's widow, Olivia Chow.

In 2022, Wright's String Quartet No. 1, a four-movement work inspired by the beauty of Lake Scattergood in the Outaouais region of southwestern Québec, was recorded by the Andara String Quartet of Montreal. About the quartet, CBC Music wrote "James K. Wright's lush, tuneful String Quartet No. 1, titled 'Ellen at Scattergood,' is one of the year's best discoveries".

Wright is also the author or editor of numerous scholarly books. His 2006 Schoenberg, Wittgenstein and the Vienna Circle examines parallels between Arnold Schoenberg's harmonic and aesthetic theories and Ludwig Wittgenstein's early philosophical ideas, particularly from the Tractatus Logico-Philosophicus, suggesting shared epistemological foundations. His 2009 book Schoenberg's Chamber Music, Schoenberg's World, co-edited by Alan Gillmor, presents a scholarly collection of essays commemorating Schoenberg's landmark Second String Quartet, exploring its historical, theoretical, and biographical contexts, alongside its influence on subsequent composers internationally. In 2019, he authored They Shot, He Scored: The Life and Music of Eldon Rathburn, a biography and critical analysis of the work of Canadian composer Eldon Rathburn. The book highlights Rathburn's career as a composer for the National Film Board, his IMAX film scores, and his orchestral and chamber compositions. Reviewing the book, Michael Brendan Baker wrote that "the central argument of the monograph, that Rathburn is perhaps the most important composer in the history of the NFB and Canadian film at large, is presented with nuance and insight and thus represents a critical addition to our understanding of film music in Canada." In 2022, his book Monstrosity, Identity and Music: Mediating Uncanny Creatures from Frankenstein to Videogames, co-edited by Alexis Luko, presented essays examining depictions of the monstrous in music, film, television, and videogames, through a variety of contemporary analytical lenses.

== Awards and honors ==
- 2002 – Governor General's gold medal, McGill University
- 2006 – (Finalist) Lewis Lockwood Award (for Schoenberg, Wittgenstein and the Vienna Circle), American Musicological Society
- 2020 – Louis Applebaum Distinguished Visiting professor of composition, University of Toronto
- 2024 – Visiting Scholar, University of Edinburgh
- 2025 – King Charles III Coronation medal (for contribution to music in Canada)

== Bibliography ==
=== Books ===
- Schoenberg, Wittgenstein and the Vienna Circle (2007) ISBN 9783039112876
- Schoenberg's Chamber Music, Schoenberg's World (2009) ISBN 9781576471302
- They Shot, He Scored: The Life and Music of Eldon Rathburn (2019) ISBN 9780773557154
- Monstrosity, Identity and Music: Mediating Uncanny Creatures from Frankenstein to Videogames (2022) ISBN 9781501380044
- Music and Antifascism: Cultures of Resistance in Europe and North America (London: Routledge, forthcoming 2026).

=== Selected compositions ===
- A Gallery of Song: Spirit of the Land, 9 movements, for SSAA (2003)
- Three Canadian Landscapes, for SSA (2004)
- Briefe an die Unsterbliche Geliebte/Letters to the Immortal Beloved, for soprano (or baritone) and piano trio (2012)
- String Quartet No. 1: "Ellen at Scattergood" (2023)
- To Young Canadians, for soloist and SATB (2013)
- Quilled Sonnets, for soprano and piano (2025): I."Quilled Sonnets" II."Lost Sonnet" III. "Snowed-In Sonnet

=== Selected articles ===
- "Schoenberg’s Philosophical Musings and Influences." In Alexander Carpenter (ed.), Schoenberg in Context. Cambridge University Press (2025), 298–307.
- "Twelve-tone Terror: Representing Horror and Monstrosity in Dodecaphonic Film Music." In Alexis Luko and James K. Wright (eds.), Monstrosity, Identity, and Music: Mediating Uncanny Creatures from Frankenstein to Videogames. Bloomsbury Academic (2022), 150–71.
- "Schoenberg’s Liszt: ‘Greater than an Artist: A Prophet!’" In Michael Saffle (ed.), Liszt's Legacies. Pendragon Press (2014), 29–41.
- "Mahler’s Contrapuntal Complexities and Berg’s Opus 6: ‘One of the Most Remarkable Noises Ever Imagined.’" In Elizabeth Kappel (ed.), Das Klagende Lied: Synthese, Innovation, Kompositorische Rezeption. Universal (2013): 214–33.
- "Schoenberg, Mozart, and the Viennese Spieltrieb." In Hartmut Krones and Christian Meyer (eds.), Mozart und Schönberg: Wiener Klassik und Wiener Schule. Bolau Verlag Vienna (2012), 177–93.
- "Building a New World: Gustav Mahler and Arnold Schoenberg (c. 1905 – 1908)." In Peter Revers and Eliszabeth Kappel (eds.), Text and Context: Mahler's Eighth Symphony. Universal (2011), 183–201.
- "‘The Story of My Life’: Weinzweig's Divertimento Series." In John Beckwith and Brian Cherney (eds.), Weinzweig: Essays on His Life & Music. Wilfrid Laurier University Press (2010), 225–67.
- "Glenn Gould and Second Vienna School Reception in the Soviet Union." In James K. Wright and Alan M. Gillmor (eds.), Schoenberg's Chamber Music, Schoenberg's World. Pendragon Press (2009), 237–58.
- "‘Air of Another Planet’: Glenn Gould's Modernist Mission in Moscow and Leningrad," Glenn Gould Magazine, 13/1 (Spring 2008), 38–44.
- "Commentary on Asynchronous Preparation of Tonally Fused Intervals in Polyphonic Music," Empirical Musicology Review 3/2 (2008), 68–72.
- "Auditory Stream Segregation and the Control of Dissonance in Polyphonic Music," Contemporary Music Review 2/1 (1987), 63–92.
