= Chizuko Ueno =

Japanese sociologist and feminist (born 1948)

- 上野 千鶴子
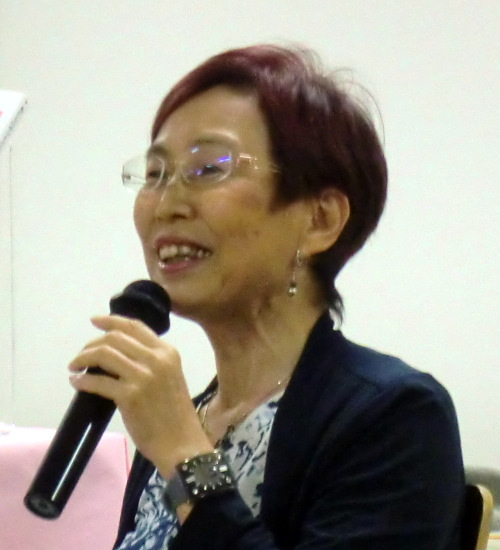
- Ueno in 2014
- Born: 12 July 1948 (age 78); Toyama Prefecture
- Education: Kyoto University
- Occupation: Professor of sociology
- Known for: Japanese feminism

Chizuko Ueno (上野 千鶴子, Ueno Chizuko; born 12 July 1948) is a Japanese sociologist and Japan's "best-known feminist". Her work covers sociological issues including semiotics, capitalism, and feminism in Japan. Ueno is known for the quality, polarizing nature, and accessibility of her work. She was married to Daikichi Irokawa.

== Early life and education ==
Ueno was raised as a Christian, which she notes as being "very unusual" because only 1% of the Japanese population is Christian. Her father was a physician. In an interview with The Japan Times, she describes her father as "a complete sexist" who had extremely high expectations of her two brothers but only considered his daughter as a "pet girl", which allowed her the "freedom to do whatever I wanted to do". The marriage between Ueno's parents was unhappy, and her mother repeatedly fretted about the difficulty that divorce would bring should she pursue it. Ueno would later describe monogamous marriage institutions as "the root of all evil". Ueno studied sociology at Kyoto University, where she participated in the Zengakuren student protests of the 1960s. Ueno has stated that during her time as a student, she faced sexual discrimination.

== Academic career ==
Chizuko Ueno has spent her entire career advocating gender equality in Japanese society by researching diverse issues of gender and contributing to the establishment of gender studies as an acknowledged field of research in Japan.

In 1982, Ueno authored The Study of the 'Sexy Girl' (セクシィ・ギャルの大研究) and Reading the Housewife Debates (主婦論争を読む), texts that would be referred to as "The Flagbearers of 1980's Feminism". Her work investigated the relationship between the "Women's Lib" (ウーマン・リブ) movement of the 1960s and the Women's Liberation Movement (女性解放運動) of the 1970s. The primary perspective of these works was the application of structuralist and semiotic theory to sociology in order to investigate gender-centric mechanisms in society. This public debate coincided with the prominence of other scholars such as Asada Akira, Nakazawa Shin'ichi, and Yomota Inuhiko, a period known as the New Academicism Boom (ニュー・アカデミズム・ブーム).

After dropping out of her doctoral courses, Ueno worked in a marketing systems think tank and produced many works on the debate over consumption and society.

From 1979 to 1989, she was a Lecturer and later Associate Professor at the Heian Women's College. She was an Associate Professor and Professor at Kyoto Seika University in the Department of Humanities from 1989 to 1994. In 1993, after being rejected by many other universities as a strident feminist scholar, she received an invitation from the University of Tokyo.

She is a special guest professor at the Graduate School of Core Ethics and Frontier Sciences at Ritsumeikan University and a professor emeritus at the University of Tokyo. She retired from this position in order to take the role of Chief Director of the Women's Action Network (WAN), an organization designed to connect and introduce feminists from different backgrounds. The Women's Action Network website hosts news, essays, popular media reviews, and promotes certain merchandise.

In 1994, Ueno received the Suntory Arts and Sciences award for her work, The Rise and Fall of the Modern Family.

Ueno is on the editorial board of the Journal of Women, Politics & Policy.

== Scholarship and views ==
Ueno's research field includes feminist theory, family sociology, and women's history. She is best known for her contribution to gender studies in Japan. As a public intellectual, she played a central role in creating the field of gender studies in Japanese academia.

Ueno is a trenchant critic of postwar revisionism and criticizes the whitewashing of Japanese history, which she claims attempts to justify its colonialism, wartime atrocities, and racism both before and after World War II. In particular, she has defended the compensation of Korean comfort women who were forced into prostitution by the Empire of Japan. She is also a staunch advocate of global women's reproductive rights, and a critic of monogamous marriage institutions.

Ueno often discusses the semiotics and accessibility of feminism, claiming that feminist discussion in Japanese can frequently lack the language needed to make its concepts readily understandable and approachable. Moreover, Ueno has engaged in publicly provocative expressions and publications in order to invite dialogue on otherwise less-discussed feminist issues in the Japanese media, for which she has received both praise and criticism from other feminists. In the mid-1980s, Ueno was also involved in a public debate with Japanese eco-feminist Aoki Yayoi.

Her work has argued that a key component of Marxist-Feminist thought is the recognition that sexism is an inherent, inseparable aspect of capitalist economies, and that sexism in the modern family does not owe its origins to pre-modern traditions, but rather is an acute product of post-industrial economic structure.

Ueno has stressed the need for an accessible legacy of feminist thought.

== Controversy in South Korea ==
Ueno’s position on the criminal prosecution of Park Yu-ha drew criticism in South Korea. Park had been prosecuted over her book Comfort Women of the Japanese Empire: Colonial Rule and Battle over Memory, which discussed the memory and representation of Korean comfort women. Ueno opposed Park’s criminal punishment on freedom of expression and academic freedom grounds. At a 2016 debate at the University of Tokyo, Ueno’s comments about the Park case were challenged by Zainichi Korean scholar Yang Ching-ja, who said the complaint had been brought by former comfort women rather than by the South Korean judiciary alone.

== Surge of popularity in China ==
In 2023, Ueno's work gained sudden prominence in China after a video of her 2019 matriculation speech at the University of Tokyo went viral. Consequently, Chinese translations of Ueno's books gained popularity. As of April 2023, Ueno's books had reportedly sold more than a million copies in China, of which 200,000 copies were sold in January and February alone. Her book Ofuku shokan: Genkai kara hajimaru (Correspondences: Starting at the Edge) was selected as book of the year on Chinese book review platform Douban. In 2024, she was included on the Time magazine's annual list of 100 most influential people and cited as a "surprising superstar" in China.

== Selected publications ==
- The Modern Family in Japan: Its Rise and Fall. Victoria, Australia: Trans Pacific Press. 2009. ISBN 978-1876843625. (first published in Japanese in 1994)
- Ueno, Chizuko; Sand, Jordan (1999). "The Politics of Memory: Nation, Individual and Self". History & Memory. 11 (2): 129–152. doi:10.1353/ham.2005.0001. S2CID 1765052. (translated from Japanese by Jordan Sand)
- Nationalism and Gender. Victoria, Australia: Trans Pacific Press. 2004. ISBN 978-1876843595.
- Patriarchy System and Capitalism. Taipei, Taiwan: China Times Publishing Co. 1997. ISBN 9789571323169.
- 上野先生、フェミニズムについてゼロから教えてください! (published in Japanese on January 12, 2020). ISBN 978-4479393320.
