= Aoki Yayoi =

Japanese scholar and eco-feminist critic (1927–2009)

- 青木やよい
- Born: June 13, 1927
- Died: November 25, 2009 (aged 82)
- Occupation(s): Japanese scholar and eco-feminist

Aoki Yayoi (June 13, 1927 – November 25, 2009) was a Japanese scholar and eco-feminist critic. She wrote extensively on sexuality, abortion rights, reproductive technologies, and women in the workplace. While she accepted short-term positions at various universities and community colleges, Aoki maintained a non-institutional status.

== Personal ==
Aoki was from Shizuoka Prefecture and graduated from what is now known as Tokyo University of Pharmacy and Life Sciences (東京薬科大学). While going home from school one day around the end of World War II, the air raid siren went off while she was on a crowded train and she had a revelation about how war is not just about destroying things, but also about wasting each persons life, which connected to her way of life after the war. She was married to Kitazawa Masakuni (北沢方邦) and her real name is Kitazawa Yayoi (北沢弥生).

== Scholarship ==
One of Aoki's most notable publications was "Feminism and Imperialism", which she wrote in the 1980s. The work analyzed the relationship between the Japanese imperial institution and the patriarchal Japanese household, and showed how this relationship was central to the construction of the modern Japanese nation-state. She argued that the model systemically marginalized women, and raised the question of whether such a model was still legitimate in contemporary Japan and, if so, what its consequences were for the family unit and women. She was a proponent of Takamure Itsue's bosei-ism or spirit of motherhood, which made her ecofeminism seem like Japanese 1970s nationalist feminism. She advised Japanese young women to question femininity or onnarashisa and masculinity or otokorashisa in her work The Myth of Femaleness. She was also particularly interested in how Japanese honorifics influence power politics.

In addition to Aoki's interest in Japanese society, she was committed to a feminist analysis of artistic productions, including two works on Beethoven as well as research on indigenous peoples, such as the Hopi in Southwestern U.S.

=== Claims, Aims and Criticisms ===
One of Aoki Yayoi's criticisms was, at the root of modern civilization only the "masculine principle" exists, furthermore the "feminine principle," that should be balanced with it, doesn't exist and consequently the masculine principle is being distorted. The ultimate women's liberation that Aoki Yayoi aimed for was none other than a fundamental revolution from the most basic levels of society focused on changing the distorted masculine principle, and society as a whole having been founded upon it, and realizing a feminine principle underlying society and an equality of the sexes predicated on a masculine principle that derives from that feminine principle. She seems to be anti-Western in many of her works by criticizing Western civilization, but she also uses a misreading of Western theories to support her ecofeminist arguments.

=== Controversy with Chizuko Ueno ===
In the mid 1980s, Aoki was involved in a public debate with Chizuko Ueno, where Aoki's feminist principles were accused of being essentialist for romanticizing the problematic construct of the "feminine". Ueno eventually wrote Can Women Save the Earth?, critiquing Aoki's analyses, but this criticism was based on an oversimplification of terms taken out of context. Because of Aoki's use of the term "feminine principle" and her emphasis on reintroducing caring and nurturing values into contemporary society, her work has also been criticized for being too emotionally charged, maternalist, or utopian. This debate became the last in the Japanese ecofeminist sphere.

=== Women and technology ===
Aoki's analyses regarding technologies were situated within the global geopolitical context. Aoki was particularly concerned about the impact of new technologies (especially reproductive technologies) on third world women, and argued that one must consider a variety of contexts within which women develop a relationship to technology. For example, Aoki cited that a Japanese woman may have a liberating or empowering experience with reproductive technologies while a South Indian woman's experience with the same technology might be involuntary.

Aoki was also wary of contemporary society's growing dependence on technology, since she believed it led to political apathy, war, and nuclear disasters. She argued that we should be developing a more self-reliant system of existence.

In 1990, Aoki, alongside several women's rights groups, opposed a government proposal to restrict Japan's abortion law as she argued that the policy would infringe on a woman's right to control her body.

=== Women and the future ===
While Aoki recognized that the economic independence of woman is crucial to the feminist movement, she argued that "if all it achieves is the right of passage of woman into existing male social structures and practices, I don't know that we have achieved very much". She cited alternative value systems like the ecological feminism of Denmark or the Green Party in West Germany as other routes that feminism should explore.

== See also ==
- Ecofeminism
- Feminism in Japan
- Chizuko Ueno
