= Brigitte Massin =

French musicologist and journalist

- Born: 21 July 1927
- Died: 5 December 2002 (aged 75)
- Occupations: Musicologist; Journalist

Brigitte Massin (21 July 1927 – 5 December 2002) was a French musicologist and journalist.

With her husband Jean Massin, she published numerous works on music. Brigitte Massin is the mother of Béatrice Massin, a specialist of Baroque dance.

== Biography ==
Massin has written extensive biographical works on classical and romantic composers. She specialized in Franz Schubert, Wolfgang Amadeus Mozart and Beethoven.

== Publications ==
=== In collaboration with Jean Massin ===
- 1955(2nd edition: 1967): Ludwig van Beethoven. Bibliothèque des grands musiciens. Paris: Fayard. p. 845. ISBN 978-2213003481.
- 1959: Wolfgang Amadeus Mozart. Les indispensables de la musique. Paris: Fayard. 1967. p. 1293. ISBN 978-2213003092.
- 1970: Recherche de Beethoven. Paris: Fayard. p. 379.
- 1997: Histoire de la musique; de Monteverdi à Varése 1600/1945 (3 tomes). Paris: Messidor. p. 945.
- 1987: Histoire de la musique occidentale. Les indispensables de la musique. Paris: Fayard. 1987. pp. 1312. ISBN 978-2213020327.

=== Other works ===
- 1977: Franz Schubert. Les indispensables de la musique. Paris: Fayard. 1991. p. 1005. ISBN 978-2213025032.
- 1989: Olivier Messiaen; Une poétique du merveilleux. De la musique. Paris: Alinéa. 1989. p. 23. ISBN 978-2904631771.
- 1991: Mozart; le bonheur de l'Europe. Paris: Plon. 1991. p. 190. ISBN 978-2-259-02459-4.
- 1991: Guide des opéras de Mozart. Paris: Fayard. 1991. p. 1005. ISBN 978-2213025032.
- 1999: Les Joachim; Une famille de musiciens. Paris: Fayard. 1999. p. 449. ISBN 978-2213604183.
