= Jean Massin =

French historian and musicologist

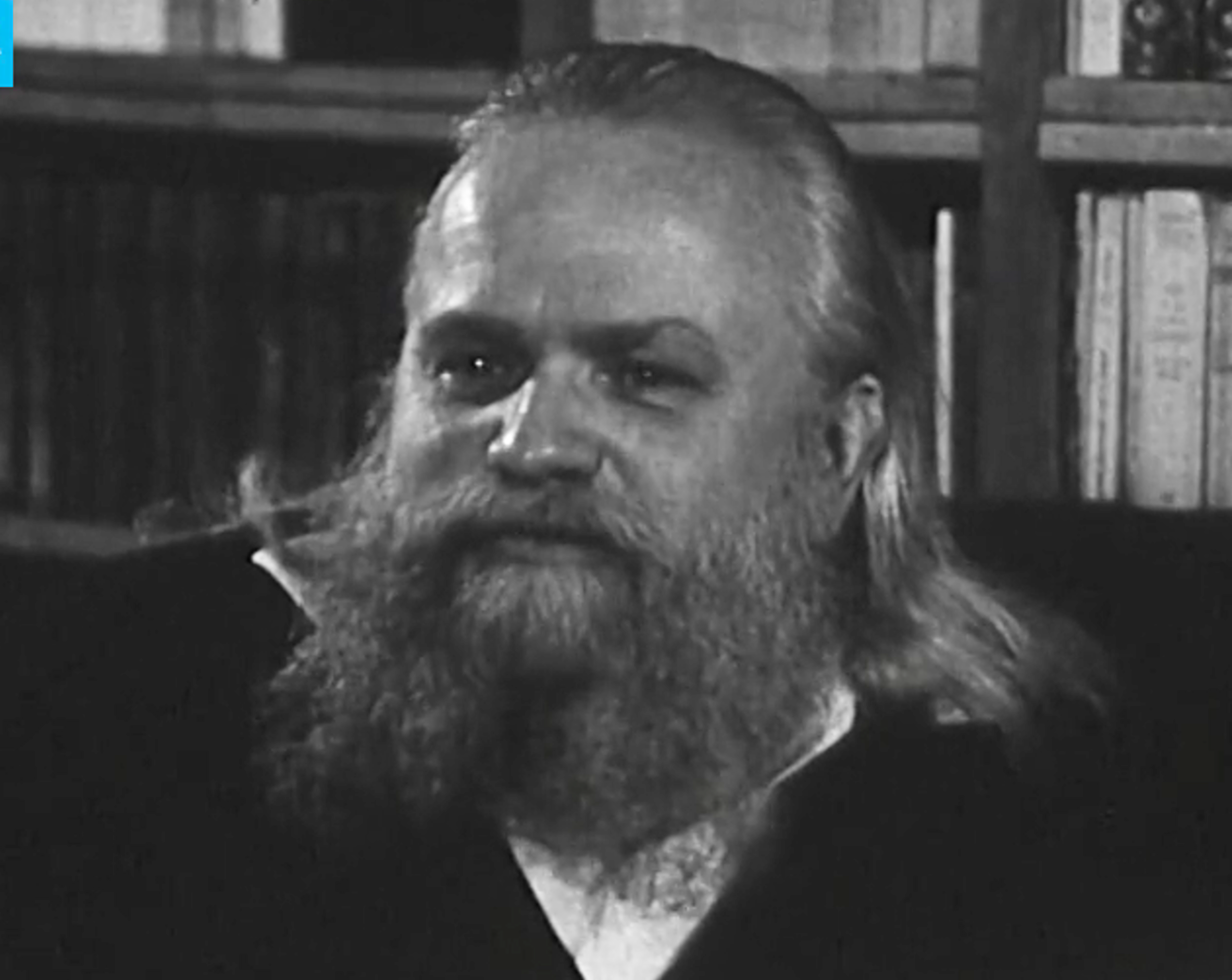
Image of Jean Massin

Jean Massin (1917–1986) was a French historian and musicologist. With his wife Brigitte Massin, he is the author of numerous books of history and musicology.

== Biography ==
After studying at the seminary in Rome, Massin remained a Catholic priest until 1952, despite questions about tradition. He was close to Paul Claudel, the theologians Yves Congar and Pierre-André Liégé, vicar of the Parish of Saint Séverin. Then he became a critic and musicographer. In collaboration with his wife Brigitte Massin née Toulemonde (1927-2002), he published in the 1950s two reference works of musicology, Ludwig van Beethoven and Wolfgang Amadeus Mozart. He thus contributed considerably to the renewal of the historiographical approach of composers in France. These two studies were followed by Recherche de Beethoven (1969) and, under the joint direction of Jean and Brigitte, Histoire de la musique occidentale (1977). A television program of 14 March 1970 highlighted the originality of the couple's approach to the approach of romantic music, the psychology of the composer and the history of his time.

Director of the series Portraits de l'Histoire at the "Club français du livre", Jean Massin wrote various historical works among which "Robespierre", "Marat" and "Don Juan: mythe littéraire et musical".

Finally, as a man of letters, Jean Massin directed a voluminous chronological edition of the complete works of Victor Hugo, in 36 volumes which is still a reference for the Hugollian work.

== Works ==
- 1937: Cantate triomphale du Christ roi, Desclée De Brouwer, 107 pages.
- 1939: Poèmes de la compassion de Jésus-Christ, Éditions franciscaines, 79 pages.
- 1944: Baudelaire devant la douleur, Sequana, 187 pages.
- 1944: Le Feu de la Saint-Jean, Éditions Julliard, 128 pages.
- 1945: Baudelaire « entre Dieu et Satan », Julliard, 1945, 338 pages.
- 1949–1952: Le Rire et la Croix, Julliard, 2 vol. (294 and 255 pages).
- 1955: Ludwig van Beethoven, Club français du livre, 855 pages.
- 1955: Écrits autobiographiques. Jean-Jacques Rousseau. Confessions. Choix de lettres. Histoire du précédent écrit et Rêveries du promeneur solitaire (introduction and notes by Jean Massin), Club français du livre, XXVI-1188 pages.
- 1956: Robespierre, Club français du livre, 322 pages.
- 1959: Wolfgang Amadeus Mozart, Club français du livre, XXII-1276 pages.
- 1960: Marat. Portraits de l'histoire. Paris: Club français du livre. p. 306. JSTOR 41925650. new edition : Marat. Aix-en-Provence: Alinéa. 1988. p. 308. ISBN 2-904631-58-5.
- 1963: Almanach de la Révolution française, Club français du livre, 339 pages.
- 1965: Almanach du Premier Empire: du neuf thermidor à Waterloo, Club français du livre, 371 pages
- 1970: Recherche de Beethoven, Fayard, 379 pages.
- 1980: Victor Hugo - Œuvres complètes, (dir.) Massin, Paris, Club français du livre, 36 tomes.
- 1971: Cadres et repères pour l'histoire napoléonienne (in collaboration with Élisabeth Brisson), Club français du livre, 592 pages.
- 1977–1978 Histoire de la musique: de Monteverdi à Varèse 1600-1945, Messidor, 3 vol. (315, 315 and 315 pages).
- 1991: Histoire de la musique occidentale, Collection : Musique, Fayard, 1312 pages.
- 1979: Don Juan: mythe littéraire et musical: recueil de textes (introduction by Jean Massin), Stock, 726 pages.

== Filmography ==
- 1966: L'Or et le Plomb by Alain Cuniot as the historian
