= Eroica (1949 film) =

1949 film directed by Walter Kolm-Veltée

- Directed by: Walter Kolm-Veltée
- Written by: Walter Kolm-Veltée; Franz Tassié
- Produced by: Guido Bagier; Walter Kolm-Veltée
- Cinematography: Günther Anders; Hannes Staudinger
- Music by: Alois Melichar; Ludwig van Beethoven
- Release date: 1949
- Running time: 95 minutes
- Country: Austria
- Language: German

Eroica is a 1949 Austrian film depicting composer Ludwig van Beethoven's life and work. The film is directed by Walter Kolm-Veltée, produced by Guido Bagier with Walter Kolm-Veltée and written by Walter Kolm-Veltée with Franz Tassié. It was entered into the 1949 Cannes Film Festival.

== Plot ==
An express messenger rides to Vienna and reports at a ball given by Prince Lichnowsky that Napoleon Bonaparte is approaching Vienna with his troops. The news spreads like wildfire in the city and also reaches Beethoven, who, together with his friends, is sitting in the tavern. Beethoven is very enthusiastic about the ideals embodied by Napoleon after the French Revolution. He hurries home to write a powerful and glorious symphony - which later becomes famous as Beethoven's "Eroica" - for Napoleon. After the symphony is successful, two messengers from Napoleon come to see Beethoven. They request Beethoven to participate in a reception given by the French emperor. Favouring the glamour, Napoleon has elaborated detailed clothing instructions for Beethoven. Beethoven is disappointed by his idol's superficiality and deletes the dedication to Napoleon from the title page of the symphony.

For his safety, Beethoven travels to Hungary and finds quarters at the aristocratic home of his pupil Therese von Brunswick and her cousin Giulietta Guicciardi. Beethoven falls in love with Giulietta, who is even willing to leave her fiancé for Beethoven. This interpretation of Beethoven's life is distorted, however, as it was in 1800, four years earlier, that Beethoven actually met Giulietta. In the film story, Therese thinks that, due to his talent, it is not Beethoven's destiny to have a fulfilling relationship with a woman.

Beethoven not only worries about his nephew Karl whom he thinks is leading a dissolute life and is under his mother's harmful influence but also becomes aware of a worsening of his hearing abilities. As Beethoven despairs of a reason why God would want to deprive him of his hearing, Beethoven's friend Amenda replies that Beethoven's destiny is to compose a type of music never heard before. It is saddening for Beethoven to learn during rehearsals for his opera "Fidelio" that the musicians cannot follow his "conducting", and in fact are actually following their music director instead. In a depressed mood, Beethoven goes home and once more speaks with God, as Amenda's words come to his mind. When Therese comes to look after him, he comes to terms with his destiny and begins to compose again.

== Cast ==
- Ewald Balser — Ludwig van Beethoven
- Marianne Schönauer — Therese von Brunswick
- Judith Holzmeister — Giulietta Guicciardi
- Oskar Werner — Karl, Beethoven's nephew
- Dagny Servaes — Karl's mother
- Iván Petrovich — Prince Lichnowsky
- Ludmilla Hell — Princess Lichnovsky
- Auguste Pünkösdy — Housekeeper
- Hans Kraßnitzer — Amenda
- Alfred Neugebauer — Organist Albrechtsberger
- Richard Eybner — Schuppanzigh
- Karl Günther — Country doctor
- Gustav Waldau — Country parson
- Erik Frey — French Officer
- Franz Pfaudler — Theatre Director
- Julius Brandt — Painter
- Hans Hais — French Officer
- Helmut Janatsch — Austrian Cavalryman
- Karl Kalwoda — Caretaker
