= Julie Guicciardi =

Austrian aristocrat (1784–1856)

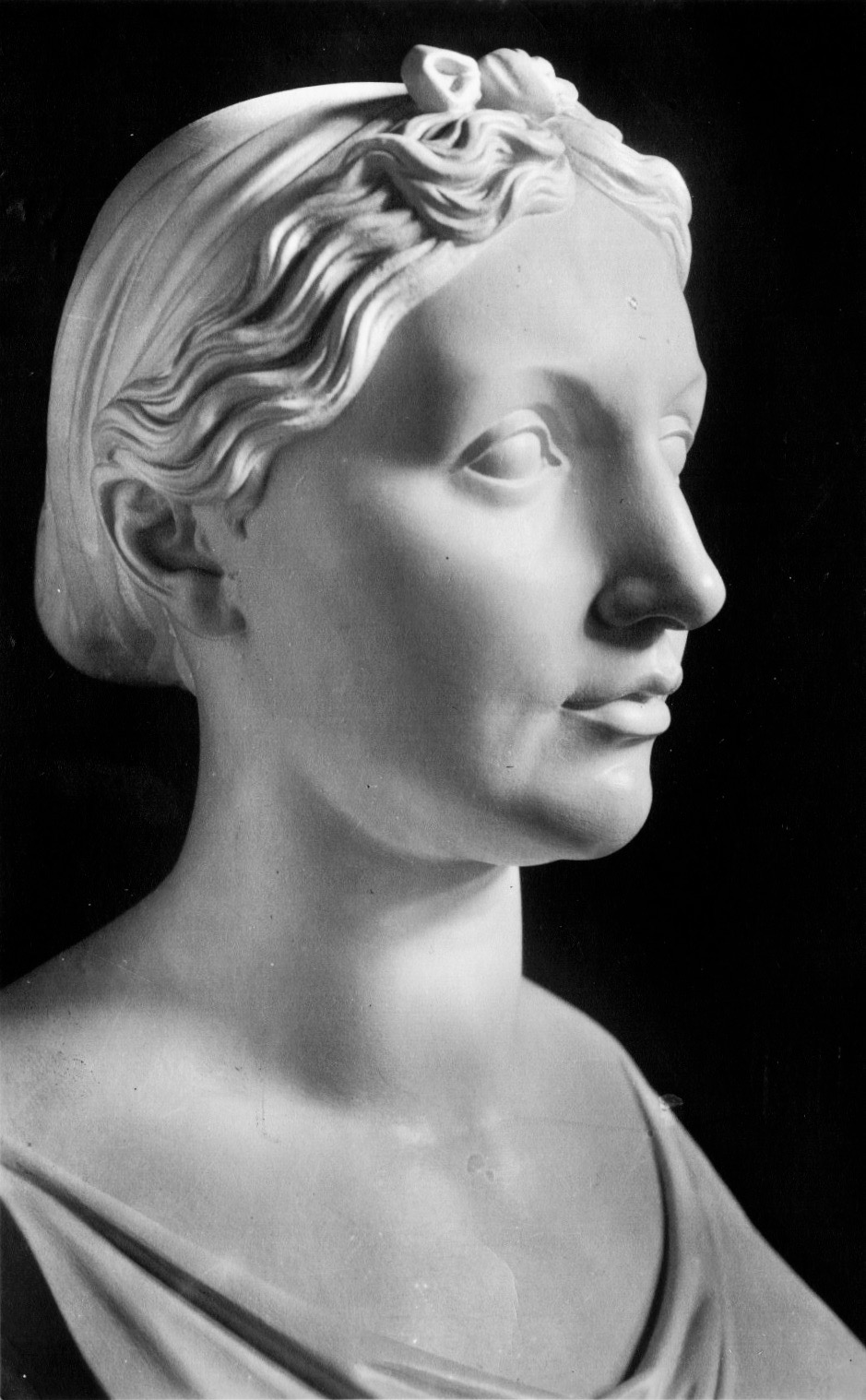
Julie Guicciardi, bust by Konrad Heinrich Schweickle

Julie "Giulietta" Gräfin Guicciardi (German: [ˈjuːli̯ə ɡu̯ɪˈtʃaʁdiː]; Italian: [dʒuˈljetta ɡwitˈtʃardi]; 23 November 1784 – 22 March 1856), later known by her married name Julie Gräfin von Gallenberg, was an Austrian countess and briefly a piano student of Ludwig van Beethoven. His Piano Sonata No. 14, later known as the Moonlight Sonata, was dedicated to her.

== Life ==
Julie (Gräfin) Guicciardi, as she was named by her family, was born in Przemyśl, Galicia, Austrian Poland. (Note: Steblin claimed that Guicciardi was not born in 1784, as often reported, but two years earlier. Two sources, unknown to Steblin, disprove this hypothesis: Guicciardi's baptismal certificate, and the date of birth on her tombstone in Währing.) Her parents were Count Franz Joseph Guicciardi (born in Osijek, Slavonia), an imperial royal official in the Habsburg Empire and Countess Susanna von Brunswik (Famille Brunszvik) (born at the Dolná Krupá manor, in western Slovakia).

She arrived in Vienna with her parents from Trieste in June 1800, and her beauty caused her to be noticed by high society. She was soon engaged to Count von Gallenberg (1780 (Note: A date corrected by Steblin; often incorrectly reported as 1783, thus making Gallenberg 3 years younger.)–1839), an amateur composer, whom she married on 14 November 1803. Subsequently, they moved to Naples. She returned to Vienna in 1822. In later years, Count Hermann von Pückler-Muskau was among her admirers.

She died in Vienna in 1856, and was buried in the Währinger Allgemeiner Friedhof; upon the cemetery's dissolution in 1923, her headstone was among a limited number of interments selected for preservation based on historical significance. Her grave (and legible headstone) exist to this day in a locked Denkmalhain, or Gräberhain, located in the modern Währinger Park precinct – and remain accessible by appointment with the Vienna City Gardens.

== Connection with Beethoven ==
Beethoven became acquainted with Guicciardi through the Brunsvik family (often known in English as "Brunswick"). He was particularly intimate with her cousins, the sisters Therese and Josephine Brunsvik (whom he had taught the piano since 1799).

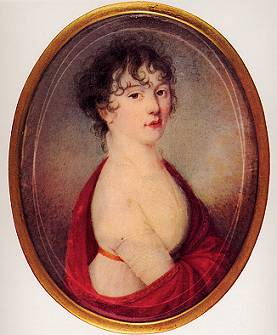
Possible miniature of Guicciardi from Beethoven's possessions

In late 1801, he became Guicciardi's piano teacher, and apparently became infatuated with her. She is probably the "enchanting girl", about whom he wrote on 16 November 1801 to his friend Franz Gerhard Wegeler: "My life is once more a little more pleasant, I'm out and about again, among people – you can hardly believe how desolate, how sad my life has been since these last two years; this change was caused by a sweet, enchanting girl, who loves me and whom I love. After two years, I am again enjoying some moments of bliss, and it is the first time that – I feel that marriage could make me happy, but unfortunately she is not of my station – and now – I certainly could not marry now."

In 1802, he dedicated to her (using the Italian form of her name "Giulietta Guicciardi" to conform with the conventions of dedications) the Piano Sonata No. 14, which although originally titled Sonata quasi una Fantasia (like its companion piece, Piano Sonata No. 13 in E-flat major) subsequently became known by the popular nickname Moonlight Sonata.

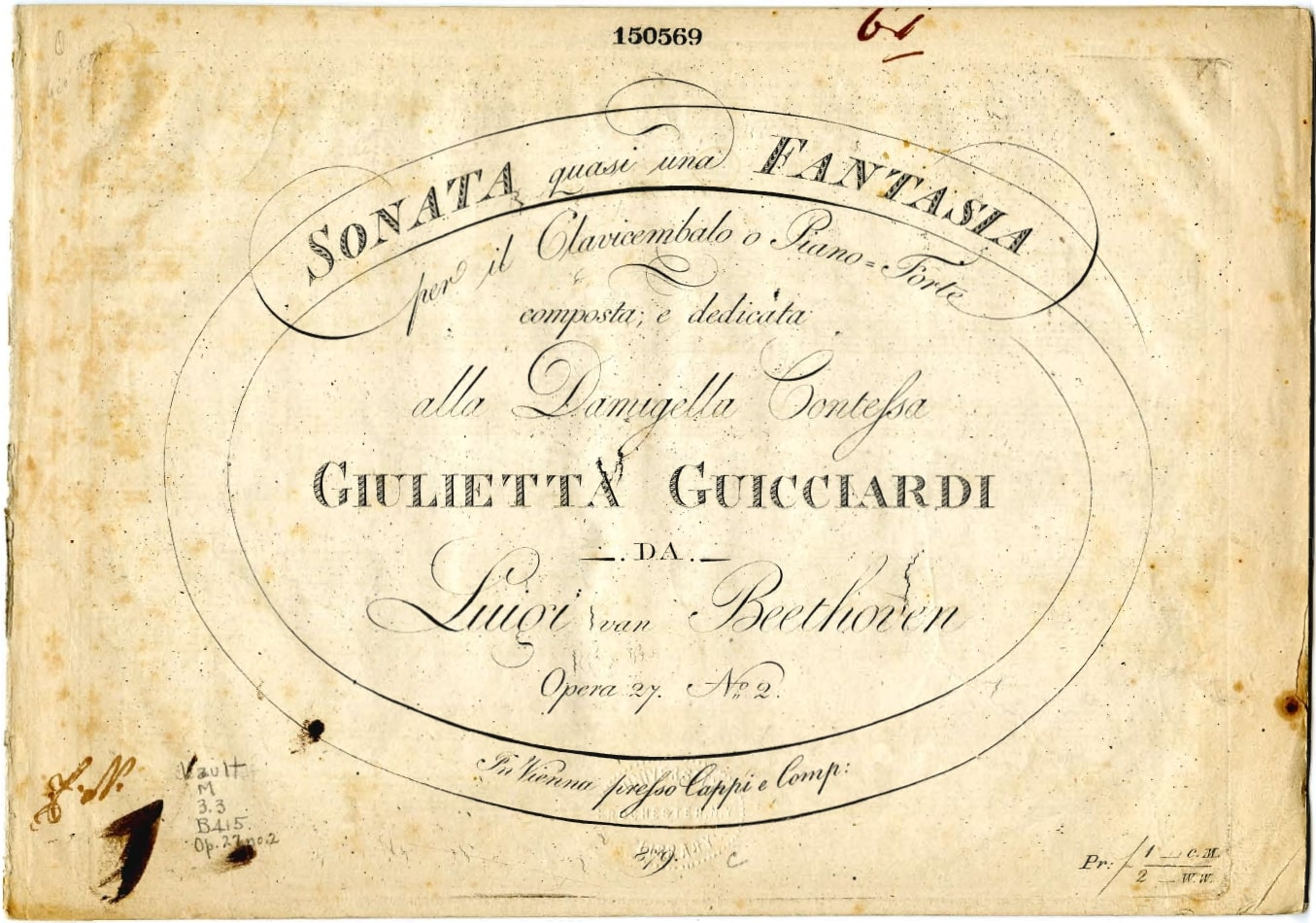
Title page for the first edition of the Piano Sonata No. 14 (1802)

This dedication was not Beethoven's original intention, and he did not have Guicciardi in mind when writing the sonata. Thayer, in his Life of Beethoven, states that the work Beethoven originally intended to dedicate to Guicciardi was the Rondo in G, Op. 51 No. 2, but this had to be dedicated to Countess Lichnowsky. So he cast around at the last moment for a piece to dedicate to Guicciardi. (Note: According to recent scholarship, Beethoven may have dedicated the sonata to Julie as "payback" for an unwanted gift he had received from her mother.)

In 1823, Beethoven confessed to his secretary and later biographer Anton Schindler, that he was indeed in love with her at the time. In his 1840 Beethoven biography, Schindler claimed that "Giulietta" was the addressee of the letter to the "Immortal Beloved". This notion was instantly questioned (though not in public) by her cousin Therese Brunsvik: "Three letters by Beethoven, allegedly to Giulietta. Could they be a hoax?" (Note: The letter to the "Immortal Beloved" consists of three parts.) Therese's doubts were well-founded because, unlike Schindler and other contemporaries, she knew all about the intense and long-lasting romance between Beethoven and her sister Josephine: "Three letters by Beethoven ... they must be to Josephine whom he had loved passionately." (Note: The claim that "Giulietta" was the "Immortal Beloved" has been thoroughly discredited.)

In the 1994 film Immortal Beloved, Countess Guicciardi is played by Valeria Golino.

== Sources ==
- Brandenburg, Sieghard, ed. (1996). Ludwig van Beethoven: Briefwechsel. Gesamtausgabe (8 volumes). Munich: Henle.
- Goldschmidt, Harry (1977a). Um die Unsterbliche Geliebte. Ein Beethoven-Buch. Leipzig: Deutscher Verlag für Musik.
- Goldschmidt, Harry (1977b). "Beethoven in neuen Brunsvik-Briefen". Beethoven-Jahrbuch 1973/77. pp. 97–146.
- Kopitz, Klaus Martin; Cadenbach, Rainer [in German], eds. (2009). Beethoven aus der Sicht seiner Zeitgenossen. Vol. 1. Munich. pp. 411–414.
- Lipsius (La Mara), Ida Marie (1920). Beethoven und die Brunsviks. Leipzig.
- Schindler, Anton (1840). Biographie von Ludwig van Beethoven. Münster.
- Steblin, Rita (2009). "'A dear, enchanting girl who loves me and whom I love': New Facts about Beethoven's Beloved Piano Pupil Julie Guicciardi". Bonner Beethoven-Studien. Vol. 8. pp. 89–152.
- Tellenbach, Marie-Elisabeth (1983). Beethoven und seine "Unsterbliche Geliebte" Josephine Brunswick. Ihr Schicksal und der Einfluß auf Beethovens Werk. Zürich: Atlantis.
