= Winman =

Winman is an English surname. Notable people with the surname include:

- Richard Wenman (c. 1712–1781), Canadian merchant and politician
- Sarah Winman (born 1964), British actor and author

== See also ==
- Wineman
