= Hineman (surname) =

Hineman is a surname. Notable people with the surname include:

- Don Hineman (born 1947), American politician
- Miles Hineman (1851–1930), American politician

== See also ==
- Wineman
