= Miss Montana =

Beauty pageant competition

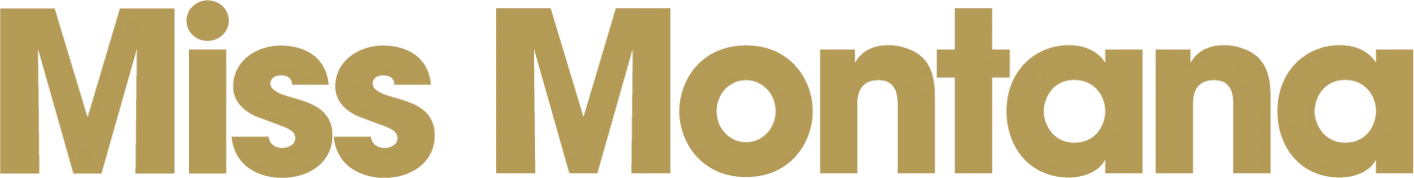
- Formation: 1939
- Type: Beauty pageant
- Location: Butte, Montana
- Executive Director: Audrey Wolfensberger
- President/Field Director: Jessica Criss Picker
- Website: Official website

The Miss Montana competition is the pageant that selects the representative for the U.S. state of Montana in the Miss America pageant.

Unlike most state pageants in the Miss America system, Montana does not use preliminary local pageants to limit entrants to the state-level competition. They accept at large contestants after an application and interview process.

Adella Harris of Helena was crowned Miss Montana on May 30, 2026, at the Mother Lode Theatre in Butte, Montana. She competed for the title of Miss America 2027 on September 6, 2026, at the Kravis Center for the Performing Arts in West Palm Beach, Florida.

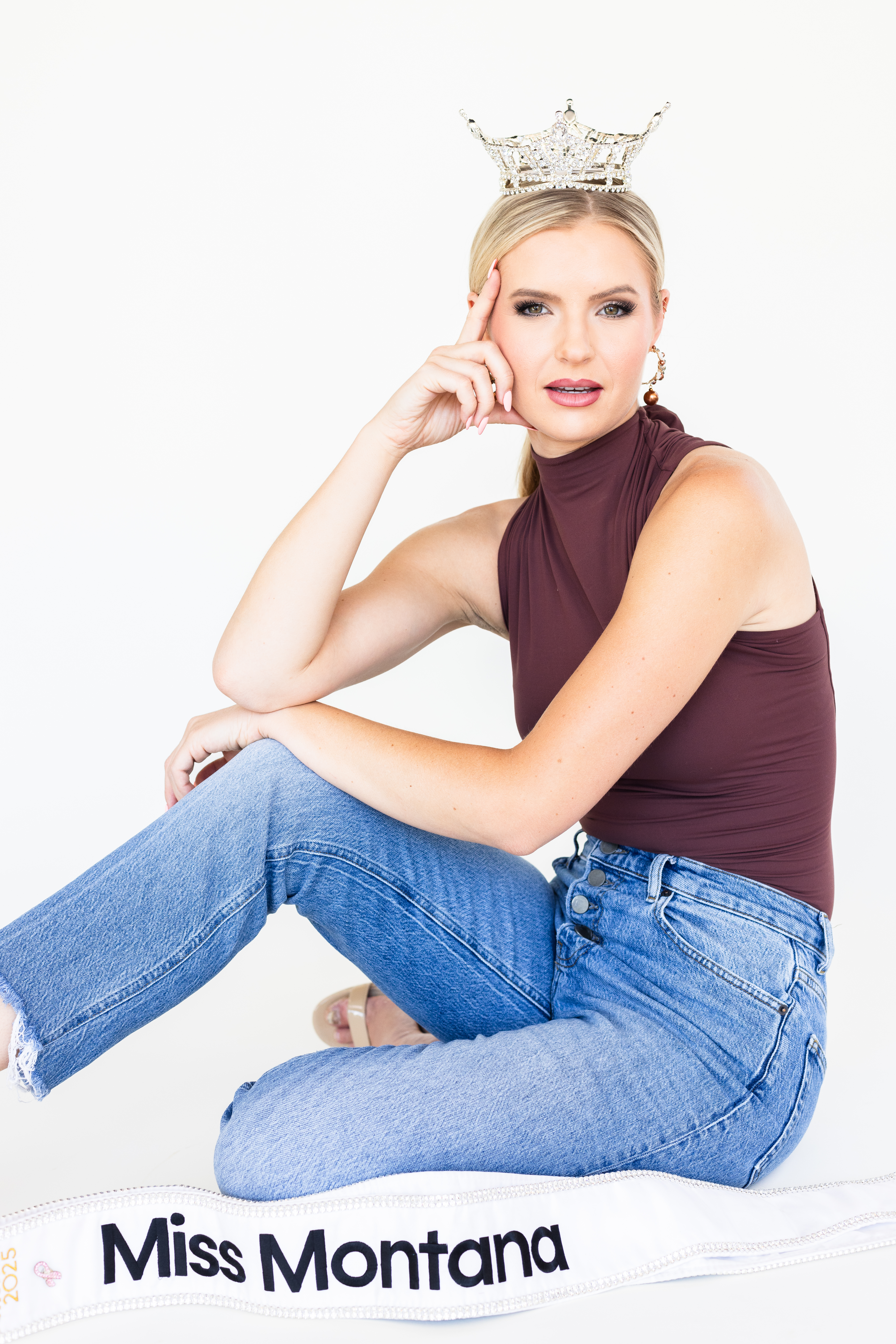
Haley Joy Tate, Miss Montana 2025

== Results summary ==
The following is a visual summary of the past results of Miss Montana titleholders at the national Miss America pageants/competitions. The year in parentheses indicates the year of the national competition during which a placement and/or award was garnered, not the year attached to the contestant's state title.

=== Placements ===
- Top 10: Joanna Lester (1962), Yvonne Dehner (1995)
- Top 15: Kay Kittendorf (1940), Patti Luer (1948)
- Top 16: Alexis Wineman (2013)

=== Awards ===
==== Preliminary awards ====
- Preliminary Talent: Kay Kittendorf (1940), Patti Luer (1948), Diana Pacini (1976), Yvonne Dehner (1995)

==== Non-finalist awards ====
- Non-finalist Talent: Dianne Feller (1966), Debbie Reber (1974), Lilly Cruise (1981), Jenni Ramseth (1992), Laura Haller (2019)

==== Other awards ====
- Miss Congeniality: Carol Fraser (1949) (tie), Bridget Clawson (2007), Adella Harris (2027)
- America's Choice: Alexis Wineman (2013)
- Dr. David B. Allman Medical Scholarship: Janice Frankino (1977), Julie Reil (1988), Mo Shea (2020)
- Quality of Life Award Finalists: Brittany Wiser (2010)
- STEM Scholarship Award Winners: Laura Haller (2019)
- STEM Scholarship Award Finalists: Lauren Scofield (2017), Mo Shea (2020)

== Winners ==
- Declared as winner
- Ended as a runner-up
- Ended as a finalist or semi-finalist

Year	Name	Hometown	Age	Local Title	Miss America Talent	Placement at Miss America	Special scholarships at Miss America	Notes
2026	Adella Harris	Helena	19	Miss Queen City	Ballet Dance		Miss Congeniality	
2025	Haley Joy Tate	Missoula	25	Miss Missoula	Monologue			
2024	Kaylee Wolfensberger	Bozeman	20	Miss Bozeman	Piano - Great Balls of Fire			
2023	Faith Johnson	Helena	23	Miss Queen City	Vocal "Phantom of the Opera"			Previously Miss Montana's Outstanding Teen 2016
2022	Alexa Baisch	Glendive	22	—	Tap Dance "Runaway Baby"			Previously Miss Montana's Outstanding Teen 2017
2020–21 (Note: State competition took place in 2020, as national pageant postponed to 2021 for the 2022 edition due to the COVID-19 pandemic.)	Jessica Criss	Bozeman	23	—	Vocal			
2019	Mo Shea	Helena	22	—	Vocal		Dr. & Mrs. David Allman Medical Scholarship STEM Scholarship Award Finalist	Previously Miss Montana's Outstanding Teen 2012
2018	Laura Haller	Helena	24	—	Ballet en Pointe, "Spanish Dance"		Non-finalist Talent Award STEM Scholarship Award	
2017	Maddie Murray	Corvallis	18	—	Vocal, "God Help the Outcasts"			1st Runner to Miss Montana Teen USA 2016 & 2017
2016	Lauren Scofield	Havre	22	—	Piano, "Moonlight Sonata" by Beethoven		STEM Scholarship Award Finalist	Niece of Miss Montana 1986, Kamala Compton
2015	Danielle Wineman	Cut Bank	23	—	Piano, "Pirates of the Caribbean"			Sister of Alexis Wineman, Miss Montana 2012 Previously Montana's Junior Miss 2010
2014	Victoria Valentine	Missoula	22	—	Harp/Vocal, "I Won't Give Up"			Previously Miss Montana's Outstanding Teen 2008
2013	Sheridan Pope	Sidney	21	—	Tap Dance, "Kiss"			4th runner-up at Miss Montana Teen USA 2010 pageant Resigned from position as special education teacher in April 2017 for inappropriate Twitter posts about her job and students
2012	Alexis Wineman	Cut Bank	18		Monologue, "I Think, Therefore I Am Fat"	Top 16	America's Choice	Sister of Danielle Wineman, Miss Montana 2015 First contestant with autism to compete at Miss America
2011	Veronika Ohlinger	Cooke City	23		Vocal, "Alone"			Previously Miss West Virginia's Outstanding Teen 2005 Assumed the title when Chuter resigned
2011	Taryn Chuter	Corvallis	23		Contemporary Dance	N/A		Resigned for personal reasons
2010	Kacie West	Kalispell	21		Vocal, "Don't Rain on My Parade" from Funny Girl			Later Miss Montana USA 2013
2009	Brittany Wiser	Bozeman	21		Vocal, "Sway"		Quality of Life Award Finalist	Later Miss Montana USA 2011
2008	Jennifer Hepner	Great Falls	23		Raqs Sharqi Dance			Contestant at National Sweetheart 2006 pageant Suspended of duties on February 16, 2009, due to DUI charge
2007	Kristen Mantooth	Lewistown	22		Lyrical Dance, "Beauty from Pain"			
2006	Christie Hageman	Billings	23		Classical Vocal, "Il Bacio" by Luigi Arditi			
2005	Sophia Steinbeisser	Sidney	21		Tap Dance, "Boogie Woogie Bugle Boy"			
2004	Evangelina Duke	Billings	20		Vocal, "Man of La Mancha" from Man of La Mancha			
2003	Amber Shipman	Glendive	19		Dance, "Save Tonight"			Relieved of her duties on February 27, 2004, due to controversy with pageant directors
2002	Heather Rathbun	Darby	24		Taekwondo Demonstration, Music from Mortal Kombat			
2001	Kara Svennungsen	Shelby	22		Vocal, "On My Own" from Les Misérables			
2000	Jana LaBree	Ekalaka	24	Miss Southeastern Montana	Gospel Vocal, "Because of Who You Are"			
1999	Elissa Schwarz	Terry	19	Miss Big Sky	Flute, "Carmen Fantasy"			
1998	Delight Michelle Scheck	Helena	21	Miss Missoula/Garden City	Semi-classical Vocal, "And This Is My Beloved"			
1997	Kristen Garlock	Billings	24	Miss Billings	Vocal, "Romany Life" from The Fortune Teller			
1996	Aubrey Hiller	Missoula	22	Miss Treasure State	Vocal, "All the Things You Are"			Previously Miss Montana Teen USA 1992
1995	Amanda Granrud	Great Falls	23	Miss Helena	Dramatic Reading			
1994	Yvonne Dehner	Brockton	24	Miss Western Montana	Semi-classical Vocal, "One Kiss" from The New Moon	Top 10	Preliminary Talent Award	
1993	Erica Havig	Billings	19	Miss Billings	Ballet en Pointe			
1992	JoAnn Jorgensen	Helena	24	Miss Central Montana	Gymnastics / Dance			Previously Miss Montana USA 1991
1991	Jenni Ramseth	Billings	18	Miss Yellowstone County	Classical Piano, Variations sérieuses by Felix Mendelssohn		Non-finalist Talent Award	
1990	Karen McNenny	Missoula	18	Miss Missoula County	Classical Ballet en Pointe, Coppélia			
1989	Cathy Brewer	Hamilton	20	Miss Western Montana	Ballet en Pointe			
1988	Becky McRae	Miles City	17	Miss Southeastern Montana	Vocal, "On My Own" from Les Misérables			
1987	Julie Reil	Miles City	19	Miss Missoula County	Vocal, "Being Alive" from Company		Dr. David B. Allman Medical Scholarship	
1986	Kamala Compton	Havre	21	Miss Eastern Montana College	Gymnastics Dance			
1985	Julie Culbertson	Billings	19	Miss Yellowstone Valley	Jazz Dance			
1984	Michele Larson	Billings	21	Miss Rocky Mountain College	Vocal, "My Tribute" by Andraé Crouch			
1983	Laurie Nelson	Billings	19	Miss Eastern Montana College	Classical Piano, L'isle joyeuse by Claude Debussy			
1982	Kimberly Knauf	Billings	21	Miss Rocky Mountain College	Piano Medley, "Jump Shout Boogie" & "Sonata Pathétique"			
1981	Sue Harris	Helena	19	Miss Helena	Gymnastics Dance, Theme from Hawaii Five-O			
1980	Lilly Cruise	Miles City	20	Miss Eastern Montana College	Popular Vocal, "I Can See It"		Non-finalist Talent Award	
1979	Lori Conlon	Billings	20	Miss Rocky Mountain College	Piano, "Toccata"			
1978	Vanessa Ochsner	Missoula	18	Miss Missoula County	Popular Vocal / Dance, "Yes"			
1977	Sue Stanaway	Billings	22	Miss Missoula County	Classical Vocal, "The Doll's Song" from The Tales of Hoffmann			
1976	Janice Frankino	Helena	19	Miss Helena	Gymnastics / Jazz Dance, "The Yankee Doodle Boy"		Dr. David B. Allman Medical Scholarship	
1975	Diana Pacini	Great Falls	20	Miss Garden City	Classical Piano, "Études Op. 10" by Chopin		Preliminary Talent Award	
1974	Pamela Royer	Billings	20	Miss Eastern Montana College	Gymnastic Floor Exercise, "Love Story"			
1973	Debbie Reber	Helena	22	Miss Helena	Vocal Medley & Guitar		Non-finalist Talent Award	
1972	Debra DeBiase	Billings	21	Miss Rocky Mountain College	Ballet, "Summer of '42"			
1971	Nancy Harper	Helena	18	Miss Helena	Vocal, "I'm the Greatest Star" from Funny Girl			
1970	Jane Opp	Billings	20	Miss West Billings	Piano, Le Cavalier Fantastique by Benjamin Godard			Took over title after original winner, Kathy Huppe, resigned due to pageant officials asking her to stop speaking out against the Vietnam War
1969	Jeanne Meek	Bridger	22	Miss Rocky Mountain College	Piano, "Toccata" by Paul Ben-Haim			
1968	Karen Frank	Park City	21	Miss Eastern Montana College	Western Vocal & Guitar, "I Want to Be a Cowboy's Sweetheart"			
1967	Linda Rhein	Helena	20	Miss University of Montana	Original Piano Composition, "What the West Contributed to America"			
1966	Nancy McLeod	Kalispell	19	Miss Kalispell	Popular Vocal / Drama			
1965	Dianne Feller	Helena	21	Miss West Billings	Classical Vocal, "Un bel dì vedremo" from Madama Butterfly		Non-finalist Talent Award	
1964	Merilee Miller	Radersburg	20	Miss Western Montana College	Dance			
1963	Roberta Tarbox	Missoula		Miss Missoula	Classical Vocal			
1962	Marsha Thompson	Bozeman	21	Miss Montana State College	Dress Making & Design			
1961	Joanna Lester	Missoula	20	Miss Montana State University, Missoula	Vocal Medley, "Bewitched, Bothered and Bewildered" & "There Once Was a Man" from The Pajama Game	Top 10		
1960	Lois Marie Volkel	Missoula	18	Miss Missoula	Classical Vocal, "Voi lo Sapete" from Cavalleria rusticana			
1959	Sharon D. Tietjen	Great Falls			Original Humorous Interpretation			
1958	No Montana representative at Miss America pageant							
1957	No Montana representative at Miss America pageant							
1956	Alice Jean White	Great Falls			Art			The original winner, Marjorie Edmondson, was disqualified as she was married
1955	Bertha Mae Huebl	Glendive			Vocal			
1954	No Montana representative at Miss America pageant							
1953	No Montana representative at Miss America pageant							
1952	Karen Whittet	Livingston			Piano			
1951	Patricia Joan McGinty	Great Falls	21		Classical Vocal, "Mon cœur s'ouvre à ta voix" from Samson and Delilah			
1950	Donna Marie Buls	Missoula						
1949	Carol Fraser	Billings			Equestrian Display		Miss Congeniality (tie)	After her horse nearly fell into the orchestra pit, the use of live animals was banned from Miss America talent competition
1948	Patti Luer	Anaconda			Vocal / Dance, "Gypsy Song"	Top 15	Preliminary Talent Award	
1947	Carol Chaffin	Corvallis			Classical Vocal, "Mon cœur s'ouvre à ta voix" from Samson and Delilah			
1941–1946	No Montana representative at Miss America pageant							
1940	Kay Kittendorf	Missoula			Classical Vocal, "Un bel dì vedremo" from Madama Butterfly	Top 15	Preliminary Talent Award	
1939	Lucille Chouinard	Fort Peck						
1935–1938	No Montana representative at Miss America pageant							
1934	No national pageant was held							
1933	No Montana representative at Miss America pageant							
1932	No national pageants were held							
1931	No national pageants were held							
1930	No national pageants were held							
1929	No national pageants were held							
1928	No national pageants were held							
1921–27	No Montana representative at Miss America pageant							

== See also ==
- Miss Montana's Teen
