= The Quiet Room (2018 film) =

2018 American short horror film

- Promotional release poster
- Directed by: Sam Wineman
- Written by: Sam Wineman
- Starring: Jamal Douglas; Alaska Thunderfuck; Kit Williamson; Lisa Wilcox
- Cinematography: Brent Bailey
- Edited by: Kaitlin Hollingsworth
- Release date: February 2018 (Nevermore Film Festival)
- Running time: 28 minutes
- Country: United States
- Language: English

The Quiet Room is a 2018 American short horror film written and directed by Sam Wineman. It stars Jamal Douglas as Michael, a man who, after a suicide attempt, wakes up in a hospital and starts to believe that he has awakened a demon. Alongside Douglas, the film stars Alaska Thunderfuck, Kit Williamson, and Lisa Wilcox.

The Quiet Room was screened at the Nevermore Film Festival and Outfest in 2018, and was officially uploaded to Facebook and YouTube by Crypt TV in June 2019. The following month, the film was made available for streaming on Shudder.

== Synopsis ==
The film begins with Michael collecting and swallowing a large amount of pills. Briefly debating to write a suicide note, he decides against it. He wakes in a hospital, where he meets fellow patients Hunter, Rachel, and Joe. They invite him into their group and warn him about Hattie, a demon that stalks suicidal patients. He's told to always keep a cup of water nearby, as Hattie hates water, and that she will kill anyone that comes between her and her chosen victim. Michael shares an attraction with Hunter, particularly after he becomes Michael's roommate. Hunter gives him more information about Hattie, specifically that she is also warded away by suicide notes.

Michael befriends one of the nurses, Amy, who gives him a writing journal. She's later reported to have tripped and fallen over a railing, however Michael is certain that she was killed by Hattie. Later Michael experiences a nightmare about his former lover Ben, who died from exposure on a snowy winter night while the two were camping. He's soothed by Hunter and the two make love. A jealous Hattie later kills Hunter by slitting his wrists in the room's bathroom. Michael is discovered inconsolable over Hunter's body and placed in the quiet room. When he's removed for an exam, Hattie attacks and murders the nursing staff. Mentally and emotionally exhausted, Michael gives up and embraces Hattie in the quiet room. Before she can fully claim him Michael is saved by Rachel and Joe triggering the fire sprinklers, however he chooses to remain behind and face Hattie. Michael writes a "suicide" note stating that he wanted to live and crams it in Hattie's mouth, causing her to fall to the floor motionless. Michael, Rachel, and Joe are then shown happily playing cards outside at a later date. The short ends with Michael turning to look at water spilling out of a hose with a terrified look, implying that Hattie may have possessed him.

== Cast ==
- Jamal Douglas as Michael
- Kit Williamson as Hunter
- Alaska Thunderfuck as Hattie
  - Eric Snow as Hattie's Final Form
- Lisa Wilcox as Amy
- Brian McCook as David
- Chris Salvatore as Joe
- Barkley Harper as Rachel
- Stephanie Kerbis as Judy
- Indar Smith as Ben

== Production ==
In a 2018 interview with Rue Morgue, Wineman described the film as an allegorical way of "[sharing] my personal journey with mental health". The characters of Hattie and Amy were written specifically for their actors, Alaska Thunderfuck and Lisa Wilcox respectively, prior to either signing on for the short film. Wineman has stated that the creative process for a short film was challenging, as it was hard to determine what to include or cut in the film and that he "Had to remind myself that scaffolding is meant to be torn down."

== Release ==
The Quiet Room screened at the Nevermore Film Festival in February 2018, where it won the Jury Award for Best Long-Form Narrative Short. The film was later screened at the LGBT-oriented film festival Outfest on March 11, 2018. In June of the following year, the film was officially uploaded to Facebook and YouTube by Crypt TV, followed by a release on the streaming service Shudder on July 29, 2019.

== Reception ==
Scream magazine's Jon Dickinson reviewed the short, praising Douglas's acting and stating that the visuals "will make even the most hardened viewer feel unsteady". The San Diego Gay and Lesbian News and David Lopez of Instinct reviewed The Quiet Room favorably, the latter of which writing that it was "refreshing to see a gay lead that pushes the plot forward—not to mention a person of color!". Rue Morgue's Bryan Christopher reviewed the film in a roundup of short films for October 2018, stating that it was "the first short film I’ve seen that actually made tears well up while I was watching it."

=== Awards ===
- Jury Award for Best Long-Form Narrative Short at the Nevermore Film Festival (2018, won)
