= Wenzel Robert von Gallenberg =

Austrian composer and theatre director (1783–1839)

- Born: 28 December 1783; Vienna, Austria
- Died: 13 March 1839 (aged 55); Rome, Papal States
- Occupation: Composer
- Spouse: Giulietta Guicciardi

Wenzel Robert von Gallenberg (28 December 1783 – 13 March 1839) (full name Johann Wenzel Robert Maria Joseph Sigmund Seyfried, Count Gallenberg) was an Austrian composer, particularly of ballets, which were produced in Vienna and Italy.

== Life ==
Gallenberg was born in Vienna. Showing an interest in music at an early age, he did not pursue an official career. He studied composition with Johann Georg Albrechtsberger (whose notable pupils included Beethoven). From 1801 his compositions appeared in print; he produced piano works and orchestral works.

On 3 November 1803 he married Countess Giulietta Guicciardi. She had been a pupil of Beethoven, who dedicated his Piano Sonata No. 14 ("Moonlight sonata") to her in 1802. In 1805 Gallenberg and his wife went to Naples, where he prepared the music, mostly his own compositions, for a concert on 31 May in honour of Joseph Bonaparte, which was well received. Early in 1806, when Joseph Bonaparte was King of Naples, Gallenberg became Directeur des ballets; in charge of music in the court theatre of Naples, he widened the repertoire of the company.

In 1821 the impresario Domenico Barbaia, at that time manager of the court theatre in Naples, became manager of the Theater am Kärntnertor, the court theatre of Vienna; Gallenberg, moving to Vienna, became head of the administration committee of the theatre and was in charge of the music archives. In January 1829 he became lessee of the Theater am Kärntnertor; this arrangement ended in May 1830 when he was in financial difficulty. In the following years he lived in Italy and France. In 1838 he retired to Rome, where he died in 1839.

== Ballets ==
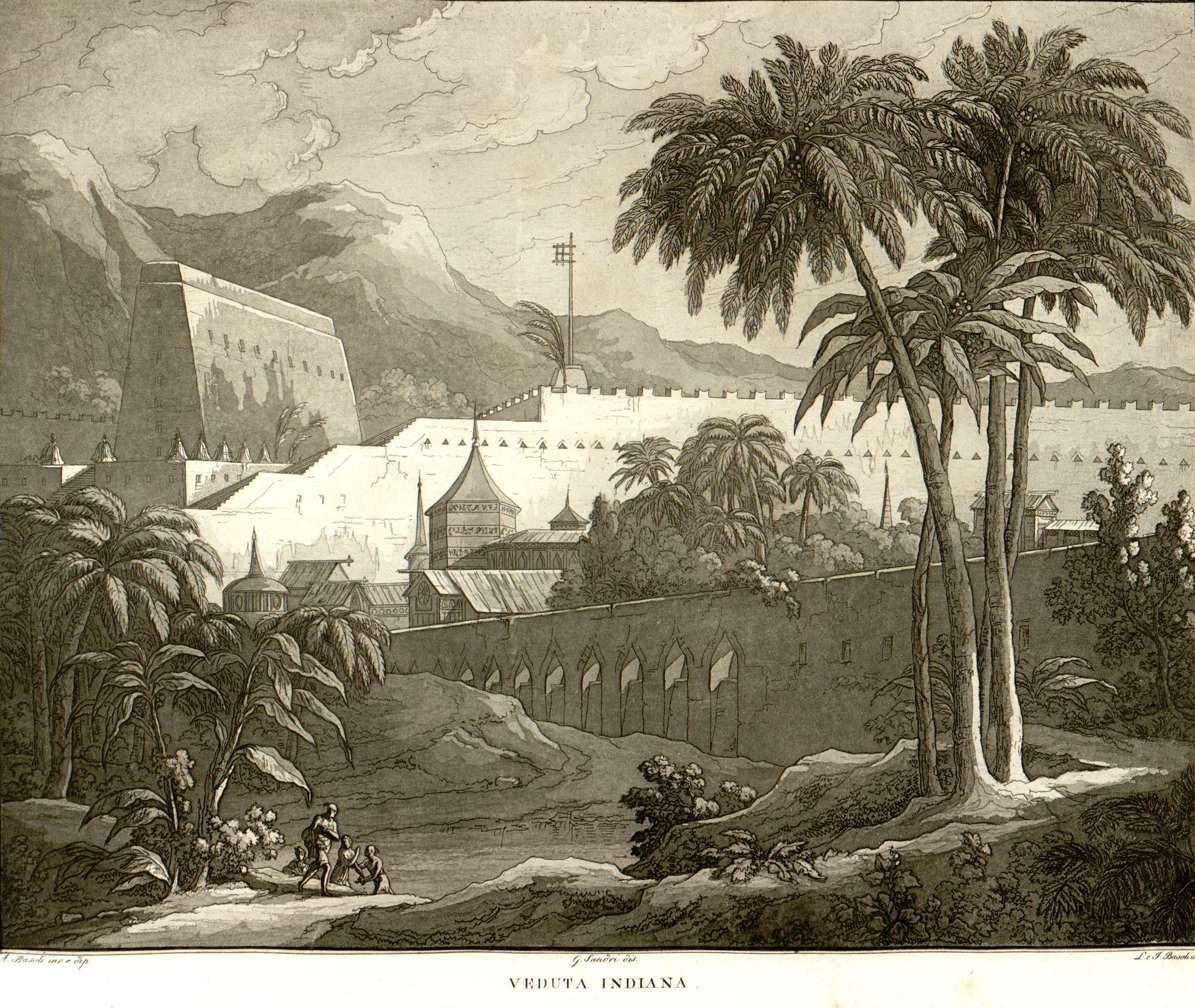
Veduta Indiana, set design for I riti Iidiani (1813).

Gallenberg wrote about 50 ballets; some of the more notable are:

- Samson (Naples and Vienna, 1811)
- Arsinoe and Telemaco (Milan, 1813)
- I Riti Indiani (Milan, 1814)
- Amleto (Milan, 1815)
- Alfred der Grosse (Vienna, 1820)
- Joan d'Arc (Vienna, 1821)
- Margereta (Vienna 1822)
- Ismaana Grab (Vienna, 1823)
- La Caravana del Cairo (Naples, 1824)
- Ottavio Pinelli (Vienna, 1828)
- Das befreite Jerusalem (Vienna, 1828)
- Caesar in Egypten (Vienna, 1829)
- Theodosia (Vienna, 1831)
- Orpheus und Eurydice (Vienna, 1831)
- Agnes und Fitz Henri (Vienna, 1833)
- Biancas Wahl (Vienna, 1835)
- Latona's Rache (Vienna, 1838)
