= Andante favori =

1804 composition for solo piano by Ludwig van Beethoven

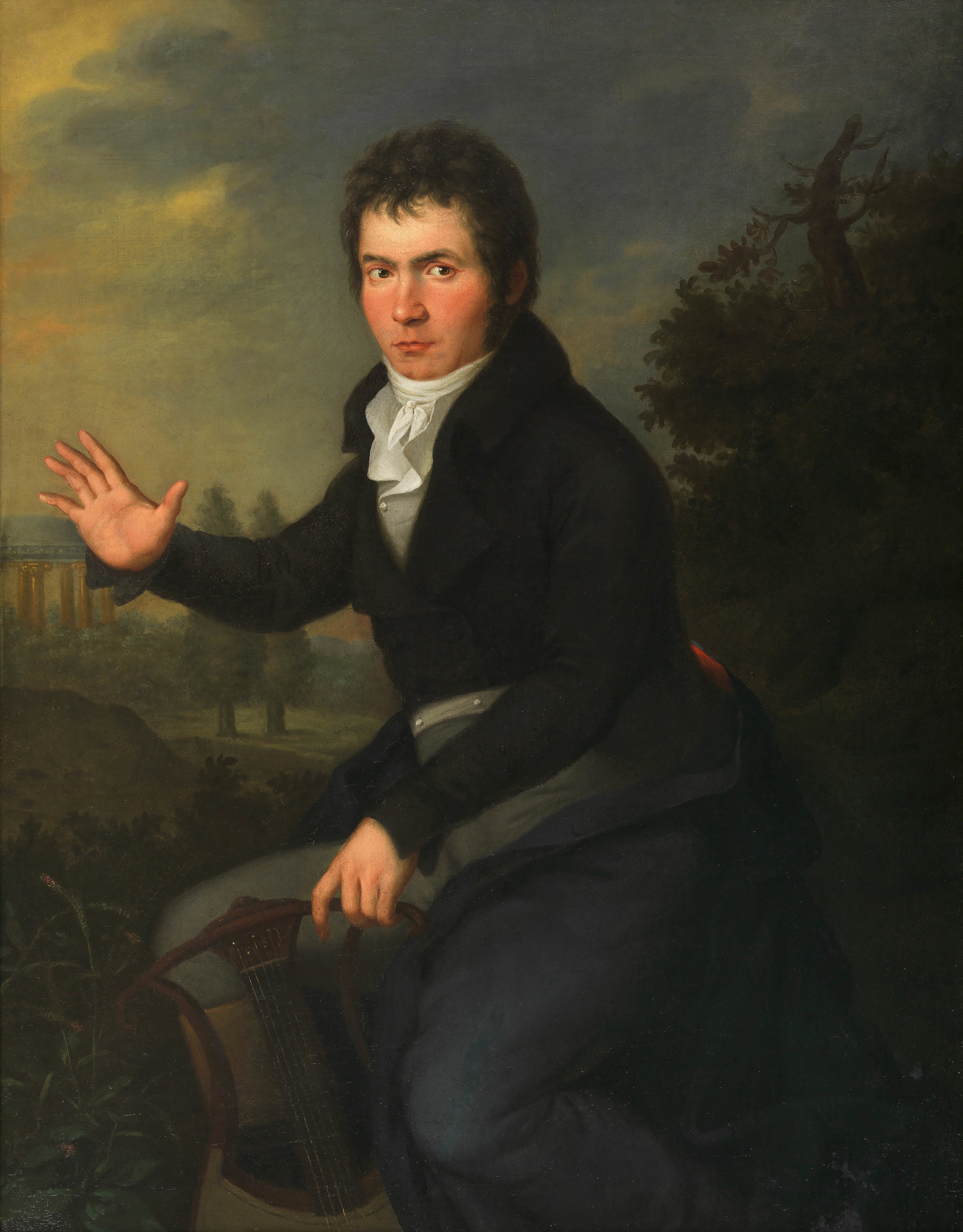
Portrait of Ludwig van Beethoven by Joseph Willibrord Mähler (c. 1804)

The Andante favori is a work for piano solo by Ludwig van Beethoven. In catalogues of Beethoven's works, it is designated as WoO 57.

== Composition and reception ==
The Andante favori was written between 1803 and 1804, and published in 1805. It was originally intended to be the second of the three movements of Beethoven's Waldstein Piano Sonata, Op. 53. The following extract from Thayer's Beethoven biography explains the change:

Ries reports (Notizen, p. 101) that a friend of Beethoven's said to him that the sonata was too long, for which he was terribly taken to task by the composer. But after quiet reflection Beethoven was convinced of the correctness of the criticism. The andante... was therefore excluded and in its place supplied the interesting Introduction to the rondo which it now has. A year after the publication of the sonata, the andante also appeared separately.

It was composed as a musical declaration of love for Countess Josephine Brunsvik, but the Brunsvik family increased the pressure to terminate the relationship. She could not contemplate marrying Beethoven, a commoner.

The reason for the title was given by Beethoven's pupil Czerny, quoted in Thayer: "Because of its popularity (for Beethoven played it frequently in society) he gave it the title Andante favori ("favored Andante").

== The music ==
The Andante favori is in F major (the subdominant of the Waldstein key), in 3/8 time, and is marked Andante grazioso con moto. Formally, the work is a rondo, with each return of the theme appearing in varied form. The theme itself is fairly extended and in ternary form. The work takes about nine minutes to play.

== Adaptations in popular culture ==
The makers of the 1995 BBC adaptation of Jane Austen's novel Pride and Prejudice used the Andante favori as the musical content of a concocted scene in which Elizabeth Bennet and Fitzwilliam Darcy exchange tender glances while his sister Georgiana plays the andante on the fortepiano. (Note: Pride and Prejudice (1995) BBC. Episode 5, about six minutes from the beginning.) The action of the scene is timed to match two modulations in the music, from F to D♭ major and then back again.
