= Brittany Wiser =

American beauty pageant title holder in Montana

- Born: Brittany Wiser; August 2, 1987 (age 39); Bozeman, Montana, U.S.
- Education: University of Oklahoma Independent Learning High School; University of Denver; Montana State University
- Height: 5 ft (1.5 m)
- Beauty pageant titleholder
- Title: Miss Montana 2009; Miss Montana USA 2011
- Hair color: Brunette
- Eye color: Hazel
- Major competitions: Miss America 2010; Miss USA 2011

Brittany Wiser (born August 2, 1987) is an American model and beauty pageant titleholder. she is one of only two women to earn both the Miss Montana and Miss Montana USA titles. She is also the only titleholder to do so consecutively.

== Early life and education ==
Wiser was born in Bozeman, Montana, on August 2, 1987, to Betty and Lee Wiser. She is a summa cum laude, Phi Beta Kappa, 2009 graduate of the University of Denver with a degree in communications management and minors in chemistry & leadership. After graduation, she enrolled in the pre-medical post-baccalaureate program at Montana State University.

== Pageant career ==
On June 18, 2009, Brittany Wiser entered her first-ever beauty pageant. On June 20, she was crowned Miss Montana 2009. Unlike most state pageants in the Miss America system, Montana does not use preliminary local pageants to limit entrants to the state-level competition. In January 2010, she competed in the Miss America 2010 pageant in Las Vegas, Nevada. Wiser was a Top-10 finalist for the Quality of Life Award. Her platform was suicide prevention and her talent was singing.

In September 2010, Wiser won the title of Miss Montana USA 2011.

Preceded by Jennifer Hepner	Miss Montana; 2009	Succeeded by Kacie West
Preceded by Elizabeth Anseth	Miss Montana USA; 2011	Succeeded by Autumn Muller
