= Danielle Wineman =

Miss Montana 2015

- Born: 1992 (age 33–34)
- Education: Stephens College University of California, San Diego
- Beauty pageant titleholder
- Title: Montana's Junior Miss 2010; Miss Montana 2015
- Major competition: Miss America 2016

Danielle Wineman is an American actress and beauty pageant titleholder from Cut Bank, Montana, who was named Montana's Junior Miss 2010 and crowned Miss Montana 2015. She competed for the Miss America 2016 title in September 2015. Her younger sister, Alexis Wineman, was crowned Miss Montana 2012.

== Early life and education ==
Wineman is a native of Cut Bank, Montana, and a 2010 graduate of Cut Bank High School. Her father is Michael Wineman and her mother is Kimberly Butterworth. Her younger sister, Alexis Wineman, was crowned Miss Montana 2012.her brother is Nicholas Wineman and younger sister Amanda Wineman.

Wineman is a 2013 graduate of Stephens College in Columbia, Missouri, where she earned a Bachelor of Arts degree in theatre. She will also be attending the University of California-San Diego in San Diego, California this fall to obtain her Master of Fine Arts degree in Acting.

== Pageant career ==
=== Early competitions ===
In June 2006, Wineman entered the Miss Montana's Outstanding Teen pageant and was named first runner-up for the state title.

In August 2009, Wineman won the title of Montana's Junior Miss 2010. (Her sister Amanda won the same title for 2011.) She was not a finalist for the national title.

In January 2010, Wineman won first place for Humorous Solo at the 2009–10 Montana State Drama, Speech and Debate championships.

=== Miss Montana 2015 ===
Wineman entered the Miss Montana pageant in June 2015 as one of 14 qualifiers for the state title. Wineman's competition talent was a piano solo of music from the Pirates of the Caribbean movies. Her platform is "Growing Compassion: One Scene at a Time" which emphasizes empathy and verbal communication.

Wineman won the competition on Saturday, June 13, 2015, when she received her crown from outgoing Miss Montana titleholder Victoria Valentine. She was also chosen as "most photogenic" and won the "Outstanding Interview" award. Wineman earned more than $5,000 in scholarship money and other prizes from the state pageant. As Miss Montana, her activities include public appearances across the state of Montana.

=== Vying for Miss America 2016 ===
Wineman was Montana's representative at the Miss America 2016 pageant in Atlantic City, New Jersey, in September 2015. In the televised finale on September 13, 2015, she placed outside the Top 15 semi-finalists and was eliminated from competition. She was awarded a $3,000 scholarship prize as her state's representative.

Awards and achievements
Preceded by Victoria Valentine	Miss Montana; 2015	Succeeded by Lauren N. Scofield
