= Miss Montana USA =

Beauty pageant competition

- Formation: 1952
- Type: Beauty pageant
- Headquarters: Great Falls
- Location: Montana
- Members: Miss USA
- Official language: English
- Website: missmontanausa.com

The Miss Montana USA competition is the pageant that selects the representative for the state of Montana in the Miss USA pageant. From 1994 to 2007, it was directed by Carol Hirata and the Carlton Group, based in Bellvue, Colorado. In 2012, it was taken by Pageants NW Productions based in Puyallup, Washington until 2021. From 2021 through early 2025 (prior to the 2025 contest), the pageant was based in Great Falls, Montana under organization by Lime Light Enterprises, with its State Director being Lisa Pierce. Since early 2025, the directorship has been vacant.

Miss Montana USA 2005 Amanda Kimmel was chosen to represent the United States in the 2005 Miss Earth pageant. Although she did not place at Miss USA, Kimmel finished in the Top 8 at Miss Earth and was later selected to participate in Survivor: China, Survivor: Micronesia and Survivor: Heroes vs. Villains.

Lisbeth Fernández of Miami, FL was appointed Miss Montana USA on July 30th, 2026 after the open casting call from Thomas Brodeur, the new owner of the national pageant. She later represented Montana at Miss USA 2026, finishing in the top 20, ending a 68-year placement drought for the state.

== Gallery of winners ==
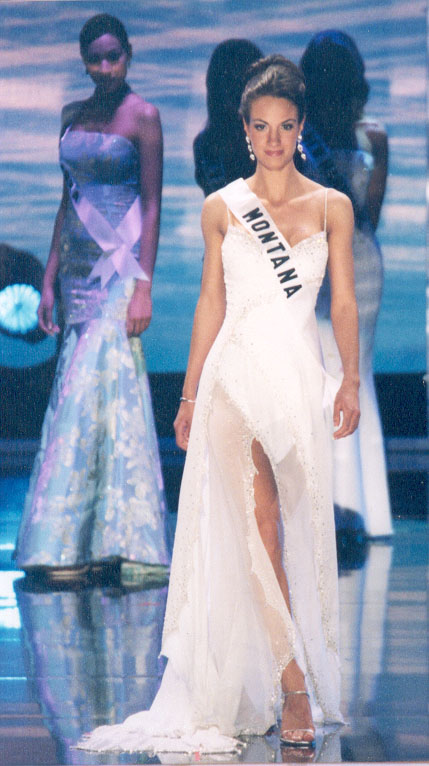
Megan Monroe, Miss Montana USA 2003

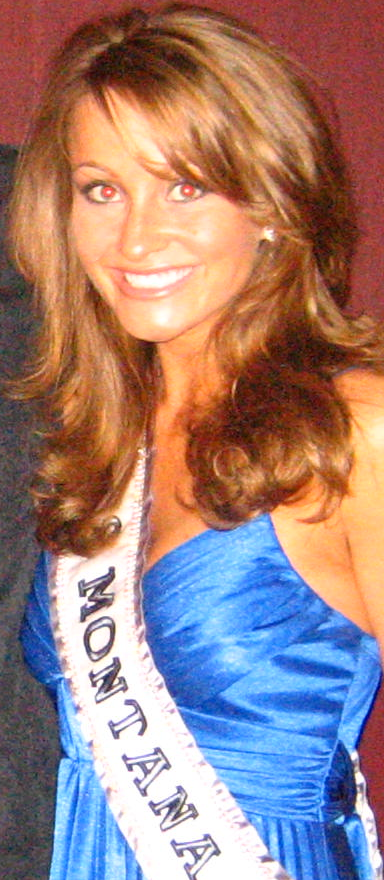
Tori Wanty, Miss Montana USA 2008

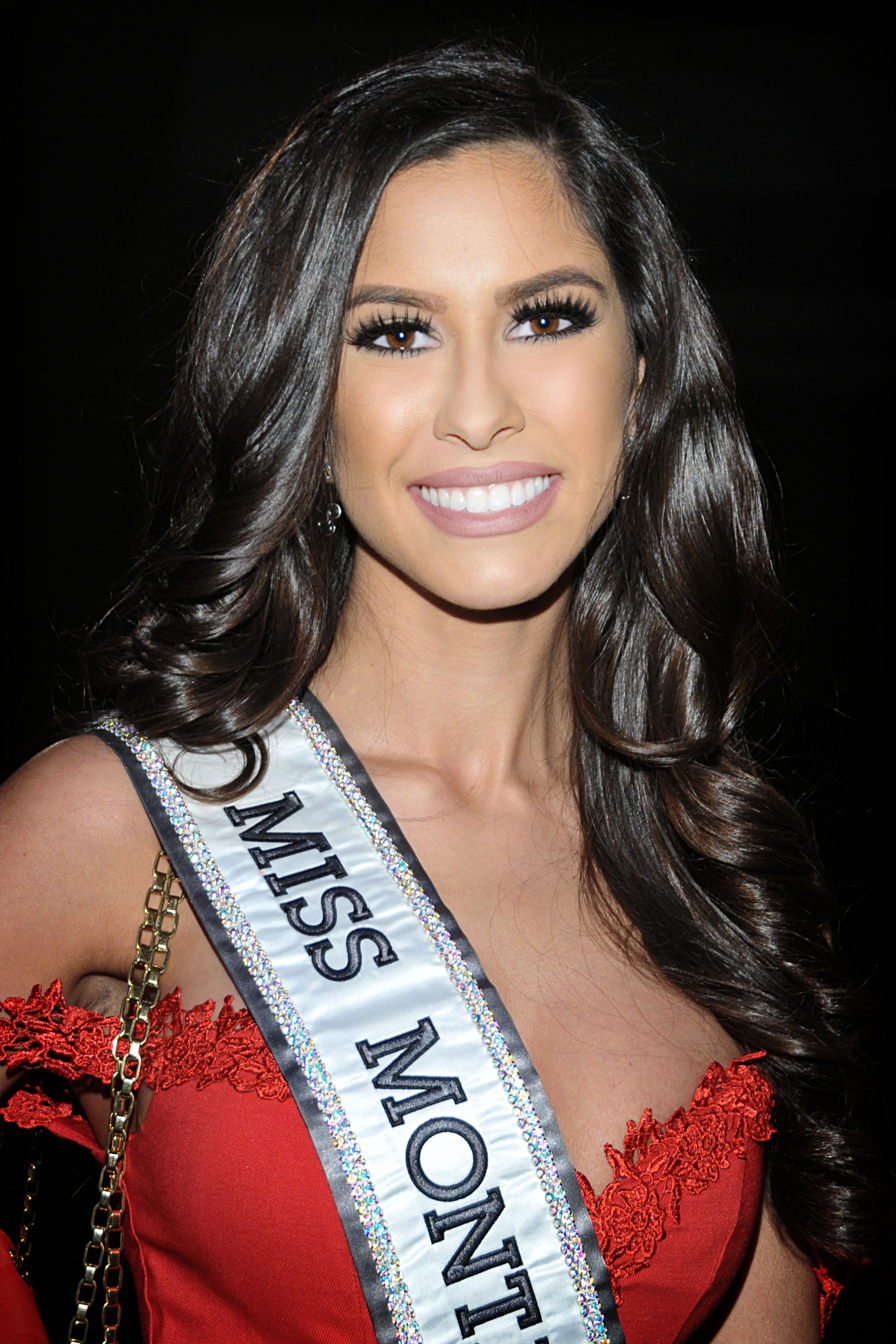
Sibahn Doxey, Miss Montana USA 2016

== Results summary ==
=== Placements ===
- Top 10: Valerie Jackson (1952)
- Top 15/20: Dawn Oney (1954), Sharon D. Tietjen (1958), Lisbeth Fernández (2026)

Montana holds a record of 4 placements at Miss USA.

=== Awards ===
- Miss Congeniality: Robbin English (1980), Meredith McCannel (2002), Stephanie Trudeau (2007)

== Winners ==
Color key

- Declared as Winner
- Ended as runner-up
- Ended as one of the finalists or semi-finalists

Year	Name	Hometown	Age^{1}	Local title	Placement at Miss USA	Special awards at Miss USA	Notes
2026	Lisbeth Fernández	Miami, FL	28	Miss Pinecrest	Top 20		
2025	Juliana Wilson	Nashville, TN	36	Miss Paradise Valley			First runner-up at Miss Montana USA 2024
2024	Shelby Dangerfield	Billings	30	Miss Billings			
2023	Madyson Rigg	Kalispell	26	Miss Glacier			
2022	Heather Lee O'Keefe	Bozeman	24				Expected to become the longest reigning titleholder at 1 year, 7 months and 25 days
2021	Jami Forseth	Huntley	23				Previously Miss Montana Teen USA 2016
2020	Merissa Underwood	Bozeman	27				
2019	Grace Zitzer	Dillon	27				
2018	Dani Walker	Billings	27	Miss Yellowstone County			Previously National American Miss California Jr. Teen 2006 & National American Miss California Teen 2009. Competed in Miss California USA several times.; Appeared on MTV reality show Parental Control
2017	Brooke Bezanson	Missoula	19	Miss Missoula County			
2016	Sibahn Doxey	Frenchtown	22	Miss West Valley			Previously Miss Montana Teen USA 2011
2015	Tahnee Peppenger	Great Falls	26				
2014	Kadie Latimer	Kalispell	23				
2013	Kacie West	Kalispell	23	Miss Flathead			Previously Miss Montana 2010
2012	Autumn Muller	Harlowton	25				Previously Miss Montana Teen USA 2004
2011	Brittany Wiser	Bozeman	23				Previously Miss Montana 2009.
2010	Elizabeth Anne Anseth	Billings	19				
2009	Misti Vogt	Kalispell	23				
2008	Tori Wanty	Shelby	21				
2007	Stephanie Trudeau	Saint Ignatius	20			Miss Congeniality	
2006	Jill McLain	Havre	21				
2005	Amanda Kimmel	Billings	20				Miss Earth USA 2005 and top 8 finalist at Miss Earth 2005, Survivor: China, Survivor: Micronesia, and Survivor: Heroes vs. Villains contestant.
2004	Molly Flynn	Townsend	22				
2003	Megan Monroe	Missoula	22				
2002	Meredith McCannel	Billings	20			Miss Congeniality	Miss Congeniality at National Sweetheart 2005 & Miss Congeniality at Miss Earth USA 2006
2001	CaCe Hardy	Kalispell	18				
2000	Brandi Bjorklund	Bonner					
1999	Michon Zink						
1998	Reno Wittman						
1997	Christin Didier	Lewistown	24			Honorable Mention	
1996	Tanya Pogatchnik		21				
1995	Angela Janich						
1994	Kelly Brown						
1993	Kristen Anderson	Columbia Falls					Previously Miss Montana Teen USA 1988
1992	Joy Estrada						
1991	Joann Kayleen Jorgensen	Helena	22				Later Miss Montana 1992
1990	Kimberlee Burger						
1989	Tammy Reiter	Billings					
1988	Kimberly Torp	Missoula					
1987	Constance "Connie" Colla	Great Falls					First runner-up at Miss Montana USA 1986
1986	Laurie Ryan	Belgrade	20				
1985	Julie Georgiana Knox	Columbus					
1984	Kristi Ogren	Frenchtown					
1983	Barbara Bowman	Great Falls					
1982	Pierrette "Perri" Stevenson	Bozeman	19				Second runner-up at Miss Montana USA 1981
1981	Cathi Jo Locati	Billings	19	Miss Eastern Montana			
1980	Robbin English	Great Falls				Miss Congeniality	
1979	Jurrette Sindelar	Billings					
1978	Susan Riplett	Billings					
1977	Theresa Rose Bajt	Billings					
1976	Teresa Jane Klaus	Great Falls					
1975	Suzanne DeMier	Great Falls					
1974	Carole Aalseth	Billings					
1973	Jeri Joy Shandorf	Missoula					
1972	Mitriann Popovich	Butte					
1971	Rebecca Lou Thomas	Billings					
1970	Moreen Ann Murphy	Helena					
1969	Christina Jovin	Missoula					
1968	Kerry Barker	Billings					
1967	Stevie M. Lahti	Wolf Creek	21				Later Miss Rodeo Montana 1967; Later participated in the 1968 Rose Parade
1966	Carol Marie Boetcher	Great Falls					
1965	Patricia Bradford						
1961–1964	Did Not Compete						
1960	Joanne Lane						
1959	Bar-beth Smith						
1958	Sharon D. Tietjen				Semi-finalist (Top 15)		Later Miss Montana 1959
1955–1957	Did Not Compete						
1954	Dawn Oney				Semi-finalist (Top 20)		
1953	Billie Jean Tyrrell						
1952	Valerie Jackson				Semi-finalist (Top 10)		
1951	Patricia McGinty						

^{1} Age at the time of the Miss USA pageant
