= Piano Sonatas Nos. 13 and 14 (Beethoven) =

Ludwig van Beethoven's opus number 27 is a set of two piano sonatas. They were published separately in March 1802. Both sonatas are entitled Sonata quasi una Fantasia, which roughly translated as sonatas in the style of a fantasia. The second sonata is one of the most famous piano works in the repertoire and often called the Moonlight sonata, a contentious name not given by the composer himself. The first sonata remains far less performed than the second and the two sonatas are not commonly performed together.

They are named so for their only loose adherence to the sonata form. The first movement of both sonatas are slow and lacking in full sonata form. The second movements are scherzos. The sonatas differ in structure in the third movement and only the first sonata has a fourth movement. In the first sonata, thematic material is referenced from one movement to the other which is also uncommon in a typical sonata of the time but more like the fantasia style.

They were written in 1801. For the individual sonatas see:

- Piano Sonata No. 13 in E♭ major
- Piano Sonata No. 14 (Moonlight sonata) in C♯ minor
