= Piano Sonata No. 24 (Beethoven) =

Piano sonata by Ludwig van Beethoven

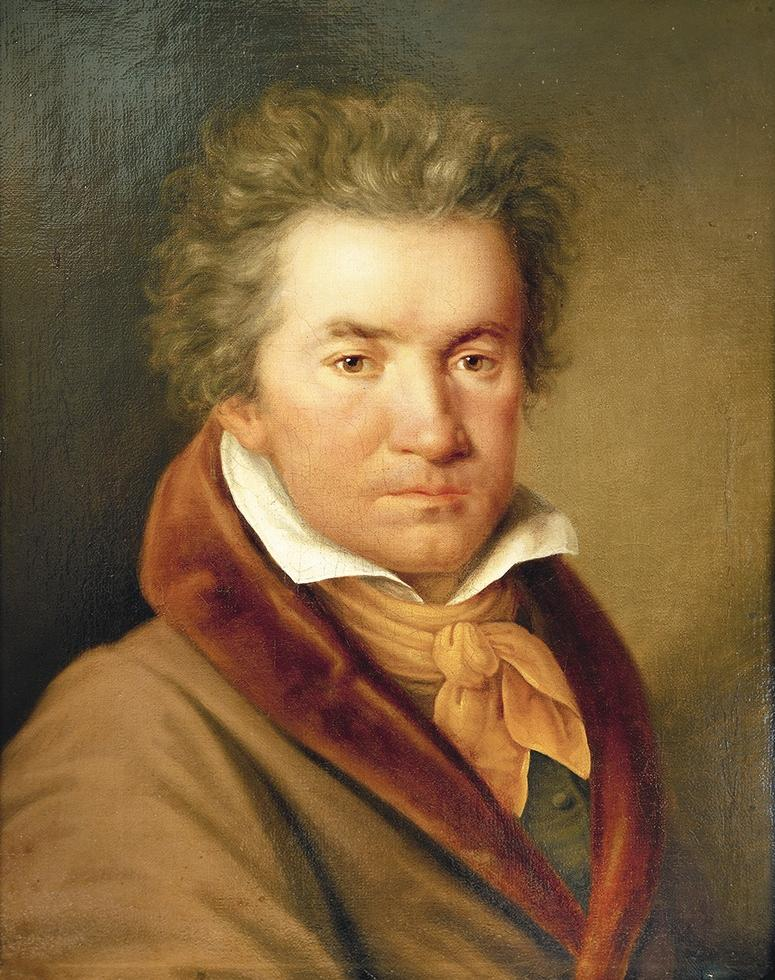
Beethoven in 1815; painted by Joseph Willibrord Mähler (1778–1860)

I. Adagio cantabile – Allegro ma non troppo

II. Allegro vivace
Played by Artur Schnabel in 1932

The Piano Sonata No. 24 in F♯ major, Op. 78, nicknamed "à Thérèse" (because it was written for Countess Thérèse von Brunswick) was written by Ludwig van Beethoven in 1809. It consists of two movements:

1. Adagio cantabile — Allegro ma non troppo
2. Allegro vivace

A typical performance takes about 11–12 minutes with repeats included. The second movement is a variation of the ending of the popular patriotic song "Rule, Britannia!" (to which Beethoven wrote a set of variations for piano in 1803).

According to Carl Czerny, Beethoven himself singled out this sonata and the "Appassionata" Sonata as favourites (once written, the "Hammerklavier" Sonata" would also become one of Beethoven's favourites).
