= Theresa Rose Bajt =

American clinical psychologist (born 1956)

- Born: April 5, 1956 (age 70); Joliet, Illinois, U.S.
- Education: Harvard University
- Occupation: Psychologist
- Spouse: Michael Powell (1989–present)
- Children: Christopher Powell; Jackson Powell

Theresa Rose Bajt (born April 5, 1956) is a former Miss Montana, and a clinical psychologist practicing in Creve Coeur, Missouri. She has also published several papers, and acted in a Dick Clark film of the week.

== Biography ==
Bajt was born on April 5, 1956, to Catholic parents in Joliet, Illinois. She comes from a large extended family in the United States. Her father's family, originally from Croatia, emigrated with two children, eventually expanding to 11. Her mother is of Polish and Russian descent, from a family that began with one child and grew to seven. Her sister Mary Lynn Bajt-Jaeschke is a research scientist.

Bajt's father worked for Olin Blockson for over 40 years. Sophia worked as a factory worker to help support the family and financially allow the girls to attend college. Neither parent had a high school diploma.

Bajt attended the University of Dayton for two years. She then transferred to Rocky Mountain College in Billings, Montana. In 1977, while attending school she became Miss Montana U.S.A. She also was a cheerleader for Rocky Mountain College.

Her experience as Miss Montana was enough to get Bajt hired as a fundraiser for the Montana State Easter Seal Society. While at a fund raising event the projector broke and Theresa Rose began to ad lib for a half-hour. A hospital administrator was in the audience and was so impressed he offered her a position in marketing at St. Vincent Hospital in Billings, Montana. During her two years at the job she started working on her first master's degree. After finishing her master's degree from Montana State University she was employed as Director of Deferred Prosecution. She worked with first-time law offenders who were offered rehabilitation instead of prosecution. As she counseled the offenders to "Go for their dreams", she motivated herself to try for her own. She then moved to Los Angeles to pursue a career in acting and writing. Eventually, she landed a small role in the Dick Clark film of the week, Reaching for the Stars, in 1985. Later, Bajt decided to go back to school and was accepted at Harvard University in the master's degree program. She continued on to receive her Ph.D. degree from the University of Maryland. While attending the university she met her husband Michael Powell whom she married September 2, 1989

Bajt received the Impact Award, given annually to a woman whose early career artistic or scientific work significantly benefits children's lives or psychological welfare.

== Publishings ==
While in school at Harvard University Bajt published several papers. The first, When Laws and Values Conflict: A dilemma for Psychologists was co-written with Ken Pope, Ph.D., the paper covers the conflict a psychologist faces with the law running a private practice. For instance, the dilemma between revealing private information and reporting illegal activities such as child abuse or "potential harm to third parties."

A year later, she again co-authored a paper with Kenneth Pope, entitled Therapist-Patient Sexual Intimacy Involving Children and Adolescents. This paper studied the phenomenon of therapist-patient sexual intimacy and the degree to which is occurs. The paper concluded three suggestions. First, that people in the profession must take account of the fact that children and adolescents are involved in a number of abuse cases by a prior therapist, and the approaches to individual and group therapy for victims of therapist patient sexual relationships.

Bajt's research has been requested internationally and was cited in the New York Times article "When Do a Therapist's Actions Cross over the Line?" Bajt now currently resides with her family in Missouri. She has a private practice in Creve Coeur.

== Personal life ==
She was married for nearly 30 years to her husband, Dr. C. Michael Powell, Senior Vice President at United Healthcare's Optum Health, who died in 2015.

== Selected publications ==
- Bajt, Theresa Rose; Pope, Kenneth S. (1989). "Therapist-patient sexual intimacy involving children and adolescents". American Psychologist. 44 (2): 455. doi:10.1037/0003-066X.44.2.455.
- Pope, Kenneth S.; Bajt, Theresa R. (1988). "When laws and values conflict: A dilemma for psychologists". American Psychologist. 43 (10): 828–829. doi:10.1037/0003-066X.43.10.828.
