= Miss Montana's Teen =

Teen beauty pageant in the U.S. state of Montana

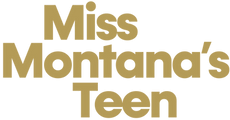
- Formation: 2005
- Type: Beauty pageant
- Location: Billings, Montana
- Executive Director: Danette Sawin
- President: Wesley Miller Smith
- Co-Executive Director/Producer: Stacie West
- Website: Official website

The Miss Montana's Teen competition is the pageant that selects the representative for the U.S. state of Montana in the Miss America's Teen pageant. This competition is part of the Miss America system.

Harper Harryman of Butte was crowned Miss Montana's Teen on May 30, 2026, at The Mother Lode Theatre in Butte, Montana. She competed for the title of Miss America's Teen 2027 on September 5, 2026, at the Kravis Center for the Performing Arts in West Palm Beach, Florida.

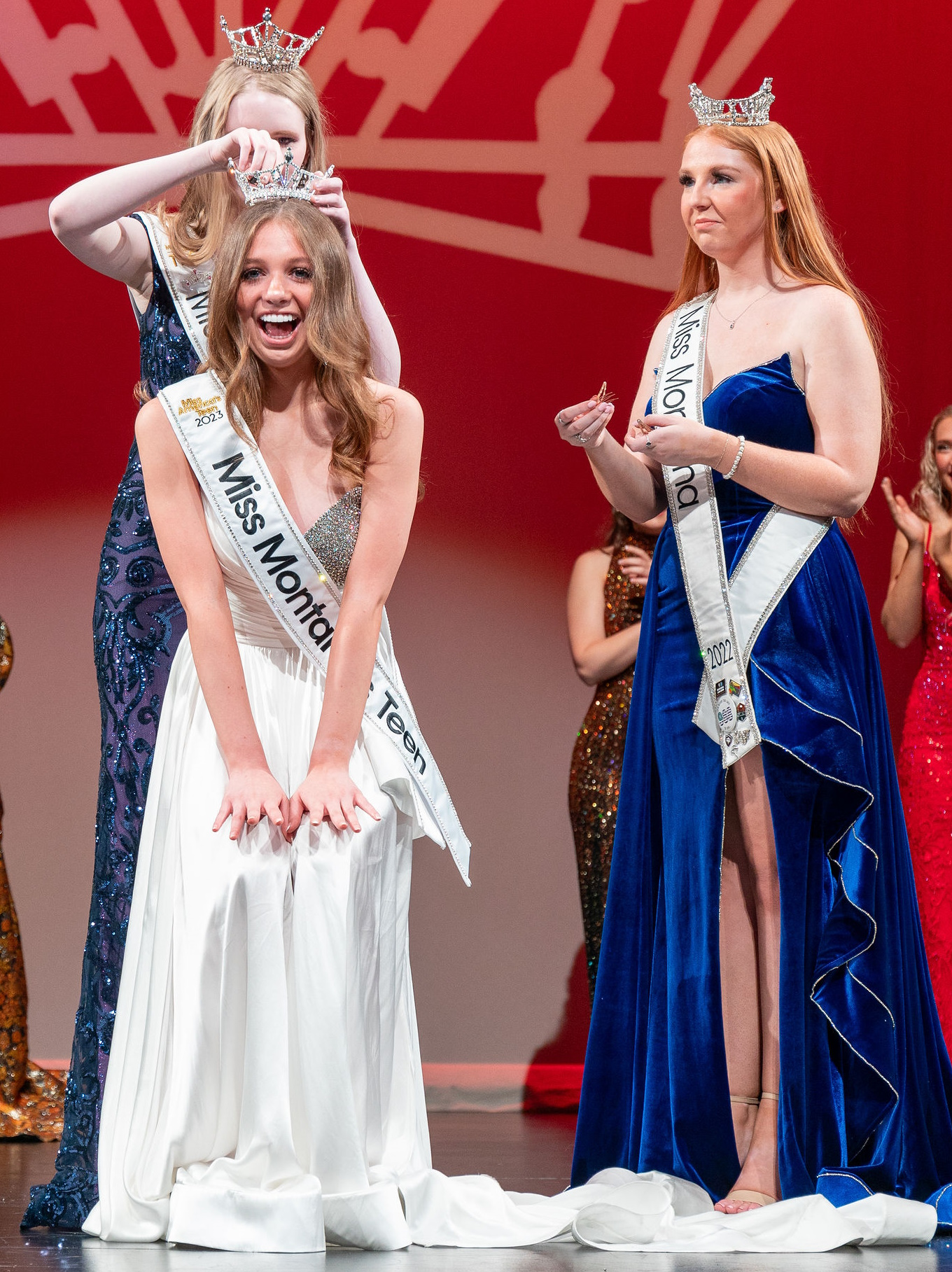
Julia Kunau, Miss Montana's Teen 2023

== Results summary ==
The results of Miss Montana's Teen as they participated in the national Miss America's Teen competition. The year in parentheses indicates the year of the Miss America's Teen competition the award/placement was garnered.

=== Placements ===
- Top 15: Amy Fox (2011)

=== Awards ===
==== Other awards ====
- Teens in Action Finalist: Annika Bennion (2021), Brontë Bennion (2022)
- Top Advertisement Sales: Annika Bennion (2021) (tie)
- AHA Go Red For Women Leadership Award: Emma McPherson (2025)

== Winners ==
- Declared as winner
- Ended as a runner-up
- Ended as a finalist or semi-finalist

Year	Name	Hometown	Age	Talent	Placement at MAO Teen	Special scholarships at MAO Teen	Notes
2026	Harper Harryman	Butte	16	Tap Dance			
2025	Marygrace Knuffke	Kalispell	17	Ballet en Pointe			
2024	Emma McPherson	Savage	15	Tap - Get Up Offa that Thing		AHA Go Red for Women Leadership Award	Miss Richland County's Teen
2023	Julia Kunau	Lewistown	17	Dance - Hallalueuh			Miss Lewiston's Teen; Previously Miss Montana Teen USA 2022
2022	Bronté Bennion	Sidney		Violin		Teens in Action Finalist	Sisters Daughters of Miss New Mexico USA 1993, Daniela Johnson Bennion
2020–2021 (Note: State competition took place in 2020, as national pageant postponed to 2021 for the 2022 edition due to the COVID-19 pandemic.)	Annika Bennion	Sidney	17	Violin, "Yankee Doodle, Op. 17"		Teens in Action Finalist Top Advertisement Sales (tie)	Sisters Daughters of Miss New Mexico USA 1993, Daniela Johnson Bennion
2019	Karsen Murphy	Glendive	17	Lyrical Dance, "Uphill Battle"			
2018	Cammy Heck	Sidney	17	Tap Dance			
2017	Alexa Baisch	Glendive	17	Dance			Miss Montana 2022
2016	Faith Johnson	Helena	16	Vocal, “I’m Not Alone” from Carrie			Miss Montana 2023
2015	Katee Orr	Missoula	17	Operatic Vocal			
2014	Haylee Storlie	Glendive	17	Lyrical Dance			
2013	Tessa Shelton	Billings	17	Vocal			
2012	Moira Shea	Helena	15	Vocal, "Pulled" from The Addams Family			Later Miss Montana 2019
2011	Jalyssa Gorder	Sidney	15	Lyrical Dance			
2010	Amy Fox	Belgrade	15	Piano	Top 15		
2009	Alysse Charlesworth	Glendive	15	Tap Dance			1st runner-up at Miss North Dakota 2018 pageant 1st runner-up at Miss Montana 2012 and 2016 pageants
2008	Victoria Valentine	Missoula	16	Vocal			Later Miss Montana 2014
2007	Chantell Bury	Glendive	16	Piano			3rd runner-up at Miss Montana 2009 and 2013 pageants
2006	Holly Matz	Missoula	16	Jump Rope Routine			1st runner-up at Miss Montana 2009 pageant
2005	Jacqueline Irigoin	Lambert	17	Tap Dance			
