= Piano Sonata No. 13 (Beethoven) =

Piano sonata by Beethoven, composed 1800-01

Piano Sonata No.13
- by Ludwig van Beethoven
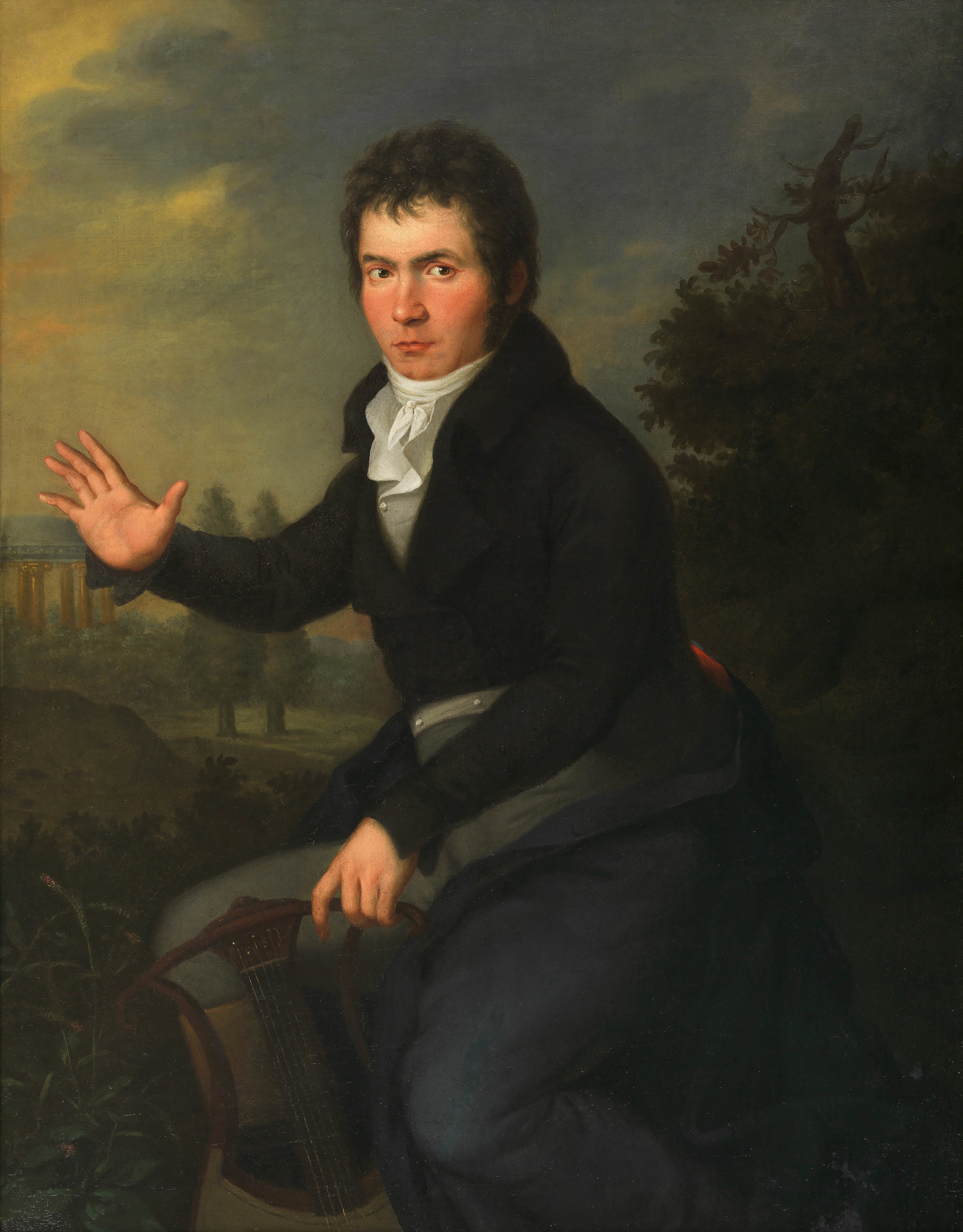
- Portrait of Beethoven (age 33) with a lyre-guitar by Joseph Willibrord Mähler (c. 1804)
- Key: E♭ major
- Opus: 27/1
- Composed: 1800–01
- Duration: 15 minutes
- Movements: 3 or 4, depending on edition

Piano Sonata No. 13 in E♭ major, Op. 27 No. 1, "Quasi una fantasia", is a sonata composed by Ludwig van Beethoven in 1800–01.

== Composition and publication ==
Beethoven was about 30 years old when he wrote the sonata. He had already made a name for himself in Vienna as pianist and composer and was beginning to explore alternatives to the classical-era compositional procedures that he had largely adhered to during the 18th century. The most famous works of his "middle period", often emphasizing heroism, were yet to come.

Beethoven's sketches for the first, second, and final movements survive, but the original autograph copy is lost. The sonata was published separately from its more famous companion, Op. 27 No. 2 (the "Moonlight" Sonata), but at the same time, by Cappi in Vienna; the first advertisements for the work appeared 3 March 1802. Both Op. 27 sonatas were originally titled Sonata quasi una fantasia.

The dedicatee of the work was (as was typical of the time) an aristocrat, Princess Josephine von Liechtenstein. Little is known of Beethoven's relationship with her.

=== Quasi una fantasia ===
Grove Music Online translates the Italian title Sonata quasi una fantasia as "sonata in the manner of a fantasy". While we cannot know precisely why Beethoven used this description for the two Op. 27 sonatas, several explanations are available. In the case of the present work (though not its companion), the entire sonata is played continuously without pauses between movements, in the manner of most fantasias. The movements are not in the usual order for a sonata: the opening movement is a slow movement and the scherzo and slow movement are in inverted order. The first movement is not in sonata form, as is true for most sonatas. As Kenneth Drake has pointed out, the movements are in extreme contrast with each other, a common trait of the sections of a fantasia. Lastly, the appearance of a quotation from one movement within another (here, from the third movement within the fourth) is a form of freedom not ordinarily employed in classical sonatas.

Several of these patterns are mentioned in Lewis Lockwood's discussion of the aesthetics of Beethoven's "quasi una fantasia" works:

The result of the "attacca" principle [i.e. performance of all movements without pause] is the blurring of the concept of each movement as an autonomous whole ... Instead, the "attacca" connections force attention on to the totality of the entire composition, with its transitions from movement to movement, and thus from one sharply defined affect to another. ... This is even more true when, as in [the present sonata], there is also a cyclic return of earlier material later in the sonata, which thus aims to integrate its movements into a unified cycle.

— Lockwood 1996, 11

== Music ==
I. Andante – Allegro – Andante

II. Allegro molto e vivace

III. Adagio con espressione

IV. Allegro vivace
Performed by Artur Schnabel in 1932

The Op. 27 No. 1 sonata is laid out in four movements:

1. Andante – Allegro – Andante, in five-part rondo form (ABACA); in E♭ major, second episode (C) in C major.
2. Allegro molto e vivace, in C minor is in a modified scherzo form, trio section in A♭ major.
3. Adagio con espressione, in A♭ major; also in ternary form (ABA)
4. Allegro vivace, in E♭ major, in sonata rondo form (ABACABA)

=== I. Andante – Allegro – Andante ===
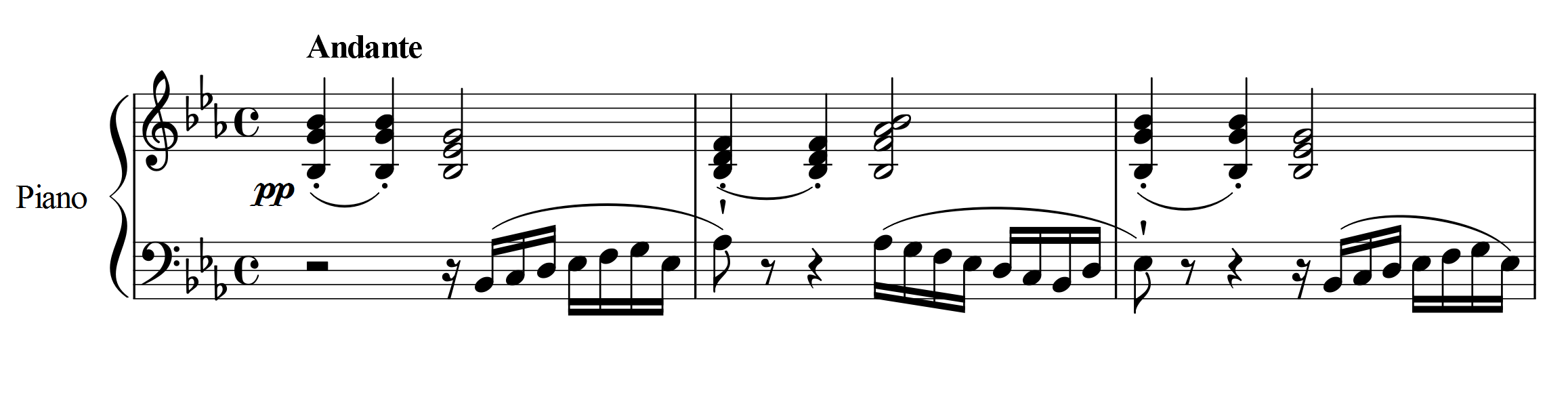

The first movement is in five-part rondo form instead of sonata form, unusual for Beethoven. The tempo is slow, interrupted by a fast medial section in the submediant, C major.

=== II. Allegro molto e vivace ===
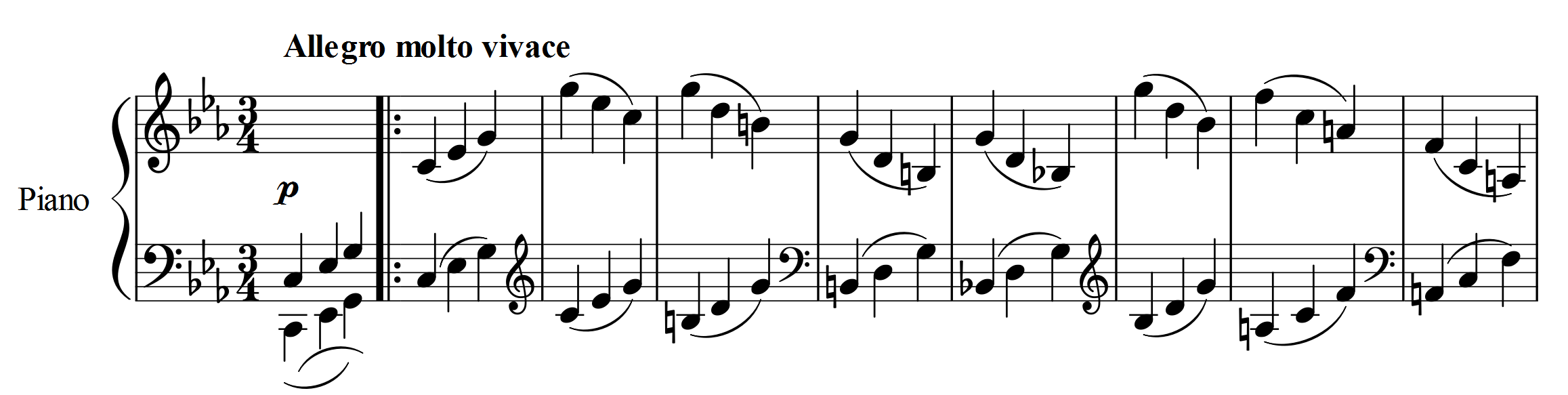

The second movement is a scherzo and is in ternary form (the norm for scherzi). Beethoven specifically notates the first phrase to start in the second bar. The main theme consists of mostly quarter notes in parallel octaves. Inside the theme, the first 16 bars are repeated outside an 8-bar middle strain. When it returns following the trio section, the left hand plays staccato and the notes of the right hand part (still legato) are offset half a beat later. The movement includes a brief coda and concludes on the chord C major, a Picardy third.

=== III. Adagio con espressione ===
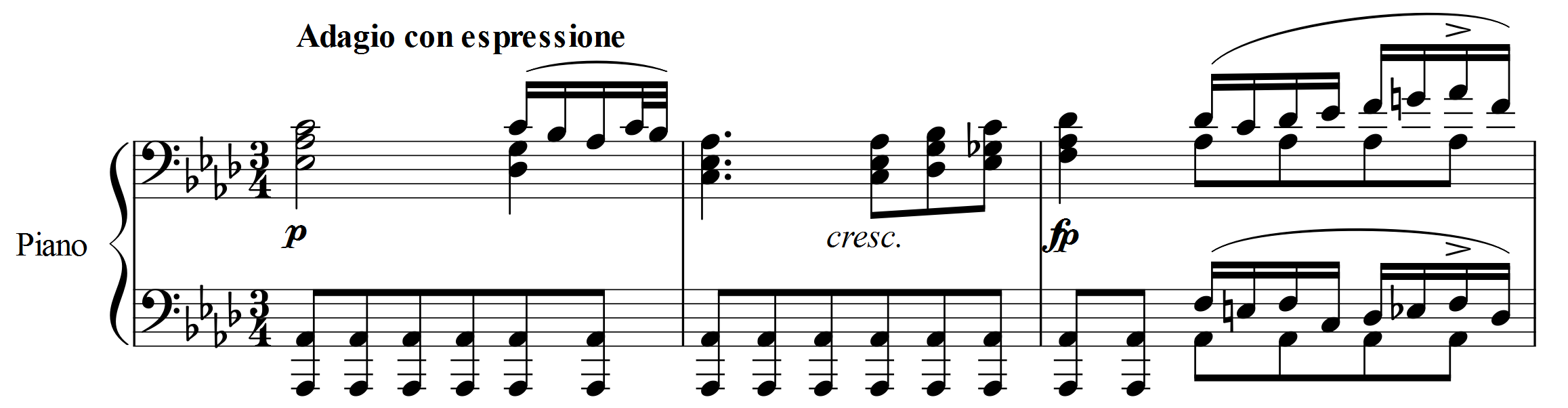

The third movement is slow in tempo and features a lyrical, noble theme, set against an eighth note accompaniment (in the recapitulation, sixteenth notes). The movement does not conclude in its tonic key, but instead reaches a final cadenza (on the dominant seventh) that leads directly to the finale. The movement is brief and thus might be heard by some listeners as an introduction to the final movement rather than as an independent movement, as Jonathan Del Mar suggests.

=== IV. Allegro vivace ===
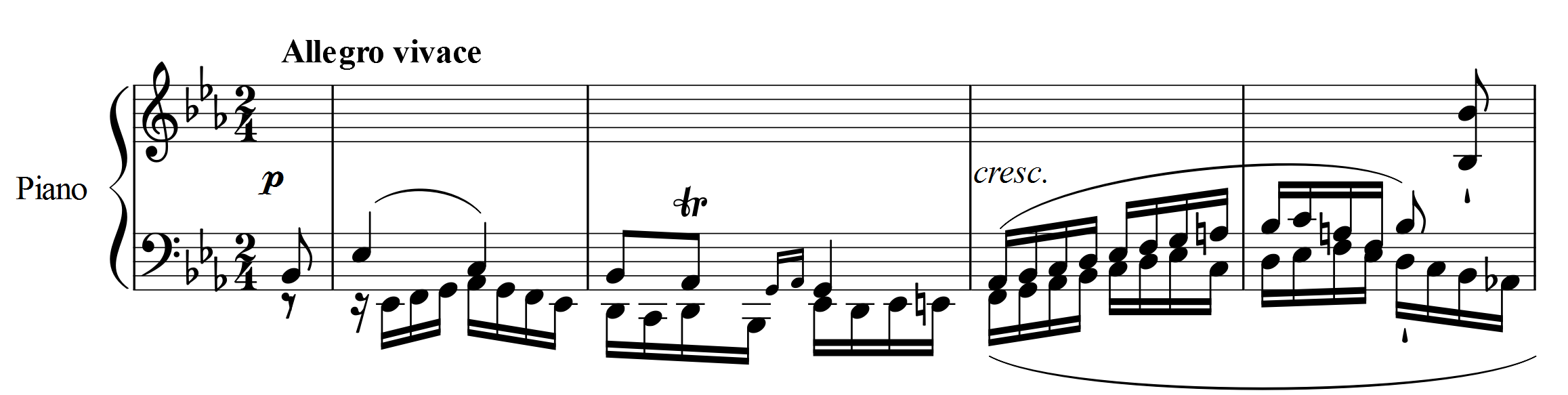

The finale is the most extended movement of the work. Charles Rosen notes, "With this movement, Beethoven began an experiment, to which he continued to return and develop through the years, of displacing some of the weight of the work from the opening movement to the finale". The work is in fast tempo and in sonata rondo form. After the second B section, the main theme of the slow movement briefly returns, followed by a brief cadenza. There follows the final A section, marked Presto.

A typical performance of the work lasts 15 minutes.
