= Alexis Wineman =

American autism advocate and beauty queen

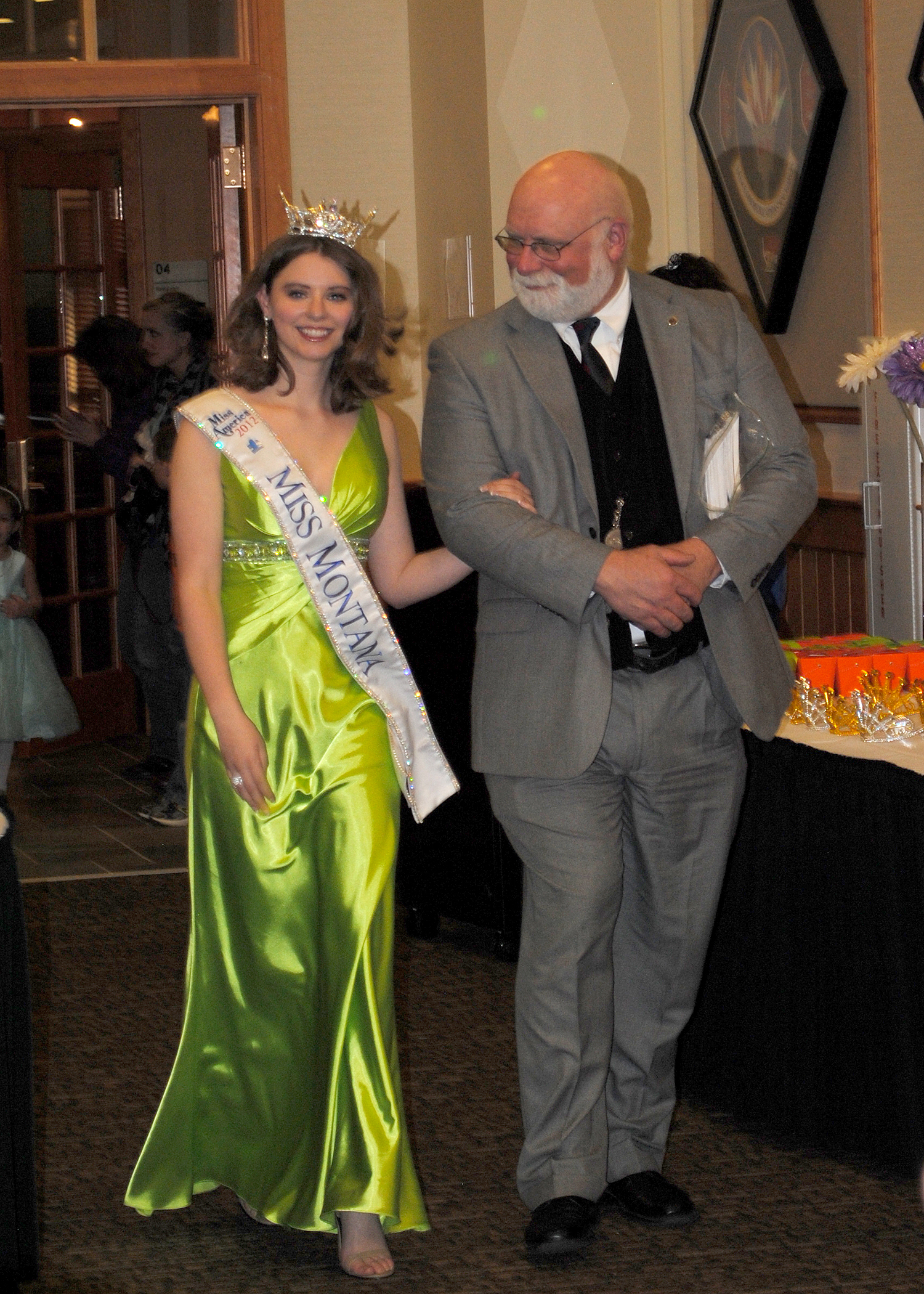
- Education: Huntingdon College
- Known for: First known autistic contestant to compete in the Miss America pageant.
- Title: Miss Cut Bank 2012; Miss Montana 2012
- Awards: Miss America 2013 "America's Choice" award
- Website: www.alexiswineman.com

Alexis Wineman is an autism advocate who was named Miss Montana 2012. She won the "America's Choice" award at the Miss America 2013 pageant and is the first known autistic contestant to compete in the Miss America pageant.

== Background ==
Wineman is from Cut Bank, Montana, and states that as a child, she always felt different and was bullied. She said that she began to understand why after she was diagnosed with "PDD-NOS (Pervasive Developmental Disorder- Not Otherwise Specified), an autism spectrum disorder" at the age of 11. She attended Huntingdon College in Montgomery, Alabama, and graduated in 2017 with a degree in art. She currently lives in Montgomery, Alabama and works at a daycare out of a church. Alexis still offers speaking events, but hasn't been getting many since graduating college.

Wineman did not grow up with an interest in beauty pageants, stating that she was instead the "girl with the hoodies on. I never wore makeup all that much. I wasn't much into beauty at all – to be honest, I'm still not all that much." Her platform as Miss Montana was "Normal is just a dryer setting – Living with autism" and, at the age of 18, she was the youngest contestant in the Miss America 2013 pageant.

Her older sister, Danielle Wineman, was named Miss Montana in June 2015.

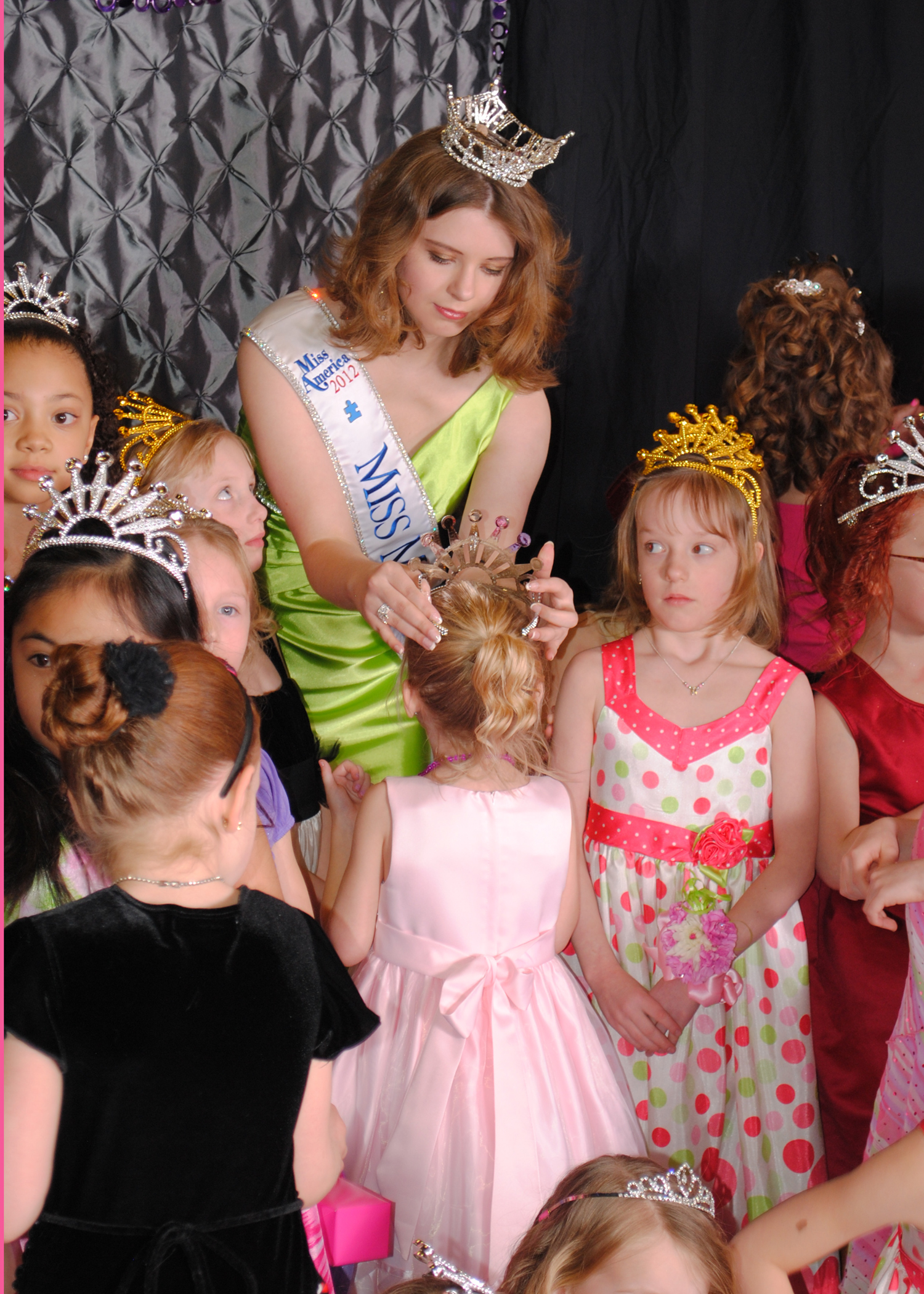
Wineman at a Malmstrom AFB appearance

== Publications ==
- Wineman, Alexis. (January 17, 2013). "Miss Montana: Autism doesn't define me". CNN.

== Video clips and interviews ==
- Vote for Miss Montana 2012 Alexis Wineman - Miss America Organization
- Miss America Contestant Makes History - ABC News
- Person of the Week: Miss Montana Alexis Wineman - ABC News

Awards and achievements
| Preceded by Veronika Ohlinger | Miss Montana; 2012 | Succeeded by Sheridan Pope |
