= Josephine Brunsvik =

Hungarian noble (1779 – 1821)

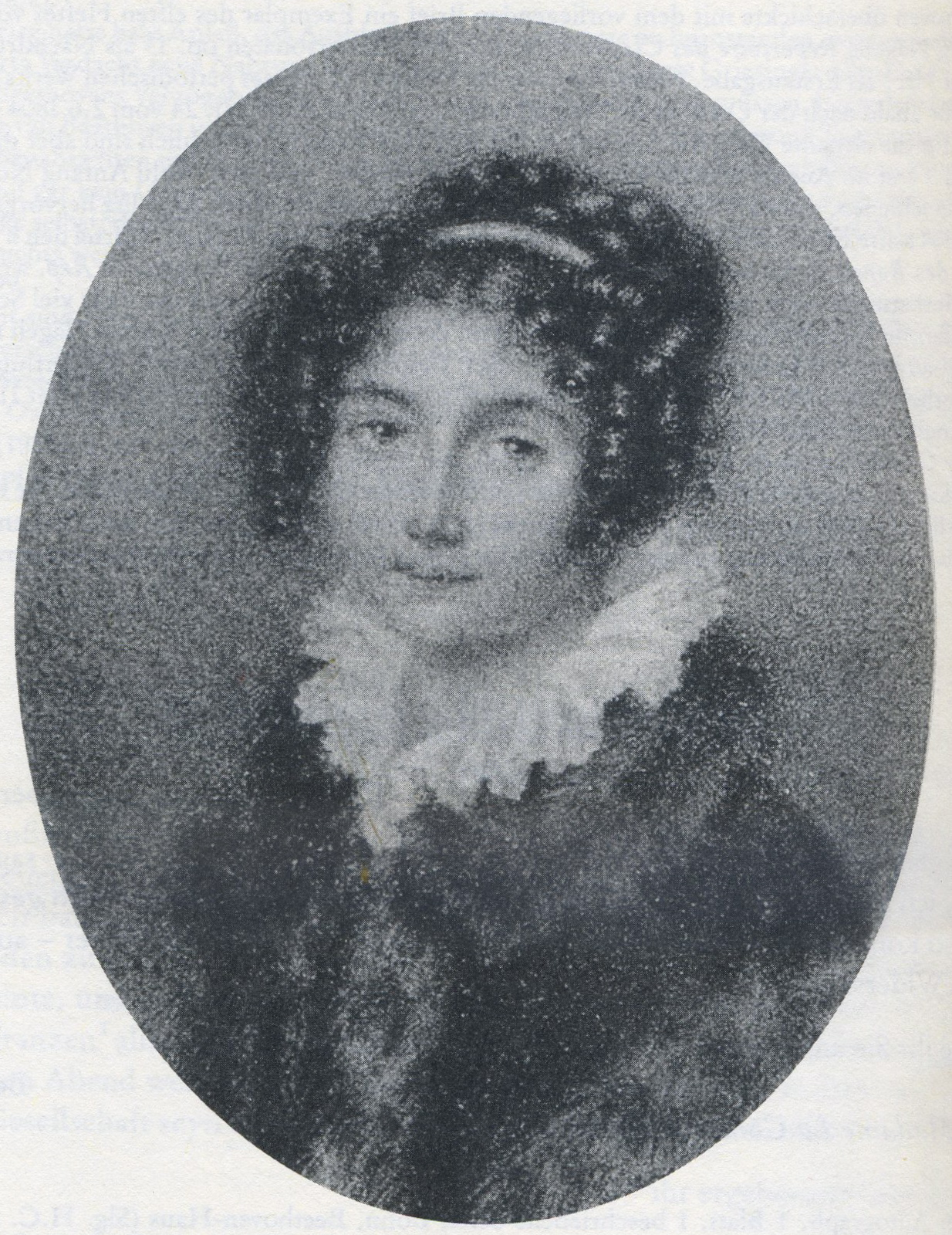
Josephine Brunszvik, miniature drawn by pencil, before 1804.

Josephine Brunsvik or Countess Jozefina Brunszvik de Korompa, Countess Josephine Deym, (Hungarian: Brunszvik Jozefina; 28 March 1779 – 31 March 1821) was probably the most important woman in the life of Ludwig van Beethoven, as documented by at least 15 love letters he wrote her where he called her his "only beloved", being "eternally devoted" to her and "forever faithful”. Several musicologists consider her to be the most likely recipient of the mysterious "Letter to the Immortal Beloved".

== Early life and first marriage ==
Josephine Countess von Brunsvik was born on 28 March 1779 in Preßburg (now Bratislava in Slovakia), then part of the Kingdom of Hungary. Her father Anton died in 1792, leaving his wife Anna (née von Seeberg) with four young children; the other three were Therese (1775–1861), the first-born, Franz (1777–1849), the only son and sole heir, and Charlotte (1782–1843). The Brunsviks lived in a magnificent castle in Martonvásár near Budapest; the family also had a castle in Korompa (Dolna Krupa in Slovakia).

The children grew up enjoying an education by private teachers, studying languages and classic literature; all four turned out to be talented musicians: Franz became a distinguished violoncellist, the girls excelled at the piano – most of all, Josephine. They admired especially the music of Ludwig van Beethoven, who during the 1790s had established himself as a star pianist in the Austrian capital of Vienna.

In May 1799, Anna took Therese and Josephine to Vienna to ask Beethoven to give her daughters piano lessons. Beethoven later admitted that he had to suppress his love of Josephine, and she felt "enthusiastic" about him. However, it was to the much older Joseph Count Deym (born 1752) that she was given in marriage – her mother needed a wealthy son-in-law of equal social standing. After some initial (mainly financial) difficulties, the Deyms developed a reasonably happy relationship, and Beethoven, continuing as Josephine's piano teacher, was a regular visitor. Josephine gave birth to three children in quick succession, and was pregnant with the fourth, when Count Deym died suddenly of pneumonia in January 1804.

== Widowhood ==
Beethoven continued to see the young widow frequently (rather too frequently, as sister Charlotte soon observed,) and wrote her more and more passionate love letters (of which 15 have survived, though not published before 1957).

Josephine replied in kind (none of her actual letters have survived, but only a few drafts she kept), but was obviously keen to keep the romance a secret. In March/April 1805, Beethoven went to great lengths to explain to Josephine that there was no need to worry after his patron Prince Lichnowsky had discovered the autograph of the song "An die Hoffnung" [To Hope] with the secret dedication to Josephine on Beethoven's desk (later published without dedication). Beethoven composed not only this song (Op. 32) but the intensely lyrical piano piece Andante favori WoO 57, a musical declaration of love, especially for Josephine (thought by some to have been intended as the original middle movement for the stormy Waldstein Sonata Op. 53, discarded for its sensuousness for an austere, introspective introduction to the concluding rondo finale).

The Brunsvik family increased the pressure to terminate the relationship. She could not contemplate marrying Beethoven, a commoner, for the simple reason that she would have lost the guardianship of her aristocratic children.

Towards the end of 1807, Josephine began to yield to the pressure by her family and withdrew from Beethoven; she was not at home when he came to see her. This was later misinterpreted as a "cooling down" of her love.

== Second marriage ==
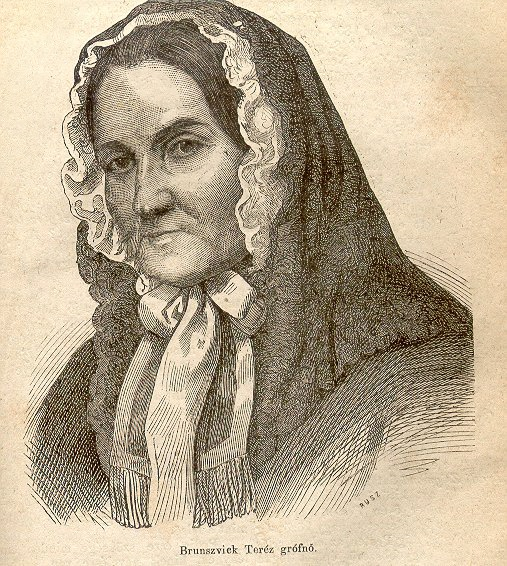
Therese Brunszvik, Josephine's elder sister.

In 1808, Therese joined her sister on a long journey that led them to Yverdon-les-Bains in Switzerland where they met the famous educator Pestalozzi, to find a teacher for Josephine's two school-age sons. The man recommended to them was the Estonian baron Christoph von Stackelberg (1777–1841), who joined them on their return trip to Austria, via Geneva, southern France and Italy. During the winter of 1808/9 they crossed the Alps, and Josephine became seriously ill several times. From later diary notes by Therese and a letter by Stackelberg in 1815, it appears that Josephine was too weak to resist his amorous advances – with the result that she was pregnant when the two sisters returned, with Stackelberg, to Hungary in the summer of 1809.

Stackelberg, as a stranger of lower rank and not a Catholic, was immediately rejected by the status-conscious Brunsviks. Josephine's first child by Stackelberg, Maria Laura, was born in secret (December 1809). Mother Anna von Brunsvik very reluctantly gave her written consent to the marriage, not only to give the baby a father, but also because Stackelberg threatened to discontinue the education of the Deym children otherwise. The wedding took place without any guests in February 1810 in Esztergom (Gran), a Hungarian town.

Josephine's second marriage was unhappy from day one, and it only got worse. After a second daughter Theophile was born (exactly nine months after the wedding), she was ill again, and in 1811 Josephine decided not to sleep with Stackelberg any more. The couple also had strong disagreements about the methods of education. But the final straw, indeed the main reason for the irreversible breakdown, was the failed purchase of an expensive estate in Witschapp, Moravia, that Stackelberg could not manage to finance, and it resulted in their complete financial ruin.

== 1812 ==
After many lost lawsuits, nerve-wracking disputes and arguments that left Josephine in a desperate state of mind, Stackelberg left her (probably in June 1812, supposedly due to a sudden religious impetus, to find consolation in prayer and pious contemplation). This did not help Josephine, who needed money urgently, and she was in any case agonizing and suffering.

According to her diary entries in June 1812, Josephine clearly intended to go to Prague. At this stage, however, her and her sister Therese's diaries end abruptly and do not continue until about two months later.

Meanwhile, Beethoven traveled to Teplitz (Teplice) via Prague, where, on 3 July 1812, he must have met a woman he subsequently called his "Immortal Beloved" in a letter written on 6/7 July (which he kept to himself).

Josephine's main concern was to retain the custodianship of her four children by Deym, and she managed to find a new modus vivendi with her estranged husband in August 1812. The main point of this new marriage contract was that Stackelberg had it in writing that he could leave her any time – which he subsequently did when a daughter, Minona, was born on 8 April 1813 (it is possible he suspected she could not have been his child).

== Separation ==
In 1814, Stackelberg turned up again to pick up "his" children (including Minona). Josephine refused, so he called the police to remove the three toddlers forcefully. However, as it turned out, Stackelberg did not take the children to his home in Estonia – instead he went to travel the world again, having dumped them at a deacon's place in Bohemia.

Josephine, alone and increasingly ailing, "hired the dubious mathematics teacher Andrian [Karl Eduard von Andrehan-Werburg] ... she gradually fell under his charismatic spell, becoming pregnant and giving birth to Emilie [on 16 September 1815], hiding in a hut." Meanwhile, Stackelberg had made an inheritance (a brother had died) and came to Vienna, in April 1815, to fetch Josephine. Being pregnant and due to the long since irreparably broken relationship, she was not interested. Stackelberg reacted by writing her a long letter indicating how much he "despised" her, and also went to the police to slander her: a police report on 30 June 1815 about Josephine's "reputation" was possibly based on Stackelberg's report of an alleged incestuous incident among her children.

Josephine then threw out Andrian, who took over his illegitimate daughter and raised her alone (she died two years later of the measles). But as if this series of traumatic incidents was not enough, more heartbreak was to follow: Dechant Franz Leyer in Trautenau wrote her on 29 December 1815 that he had her three young daughters in his custody, but Stackelberg had long since stopped sending any money. Josephine and Therese – excited to hear of them again after almost two years - scraped together as much money as they could and sent it to Leyer, who soon afterward suggested they should take the children home to their mother where they belonged, given that their father had gone missing. Fate would have it that just when Josephine was certain to finally see her children again, Christoph von Stackelberg's brother Otto turned up in Trautenau to take them away.

There is evidence that both Josephine and Beethoven were in Baden in the summer of 1816 where they most likely met, and it even seems that they had planned it: Josephine had requested a passport to travel to the German spa of Bad Pyrmont but did not go there after all. Intriguingly, in August 1816, Beethoven made an entry in his Diary: "not to P – t, but with P. - discuss the best way how to arrange it."

== Death ==
Josephine's life ended in increasing agony and misery: the four Deym children, now teenagers, went their own ways (the boys joined the military, to the horror of their bed-ridden mother), the three daughters of the marriage with Stackelberg were gone, sister Therese withdrew, brother Franz stopped sending money, as did mother Anna who wrote Josephine a letter telling her that it was all her own fault.

Countess Josephine von Brunsvik died on 31 March 1821, at age 42. During this year, Beethoven composed his very last Piano Sonatas No. 31 (Op. 110) and No. 32 (Op. 111), described as 'like requiems' by musicologists, with discernible reminiscences to "Josephine's Theme", the Andante favori, which itself has been discerned to repeatedly chant Jo-se-phi-ne.

== Sources ==
- Beahrs, Virginia (1986): "The Immortal Beloved Revisited." The Beethoven Newsletter 1/2 (Summer), pp. 22–24.
- Beahrs, Virginia Oakley (1988): "The Immortal Beloved Riddle Reconsidered." Musical Times, Vol. 129, No. 1740 (Feb.), pp. 64–70.
- Beahrs, Virginia (1993): "Beethoven's Only beloved? New Perspectives on the Love Story of the Great Composer." Music Review 54, no. 3/4, pp. 183–197.
- Brandenburg, Sieghard (1996, ed.): Ludwig van Beethoven: Briefwechsel. Gesamtausgabe. [Ludwig van Beethoven: Letters & Correspondence. Complete Edition.] 8 vols. Munich: Henle.
- Czeke, Marianne (1938): Brunszvik Teréz grófno naplói és feljegyzései, vol. 1. [Countess Therese Brunsvik's Diaries and Notes.] Budapest.
- Dahlhaus, Carl (1991): Ludwig van Beethoven: Approaches to his Music. Oxford: Oxford University Press.
- Goldschmidt, Harry (1977): Um die Unsterbliche Geliebte. Ein Beethoven-Buch. Leipzig: Deutscher Verlag für Musik.
- Kaznelson, Siegmund (1954): Beethovens Ferne und Unsterbliche Geliebte. [Beethoven's Distant and Immortal Beloved.] Zürich: Standard.
- La Mara (1909): Beethovens Unsterbliche Geliebte. Das Geheimnis der Gräfin Brunsvik und ihre Memoiren. [Beethoven's Immortal Beloved. Countess Brunsvik's Secret and her Memoirs]. Leipzig: Breitkopf & Härtel.
- La Mara (1920): Beethoven und die Brunsviks. Nach Familienpapieren aus Therese Brunsviks Nachlaß. [Beethoven and the Brunsviks. According to Family Documents from Therese Brunsvik's Estate.] Leipzig: Siegel.
- Jean and Brigitte Massin (1970): Recherche de Beethoven. Paris: Fayard.
- Pichler, Ernst (1994): Beethoven. Mythos und Wirklichkeit. [Beethoven. Myth and Reality.] Vienna: Amalthea.
- Riezler, Walter (1962): Beethoven. Zürich: Atlantis (8th ed.). First published in 1936 (in German).
- Schmidt-Görg, Joseph (1957, ed.): Beethoven: Dreizehn unbekannte Briefe an Josephine Gräfin Deym geb. v. Brunsvik. [Beethoven: Thirteen Unknown Letters to Josephine Countess Deym née von Brunsvik.] Bonn: Beethoven-Haus. (Also contains several letters by Josephine.)
- Skwara, Dagmar/Steblin, Rita (2007): "Ein Brief Christoph Freiherr von Stackelbergs an Josephine Brunsvik-Deym-Stackelberg." [A Letter by Christoph Baron von Stackelberg to Josephine Brunsvik-Deym-Stackelberg.] Bonner Beethoven-Studien, vol. 6, pp. 181–187.
- Solomon, Maynard (2005, ed.): Beethovens Tagebuch 1812-1818. [Beethoven's Diary 1812–1818.] Bonn: Beethoven-Haus.
- Steblin, Rita(2002): "Josephine Gräfin Brunswick-Deyms Geheimnis enthüllt: Neue Ergebnisse zu ihrer Beziehung zu Beethoven." [Josephine Countess Brunsvik-Deym's Secret Revealed: New Results about her Relationship to Beethoven.] Österreichische Musikzeitschrift 57/6 (June), pp. 23–31.
- Steblin, Rita (2002): A History of Key Characteristics in the 18th and Early 19th Centuries. 2nd ed. (1st ed. 1983). University of Rochester Press.
- Steblin, Rita (2007): "'Auf diese Art mit A geht alles zugrunde.' A New Look at Beethoven's Diary Entry and the "Immortal Beloved." Bonner Beethoven-Studien, vol. 6, pp. 147–180.
- Steblin, Rita (2009): "Beethovens 'Unsterbliche Geliebte': des Rätsels Lösung." [Beethoven's "Immortal Beloved": the Riddle Solved.] Österreichische Musikzeitschrift 64/2, pp. 4–17.
- Tellenbach, Marie-Elisabeth (1983): Beethoven und seine "Unsterbliche Geliebte" Josephine Brunswick. Ihr Schicksal und der Einfluß auf Beethovens Werk. Zürich: Atlantis.
- Tellenbach, Marie-Elisabeth (1987): "Beethoven and the Countess Josephine Brunswick." The Beethoven Newsletter 2/3, pp. 41–51.
- Tellenbach, Marie-Elisabeth (1988): "Künstler und Ständegesellschaft um 1800: die Rolle der Vormundschaftsgesetze in Beethovens Beziehung zu Josephine Gräfin Deym." [Artists and the Class Society in 1800: the Role of Guardianship Laws in Beethoven's Relationship to Josephine Countess Deym.] Vierteljahrschrift für Sozial- und Wirtschaftsgeschichte 2/2, pp. 253–263.
- Tellenbach, Marie-Elisabeth (1992): 'Beethovens Schülerin Josephine Brunswick, oder warum seine "Unsterbliche Geliebte" ihn nicht geheiratet hat' [Beethoven's Pupil Josephine Brunsvik, or Why His "Immortal Beloved" Did Not Marry Him]. In: Hoffmann, Freia & Rieger, Eva (ed.): Von der Spielfrau zur Performance-Künstlerin: Auf der Suche nach einer Musikgeschichte der Frauen [From the Playing Woman to the Performance Artist: In Search of a Musical History of Women]. Kassel: Furore, pp. 61–75.
- Tellenbach, Marie-Elisabeth (1993/1994): "Psychoanalysis and the Historiocritical Method: On Maynard Solomon's Image of Beethoven." In: The Beethoven Newsletter 8/3, pp. 84–92; 9/3, pp. 119–127.
- Tellenbach, Marie-Elisabeth (1996): 'Noch eine Geliebte Beethovens gefunden – oder erfunden? Zu Klaus Martin Kopitz: "Sieben volle Monate": Beethoven und Theresa von Zandt' [Yet Another Beloved of Beethoven Found – or Invented? About Klaus Martin Kopitz: "Seven Whole Months": Beethoven and Theresa von Zandt]. In: Musica Germany 50/2, pp. 78–83.
- Tellenbach, Marie-Elisabeth (1998): "Psychoanalyse und historisch-philologische Methode. Zu Maynard Solomons Beethoven- und Schubert-Deutungen" [Psychoanalysis and Historiocritical Method. On Maynard Solomon's Interpretations of Beethoven and Schubert]. In: Analecta Musicologica 30/II, pp. 661–719.
- Tellenbach, Marie-Elisabeth (1999): "Die Bedeutung des Adler-Gleichnisses in Beethovens Brief an Therese Gräfin Brunswick. Ein Beitrag zu seiner Biographie" [The Meaning of the Eagle Allegory in Beethoven's Letter to Therese Countess Brunsvik. A Contribution to his Biography]. In Die Musikforschung 4.
