= Wineman =

Wineman is a surname. Notable people with the surname include:

- Alexis Wineman (born 1994), American beauty pageant titleholder and autism advocate
- Danielle Wineman (born 1991 or 1992), American actress and beauty pageant titleholder, sister of Alexis
- Vivian Wineman, British lawyer and Jewish community activist

== See also ==
- Bangs-Wineman Block
- Wineman's, a former Southern California department store chain
