= Therese Brunsvik =

Hungarian noblewoman and pedagogue (1775–1861)

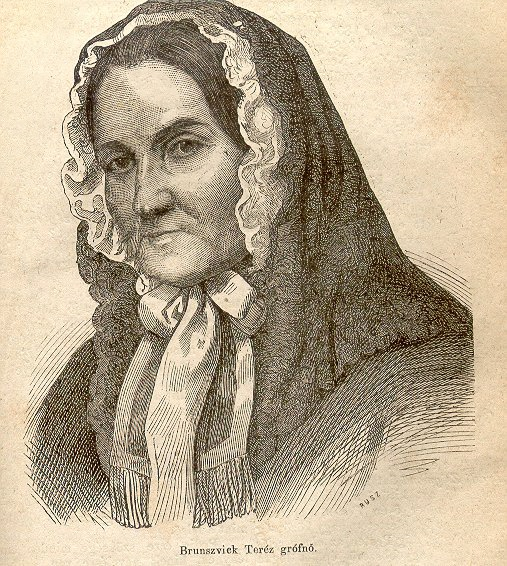
Therese Brunszvik

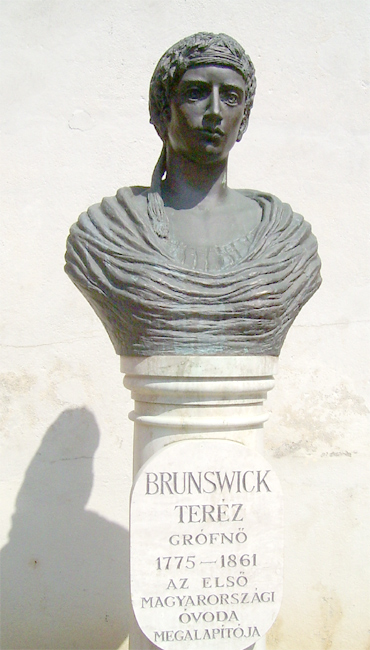
A bust of Therese Brunsvik

Countess Therese (von) Brunsvik (Hungarian: Teréz Brunszvik; July 27, 1775 in Pozsony, Kingdom of Hungary – September 23, 1861 in Pest, Kingdom of Hungary), sometimes referred to in English as Therese, Countess von Brunsvik or Brunswick, was a member of the Hungarian nobility, pedagogue and a follower of the Swiss pedagogue Pestalozzi.

== Early life ==
She was born as the eldest child and eldest daughter of Hungarian Count, Anton Brunszvik de Korompa (1746–1793) and his wife, Baroness Anna Barbara Wanckel von Seeberg (1752–1830). Her siblings were Count Franz (1779–1854), Countess Maria Josefa (1779–1821), Countess Josephine, and Countess Charlotte (1780–1843).

== Biography ==
She was the founder of nursery schools in Hungary on July 1, 1828, after Robert Owen's example set in New Lanark, Scotland in 1816. Soon the pre-school institution became famous all over Hungary and in 1837, Friedrich Fröbel founded the first "kindergarten" in Germany.

One of Ludwig van Beethoven's students, Therese was the dedicatee for his Piano Sonata No. 24 (in F♯ major, Opus 78), and some writers speculated that she—not her sister Josephine who is generally accepted as the addressee—may have been the intended recipient of Beethoven's letter to the "Immortal Beloved". Her memoirs were first published by La Mara, who subscribed to this theory. and her diaries and notes (up to 1813) by Marianne Czeke, both claiming to reveal much about the relations between Beethoven and the Brunsvik family, in particular her sister Josephine.
