= Karl August Walther =

German writer and publisher

Karl August Walther (30 April 1902 – after 1964) was a German writer and publisher.

== Life ==
Born in Bielefeld, Walther was a member of the editorial staff of the cultural magazine Der Türmer, which was published under the direction of Friedrich Lienhard who was positioned as völkisch. Walther became increasingly radicalised and became a member of the Nazi Militant League for German Culture.

Walther was one of the visitors of the Lippoldsberger Dichtertage organised by Hans Grimm.

From 1931 to 1936, Walther published the monthly religious and nationalist NS magazine Der Hochwart, whose editors included Robert Hohlbaum, Curt Hotzel and Börries von Münchhausen, and in which contributions and articles were published e.g. by Herbert Böhme, Georg Grabenhorst, Walter Ehrenstein, Otto Everling, Heinz Grothe, Otto Heuschele, Robert Saitschick and Heinz Steguweit. At times, the journal was subtitled "Monatsschrift für nationalsozialistische Lebensauffassung" (Monthly Journal for National Socialist views of life) and stated as its goal "to eradicate the destructive spirit of materialism". Walther's journal played an important pivotal role between national conservatives authors and the more radical National Socialist Cultural Revolutionaries.

In 1932, Walther proposed the construction of an open-air stage at the foot of the Wartburg, for which he received support from the reußischen Erbprinz Heinrich XLV. and also from Alfred Rosenberg and Walter Stang, so that the laying of the foundation stone of the "Wartburg-Waldbühne" took place in the same year. Walther received further support from Hans von der Gabelentz, the Wartburg's castle governor. After the Machtergreifung, construction was accelerated and the stage opened on 20 April 1933 with a performance of Hanns Johst's play Schlageter.

Walther moved to Potsdam and became treasurer of the newly founded Reichsverband Deutscher Schriftsteller. The "Wartburg-Waldbühne", of which Walther was chairman, regularly hosted concerts and theatre performances until it was destroyed in the war.

After the Second World War, Walther emigrated to Lucerne in Switzerland, where he was the owner of the Montana publishing house.

In 1950, Walther met Konrad Adenauer and later organised his visit to the place of pilgrimage Sachseln.

== Publications ==
- Jugendwandern, romantische Dichtung, 1921/24
- Vom Ehrenhain in Bad Berka, 1926
- Vom Reichsehrenmal, zus. m. Cornelius Gurlitt and Johannes Kess, 1926
- Das Erbe der Väter, Wegweiser zum Geistesvermächtnis Deutschen Führertums, zus. m. Albert Böhme, 1928
- Das Langemarck-Buch der Deutschen Studentenschaft, 1931
- Die Wartburgwaldbühne in Eisenach, 1933
- Neues Volk auf alter Erde, 1935
- Deutsches Volk in Arbeit und Wehr, 1937
- Obwaldner Land – kommt zu rasten und zu schauen, with Josef Garovi, 1950
- Vom Meer zum Bodensee, Der Hochrhein als Großschiffahrtsweg, 1957
- Wasser – bedrohtes Lebenselement, 1964
- Persönliche Erinnerungen von Karl August Walther – Zu Gast bei Konrad Adenauer, in the Luzerner Tagblatt, 2 August 1980.
