= Karel Meulemans =

Belgian pigeon fancier

Karel Meulemans (b. Retie, Belgium, 3 February 1934) is a Belgian pigeon fancier.

== Biography ==
=== Early life ===
In 1946 moved Karel's parents, who were farmers, a farm on 3.5 hectares of land in Arendonk, (Belgium), where Karel Meulemans, to this day lives.

His first steps in the sport at age 12, he under the impetus his uncle Jan Bols. He was initially successful, with the exception of some nice results were obtained with pigeons by Adriaan Wouters. In 1961, Karel finally visited with his father, the lofts of Jos van den Bosch in Berlaar (Belgium) where 5 pigeons were purchased. These birds would provide the basis for the breed Meulemans, together with a hen of Adriaan Wouters in 1969 was introduced in the formation of the duo-Wouters Meulemans.

=== Wouters-Meulemans ===
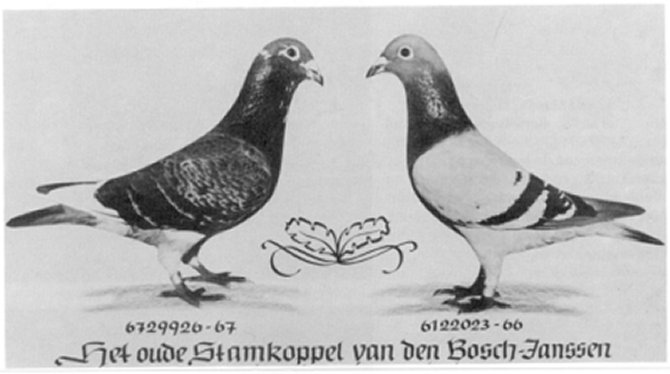
Golden Couple

The main couple "Oude van den Bosch x Blue Janssen" was a host of top pigeons bred like Merckx, Junior, Kadet, Piet, Witneus, Schoon Donker, Liebling, Prins, Madelon and Benjamin. These pigeons were not only on the basis of the success of the Meulemans pigeons themselves, but also performed excellently in the lofts of many other seekers like Gommaire Verbruggen, Raymund Hermes, Willy Van Berendonck, William Geerts, Frans Moris, Stan Van Beemen, Horst Hackemer, Serge Van Elsacker, Hans & Ria Klessens De Lepper, Saville Penkin, Albert Babington, George Litherland Wain Lea Lofts, Alan Brassington, Herman Beverdam, Spencer Jackson, John Kirk, August & Frank Daelemans etc. Numerous victories and have won national and international Olympiad pigeons to breed Meulemans achieved. The peak years reached the Wouters-Meulemans team in 1973 and 1974 when prizes were 32 1st and won 180 prizes in the top 10. In 1975, however, came with the death of Adriaan Wouters an end to the cooperation. The Wouters-Meulemans pigeons collection semi-total sold.

=== Meulemans-Mariën ===
In 1976 however a new team formed between Karel and Adrian Wouter's son, Frans Mariën. Again took Karels, who had his hands full on his farm for the breeding of pigeons, while Frans was the playing member of the team. Between 1976 and 1980 earned the Marien-Meulemans successes as a team with that of the former Wouters-Meulemans team at least equaled. The dominance of Frans Marien and Karel Meulemans was such that in the Zuiderkempen in 1978 were excluded in the middle-distance races. Besides the descendants of the so-called Golden Couple "Oude Van den Bosch x Blue Janssen" also brought the descendants of a new super breeding pair "Blue Saelen x Oude Bourgeske" excellent results. Frans Marien's method of play hard, sometimes up to 2/3 of the race pigeons lost during the season, made it to growing resentment among "breeder" Karel Meulemans. He was, however, do not have the time to end the cooperation. In April 1980 Frans Marien committed suicide for reasons still unclear. By a clause in the cooperation contract, all the racing and breeding pigeons want to be sold with 20 pigeons in a way, where Karles had to pay as much for the 20 pigeons he kept than their encores in the auction had raised. For his precious collection of breeding pigeons in part to save Karel Meulemans was thus a financial drain to undergo, which gave him for an aversion to playing in team with other fans.

=== Meulemans-Damen ===
From 1981 Karel was therefore had to collaborate with his daughter and son in law. Despite the fact that the new Meulemans-Dame duo could offer a nice loft breeders took until 1984 before a first prize Étampes of the comeback Meulemans pigeons announced. That same year they became Champion Middle Distance Yearlings in Arendonk. The success was short-lived. In 1985, 21 racing pigeons stolen from the loft, including 2 of the 4 pigeons that had helped win the championship. The heaviest blow cashed the loft Meulemans But the following year, when thieves, despite an alarm system, to get started with 29 top pigeons, including the legendary "Kadet". Between 1986 and 1989, Karel Meulemans not be anything other than breeding and again trying to build loft. He then right away took the opportunity to switch on long distance. These distances were actually always formed Karel's passion, but his former teammates Adriaan Wouters Frans Marien and never had to know something of the game at long distances.

=== The 90's ===
The Meulemans pigeons from the old line were now supplemented with pigeons from Karel Schellekens, Marien Pieterse, Georges Bolle and Van Gils. This "new" places Karel Meulemans pigeons early 90s back on the map with victories including Bourges, Montargis, Melun, Argenton and Limoges. A pigeon exchanges Leo Broeckx also showed a bull's eye. The Broeckx pigeons Karel had was the father of his pigeon Olympiad in Bazel in 1997. Broeckx 'pigeon was in turn to Karels's father loft "Jonge Kadet", 1st Limoges, Brive 1st and 2nd Chateauroux. Pigeons "Kadetje 2" (1st Bourges, 1st Argenton and 7th National Argenton) and "Den Brave" (first Narbonne, 1st Montauban and 1st Chateauroux) were the new superstars of the loft Meulemans. In 1995 put "Donkere Dax" the icing on the cake with a National win in Dax. Beautiful results from Brive and Cahors provided "Donkere Dax" the 8th National Ace Long Distance title. In 1996 a new golden trio born that Karel would be reminiscent of the happy years with Merckx, Junior and Kadet. "Pantani", "590" and "591" triumphed as the top long distance at Brive and Marseille. Their spectacular results gave Karel the highlight of his career. In 1999 he won the National Long Distance Championship. Karel Meulemans, the "Master Breeder" had finally proved that he is thus a "master player".

=== From 1999 ===
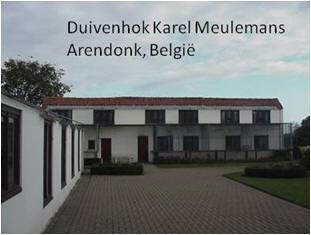
Pigeonlofts January 2011

Repeating such a result, even for a great champion, is not easy. However since 1999, express the Meulemans pigeons regularly made their mark on the distance events. New victories in Marseille, Cahors, Montauban, Bordeaux, Béziers, etc. confirmed the continuing value of the Meulemans pigeons for the sport. Meanwhile, the race to evolve, driven by Karel. New hybrids, including the Florizoone pigeons, the future without securing the value of the "Oude van den Bosch x Blue Janssen" strain from losing sight.

== Sources ==
- Frank Daelemans, Karel Meulemans, het complete verhaal van een duivensport legende ISBN 90-806079-1-6
