= Van Gils =

Van Gils or Van Gilse is a Dutch toponymic surname meaning "from Gilze". People with this name include:

Van Gils

- Wanny van Gils (1959–2018), Dutch football forward and coach
- Charlotte van Gils (born 1986), Dutch snowboarder
- Stéphanie Van Gils (born 1991), Belgian football forward
- Maxim Van Gils (born 1999), Belgian road cyclist

Van Gilse

- Jan van Gilse (1881–1944), Dutch composer and conductor
- Nicolaï van Gilse van der Pals (1891–1969), Russian conductor and musicologist
- Leopold van Gilse van der Pals (1884–1966), Russian composer

== Others ==
- Van Gils (clothing), a brand of WE
