= Christian Ernst Stahl =

German botanist (1848–1919)

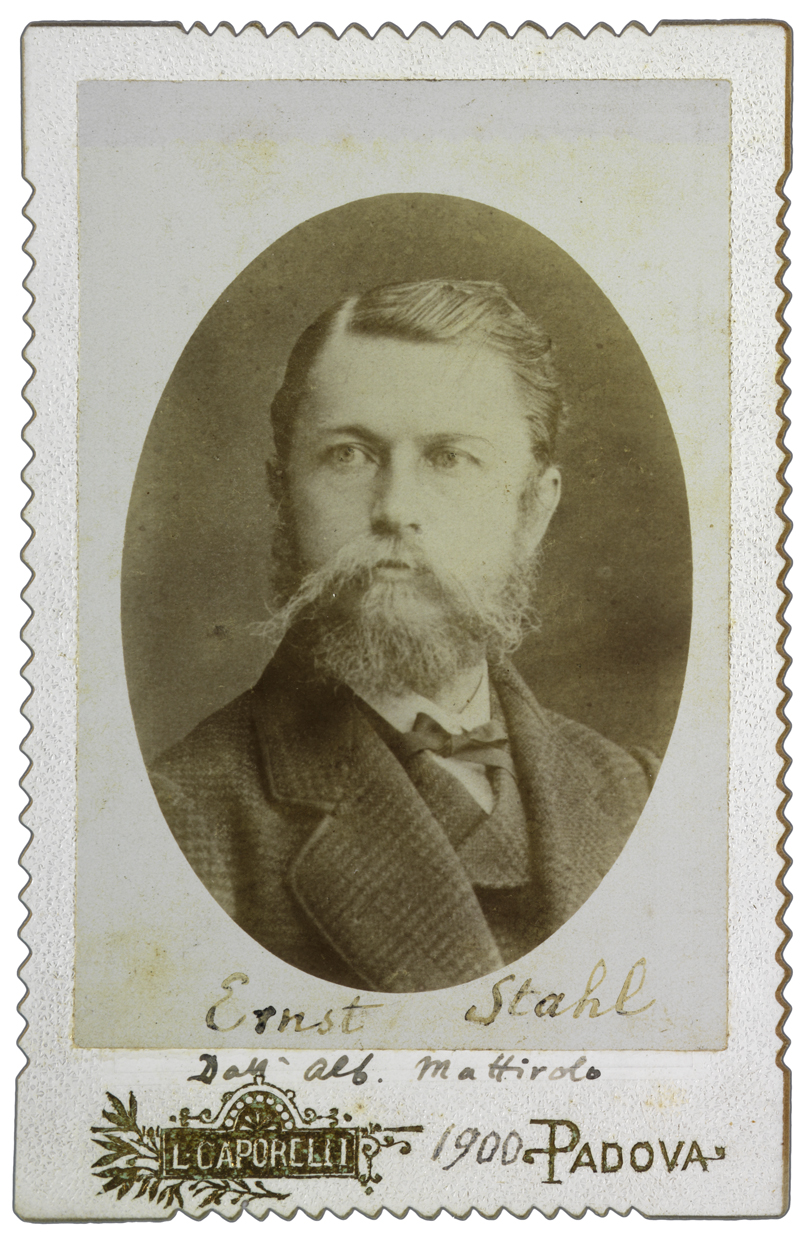
- Carte de Visite, 1900
- Born: 21 June 1848; Schiltigheim, Alsace
- Died: 3 December 1919 (aged 71); Jena, Germany
- Citizenship: German
- Known for: pioneer in ecophysiology
- Scientific career
- Fields: botany, chemical ecology

Christian Ernst Stahl (21 June 1848 – 3 December 1919) was a Franco-German botanist from Schiltigheim, Alsace. He worked on the ecophysiology of plants and has been considered a pioneer of chemical ecology in his work examining the defences of plants against herbivores, although he considered snails and slugs to be the dominant herbivores that drove plant evolution rather than insects.

== Biography ==
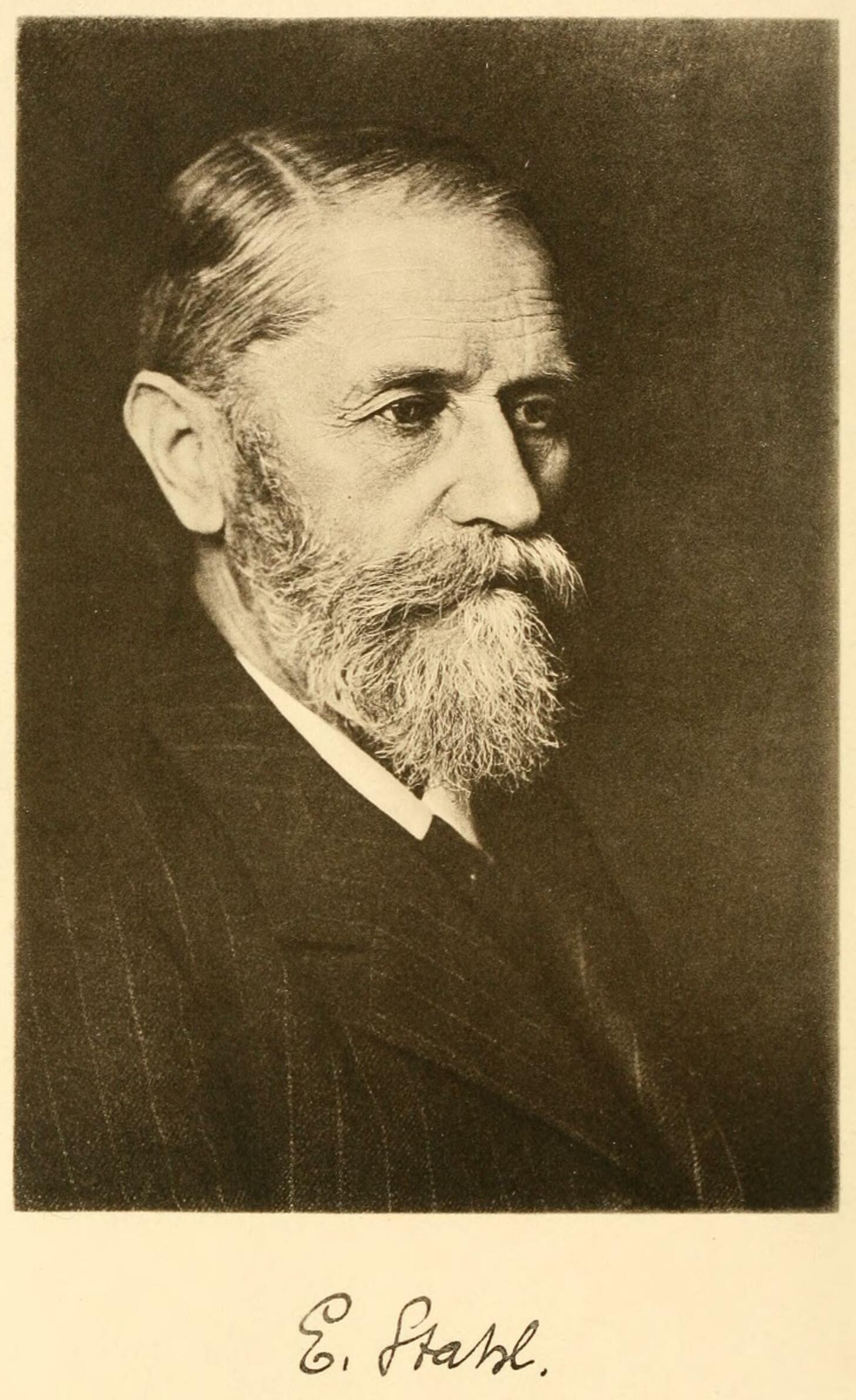

Stahl was born in Schiltigheim to timber merchant Christian Adolf and Magdalene née Rhein. He went to the local schools and then grammar school at Strasbourg. He studied botany at the University of Strasbourg with Pierre-Marie-Alexis Millardet (1838-1902). The Franco-Prussian War of 1870-71 made him move to the University of Halle where he studied under Anton de Bary (1831-1888). He earned his doctorate in 1874 with a thesis on lenticels. He later became an assistant to Julius von Sachs (1832-1897) at the University of Würzburg. He was appointed an associate professor at the University of Strasbourg in 1880, and after just one year, he attained the chair of botany at the University of Jena in 1881, succeeding Eduard Strasburger. Here, he also served as director of the botanical garden.

== Botanical research ==
Stahl is remembered for his pioneer experiments in the field of ecophysiology, as well as research involving the developmental history of lichens. He was able to induce the synthesis of the lichen Endocarpon pusillum from spores and algal material, including formation of apothecia, and thus he made a strong experimental case for the hypothesis by Simon Schwendener (1829-1919) that lichens are twin fungal-algal organisms. Stahl also examined chemotaxis and movement of slime moulds, phototaxis in desmids, geotropism in plants, and the role of mycorrhiza among plant roots.

Stahl travelled to Algeria in 1887 and in 1889-90 he visited Ceylon and Java with Andreas Franz Wilhelm Schimper (1856–1901) and George Karsten (1863–1937). In 1894 he visited Mexico with Karsten.

Other contributions by Stahl included studies concerning the influence of light on plants — he described the anatomy of sun and shade leaves; the effects of moisture and dryness on the formation of leaves, and the role of stomata in xerophytes and mesophytes. He conducted important research on the symbiotic relationship between mycorrhizal fungi and tree roots, and also worked on plant defense against snail and slug herbivory and a plethora of other botanical and ecological questions. He has been considered as a pioneer of chemical ecology with his speculation on the role of secondary metabolites.

Stahl's students included Hans Adolf Eduard Driesch (1867-1941), Hans Kniep (1881-1930), Julius Schaxel (1887–1943), Otto Stocker (1888–1966) and Heinrich Walter (1889–1989).

== Selected scientific works ==
- Entwickelung und Anatomie der Lenticellen. (Evolution and anatomy of lenticel); Leipzig 1873.
- Beiträge zur Entwickelungsgeschichte der Flechten. (Contributions to the evolutionary history of lichens); Leipzig 1877.
- Über den Einfluß von Richtung und Stärke der Beleuchtung auf einige Bewegungserscheinungen im Pflanzenreich. - (On the influence of direction and intensity of illumination involving movement phenomena in the plant kingdom); Leipzig 1880.
- Über sogenannte Kompaßpflanzen. (treatise on compass plants); Jena 1883.
- Über den Einfluß des sonnigen oder schattigen Standortes auf die Ausbildung der Laubblätter. (Concerning sun and shade on the formation of leaves on deciduous trees); Jena 1883.
- Einfluß des Lichtes auf den Geotropismus einiger Pflanzenorgane. (Influence of light in regards to geotropism of plants); Berlin 1884.
- Zur Biologie der Myxomyceten (The biology of slime mold). Leipzig 1884.
- Pflanzen und Schnecken. Eine biologische Studie über die Schutzmittel der Pflanzen gegen Schneckenfraß. (Plants and snails, a biological study regarding protection of plants against slugs); Jena 1888.
