= Zaichik =

Zaichik is an East Slavic surname meaning "little hare". It is a diminutive of Zayats ("hare").

Alternative spellings include Zaitchik, Zaychik, and Saitschick (German-style transliteration). Notable people with the surname include:

- Alexander Zaitchik (born 1974), American journalist
- Gennadi Zaichik (born 1957), American chess player
- Robert Saitschick (1868–1965), Swiss philosopher
