= Hôtel de Ville, Schiltigheim =

Town hall in Schiltigheim, France

Hôtel de Ville
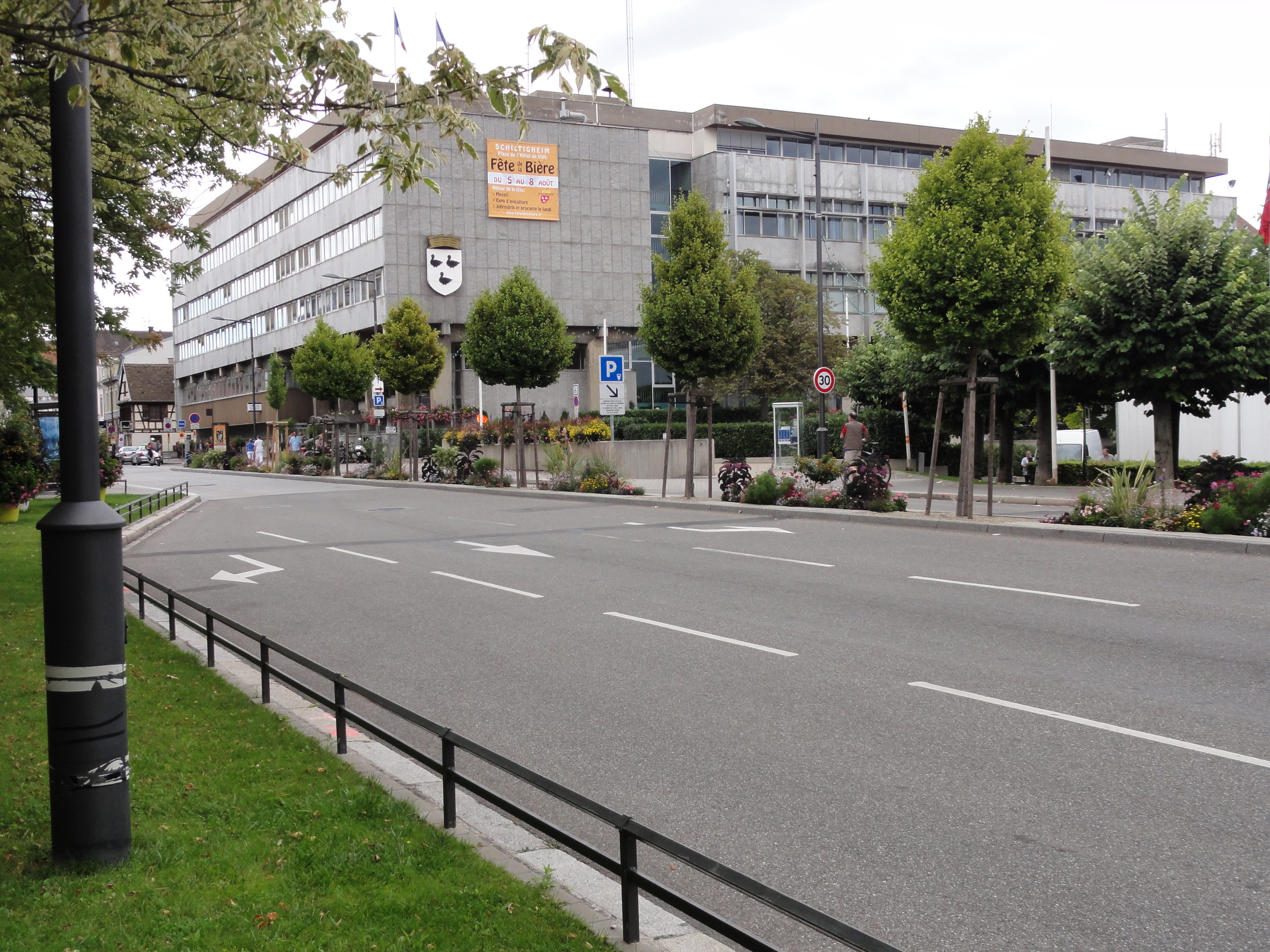
- The main frontage of the Hôtel de Ville in August 2011
- Interactive map of the Hôtel de Ville area

General information
- Type: City hall
- Architectural style: Modern style
- Location: Schiltigheim, France
- Coordinates: 48.6053°N 7.7486°E
- Completed: 1969

Design and construction
- Architects: Henri Jean Calsat and Louis Schneider

The Hôtel de Ville (French pronunciation: [otɛl də vil], City Hall) is a municipal building in Schiltigheim, Bas-Rhin, in northeastern France, standing on Route de Bischwiller. It has been included on the Inventaire général des monuments by the French Ministry of Culture since 2007.

== History ==
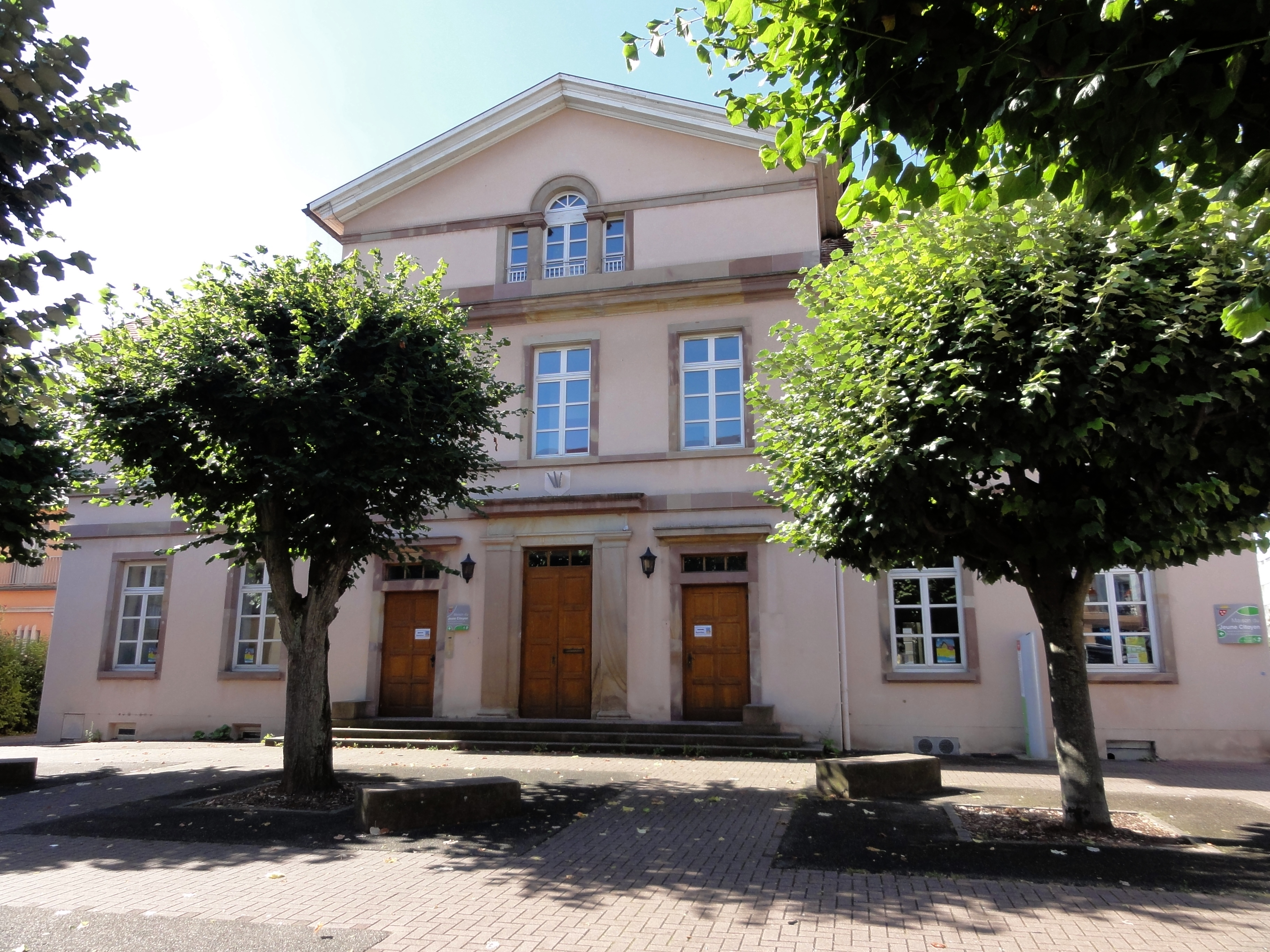
The first town hall

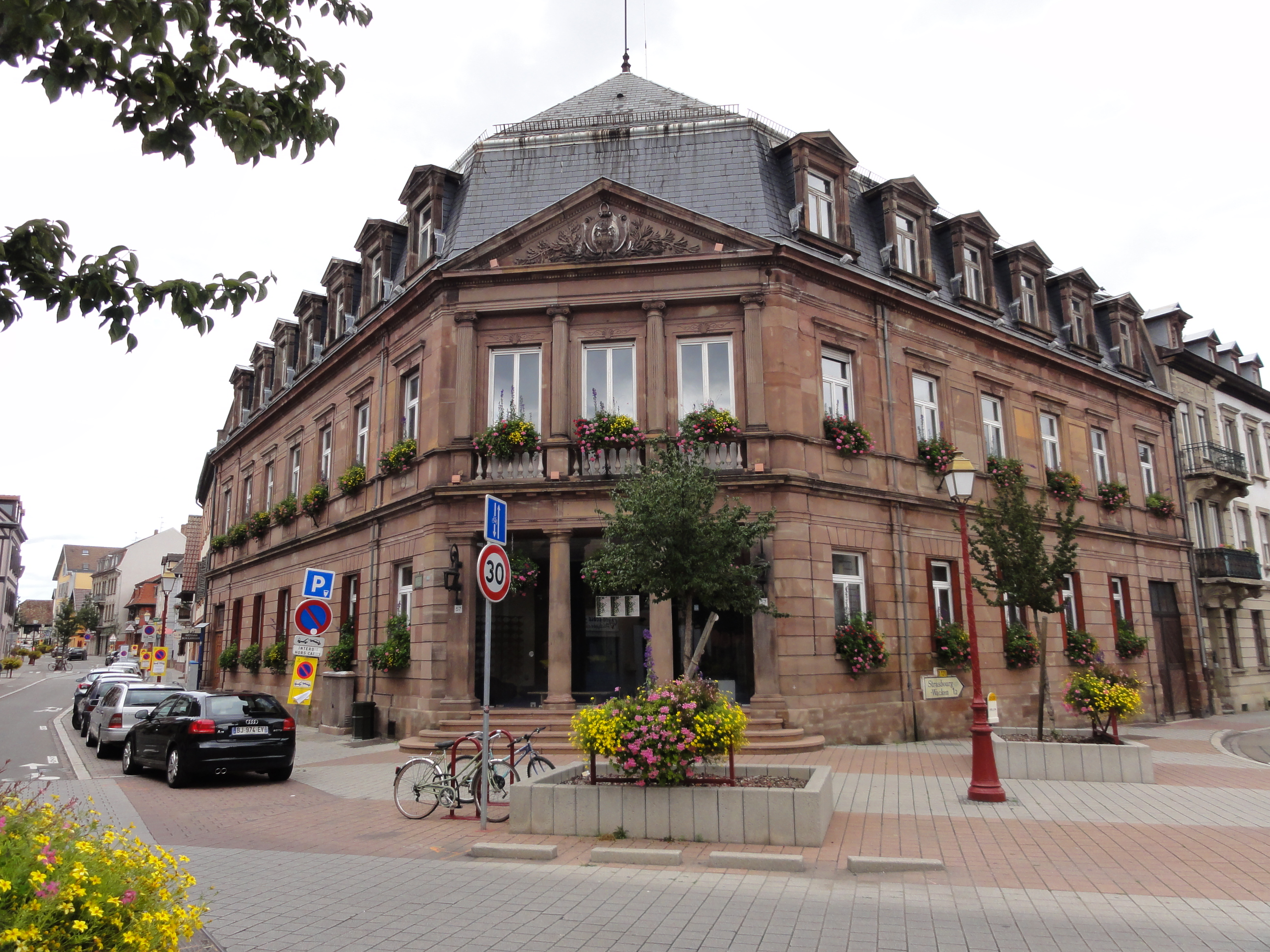
The second town hall

Following the French Revolution, the town council initially met at the house of the mayor at the time. This arrangement continued until the mid-1820s when the council led by the mayor, Philippe-Eugène Rodolphe, decided to commission a combined school and town hall. The site chosen was on the south side of Rue de Pompiers. The building was designed in the neoclassical style, built in brick with a cement render finish and was completed in 1828. The design involved a symmetrical main frontage of seven bays facing onto Rue de Pompiers. The central section of three bays, which was slightly projected forward, featured three doorways on the ground floor, three casement windows on the first floor and a Venetian window in the gable above. The outer bays were also fenestrated with casement windows. The building continued to accommodate council officials until 1996, when it became the Maison du Jeune Citoyen (house for young citizens).

In the mid-1870s, the council then led by the mayor, Charles Rhein, decided to commission a dedicated town hall. The site they selected, on the corner of Rue Principale and Rue du Barrage, had been occupied by the municipal well. The foundation stone for the second town hall was laid on 7 October 1876. The building was designed by Gustave Adolphe Beyer in the neoclassical style, built in red stone and was officially opened on 1 May 1880. The design involved a main frontage of three bays facing onto the corner of the two streets, with a façade of seven bays along Rue Principal and a façade of six bays along Rue du Barrage. The main frontage featured a short flight of steps leading up to three doorways flanked by Doric order columns supporting an entablature. On the first floor, there were three tall casement windows with balustrades flanked by Ionic order columns supporting an entablature and a pediment with a coat of arms in the tympanum. An extra floor at attic level was designed by Henri Risch and Frédéric Herveh and added to the building in 1930. A fine stained glass window depicting the mayor, Adolphe Sorgues, examining architectural plans was installed in the stairwell in the mid-20th century. After the building was no longer required for municipal purposes, it became the École Municipale de Musique (municipal school of music).

Following the liberation of the town by troops of the French 2nd Armoured Division, commanded by General Philippe Leclerc de Hauteclocque, on 23 November 1944, the flag of the Association des sous-officiers de réserves de Schiltigheim (Association of Non-Commissioned Officers of the Reserves of Schiltigheim) was the first to fly over the building.

In July 2016, the building was sold to a property developer for conversion into flats and there were subsequent allegations from opposition councillors that the building had been sold for less than its market value. In May 2018, a court ruled in favour of allegations but, in August 2020, the ruling was reversed on appeal.

In the mid-1960s, following significant population growth, the council led by the mayor, Georges Ritter, decided to commission a modern town hall. The site they selected, on the east side of Route de Bischwiller, was occupied by a malthouse and a restaurant. Construction of the new building started in 1964. It was designed by Henri Jean Calsat and Louis Schneider in the modern style, built in concrete and glass and was officially opened on 15 March 1969. The building was laid out as two five-storey blocks, positioned perpendicular to each other. The main frontage on Route de Bischwiller featured, at the right-hand end, a recessed area with a series of glass doors separated by five reinforced concrete piers supporting the upper floors. The rest of the frontage was facing with alternating rows of glass and slabs of grey granite stone. Internally, the principal rooms were the Salle du Conseil (council chamber) on the first floor, and the Salle des Mariages (wedding room), which was decorated with a fine tapestry by Tristan Ruhlmann, on the second floor.
