= Friedrich Castelle =

German journalist (1879–1954)

Friedrich Castelle (also known as Hans Dietmar, Fritz von Schonebeck or Hans Uhlenbrock; 30 April 1879 – 15 January 1954), was a Völkischer Nationalismus (Völkischer Nationalism, a German ethnic and nationalist movement) journalist and writer and party member of the NS regime.

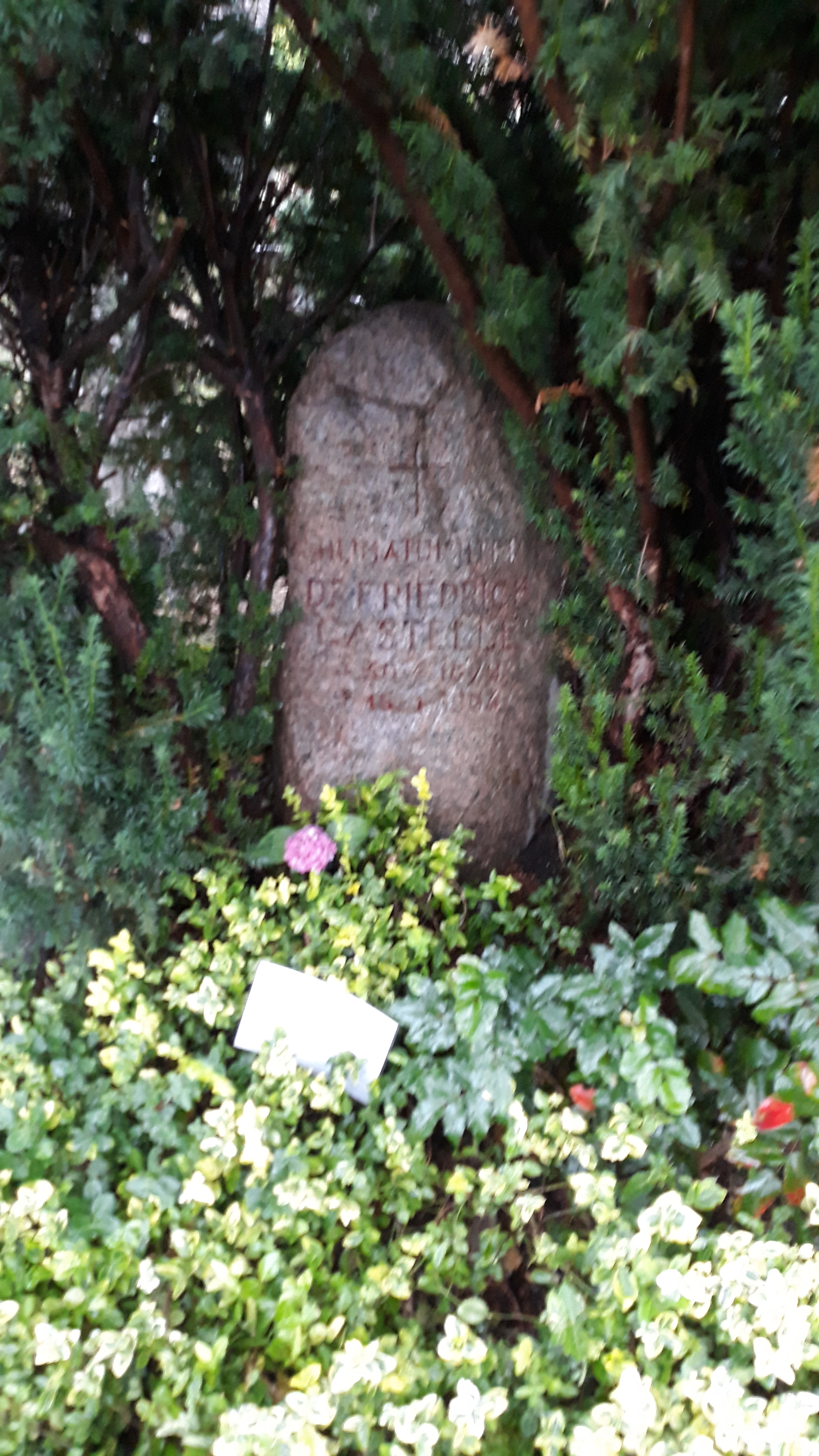
The grave of Friedrich Castelle at the Mauritz cemetery in Münster.

== Life ==
Born in Appelhülsen, Castelle was the son of a merchant who came from a French immigrant family. Castelle attended the Gymnasium in Münster and then studied philosophy at the Westfälische Wilhelms-Universität. From 1900 to 1904, he worked as a journalist in Aschaffenburg, Aachen, and other places. From 1904 to 1911, he was a member of the editorial office of the Münsterischer Anzeiger. In 1906, he was awarded a doctorate in philosophy at the University of Münster with a dissertation on Joseph von Eichendorff.

In addition to his journalistic work, he wrote novels, short stories, biographies, poems and radio plays, and edited Westphalia and Low German writers.

From 1912 to 1915, Castelle directed the magazine Deutschland. During World War I, Castelle was head of the press and news department of the Deputy Generalkommando of the VII Armeekorps. From 1916, he was assigned to the managing director of the Völkisch oriented Westfälischer Heimatbund, whose journal Heimatblätter der Roten Erde he published together with Karl Wagenfeld from 1919 as editor. After 1918, Castelle was one of the co-initiators of the "Niederdeutsche Heimatbühne" in Münster, and until 1921 he held the position of lecturer at the University of Münster. In addition, as before 1914, he undertook extensive lecture tours through Germany. From 1921, Castelle was a lecturer at the Heinrich-Heine-Universität Düsseldorf and head of the radio broadcasting station in Düsseldorf. From 1922, he directed the monthly magazine founded by Paul Keller and published Die Bergstadt in Breslau.

Even before 1933, Castelle provided the National Socialists with journalistic support. From 1930, he was appointed as editor of the magazine Der Türmer, Monatsschrift für Gemüt und Geist the journalistic guideline of the paper, the successor of Die Bergstadt. In a book show in Der Türmer from 1932, he mainly advertised for national socialist authors. He regarded the increase of national socialist literature as a "process of recovery". "He praised Horst Ewers' biography of Horst Wessel, which played a major role in glorifying the SA-Mann: 'Ewers picked out this suggestion and now tells the fate of our days and of German youth in the form of Horst Wessel, who died a martyr's death for the young German freedom movement."

After the Machtergreifung by the Nazis and its allies, Castelle, who had joined the NSDAP in 1933, held key positions in the cultural bureaucracy of the new regime. He "glorified not only Hitler but also the party ideologist Alfred Rosenberg", who - unlike Goebbels - took a stance in questions of art and art politics that was closely aligned with "Blut und Boden" and "healthy popular sentiment", and at the same time defended himself against the Weimar "art of decay", as it was asserted in 1937 with the exhibition "Degenerate Art". After Castelle had already been chairman of the NS cultural community for the Steinfurt district, he was appointed member of the advisory board of the Gaus Westfalen-Nord and leading employee of the Reich Chamber of Literature. In 1937, he became a clerk, e.g. in a department of the Westdeutscher Rundfunk Köln, where he was later promoted to deputy director. During the war, he was head of a press and news department and of Rundfunksenders in occupied Luxembourg. He was a member of the Reichsschrifttumskammer and, at times, of the Reichsrundfundkammer.

In Der Türmer he was "more and more offensive" for National Socialism. In the future "everything" in the magazine would be "subordinated to the service of the people and the fatherland". The fight for intellectual freedom in the spirit of the Führer has always been our first and the last goal for 35 years, it will remain our last and first goal in the future. The aim is "to collect the valuable and essential achievements of the new age and make them usable for the overall culture of the people in the course of this tremendous upsurge in the glorious renewal of the people". He saw the "extermination" of "sub-humanity, which has its most dangerous emanations in communism and Bolshevism" as a prerequisite for this, but he also used Der Türmer for anti-Semitic propaganda.

In 1935, Castelle tried to integrate the Annette von Droste-Hülshoff Society into a Nazi organisation. He was an early supporter of Hermann Löns, with whom he was personally acquainted. When a National Socialist Löns cult was established in Germany, he "earned" "inglorious merits" as a member of the Löns Memorial Foundation. "In a political-symbolic farce that is hard to beat in terms of embarrassment and mishaps". In 1935, he directed the transfer of the alleged remains of Hermann Löns to the Lüneburger Heide.

In 1938, the writer, considered a devout Catholic, had left the church.

After the end of the period of National Socialism, Castelle was arrested by the British military government and interned due to his Nazi exposure. In the denazification proceedings, he was judged to be "a strong Nazi" (1946). "Because of his strong positive work for the NSDAP" the "rehabilitation was rejected" (1946). Castelle presented himself as a victim of the circumstances which had been considered "politically unreliable". For the years 1933 to 1937, nobody could prove that he had been "active in a political sense". In the following phases of denazification, the assessments improved: "Activity as a poet and free artist is not only unhesitating but urgently desired" (1947). Under these conditions, he succeeded in working for broadcasting again, now mainly as the author of Münsterländer Platt plattdeutsche radio plays. With lectures and recitations, he continued to perform before a shrunken circle of listeners. He remained closely connected to his home milieu. He was a member of the board of the Heimat- und Verkehrsverein of his hometown. In an obituary, the "Steinfurt messenger" described him as a "personality of unique character". "He and we" had formed "a single unit", just as there had been a "unity of the poet with his audience".

Castelle died in Welbergen (Kreis Steinfurt) at the age of 74.

== Honour, criticism and withdrawal ==
- 1903: Literature prize of the Literarische Gesellschaft Köln
- 1925: Literature prize of the Deutschlandbundes
- until 1990: Castelle bust in the old town hall of Steinfurt, which was removed during reconstruction work
- 1954: Funeral with participation of "high-ranking representatives of public life"
- 1958: Naming of a street in Münster as "Castelleweg"
- 1987/1988: Restoration of his grave in the Mauritz cemetery

In 2010 at the latest, a public discussion about "Castelleweg" began in Münster, focusing on the National Socialist burden on the eponym. In 2010, the discovery of the buried knowledge of Castelle's Nazi activities was followed in Steinfurt by a council discussion on the renaming of the "Castelleweg", which was recommended by the cultural committee. The proposal was not capable of winning a majority until the end of 2011. Then the Council decided to affix the future sign "Thomas-Mann-Weg" under the street sign "Friedr.-Castelle-Weg", which would then disappear, during a transitional period from the beginning of 2012 to mid-2013.

In June 2011, the Commission "Street Names" of the City of Münster unanimously recommended the renaming of the street to the City Council "because of the parallel to Karl Wagenfeld". The Council then took a corresponding decision.

In November 2012, Castelle-Straße was also renamed Rheine-Mesum after Thomas Mann.

In Ochtrup (Kr. Steinfurt) a renaming decision to "Castellestraße" was taken by the Council at the end of 2012. A strong minority spoke against it. The CDU parliamentary group had submitted the - rejected - proposal to keep the name, but to attach an additional sign with a QR code. This would give "everyone the opportunity to find out about the National Socialist connections of Friedrich Castelle and Karl Wagenfeld [the second case of renaming]"

In Dortmund, in August 2014, the City Archives advocated a renaming of Castellestraße. The renaming took place in February 2016.

== Publications ==
- Vom Leben und Lieben. Cologne 1903
- Ungedruckte Dichtungen Eichendorffs. Münster i.W. 1906
- Gustav Falke. Leipzig 1909
- Charlotte Niese. Leipzig 1914
- Der Heliand. Cassel 1915
- Späte Lerchen in der Luft. Cologne 1917
- Löns-Gedenkbuch. Hannover 1917
- Das Haus in der Dreizehnmännergasse. Hanover 1919
- Hermann Löns. Hanover 1920
- Annette von Droste-Hülshoff: Dichtungen der Droste. M.Gladbach 1920
- In und um Recklinghausen. Recklinghausen 1920 with Karl Boblenz)
- Levin Schücking: Paul Bronckhorst oder Die neuen Herren. Münster in Westf. 1920
- Levin Schücking: Die Marketenderin von Köln. Münster i. W. 1921
- Ferdinand Zumbroock: Ausgewählte plattdeutsche Gedichte. Münster 1921
- Charon. Hanover 1921
- Wanderer im Weltall. Warendorf 1921
- Heilige Erde. Breslau 1922
- Die schöne Bibernell. Breslau 1923
- Hermann Löns: Sämtliche Werke. 8 volumes, Leipzig 1923
- Die Wächter der Stadt Münster i. W. Münster i.W. 1924
- Hermann Löns und seine Heide. Berlin 1924
- Das Heuscheuer-Gebirge. Breslau 1925
- Im Zauber des Lönslandes. Berlin 1925
- Der Vogel Holdermund. Hildesheim 1925
- Hermann Löns: Junglaub. Bad Pyrmont 1925
- Castelle - Droste-Hülshoff - Löns. Recklinghausen 1929
- "Fleesk up'n Disk!". Münster i.W. 1930
- Volk, das ich liebe.... Sponholtz, Hanover 1934. Was placed on the List of literature to be discarded in the Soviet occupation zone.
- Die schöne Grafschaft Glatz. Glatz 1936
- Annette von Droste-Hülshoff: Denn von den Sternen grüß' ich euch. Münster 1938
- Karl Wagenfeld. Münster 1939
- Münster, Westfalens schöne Hauptstadt. Münster (Westf.) 1939
- Max von Spießen : Geschichten aus dem "Schneckenhaus". Dülmen i. Westf. 1940
- Das Ahnenerbe in Hermann Löns. Münster 1941
- Jeremias Gotteswürmchen. Essen 1941
- Eine Jahrtausend-Chronik zur 600-Jahrfeier der Stadt Burgsteinfurt. Burgsteinfurt 1947
- Heidideldum. Horstmar [among others] 1949
- Min Mönsterland. Münster/Westf. 1949
- De junge Dokter orre He treckt up't Land. 1950
- Karl Wagenfeld: Gesammelte Werke. 2 volumes, Münster 1954 and 1956

== Translations ==
- Andreas Haukland: Helge der Wiking. Hannover 1927 (translated with Luise Wolf)
- Voltaire: Merope. Münster i. W. 1912
