= Leopold van der Pals =

Danish and Dutch Composer

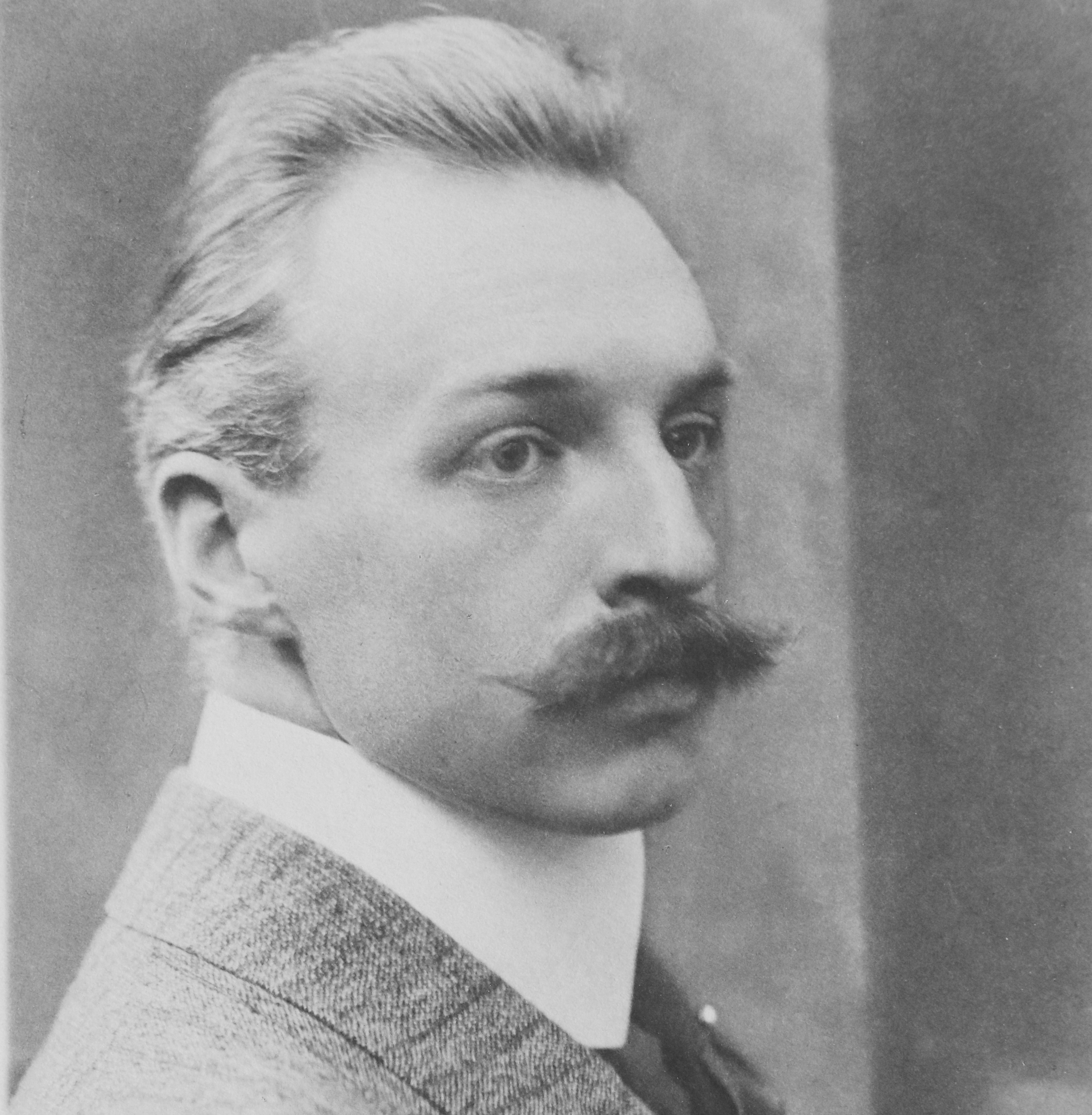
Leopold van der Pals around 1920

Leopold van der Pals (St. Petersburg 4 July 1884 – Dornach 7 February 1966) was a Danish/Dutch modernist composer who developed a personal and lyrical style in composing by involving elements of late romanticism, expressionism and impressionism.

From an early age, Van der Pals expressed himself as a composer, writing at least 50 works before the age of 18. He studied with Professor Julius Johannsen (Van der Pals' grand father), Alexander Denéréas (Lausanne) and Reinhold Gliere (Berlin). Van der Pals also studied piano under Alexander Siloti and cello under Tom Canivez.

Leopold van der Pals debut as a composer took place in 1909 with Berlin Philharmonic Orchestra (Symphony nr. 1 in F sharp minor, Op. 4) and an extensive tour of performances throughout Europe and America followed until WWII. The main part of his 252 works consists of music for singers (8 operas, 9 cantatas and 650 lieder), but it also includes orchestral works and chamber music. He was in close contact with authors, musicians, artists and poets his whole life. Among them were Rudolf Steiner, Andrei Belyj, Rainer Maria Rilke, Friedrich Lienhard, Sergei Rachmaninoff, Serge Koussevitzky and Alexander Scriabin.

== Biography ==
=== St. Petersburg 1884-1903 ===
Leopold van der Pals was born into an artistic and aristocratic home in St. Petersburg, Russian Empire with a Dutch father and Danish mother. His father, Hendrik van Gilse van der Pals was the Dutch general counsel in Russia and director of the “Treugolnik” rubber factory. At the age of 12, Leopold van der Pals started his musical training under his grandfather, Julius Johannsen, a Professor of counterpoint and director of the Saint Petersburg Conservatory (Johannsen was himself a student of Felix Mendelssohn and Niels W. Gade). The van der Pals home was open to artists and musicians, and here, Leopold van der Pals heard concerts with Modest Tchaikovsky, Anton Arensky, Alexander Glazunov, Alexander Siloti, Pablo Casals, and many others.

=== Lausanne 1903-1907 ===
At the age of 19 van der Pals left Russia to continue his studies in Lausanne, Switzerland, with the famous Swiss composer and music theory professor Alexander Denéréas, and the cellist Thomas Canivez. Here he formed a long lasting friendship with the conductor Ernest Ansermet. Van der Pals' education was closely supervised by Denéréas, and even when van der Pals was forced to stay in a sanatorium in Davos to recover from signs of tuberculosis, Denéréas visited him and they continued their studies.

In 1907, after four years of basic musical education in Lausanne, Van der Pals moved to Berlin and, on the recommendation of Sergei Rachmaninoff, he now received guidance and lessons by the Russian composer Reinhold Glière. Here, van der Pals formed a friendship with many musical personalities: Arthur Nikisch, Felix Weingartner, Siegmund von Hausegger, Gustav Havemann, Serge Koussevitsky and Alexander Scriabin among others. Here he also met the philosopher Rudolf Steiner, who made a great impression on him and introduced the idea of metamorphosis, derived from Johann Wolfgang von Goethe. At the time, Berlin was a melting pot of musical development in the wake of the romantic era. Van der Pals experimented with new harmonic ideas and alternative cadenzas. He shaped his personal expression, a hybrid of different styles such as romanticism, impressionism, free tonality and inspiration from Russian and Nordic folklore. It was here that he started to give his works opus numbers; all previous compositions were abandoned.

=== Berlin 1907-1915 ===
During the Berlin years, 1907–1915, van der Pals was very productive and composed his first 30 works, concentrating on large orchestral pieces and lieder. His First Symphony, Op. 4 was premiered in 1909 by the Berlin Philharmonic Orchestra conducted by Heinrich Schulz. The Symphony was very well received in the press and this resulted in an extensive series of performances of his pieces throughout Europe and America.

=== Arlesheim 1915-1922 ===
In 1915, due to World War I, Van der Pals moved to Arlesheim in Switzerland with his wife Marussja and their young daughter Lea. Here he started his large series of compositions of chamber music for various ensembles. A string quartet, a piano trio, a duo for cello and violin and sonatas for piano, cello and violin.

=== Years of traveling 1922-1934 ===
In 1922 van der Pals completed his Second Symphony, Op. 51. However, the orchestration of this piece was interrupted when Leopold's wife Marussja fell ill; in order to treat her condition, the family was forced to leave Arlesheim. For a period of 11 years the family constantly traveled between sanatoriums in order to find a place suitable for Marussja's condition. During these years the family stayed in approximately 80 locations in Europe without a fixed home. This time was troublesome for Van der Pals. His wife's treatment was expensive and Leopold experienced great difficulty to follow and continue his career. He had no chance to travel and hear performances of his compositions. In spite of his difficulties he continued his work and in this period he composed the Third Symphony, "Rhapsody", Op. 73, the "Hodler Suite", Op. 74, based on four paintings by Ferdinand Hodler, and two operas, Der Berg des Heiligen Michael, Op. 71, and Eisenhand, Op. 85.

=== Dornach 1934-1966 ===
Marussja died in 1934. Her death affected Leopold deeply. He withdrew himself to Ascona, Switzerland, and mourned the loss of his wife. Here Van der Pals wrote 80 poems to her love and memory; 45 of them were put to music. The work became his Op. 96, In Memoriam with the subtitle ”Dem Geiste meiner Frau". He then finally settled down in Dornach in Switzerland, where he lived during the remaining 31 years of his life.

In the early 1930s, Van der Pals experienced the loss of many people close to him: his wife, his father, and several of his close friends. During this period, he composed his Requiem and the Third violin sonata, Op. 101, with the middle movement ”Marcia funebre”. He also now orchestrated the Second Symphony, Op. 51. The premiere of the symphony took place in Vienna in 1937, with his brother Nicolaï van Gilse van der Pals conducting. At the same concert, his Third symphony and Violin Concerto were also played.

Even though the interest in van der Pals’ music was extensive, the possibilities of performances were soon to be diminished. The climate for modern composers and artists suffered from the harsh political atmosphere and escalating international conflicts. With the start of World War II all possibilities were gone and many artists migrated to America where the conditions were better. Leopold decided to stay in Switzerland even though this meant to distance himself from the modern music environment. He never stopped creating, no matter which obstacles came his way. Apart from the 252 completed opuses, he also wrote poems, articles, reviews and librettos for all of his eight operas. At the time of Leopold's death on 1 February 1966 aged 83, his last piece, an opera called Isis was left on the piano unfinished.

== Family ==
Van der Pals married Maria (Marussja) von Beshe in St. Petersburg in 1907. They had one daughter, Lea van Gilse van der Pals, who became a renowned dancer and teacher, both in Dornach, Switzerland and internationally. One of Leopold's younger brothers, Nicolaï van Gilse van der Pals, was a conductor in Helsinki and elsewhere in Europe.

== List of Works ==
Leopold van der Pals wrote 252 opus, 43 Jugendwerke and a number of unfinished works. His oeuvre includes songs, chamber music, symphonies and eight operas.

=== Symphonic works ===
- Symphony No. 1 in F sharp minor, Op. 4 (1907-1908, UA Berlin 1909)
- Symphony No. 2, Op. 51 (1922; Orchestrated 1937)
- Symphony No. 3, “Rhapsodie”, Op. 73 (1927)
- Symphony No. 4 for String Orchestra, Op. 160 (1938)
- Spring and Autumn, Symphonic sketches, Op. 14
- Wieland the Blacksmith, (original title: "Wieland der Schmied") Symphonic Poem for large orchestra after Lienhard, Op. 23
- Pan's Death, (original title: "Pans Tod") Legend for large orchestra and mixed chorus ad. lib., Op. 24
- Hodler-Suite, Op. 74
- Uriel, Symphonic Poem for large orchestra, Op. 155
- Suite I. und II. aus der Musik zu «Mönch Wanderer» (LvdP), Op. 84b

=== Works for chamber orchestra ===
- TIAOAIT, für Orchester Op. 29a
- Planetentanz, für Orchester, Op. 29b
- Musik zum «Märchen vom Quellenwunder», für Orchester, Op. 34a
- Musik zu «Orphische Urworte» (Goethe), Op. 39b
- Suite, für Streichorchester, Op. 90
- Trittico Ludovisiano, für Kammerorchester, Op. 102
- Zweite Phantasie für Orchester, Op. 179
- Musik zu «Luzifer und Ahriman»; Op. 245a

=== Opera ===
- Legende von der Prinzessin und dem gefesselten Jüngling (LvdP) Op. 17
- Der Berg des Heiligen Michael (LvdP), Op. 71
- Eisenhand (LvdP), Op. 85
- Michael (LvdP), Oratorien-Oper in einem Aufzug, für Sopran (Tenor), Baß, Chor und Orchester, Op. 95
- Hero und Leander (LvdP), Op. 137
- Der Schweinehirt (H. C. Andersen, LvdP), Op. 140
- Apollo (LvdP), Op. 158
- Medusa (LvdP), Op. 215

=== Cantatas and Oratories ===
- Du brachtest uns nur Liebe, Güte und Frieden (LvdP), JW
- Lieder und Chöre zu den Oberuferer Weihnachtsspielen, Op. 20
- Die zur Wahrheit wandern (Chr. Morgenstern), für gemischten Chor und Orchester, Op. 32
- Weihnacht (R. Steiner), Kantate für Sopran solo, Chor und Orchester, Op. 68
- Michael (LvdP), Oratorien-Oper in einem Aufzug, für Sopran (Tenor), Baß, Chor und Orchester, Op. 95
- 21 Japanische Utas, für Altstimme und Kammerorch. oder Klavier, Op. 119
- Anthroposophisches Requiem (R. Steiner), für Sopran solo, gemischten Chor, Streicher und Orgel oder Harmonium, Op. 200
- Vedische Hymne (U: H. Olivenberg), für Tenor solo, gemischten Chor und Orchester, Op. 232
- Preghiera (S. Francesco), für Tenor solo, gemischten Chor und Orchester, Op. 237

=== Choir a Capella ===
- Gebete an Maria, 10 Lieder für gemischten Chor a cappella, Op. 82
- Zwei Weihnachtslieder, für gemischten Chor a cappella, Op. 109
- Michael-Feier (R. Steiner), für gemischten Chor a cappella, Op. 199

=== Lieder ===
- 5 Lieder nach Japanischen Gedichten, Op. 1
- 4 Lieder nach altgriechischen Liebesgedichten (Asklepiades, Meleagros), Op. 2
- 3 Lieder (J. Milakowiá, Ü: Ed. Koller, Wang-Seng-Yu, Ü: C. Haussmann, M. Madeleine), Op. 3
- Die Hände mein (russisch, Ü: LvdP), Op. 5
- Drei Gesänge (M. Geissler), Op. 6
- Drei Gesänge (H. Dupré), Op. 7
- Zwei Gesänge (A. Negri), Op. 8
- Lieder (0. J. Bierbaum), Op. 11
- La Muse d'Eleusis (E. Schuré) 2 Lieder, Op. 12
- Asali (J. P. Jakobsen, Ü: B. Federn) 3 Lieder, Op. 18
- 3 Lieder (1: L. Gaj, Ü: E. Koller; 2,3: J.P. Jakobsen; Ü: E. Federn), Op. 21
- 4 Lieder (Fr. Lienhard), Op. 22
- 7 Lieder (W. Solowieff, Ü: LvdP), Op. 25
- Es ist in dieser Sonnenstunde (R. Steiner), Op. 28a
- 7 Lieder (Chr. Morgenstern), Op. 30
- 4 Lieder (A. Belyj, Ü: LvdP), Op. 31
- Geistliches Wiegenlied zu Weihnachten (VU), Op. 39/2
- Weihnachtsgesang, für Gesang und Klavier, Op. 44
- 3 nächtliche Lieder (Goethe), Singstimme, Violoncello und Klavier, Op. 57
- 7 Rennefeld-Lieder (0. Rennefeld), Op. 59
- 24 Lieder (A. Steffen), Op. 62
- 8 Lieder (J.P. Jacobsen, Ü: E. Federn), Op. 65
- 21 Lieder (R. Steiner), Op. 67a
- 6 Lieder (R. Steiner), Op. 67b
- 2 Lieder (P. Bühler), Op. 72
- 8 Madonnen-Lieder (LvdP), erste Folge, Op. 76
- 3 Weihnachtslieder (LvdP), Op. 77
- 5 Lieder (1: LvdP, 2: C. F. Meyer, 3: Li-Tai-Po, 4: LvP, 5: M. Bauer), Op. 81
- 6 Lieder (L. Kuckuck), Op. 83
- 5 Madonnen-Lieder (LvdP), zweite Folge, Op. 86
- Engelweben (H. von May), 7 Lieder, Op. 87
- Christus-Lieder (H. von May), 12 Lieder, Op. 88
- 5 Madonnen-Lieder (LvdP), dritte Folge, Op. 91
- 5 Madonnen-Lieder (LvdP), vierte Folge, Op. 92
- Fünf Gesänge (LvdP), Op. 93
- 9 Lieder des Herbstes (LvdP), Op. 94
- In Memoriam,«Dem Geiste meiner Frau», 45 Lieder (LvdP), Op. 96
- 22 Lieder (Chr. Morgenstern), Op. 104
- 5 Lieder (LvP), Op. 105
- 10 Lieder des Sommers (LvP), Op. 106
- 2 Lieder (A. Strindberg, U: E. Schering), Op. 110
- 5 Lieder (E. A. Poe, U: Th. Etzel), Op. 111
- Lieder des Abends (R. M. Rilke), 9 Lieder, Op. 112
- Träumen (R. M. Rilke), 12 Lieder, Op. 113
- Venedig (R. M. Rilke), 4 Gondellieder, Op. 114
- Liebe (R. M. Rilke), 7 Lieder, Op. 115
- Der Tag entschlummert leise (R.M. Rilke), 18 Lieder, Op. 116
- 6 Lieder (0. Fränkl), Op. 117
- 21 Japanische Utas, für Altstimme und Kammerorch. oder Klavier, Op. 119
- Lieder (Li-Tai-Po), Op. 125
- 3 geistliche Gesänge, Op. 127
- 9 Lieder (M. Modena), Op. 129
- 22 Lieder (E. Krell), Op. 130
- 5 Lieder (P. Mac Kaye, U: A: Steffen), Op. 133
- Flötenlieder (chinesische Gedichte), 3 Lieder für Sopran, Flöte und Klavier, Op. 136
- 6 Madonnen-Lieder (LvdP), fünfte Folge, Op. 138
- Allerseelen (LvP), 3 Lieder, Op. 139
- 9 Lieder (Fragmente von Sappho, U: B. Steiner), für Alt und Klavier, Op. 145
- 5 Weihnachtslieder im Volkston («nach alten Gedichten»), für Alt und Streichquartett oder Klavier, Op. 148
- Marias Klagegesang am Kreuze Christi» (LvdP), Op. 149
- 24 Lieder (R. Waldstetter), Op. 150
- Bald (M. Beheim-Schwarzbach), Op. 151
- 3 Marienlieder (lateinisches Kirchenlied; Novalis), Op. 152
- Zwei Lieder (indisch, U: 0. v. Glasenapp), Op. 156
- 8 Lieder (A. Steffen), Op. 157
- 7 Lieder des Sommers (LvdP), Op. 161
- 20 Lieder (Chr. Morgenstern), Op. 181
- 6 Lieder (C. F. Meyer), Op. 187
- 2 Lieder (W. Hauschka), Op. 188
- 8 Lieder des Herbstes (LvdP), Op. 196
- 2 Lieder (LvdP), Op. 197
- 14 Geistliche Lieder (Novalis), Op. 198
- 7 Lieder (alte geistliche Gedichte), Op. 210
- 8 Lieder (neuere geistliche Gedichte von Herder, Seume, Kerner, Rückert, Mörike, C.F. Meyer, Dehmel, Mereskowskij), Op. 211
- 2 Rosenlieder (P. Bühler), Op. 223
- Weihnachtsspruch (P. Bühler), Op. 223a
- Inka-Lied, Op. 224
- Die Goldene (Alt-ägyptische Gedichte, U: S. Schott), 4 Lieder, Op. 225
- 2 Blumenlieder (P. Bühler), Op. 229
- 6 Gesänge, nach modernen Negergedichten, Op. 229
- Eiland (E. Krell-Werth), 27 Lieder, Op. 233
- Zwillingsblume (E. Krell-Werth), 14 Lieder, Op. 234
- 24 Lieder (Japanische Haiku), Op. 238
- Musik zum Puppenspiel «Die Wundergaben» (Gozzi), für Gesang und Streichquartett, Op. 97
- Musik zum Marionettenspiel «Hänsel und Gretel» (H. Proskauer), für Gesang, Flöte, Glockenspiel und Klavier, Op. 170
- Musik zu «Schneeweisschen und Rosenrot» (Grimm), für Gesang und Klavier, Op. 252

=== Piano ===
- Konzert, für Klavier und Orchester, Op. 100
- I Sonate, Op. 38
- II Sonate, “Kleine Sonate, für Klavier”, Op. 121
- III Sonate, Op. 143
- IV Sonate, Op. 227
- I Suite, “Miniatur-Tanzsuite”, für Klavier, Op. 118
- I Suite, “Bessenich-Suite”, für Klavier, Op. 123
- III Suite, für Klavier, Op. 227
- “Kaleidoskop”, Suite für Klavier, Op. 159
- Zwei Stimmungsbilder, Op. 9
- Stimmungen, 4 Stücke, Op. 15
- In Memoriam, Op. 16
- Präludium und Fuge, Op. 26
- 5 kleine Präludien, für Klavier, Op. 45
- 10 Stücke, für Klavier, Op. 70
- 8 kleine Phantasiestücke, für Klavier, Op. 80
- Miniaturen, für Klavier erste Folge Klavierminiaturen, 4 Stücke, Op. 124
- 3 Fugen, Op. 132
- Miniaturen, 4 Stücke für Klavier, zweite Folge, Op. 134
- 33 Variationen und Fuge über S.B.B.-C.F.F, Op. 135
- 12 kleine Stücke, Op. 177
- 7 ganz kleine Klavierstücke, Op. 188/1
- Drei Musiken zu Feiern, Op. 204
- In Memoriam Dimitri von Laar-Larski, Op. 206
- Musik zu Jahresfesten, Op. 213
- Groteske, Op. 214
- Studien in Planetentonarten, 7 Stücke für Klavier, Op. 222
- 2 Stücke, Op. 239
- 7 kleine Klavierstücke, Op. 247
- Aphorismen, 25 kleine Klavierstücke, Op. 249
- Schneewittchen, Bühnenmusik für Klavier, Op. 28
- Auftakte zu Eurythmischen Darstellungen, für Klavier, Op. 29
- Romantischer Auftakt, für Klavier, Op. 35/1
- Eurythmie-Übungen, 28 musikalische Begleitmotive für Klavier, Op. 36
- Merkur-Auftakt, Fassung für Klavier, Op. 37b (Merkur-Auftakt, für Kammerensemble, Op. 37a)
- Musik zu «Melodie» (L. Jacobowski), Op. 39/1
- Auftakt zu «Elfenliedchen» (Goethe), für Klavier, Op. 40/1
- Musik zu «Frühling» (R. Steiner), für Klavier, Op. 40/2
- Musik zu «Butterblumengelbe Wiesen» (Chr. Morgenstern), Op. 40/3
- Musik zum «Märchen vom Quellenwunder», für Klavier, Op. 41
- Musik zu «Orphische Urworte» (Goethe), für Klavier, Op. 42
- Auftakt Achteck, für Klavier, Op. 47/1
- Musik zu «Wanderers Sturmlied» (Goethe), für Klavier, Op. 47/2
- Musik zu «Chor der Urträume» (F. von Steinwand), für Klavier vierhändig, Op. 49/1
- Musik zu «Das Verhängnis» (F. von Steinwand), für Klavier, Op. 49/2
- Musik zu «Lied des Ariel» (aus Shakespeares Sturm), für Klavier, Op. 50/1
- Musik zu «Lied des Amiens» (aus Shakespeares Wie es euch gefällt), für Klavier, Op. 50/2
- Musik zu «Orpheus' Lied» (aus Shakespeares Heinrich VIII.), Op. 50/3
- Musik zu «Pack clouds away», für Klavier, Op. 50/4
- Musik zu einem Alt-Englischen Weihnachtsspiel (Anonymus), Op. 69
- Musik zu dem Legendenspiel «Mönch Wanderer», Op. 84a
- Musik zu «Overheard on a saltmarsh» (H. Monro), für Klavier, Op. 117a
- Musik zum Marionettenspiel «Rotkäppchen» (H. Proskauer); Op. 163
- Musik zu «Sea-farer» (alt-keltisch), für Klavier, Op. 167
- Musik zu «Lebenslied» (R. Hamerling), für Klavier, Op. 168
- 7 Kompositionen für Eurythmie, für Klavier, Op. 169
- Musik zu «Thomas the Rhymer» (W. Scott), für Klavier, Op. 174
- Musik zum Märchen «Die Gänsemagd» (Grimm), Op. 180
- Musik zu «Das Wort wallt in der Welt» (R. Steiner), für Klavier, Op. 185a
- Musik zu «Herbst» (R. Steiner), für Klavier, Op. 185b
- Musik zu «Hirtenlied in der Weihnacht», für Klavier, Op. 191/2a
- Musik zu «Mignon» (Goethe), für Klavier, Op. 195
- Musik zu «Elfenlied» (Shakespeare), für Klavier, Op. 202
- Musik zu Sprüchen aus dem «Cherubinischen Wandersmann» (A. Silesius), für Klavier, Op. 201
- Musik zu «A, nour dérobant le miel» (Anakreon), für Klavier, Op. 205/1
- Musik zu Szenen aus «Der Hüter der Schwelle» (R. Steiner), Op. 207 (Nachspiel, aus op. 207, für Orchester, Op. 207a)
- Musik zu «Rotkäppchen» (Grimm), Op. 209
- Musik zu «Hymnus an die Freude» (Schiller), für Klavier, Op. 220
- Musik zu «Es plaudert der Bach» (M. Garff), für Klavier, Op. 226
- Flammenauftakt, für Klavier, Op. 230
- Musik zu «Die Huldigung der Künste» (Schiller), für Klavier, Op. 236a
- Musik zum Puppenspiel «Von der schönen und der lieben Puppe», Op. 242
- Musik zu «Luzifer und Ahriman» (R. Steiner), für Klavier, Op. 245

=== Violin ===
- Konzertstück, für Violine mit Orchesterbegleitung in h-Moll, Op. 10
- I Sonate für Violine und Klavier, Op. 58
- II Sonate für Violine und Klavier, Op. 63
- III Sonate, Duo für Violine und Klavier, Op. 101
- IV Sonate für Violine und Klavier, Op. 141
- V Sonate für Violine und Klavier, Op. 142
- VI Sonate für Violine und Klavier, Op. 221
- Solosonate für Violine, Op. 131
- Suite zur russischen Legende «Stern der Sterne» (A. Remisoff), für Violine und Klavier, Op. 120
- Suite, für Violine und Klavier, Op. 248
- Menuett, für Violine und Klavier, Op. 75/1
- Musik für Violine und Klavier, Op. 74/3
- 3 Improvisationen, für Violine und Klavier, Op. 103
- In Memoriam Jan Stuten, für 2 Violinen und Klavier, Op. 173
- 4 Stücke, für Violine und Klavier, Op. 178
- 3 Stücke, für Violine und Klavier, Op. 178a
- Stück, für Violine und Orgel, Op. 183
- Zwei Stücke, für Violine und Klavier, Op. 190
- In Memoriam D.Armstrong, für Violine und Harmonium (Klavier), Op. 212
- 2 Stücke, für Violine und Klavier, Op. 243
- Musik zu «Drei Seufzer» (A. Steffen), für Violine und Klavier, Op. 153a
- Musik zu «La Naissance de Merlin» (E. Schuré), Suite für Violine und Klavier, Op. 162
- Musik zu «Venedig» (Nietzsche), für Violine und Klavier, Op. 165
- Musik zu «Besiegung des Winters durch den Frühling» (I. Metaxa), für Violine und Klavier, Op. 172a
- Musik zu «Herbstgruß» (0. Fränkl), für Violine und Klavier, Op. 182/2a
- Musik zu «Soleils couchants» (V. Hugo), für Violine und Klavier, Op. 189
- Musik zu «Aan Rembrandt» (A. Verwey), für Violine und Klavier, Op. 216
- Musik zu «Nala und Damajanti» (indische Legende), für Violine, Violoncello, Glockenspiel und Klavier, Op. 236b

=== Viola ===
- Concertino, für Bratsche und Streichorchester, Op. 108
- Solosonate, Op. 146
- Musik zu «Die Geheimnisse» (Goethe), für Viola und Klavier, Op. 219

=== Cello ===
- I Sonate, d-Moll für Cello und Klavier, Op. 5a
- II Sonate, für Violoncello und Klavier, Op. 48
- Solosonate, Op. 64
- Suite, für Violoncello und Klavier, Op. 122
- Concertino, für Cello und Orchester, (adapted from the Concertino for Saxophone or Viola and Strings) Op. 108
- Elegie, Op. 27
- 2 Stücke, für Violoncello und Klavier, Op. 53
- 2 Stücke, für Violoncello und Klavier, Op. 240

=== Chambermusic for Strings ===
- Duo-Sonate, für Violine und Violoncello, Op. 55
- Drei Stücke, für verschiedene Instrumente, Op. 154

-Pezzo lirico op. 154/1, für Harfe und Violoncello -Pezzo elegiaco op. 154/2, für Oboe und Bratsche -Pezzo giocoso op. 154/3, für Flöte und Violoncello

- Pianotrio, Op. 56
- Musik für Violine, Violoncello und Klavier, Op. 75 Nr. 2
- Trio-Phantasie, Op. 192
- Vorspiel zur Eurythmie, für Violine, Violoncello und Klavier, Op. 235
- Stringtrio, Op. 107
- I Streichquartett, Op. 33
- II Streichquartett, Op. 66
- III Streichquartett, “Metamorphosen”, Op. 79
- IV Streichquartett, Op. 89
- V Streichquartett, auch “4 kleine Stücke für Streichorchester”, Op. 144
- VI Streichquartett, Op. 186
- In Memoriam Marie Steiner, Op. 176
- Musik zum Märchen «Schneeweisschen und Rosenrot», für Streichquartett und Klavier, Op. 171
- Musik zu «Die Erwartung» (Schiller), für Streichquartett oder Klavier, Op.166
- Musik zu «Pierrot lunaire» (Giraud, Ü: 0. E. Hartleben), für Oboe, Violine, Violoncello und Klavier, Op. 46
- Tijdloos Gelaat, 3 Stücke für Flöte, Violine, Violoncello und Klavier, Op. 203

=== Chambermusic for Winds ===
- Suite, für Klarinette und Klavier, Op. 248
- Stück, für Violine und Klarinette, Op. 246
- Präludium und Allegro, für Oboe und Klavier, Op. 99
- Quintett, für Flöte und Streichquartett, Op. 78
- Kleine Suite, für 2 Flöten und Klavier, Op. 60
- Musik, für Flöte und Klavier, Op. 75/3
- 5 Stücke, für Flöte und Klavier, Op. 126
- Flötenlieder (chinesische Gedichte), 3 Lieder für Sopran, Flöte und Klavier, Op. 136
- 2 Stücke, für Flöte und Klavier, Op. 241
- 4 kleine Stücke, für Flöte solo, Op. 250
- Vor- und Nachtakt zu «Wind und Geige» (Chr. Morgenstern), für Violine, Oboe und Klavier, Op. 34b
- Intermezzo, für Ton-Eurythmie bzw. Flöte oder Geige und Klavier, Op. 35/2
- Musik zu «Pierrot lunaire» (Giraud, Ü: 0. E. Hartleben), für Oboe, Violine, Violoncello und Klavier, Op. 46
- Musik zu «Orpheus und Euridice», für 2 Flöten und 2 Violinen, Op. 98
- Musik zu «Jorinde und Joringel», für Flöte und Streichquartett, Op. 164
- Musik zu «Göttliche Komödie» (Dante), für Flöte und Harfe oder Klavier, Op. 191/1
- Musik zu «West-östlicher Divan» (Goethe), für Flöte und Harfe, Op. 194
- Musik zu «Lajeune Tarrentine» (A. Chenier), für Flöte, Violine und Klavier, Op. 205/2
- Musik zum Puppenspiel «Sommerrätsel», für Violine oder Flöte, Triangel, Glocken und Klavier, Op. 208
- Musik zu «Mondnacht auf dem Meere» (Li Oey), für Flöte, Glockenspiel und Klavier, Op. 217
- Musik zu «Die Schule des Silen» (C. F. Meyer), für Flöte und Klav., Op. 218
- Musik zu «Gartenpflege» (A. Steffen), für Flöte, Violine, Violoncello und Klavier oder Orgel, Op. 236c
- Musik zu «Hymnus aus Phaistos» (E: Schuré), für Flöte und Streichquartett, Op. 244
- Musik zu «Der Eintritt der Seele ins Jenseits» (E. Schurh), für Flöte und Streichquartett, Op. 244a

=== Harp ===
- Sonate, für Harfe solo, Op. 147
- Musik zu «Göttliche Komödie» (Dante), für Flöte und Harfe oder Klavier, Op. 191/1
- Musik zu «West-östlicher Divan» (Goethe), für Flöte und Harfe, Op. 194

=== Organ ===
- Präludium, für Orgel, Op. 43
- Pièce pour Violon et Orgue, Op. 183

== Recordings ==
- Leopold van der Pals, Works for Cello and Piano • Tobias van der Pals, cello • Cathrine Penderup, piano Polyhymnia Forlag © Gateway Music · SOUNDCLOUD
- Leopold van der Pals, Sonata, Duo, Trio & 3 Fugues • Elisabeth Zeuthen Schneider, violin • Tobias van der Pals, cello • Kristoffer Hyldig, piano Polyhymnia Forlag © Gateway Music · SOUNDCLOUD ”5 Records of the Year, 2016" Awarded by Scott Noriega, Fanfare Magazine "Want List”
- Leopold van der Pals, Symphony No.1 op in F sharp minor ”Fruling und Herbst”, op 14. ”Wieland der Schmied”, op 23 Helsingborg Symphony Orchestra, Sweden. Conductor Johannes Goritzki. Recorded by CPO, Germany.

== Literature ==
- ”Leopold van der Pals. Komponieren fur eine neue Kunst”. Dr Wolfram Graf. PhD thesis, ISBN 3723511554
- "Unter dem Zeichen des Rosenkreuzes. Leopold van der Pals' esoterische Schülerschaft bei Rudolf Steiner", ISBN 3723512232
- ”Anthroposopfy im 20. Jahrhunder”. ”Ein Kulturimpuls in Biografischen Porträts” Bodo von Plato (Hg.), ISBN 978-3-7235-1199-2"
- "Compositori europei in pagine vocali o corali agli esordi del XX secolo: Carlevarini, L. Manenti E. Dagnino, Antonio ed Alfredo Cece, Alfredo Macchitella, Giuseppe Giacomantonio, Carlevarini, C.De Rosa, H. J. Pestalozzi, L. Tosi, Gilse Van Der Pals"; Dr Mario-Giuseppe Genesi in: "Archivio Storico Lodigiano", "Società Storica Lodigiana" Lodi (I), 2021, year CXL.
