= Hans Kniep =

German botanist (1881–1930)

Karl Johannes Kniep (3 April 1881 – 17 November 1930) was a German botanist who was a native of Jena.

He studied medicine at the University of Kiel, and botany in Jena with Christian Ernst Stahl (1848-1919), where in 1904 he received his doctorate. Afterwards, he worked as an assistant to Robert Hippolyte Chodat (1865-1934) in Geneva, to Wilhelm Pfeffer (1845-1920) at Leipzig, and under Friedrich Oltmanns (1860-1945) in Freiburg. Later, he conducted physiological research of algae in Bergen.

Beginning in 1907, he was a private lecturer at the University of Freiburg, followed by an associate professorship at the University of Strasbourg (1911). In 1914 Kniep became a full professor at the University of Würzburg, where he was also served as dean of the university (1923–24). In 1924 he succeeded Gottlieb Haberlandt (1854-1945) as professor of plant physiology at the University of Berlin. During his career, he undertook study trips to the Balearic Islands, Corsica, Norway, Italy, the Caucasus region, Netherlands East Indies and Japan.

== Works ==
Kniep is remembered for studies of sexuality in lower plants. He also conducted phytophysiological research of chemotaxis and nastic movements, as well as ecophysiological investigations involving photosynthesis and respiration of marine plants. Furthermore, he did extensive studies on the cytology and genetics of fungi, especially basidiomycetes. From 1913 to 1917, he published five treatises on the fungal class Hymenomycetes:

- Beiträge zur Kenntnis der Hymenomyceten: I. Die Entwicklungsgeschichte von Hypochnus terrestris nov. spec. - 1913, Zeitschrift für Botanik 5 pp. 593 – 637
- Beiträge zur Kenntnis der Hymenomyceten: II. Über die Herkunft der Kernpaare im Fruchtkörper von Coprinus nycthemerus - 1913, Zeitschrift für Botanik 5 pp. 593 – 637
- Beiträge zur Kenntnis der Hymenomyceten: III. Über die konjugierten Teilungen und die phylogenetische Bedeutung der Schnallenbildungen - 1915, Zeitschrift für Botanik 7 pp. 369 – 398.
- Beiträge zur Kenntnis der Hymenomyceten: IV. Über den Ursprung und die ersten Entwicklungsstadien der Basidien - 1916, Zeitschrift für Botanik 8 pp. 353 – 359.
- Beiträge zur Kenntnis der Hymenomyceten: V. Über die Entstehung der Paarkernigkeit der Zellen des Schnallenmycels - 1917, Zeitschrift für Botanik 9 pp. 81 – 118.

Other significant writings by Kniep include:

- Über rhythmische Lebensvorgänge bei den Pflanzen, 1915 – On rhythmic life processes in plants.
- Über morphologische und physiologische Geschlechtsdifferenzierung, 1920 – On morphological and physiological sex differentiation.
- Über Geschlechtsbestimmung und Reduktionsteilung, 1922 – On sex determination and meiosis.
- Die Sexualität der niederen Pflanzen, 1928 – Sexuality of lower plants.

With Friedrich Oltmanns, he was editor of the botanical magazine, "Zeitschrift für Botanik".
