= Der Türmer =

German magazine

Der Türmer. Monatsschrift für Gemüt und Geist was the name of a national conservative, Protestant cultural journal, which appeared first in Stuttgart and then in Berlin from 1898 to 1943 and was published for a long time by the Baltic German writer Jeannot Emil von Grotthuß, who lived in Bad Oeynhausen. The name was intended to refer to the tower keeper from Faust, Part Two: "Zum Sehen geboren, zum Schauen bestellt." (Born to see, ordered to look.)

== History ==
The journal sought to give a view of the entire intellectual and social culture of the present day; since 1902 the "Türmer-Jahrbuch" (Türmer Yearbook) had been published alongside. Grotthuß made der Türmer a central cultural and political medium of the Wilhelminian period. From 3000 (in 1899), the number of copies printed per month climbed to 17,500. In the section "Türmers Tagebuch" Grotthuß attacked the social democracy, court nobility, money aristocracy and industry, which he accused of "Byzantinism", Klassenjustiz and "political eunuchy". In 1918, he positioned himself against the republic and became a fierce advocate of the Stab-in-the-back myth. When he died in 1920, der Türmer was "well on his way to becoming one of the strongest and most dangerous opponents of the Weimar system". Grotthuß oriented himself towards the Heimatkunst movement. His successor was the Alsatian Heimatkünstler Friedrich Lienhard, who steered the magazine into völkische waters. In 1929, the early National Socialist Friedrich Castelle took over the publication and brought in the two völkisch magazines Deutsche Monatshefte and Die Bergstadt. In 1943, the magazine was integrated into the Westermanns Monatshefte. The printing and publishing of the magazine was done by Greiner and Pfeifer in Stuttgart until 1930, then by the national socialist Beenken-Verlag.

Walter Ehrenstein, Hedwig Forstreuter, Stephan Ley, Otto Rennefeld, Otto von Taube, Karl August Walther and Reinhold Zimmermann were among the authors writing for der Türmer.
