= Reinhold Zimmermann =

German musicologist

Reinhold Zimmermann (11 August 1889 – 4 April 1956) was a German school headmaster, choir conductor and musicologist.

== Life ==
Born in Aachen, Zimmermann became a teacher in Aachen in 1910 and in 1941 he became elementary school headmaster there. In 1920, he became music editor of the magazine Der Türmer and later wrote especially for the Neue Zeitschrift für Musik. From 1925 to 1939, he gave youth concerts in Aachen.

In his obituary about Zimmermann, Hans Joachim Moser writes: "One of his favourite areas was the question of 'music and race', but he never went down the wrong path with his great knowledge of anthropological research. Like his friend Moser, however, Zimmermann was one of the most ardent advocates of Nazi ideology, and as early as 1920 he stood out with antisemitic outbursts against the "spirit of internationalism in music". Already in 1923, he became a member of the NSDAP and, in 1933, a member of the National Socialist Teachers League. Later, he was a member of the Reich Chamber of Literature "Fachschriftsteller für Musik und Rassenkunde" and, from 1936, a member of the Office of Racial Policy. In 1942, he was - according to his own statement - expelled from the NSDAP, according to official documents, but only in 1944. The reasons are not known.

His research focused on Beethoven's adlatus Anton Schindler as well as César Franck and Anton Bruckner. He possessed numerous letters from Beethoven to Schindler, which are now in the Beethoven House in Bonn.

== Publications ==
- Die zweite deutsche Aufführung von Beethoven' Symphony No. 9 zu Aachen am 23. Mai 1825. In Neue Musik-Zeitung, Jg. 42 (1921), pp. 71–74
- Anton Schindlers Aufzeichnungen über die Leistungen der Orchester in Paris und Berlin. In Das Orchester. Halbmonatsschrift zur Förderung der Musik und des Musikerstandes, Jg. 3 (1926), pp. 193f., 205f., 219f.
- A. Schindlers Verhältnis zu der Musik und den Musikern seiner Zeit, auf Grund von Schindlers Tagebuchaufzeichnungen. In Neue Musik-Zeitung, Jg. 47 (1926), pp. 245–250
- Anton Schindler (1795–1864), ein Leben für Beethoven. In Beethoven-Almanach der Deutschen Musikbücherei auf das Jahr 1927, Regensburg 1927, pp. 374–382
- Eine "Aesthetik der Tonkunst" von Anton Schindler. In Allgemeine Musikzeitung, Jg. 57 (1930), pp. 313–316 (Über ein Vorlesungsbuch Schindlers von 1846)
- Ein neuer Beethovenfund in Anton Schindlers Nachlass. In Die Musik, Jg. 23.1, March 1931, pp. 401–414, Reinhold Zimmermann is available for free viewing and download at the Internet Archive (Ein unbekanntes Konversationsheft Beethovens)
- Anmerkungen zu Clauß "Rasse und Charakter". In Die Sonne. Zeitschrift für nordische Weltanschauung, Jg. 13 (1936), issue 4, pp. 154–160
- Rasse und Rhythmus. In Die Sonne. Zeitschrift für nordische Weltanschauung, Jg. 13 (1936), issue 9, pp. 386–397
- Ein Wort für César Franck. In Zeitschrift für Musik, Jg. 105 (1938), pp 71f.
- Um Anton Bruckners Vermächtnis. Ein Beitrag zur rassischen Erkenntnis germanischer Tonkunst. Stuttgart 1939
- Anton Reicha. Der deutsche Lehrer Cäsar Francks in Paris. In Die Musik, Jg. 33 (1940/41), pp. 295–297
- Cäsar Franck. Ein deutscher Musiker in Paris. Heimat-Verlag, Aachen 1942
