= Schiltigheim =

Schiltigheim Schelige (Alsatian)
- Commune
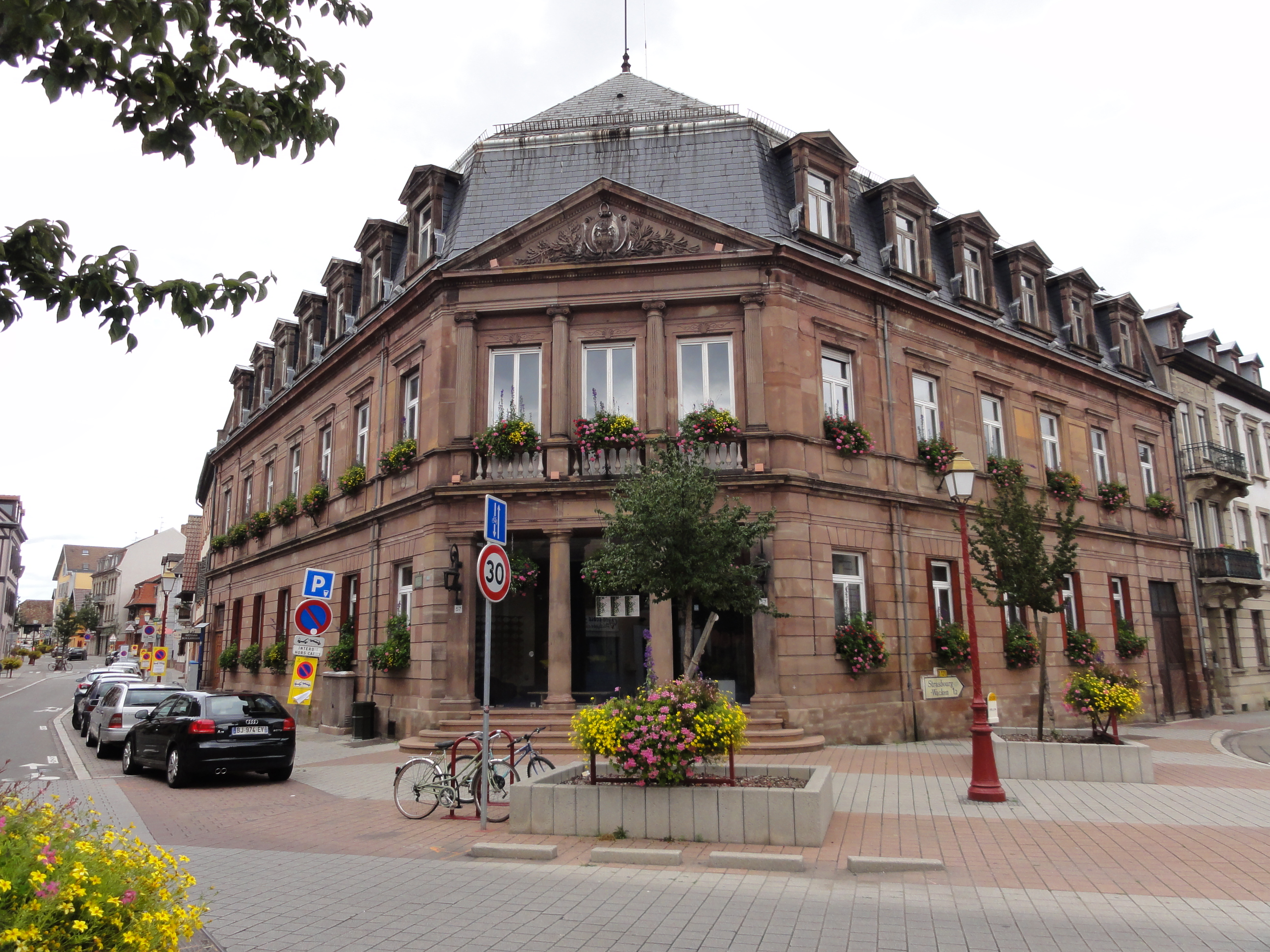
- The old town hall

- Coat of arms
- Location of Schiltigheim
- Location within France Location within Grand Est
- Coordinates: 48°36′28″N 7°45′00″E
- Country: France
- Region: Grand Est
- Department: Bas-Rhin
- Arrondissement: Strasbourg
- Canton: Schiltigheim
- Intercommunality: Strasbourg Eurométropole

Government
  - Mayor (2020–2026): Danielle Dambach (EELV)
- Area^{1}: 7.63 km^{2} (2.95 sq mi)
- Elevation: 140 m (460 ft)
- Highest elevation: 152 m (499 ft)
- Lowest elevation: 133 m (436 ft)
- Population (2023): 34,708
  - Density: 4,550/km^{2} (11,800/sq mi)
- Time zone: UTC+01:00 (CET)
  - Summer (DST): UTC+02:00 (CEST)
- INSEE/Postal code: 67447 /67300
- ^{1} French Land Register data, which excludes lakes, ponds, glaciers > 1 km^{2} (0.386 sq mi or 247 acres) and river estuaries.

Schiltigheim (French: Schiltigheim, pronounced [ʃiltiɡajm]; German: Schiltigheim; Alsatian: Schelige [ˈʃelikə]) is a commune located north of the city of Strasbourg in the Bas-Rhin department within the Grand Est region of north-eastern France.

Schiltigheim is located in the historical and cultural region of Alsace which has been administratively integrated into the European Collectivity of Alsace since January 1, 2021.

The inhabitants are called Schilikois in French and Scheligemer in Alsatian.

Schiltigheim is the largest suburb of the city of Strasbourg, and it borders Strasbourg to the north. In 2023, Schiltigheim was the third-most populous commune in Bas-Rhin (after Strasbourg and Haguenau), with a total population of 34,708.

== Toponymy ==
Former names of Schiltigheim include Skitingsbouhel in 845, Scildincheim in 884, Schiltencheim in 1004, or Schiltenkeim in 1275, and even the Frenchified form Chilthiqueim in 1750. Other variations in the 9th century include Schildenchen, Skitingsdtbuel, Sciltenheim, Sckiltencheim, Scildenheim, Schiltingheim, Schiltenheim, Schilckenhaim, Schilken.

In the Strasbourg area, Schilick is a familiar name used to refer to Schiltigheim among both French and German speakers.

== History ==
=== Origin ===
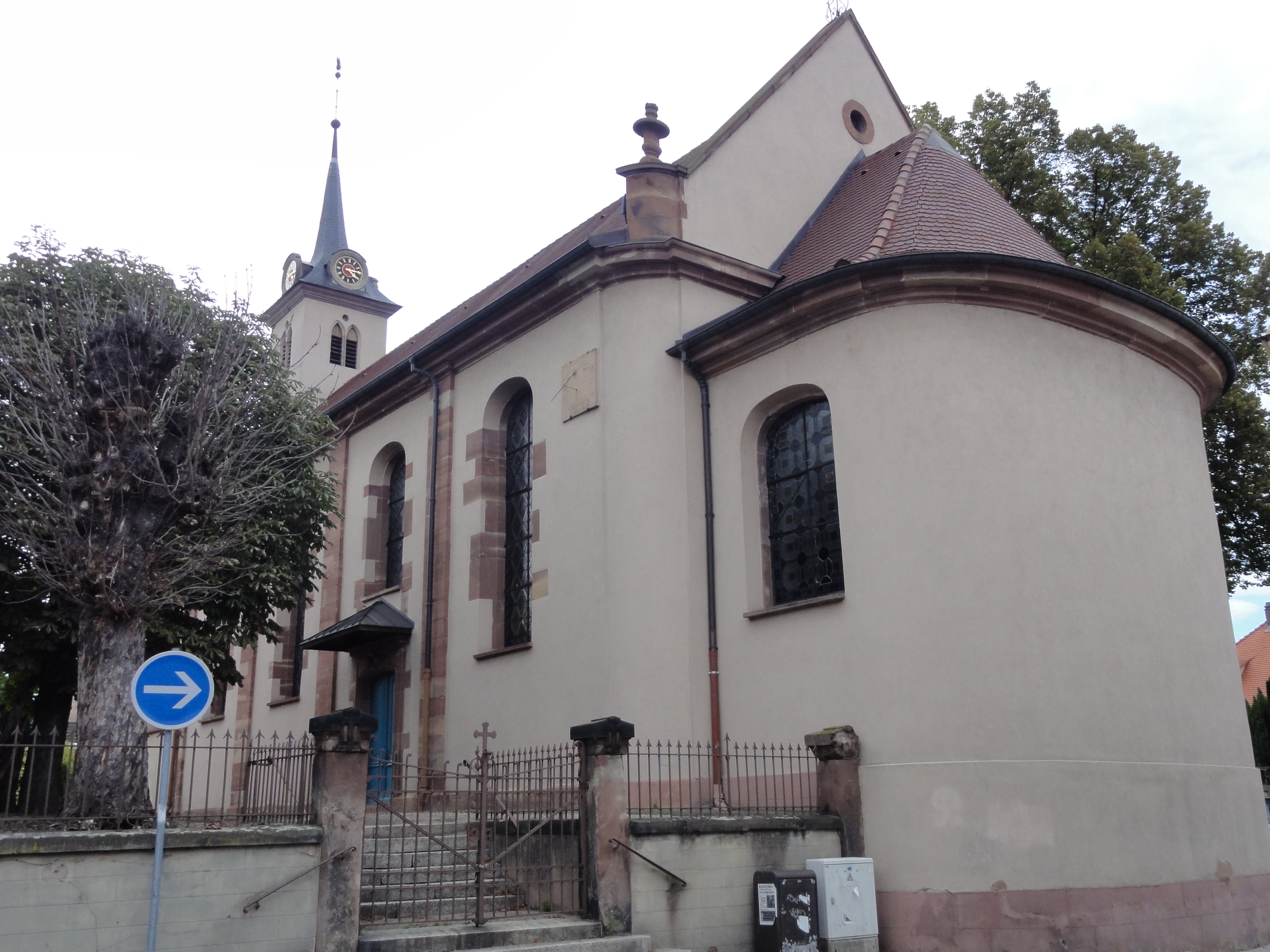
Protestant Church in Schiltigheim

Schiltigheim's origin dates back to at least the 9th century, forming around Sciltung castle, established by a Frankish warror, and Bothebür chapel located on the last hills north of Strasbourg and extending along the slopes down toward the Rhine. The Sciltung castle was located on the hill of the present-day Castle Park in Schiltigheim. Bothebür chapel's exact location is unknown but it may have been located near the present-day Protestant Church of Schiltigheim.

Schiltigheim's development is closely linked to the 14th century arrival of the expelled inhabitants of the ancient village of Adelshoffen who were granted permission to settle in lower Schiltigheim between the present-day streets of La Glacière and Adelshoffen.

=== Middle Ages ===
In 843, after the division of Francia by the Oaths of Strasbourg and the Treaty of Verdun, Schiltigheim became part of Middle Francia under Lothair I. In 845, Lothair I placed 11 estates, including the village of Schiltigheim and its chapel, under ownership of the Abbey of Saint Stephen in Strasbourg.

In 855, when Lothair I died, Schiltigheim became part of Lotharingia under Lothair II to which it remained attached after the reorganization of the Middle Francia lands following the death of Charles of Provence in 863.

In 870, after Lothair II's death in 869 and the Treaty of Meerssen, Schiltigheim became part of East Francia under Louis the German.

In 876, after the death of Louis the German, Schiltigheim fell under the rule of Charles the Fat first as part of eastern Alamannia before joining back into East Francia in 882.

In 962, Schiltigheim already fell under the rule of Otto I when he created and became Emperor of the Holy Roman Empire.

In 1003, Henry II, Holy Roman Emperor gifted the Abbey of Saint Stephen in Strasbourg and all its possessions, including Schiltigheim, to Werner I of Habsburg, bishop of Strasbourg.

In 1255, Henry III of Stahleck granted the nobles of Wagnen the right of Advowson (patronage) to the town of Schiltigheim to settle a dispute between the Abbey of Saint Stephen and those nobles.

In 1389, Schiltigheim was burned by the troops of Emicho, Count of Leningen.

In 1429, the village was largely destroyed during the war between the city of Strasbourg and Bishop Wilhelm II von Diest.

In 1444, the village was destroyed by order of the Strasbourg Magistrates at the approach of the Armagnac army.

In 1463, the abbess of Saint Stephen, Agnes of Rathsamhausen granted the village of Schiltigheim to George of Ochsenstein.

In 1492, ownership transferred to the Hohensteins. Ownership later transferred to the Vôlsch family.

=== Early Modern ===
In 1501, Pierre de Vôlsch sold the village and castle of Schiltigheim to the city of Strasbourg. The city placed the village under management of the Bailiwick of Illkirch which was part of Strasbourg at that time. In that year, Schiltigheim and Adelshoffen were home to 360 Protestant inhabitants with an unknown number of Catholic inhabitants.

In 1507, half of the village of Schiltigheim was reduced to ash by lightning in August 1507.

In 1575, Schiltigheim and Adelshoffen were home to 384 Protestant inhabitants with an unknown number of Catholic inhabitants.

In 1648, Strasbourg and its lands, including Schiltigheim remained a free imperial city within the Holy Roman Empire, even though the Peace of Westphalia ceded most of Alsace to the Kingdom of France.

In 1676, during the Franco-Dutch War, the Strasbourg Magistrate had the Sciltung castle razed to prevent its use against the village. The castle resembled a large tower with tall walls and its position on top of Schillingheim-Bühel hill provided anyone inside with a full view of all surrounding areas.

In September 1681, the city of Strasbourg was annexed to France when the troops of Marshal de Boufflers surrounded Strasbourg and its magistrates surrendered without resistance. This annexation was formally confirmed in 1697 with the Peace of Ryswick.

Starting in 1683, the village of Adelshoffen merged into Schiltigheim with the villages merged into one by 1817.

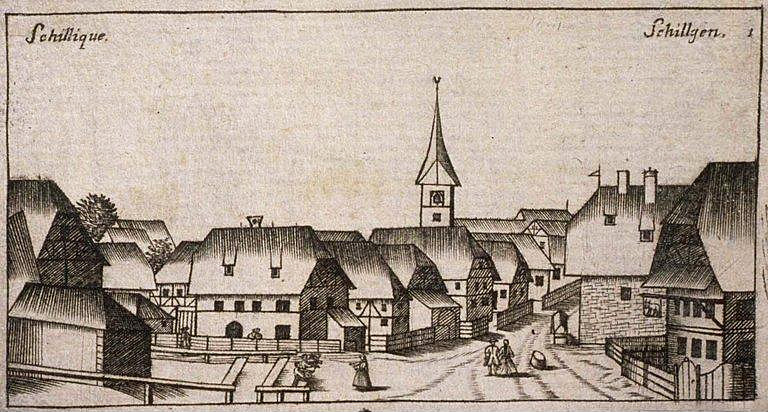
The Village of Schillique (1700)

In 1700, Schiltigheim and Adelshoffen were home to 810 Protestant inhabitants with an unknown number of Catholic inhabitants.

In 1733, the magistrate established a fair and market in Schiltigheim to be held every year in mid-August.

In 1867, Schiltigheim contained approximately 20 Catholic families, 264 Lutheran families and a few Calvinist families. Its territory consisted of a total of 2,383 acres of land, which includes 427 acres from the former Adelshoffen village. At that time, in liue of tithes, landowners pay fixed dues to either the Visitation Monastery of Strasbourg, which held the property of former Saint Stephen's abbey, or to the Chapter of Saint Thomas in the former Adelshoffen territory.

In 1870, during the Siege of Strasbourg, the town of Schiltigheim, occupied by the Prussians, was severely damaged by bombardments. A shell from that era is still embedded in the wall of a house.

In 1871, the Peace of Frankfurt ceded Alsace to the German Empire, which made Schiltigheim part of Alsace–Lorraine under the district of Strasbourg until 1918.

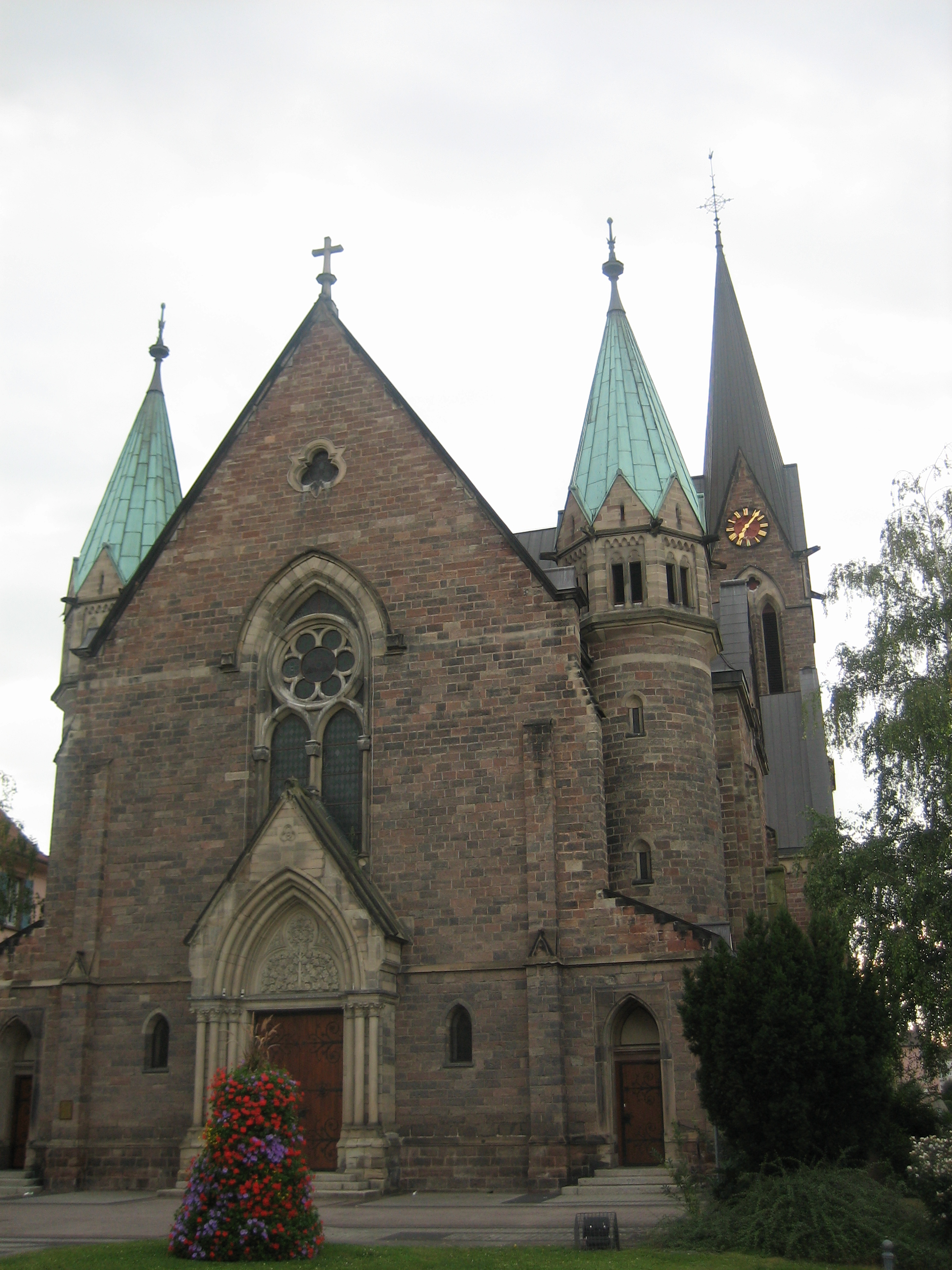
Catholic church Sainte Famille in Schiltigheim

In 1897, construction began for what is now the oldest Catholic church in Schiltigheim, the Church of Sainte Famille, which was consecration in 1899.

Around the turn of the 20th century, Schiltigheim had a Protestant and a Catholic church, a district court, a goose exchange, and factories producing sparkling wine, canned goods, waxed canvas, ornaments, sand-lime brick products, machinery, soap, passementerie, brushes, paper goods, roofing felt, furniture, cigars, footwear, parquet flooring, a brewery, a cooperage and malt house, a brick and gypsum kiln, a goose farm, and timber and wine trades.

=== 20th century ===
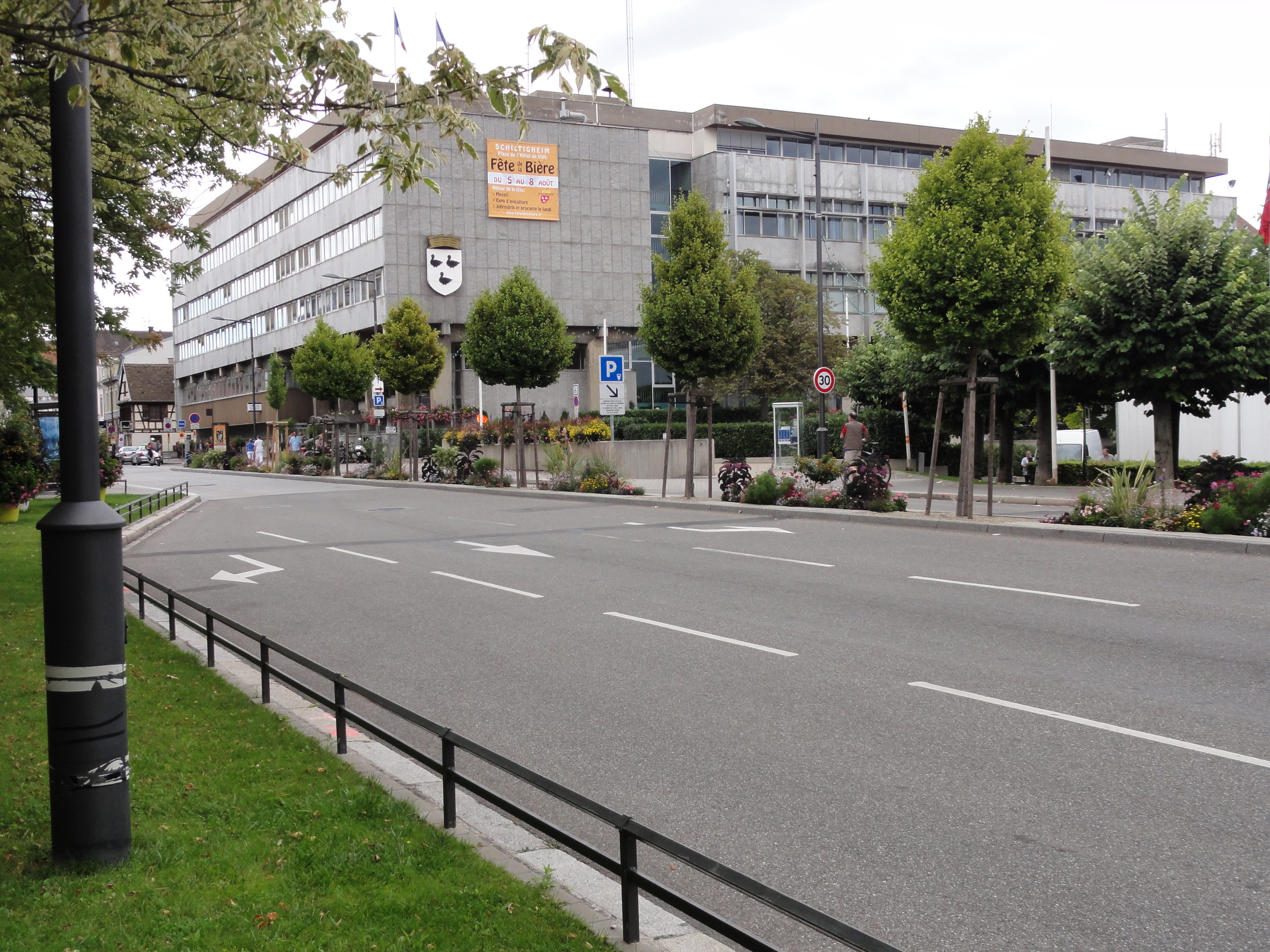
The Hôtel de Ville

In 1919, after World War I, the territory of Alsace-Lorraine was ceded back to France according to provision of the Treaty of Versailles.

During World War II, between 1939 and 1945, Strasbourg and Schiltigheim were occupied by German Wehrmacht and annexed by Nazi Germany. In September 1939, the population was evacuated to the Haute-Vienne region. Returning to Alsace in the summer of 1940, the population endured Nazi annexation until their liberation in November 1944 by General Leclerc's troops.

After World War II, two residents, Hélène Schweitzer Rosenberg (born in Schiltigheim on November 7, 1910) and Gendarme Honoré Haessler (born in Marckolsheim on September 4, 1894), were recognized among the Righteous Among the Nations of France for saving Jewish people persecuted by the Nazi regime and the Vichy government. Gendarme Honoré Haessler was assigned to Schiltigheim from 1830 to 1939, and he systematically warned Jewish families of the arrival of the Germans. Both of these residents symbolize the benevolent attitude of the inhabitants towards the Jewish refugees in Schiltigheim, from which only one family was deported, even though more than 65 Jewish people resided there.

In 1969, Schiltigheim's current Hôtel de Ville (town hall) was completed.

== Population ==
Historical population

Year	Pop.	±% p.a.
1793	1,622	—
1800	1,645	+0.20%
1806	1,587	−0.60%
1821	2,133	+1.99%
1831	2,627	+2.10%
1836	2,794	+1.24%
1841	2,778	−0.11%
1846	2,998	+1.54%
1851	3,349	+2.24%
1856	3,441	+0.54%
1861	3,770	+1.84%
1866	4,265	+2.50%
1871	4,849	+2.60%
1875	5,653	+3.91%
1880	6,507	+2.85%
1885	7,140	+1.87%
1890	7,758	+1.67%
1895	8,609	+2.10%
1900	10,745	+4.53%

Year	Pop.	±% p.a.
1905	14,310	+5.90%
1910	16,761	+3.21%
1921	17,804	+0.55%
1926	19,226	+1.55%
1931	21,217	+1.99%
1936	22,074	+0.80%
1946	22,397	+0.15%
1954	22,798	+0.22%
1962	25,081	+1.20%
1968	29,198	+2.57%
1975	30,144	+0.46%
1982	29,574	−0.27%
1990	29,155	−0.18%
1999	30,841	+0.63%
2007	31,729	+0.36%
2012	31,691	−0.02%
2017	31,894	+0.13%
2023	34,708	+1.42%

Source: EHESS and INSEE (1968-2023)

== Events ==
The present or former home of a number of breweries, Schiltigheim is known for the "fête de la bière" beer festival in August.

== Notable people ==
- Christian Ernst Stahl, (1848-1919), botanist, born in Schiltigheim
- Ernst Barthel (1890-1953) born in Schiltigheim, philosopher, mathematician, inventor
- Jean Weissenbach (1946-), biologist and director of research at CNRS. Was at the primary school Exen Schiltigheim. Currently leads the Genoscope in Évry. In April 2010, the town of Schiltigheim awarded him the title of honorary citizen.
- Yvon Riemer (1970-), wrestler, member of Olympia Schiltigheim. World champion Greco-Roman wrestling in 1995, silver in 1999 and bronze in 1991 and 1993. 5th Olympic Games in Barcelona in 1992
- Thomas Voeckler, cyclist, born in 1979 in Schiltigheim
- Bruno Spengler, racing driver, born in 1983 in Schiltigheim
- Pierre-Hugues Herbert (1991-), tennis player, 5-time doubles Grand Slam champion

== See also ==
- Communes of the Bas-Rhin department
