= Hedwig Forstreuter =

German journalist and writer

Hedwig Forstreuter (12 February 1890 – 15 November 1967), was a German journalist and writer.

== Family ==
Born in Oschersleben, Forstreuter was the daughter of the engineer Hermann Forstreuter and his wife Anna Elise, née Reinhardt. On her father's side, she was descended from Salzburg Protestants. She received her education together with Ella von Klitzing, who was the same age, on the von Klitzing family's Neudorf estate, as the two mothers were friends.

== Journalist and writer ==
After finishing school, Forstreuter received an apprenticeship at the Magdeburger General-Anzeiger. She became editor and later editor of the feuilleton of this newspaper. At the same time, she edited the "Frauen-Beilage", belonging to the same publishing group Magdeburgische Zeitung. In her spare time, she wrote poetry and novellas. Until 1945, she frequently visited the family of her foster sister, who had meanwhile married Friedrich von Arnim, at Schloss Bornsdorf. She wrote there many of her works.

The narrow poetry collections were published in small editions. Forstreuter reached a wider audience by publishing poems in partly renowned journals (for example Die Bergstadt, Die Dame, Die Woche, Jugend, Der Türmer, Westermanns Monatshefte). Her works were positively received by the literature critics.

She wrote the verses of the unprinted picture book Bunte Waldgeschichten and Bärchens Abenteuer created around 1940 by the Magdeburg painter and graphic artist, Wilhelm Höpfner.

After the end of the war, Forstreuter had to give up her job as editor and work as a packer at the newspaper. During this time, she was only able to present her literary works at rare readings. At the beginning of the 1950s, she left the GDR and moved to Hamburg, where the daughters of her now deceased foster sister lived and supported her until the establishment. She took on a position in the administration of the Hamburger Abendblatt. Only rarely published journals her smaller works.

Forstreuter died in Hamburg at the age of 77.

== Poetry prize ==
In 1936, Forstreuter received the poetry prize of the journal "Die Dame" of the "Deutscher Verlag", endowed with 1000 RM, for her poem "Liebende in der Landschaft".

== Work ==
=== Books ===
- Gedichte. Peter Verlag, Magdeburg 1913.
- An der Schwelle. Verlag Broecke, Leipzig (1918).
- Ein Albumblatt von Mozart. Kaiser Friedrich Museum der Stadt Magdeburg, Museumsheft 14. Verlag Wohlfeld, Magdeburg (1920).
- Die Fahrt nach Bimini. Verlag Erich Matthes, Leipzig 1924.
- Stufen zu Gott. Sieben-Stufen-Verlag, Leipzig (1932).
- Zwischenspiel. Eugen Händle Verlag, Mühlacker 1942.
- with Wilhelm Höpfner: Bunte Waldgeschichten (unpublished).
- with Wilhelm Höpfner: Bärchens Abenteuer (unpublished).
- Hedwig Forstreuter among others: Almanach der Dame. Fünfzig auserwählte Gedichte. Propyläen-Verlag, Berlin 1935.
- Hedwig Forstreuter among others: Saat in die Zukunft. Dichter und Schriftsteller des Magdeburger Landes sprechen zu uns. Eine Auslese. Edited by Kulturbund zur demokratischen Erneuerung Deutschlands. Mitteldeutsche Druckerei und Verlagsanstalt, Zweigstelle Magdeburg, (Leipzig) 1947.

=== Poetry ===
- Trübe Stunde. In Jugend vom 15. November 1921. Jg. 26, issue 29. Georg Hirth publishing house, Munich 1921. p. 794.
- Vision. In Jugend vom 15. Mai 1923. Jg. 28, issue 10. Georg Hirth publishing house Munich 1923. p. 296.
- Ungeliebt In Jugend vom 1. August 1923. Jg. 28, issue 15. Georg Hirth publishing house, Munich 1923. p. 449.
- Traum der jungen Frau. In Jugend vom 18. Januar 1930. Jg. 35, issue 4. Georg Hirth publishing house, Munich 1930. p. 53.

=== Articles ===
- Die Auswanderung der Salzburger Protestanten 1731. In Monatsblatt (der Magdeburgischen Zeitung). Jg. 1931, Nr. 73. Verlag Fabersche Buchdruckerei, Magdeburg pp. 341f.
- Ruf über die Grenze. Zu Maria Kahles 50. Geburtstag. Südostdeutsche Zeitung, Organ der Deutschen in Rumänien, vom 5. August 1941. Jg. 68 (23.) Nr. 115, Temeschburg 1941, p. 7.
