= Julius Schaxel =

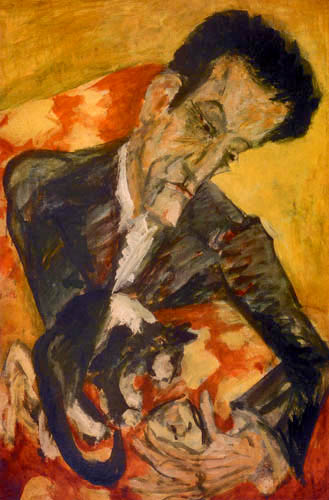
- Prof. Schaxel mit Katze (1917/1918) by Ernst Ludwig Kirchner
- Born: 24 March 1887; Augsburg, Germany
- Died: 15 July 1943 (aged 56); Moscow
- Education: University of Jena (PhD 1909); Ludwig-Maximilians-Universität München
- Known for: Studies of limb regeneration and parabiosis
- Scientific career
- Fields: Developmental biology, theoretical biology
- Workplaces: University of Jena, Soviet Academy of Sciences
- Doctoral advisor: Ludwig Plate
- Other academic advisors: Ernst Haeckel, Richard Hertwig

Julius Christoph Ehregott Schaxel (24 March 1887 – 15 July 1943) was a German developmental biologist and zoologist who was a native of Augsburg.

He initially studied biology, philosophy and psychology at Jena under Ernst Haeckel (1834–1919), then continued his education at the Ludwig-Maximilians-Universität München with Richard Hertwig (1850–1937). In 1909, he obtained his PhD at the University of Jena under Ludwig Plate (1862–1937), where from 1918 until 1933, he worked as an associate professor of zoology. During the rise of Nazism, partly because of his Marxist views and partly owing to his wife's Jewish heritage, he was dismissed from his position at Jena, and in 1933 emigrated to Switzerland, then relocating to Leningrad in the USSR, where he received a position at the Severtsov Evolution and Morphology Institute of the Soviet Academy of Sciences. In 1934 he moved with the institute to Moscow. After a short imprisonment in 1938, Schaxel continued to work both academically and in the German resistance, where he belonged to the NKFD. Schaxel died in a sanatorium near Moscow in July 1943.

Schaxel specialized in the fields of developmental biology and theoretical biology. He is remembered for his research involving limb regeneration and parabiosis of the Mexican axolotl (Ambystoma mexicanum). He practiced biology from a Marxist philosophic standpoint, and was co-founder and editor of the journal Urania (1924 to 1933). In its time, it was a popular magazine known for scientific articles within the framework of Marxist philosophy.
