= Nicolaï van Gilse van der Pals =

Dutch musicologist (1891–1969)

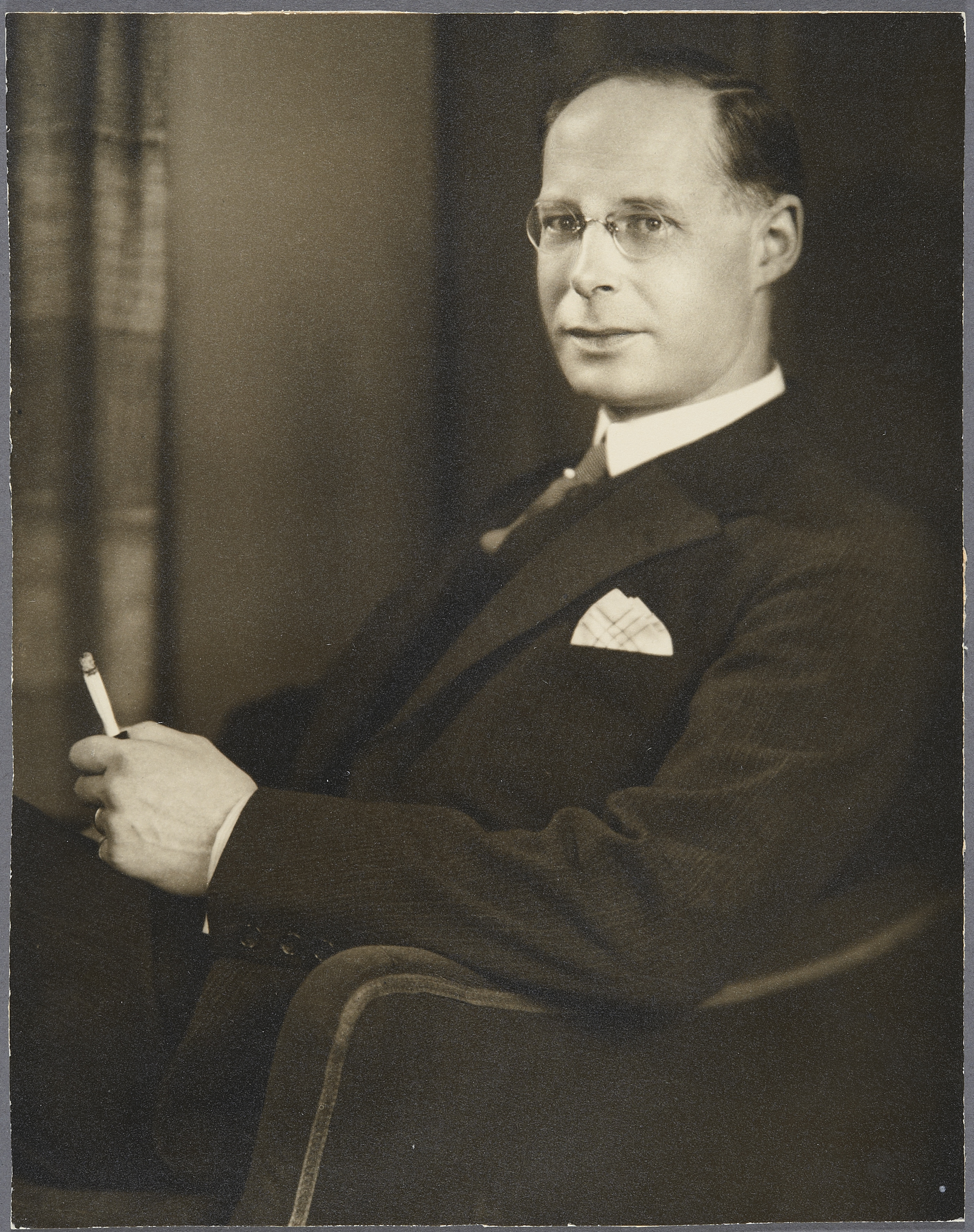
Van der Pals in the 1940s.

Nicolaï Ferdinand van Gilse van der Pals (19 May 1891, St Petersburg – 22 April 1969, Porvoo) was a Dutch-Russian-Finnish conductor and musicologist who wrote biographies of both Pjotr Iljitsch Tschaikowski and Nikolai Rimski-Korsakow.

== Background ==
His father Hendrik van Gilse van der Pals, from a merchant family of Rotterdam, was a rubbermanufacturer and honorary consul for the Netherlands in St Petersburg until he (temporarily) settled on his estates in Finland because of the Russian revolution. The wealthy industrialist household of his parents participated actively in the musical life of St Petersburg. At their 'palace' they organised concerts with composer Anton Arensky and pianist and conductor Willem Mengelberg. At an early age Van der Pals met people like Gustav Mahler und Alexander Glazunov.

Van der Pals studied musicology at Leipzig University and worked as an orchestral conductor in Helsinki in 1921–1941. He was a music critic of Hufvudstadsbladet newspaper, too, in 1920–1939.

His oldest brother Leopold van Gilse van der Pals (1884–1966) was a composer and moved to Berlin and Switzerland where he worked primarily with Rudolf Steiner. His second brother Maximiliaan Hendrik van Gilse van der Pals (1885–1966) became agriculturalist on the Laakspohja estate near Lohja in Finland in which country Nicolaï also settled.

== Bibliography ==
- Nikolai van der Pals, N. A. Rimsky-Korssakow, Inaugural-Dissertation, Breitkopf & Härtel, Leipzig 1914, W. Bessel, Leipzig 1929, G. Olms, Hildesheim 1977 (Repr).
- Nikolai van der Pals, Tschaikowsky, Athenaion, Potsdam 1940.

== Sources ==
- Nederland's Patriciaat, 16e jaargang, 's Gravenhage 1926.
- Otavan Iso Musiikkitietosanakirja, Vol. 4, p. 539. Helsinki 1978. ISBN 951-1-04763-9
