= Robert Saitschick =

Swiss philosopher (1868-1965)

Robert Saitschick or Robert Saitschik (Russian: Рувим Маркович Зайчик; April 24, 1868, Mstsislau, Russian Empire – February 23, 1965, Horgen) was a Swiss philosopher.

He grew up in Warsaw, where his father Morduch Zaitchik became a merchant. After graduating from the 8th grade of the 5th Warsaw gymnasium he became a member of a revolutionary circle, which led to a legal action against him in 1887 over spreading of a revolutionary poem. He left Warsaw in late December of that year and moved to Vienna.

He was a professor at Swiss Federal Institute of Technology Zürich (1895–1914), Universität zu Köln (1914–1925).

== Literary works ==
- Dostojewski und Tolstoi, 1892
- Der Mensch und sein Ziel, 1914
- Von der innern Not unseres Zeitalters. Ein Ausblick auf Fausts künftigen Weg, 1917
- Die geistige Krisis der europäischen Menschheit, 1924
- Schicksal und Erlösung, 1927
- Schöpfer höchster Lebenswerte, 1945
- Der Staat und was mehr ist als er, 1946
- Bismarck und das Schicksal des deutschen Volkes. Zur Psychologie und Geschichte der deutschen Frage, München 1949.
