= Friedrich Lienhard =

German writer (1865–1929)

Friedrich Lienhard (4 October 1865 – 30 April 1929) was a German writer and nationalist ideologue.

== Life ==
Born in Rothbach near Haguenau in Alsace, Lienhard became the eldest son of the village schoolmaster Friedrich Lienhard. He was born in what was then the French Empire, but the area was incorporated into the new German Empire when he was about five.

His mother Elisabeth (née Gutbub) died in 1877. In addition to his brother Albert, who was one year younger and later became a pastor, Lienhard had five half-brothers and sisters from his father's second marriage. From 1874 to 1886, he attended the grammar schools in Bouxwiller and Schillersdorf. From 1884, Lienhard studied Protestant theology in the University of Strasbourg. He broke off this study after four semesters to study literature and history at the Humboldt University of Berlin. In 1885, Lienhard joined the Wingolf Connection Argentina to Strasbourg and in 1887 the Berliner Wingolf. After three semesters he also broke off his second degree course.

He then turned to writing. As an independent writer, he earned his living as a tutor in Lichterfelde near Berlin. From April 1893 until October 1894, he was chief editor of the anti-Semitic monthly Das zwanzigste Jahrhundert. Blätter für deutsche Art und Wohlfahrt.

In 1900, together with Adolf Bartels, he became editor of the magazine Deutsche Heimat, a medium for "literature and folklore", for a few months. It was an ideological platform for the protagonists of the folk-nationalist Heimatkunst movement. Bartels and Lienhard formed the centre of this movement, their common ideological references were the writings of Paul de Lagarde and August Julius Langbehn. Lienhard rejected the common biological and ethnic racial categories and developed his own racial theory. He hoped to achieve "imperial inspiration" through a close connection between Christianity and Germanity. The "solution of the Jewish question" and the prevention of "left-wing mob rule", which seemed urgent to him as well, he saw in the assumption of "leadership" by a "noble race of great souls" with the "qualities of goodness, warmth and love". This by no means excluded anti-Semitism. For example, this is what the völkisch oriented "Weihespiel" Ahasver on the Rhine stands for. Trauerspiel aus der Gegenwart (1914). As an Alsatian, he was one of those German-speaking authors "who excelled in claiming the respective region as 'German' in their works." (Kay Dohnke). Finalely, the literary scholar Andreas Schumann concludes that the historical value references in Lienhard's work combine "Germanic, antique and Christian elements into a German-national model" which was "racially charged" and claimed a "German cultural hegemony" in Europe. Lienhard's German studies can be classified as "war German studies". Lienhard was directly involved in war propaganda through various publications, such as

- the publication of the paper Schicksale einer Verschpeppten in Frankreich. Told by her herself and presented to the Kaiser. Together with Paul Kannengießer, a Francophobe secondary school teacher from Strasbourg, author of the book Leidensfahrten verschleppter Elsaß-Lothringer (1916).
- or by the mass brochure World War and Alsace-Lorraine (1916: 111. to 125. thousand), published in the series Schützengraben-Bücher für das deutsche Volk.

Lienhard undertook extensive travels throughout Europe, including Switzerland, Italy, Spain, Scotland and Scandinavia.

In 1908, he retired to the Thuringian Forest. At 50, he married his childhood friend, the former deaconess, in Strasbourg Marie Elisabeth Zentz. In order to be able to better spread his theories, he moved to Weimar, the seat of the Goethe-Gesellschaft, in 1916. There, he was soon appointed to the board of directors, but could not realise his plan to transform the society into an academy. In 1918, he was admitted to the "Akademie Gemeinnützige Wissenschaften zu Erfurt". From 1920 to 1928, he was editor of the formerly Protestant conservative, now völkisch cultural journal Der Türmer. Lienhard died in Eisenach in 1929 at the age of 63 and was buried at the local New Cemetery/Central Cemetery in a grave of honour of the city. At that time, he was almost forgotten. However, in view of his affinity to National Socialism, he was "like many conservatives ... honoured again after 1933"

== Resonance in National Socialism ==
Lienhard belongs to the forefront of National Socialism, as he represented folk-nationalistic views, but with his own character. Among other things, he wanted to combine Christianity with German nationality. As he died in 1929 at the age of 63, he was therefore not a National Socialist in the sense of the Third Reich. The "Führer" had not yet appeared, the victory of this movement, later called "takeover", had not yet been achieved. If he was brought to public attention with a piece of his Wartburg trilogy on the occasion of Martin Luther's 450th birthday in 1933, in Lübeck at least, it was because he had succeeded in sensitively honouring an outstanding German. The theatre performed the third part Luther at Wartburg Castle (1906) on 1 November 1933. This event was called a "festival". The festival speaker was the main pastor at the cathedral, representative of the German Christians, Dr. Helmuth Johnsen (1891–1947), who was already appointed regional bishop of Brunswick on 1 May 1934. Contrary to expectations, however, this play proves to be more of a religious intimate play, as it shows Luther, the Bible translator, isolated and struggling in (actual) protective custody, trying to make sure that the - for him distant - events in Wittenberg do not slip his mind (iconoclasts, enthusiasts). In this situation, there could be no great action for him. Accordingly, the Lübeck media were keen to reinterpret this work: They spoke of German revolutions and the will to live of great personalities. A good example of how the National Socialists took advantage of people, works and thoughts of others, tore them out of their context and bent them for a certain situation.

== Today's reception ==
A reception of Lienhard's works can hardly be established today. One exception is his admittance by the particularist Alsatian "Heimatbund" ("... mìr [dian] àlli Àktiona vun in dia Rìchtung vum elsassischa Partikularismus gehn, unterstetza ..."), to which the "Neues Elsaß-Lothringen-Verlag" is closely associated, and by the fraternal milieu.

== Nominations and awards ==
- Dr. phil. h. c. (Straßburg 1915)
- Dr. theol. h. c. (Münster)
- Professorship (by Thuringian state government)
- Honorary citizen of Weimar (1925)
- Honorary citizen of the University of Jena (1925)
- Honorary Senator of the German Writers' Association
- Honorary member of the German Shakespeare Society

== Publications ==
- Lieder eines Elsässers, 1888, 1895
- Naphtali. Drama, 1888
- Wasgaufahrten. Ein Zeitbuch, 1895
- Till Eulenspiegel, 1896
- Eulenspiegels Ausfahrt. Schelmenspiel, 1896
- Gottfried von Straßburg. Schauspiel, 1897, online
- Odilia. Legende, 1898
- Nordlandslieder von Fritz Lienhard, 1899
- Die Vorherrschaft Berlins, 1900, online
- Die Schildbürger. Ein Scherzlied vom Mai, 1900
- Burenlieder, 1900
- Münchhausen. Ein Lustspiel, 1900
- Der Fremde. Schelmenspiel, 1900
- König Arthur. Trauerspiel, 1900
- Helden. Bilder und Gestalten, 1900 (stark erweiterte Neuauflage 1908)
- Litteratur-Jugend von heute. Eine Fastenpredigt, 1901
- Neue Ideale. Gesammelte Aufsätze, 1901
- Deutsch-evangelische Volksschauspiele. Anregungen, 1901
- Gedichte. 1. Gesamtausgabe, 1902
- Wartburg-Trilogie, 1903–1906
- Heinrich von Ofterdingen, 1903
- Die heilige Elisabeth, 1904
- Luther auf der Wartburg, 1906
- Oberflächen-Kultur, 1904
- Wieland der Schmied. Dramatische Dichtung, 1905
- Wege nach Weimar. Beiträge zur Erneuerung des Idealismus, 1905, online Bd.1, Bd.2, Bd.3, Bd.4, Bd.5, Bd.6
- Der Pandurenstein und anderes, 1906
- Wesen und Würde der Dichtkunst, 1907
- Das klassische Weimar, 1909
- Oberlin. Roman aus der Revolutionszeit im Elsaß, 1910
- Aus dem Elsass des XVIII. Jahrhunderts, 1910
- Odysseus. Dramatische Dichtung, 1911* Lichtland. Neue Gedichte, 1912
- Der Spielmann. Roman aus der Gegenwart, 1913, online
- Parsifal und Zarathustra. Vortrag, 1914, online
- Ahasver am Rhein. Trauerspiel, 1914
- Heldentum und Liebe, 1915
- Friedrich der Große, 1917
- Deutsche Dichtung in ihren geschichtlichen Grundzügen, 1917
- Phidias. Schauspiel, 1918
- Jugendjahre. Erinnerungen von Friedrich Lienhard, 1918
- Westmark. Roman aus dem gegenwärtigen Elsaß, 1919
- Auf Goethes Pfaden in Weimar, 1919, 1940
- Von Weibes Wonne und Wert-Worte und Gedanken, ca. 1920
- Helden-Bilder und Gestalten, 1900
- Wasgenwald, 1921
- Aus Taulers Tagen. Erzählung, 1923
- Thüringer Tagebuch, 1903
- Ein deutsches Krippenspiel, 1925
- Das Gastgeschenk, 1925
- Der Sängerkrieg auf der Wartburg. Ein Festspiel, 1925
- Schwertweihespiel, 1927
- Das Landhaus bei Eisenach. Ein Burschenschaftsroman aus dem 19. Jahrhundert, 1928
