= Cello Concerto (Kraft) =

Work by Antonín Kraft

The Cello Concerto Nr. 1 in C Major (Op.4) is a cello concerto by Antonín Kraft.

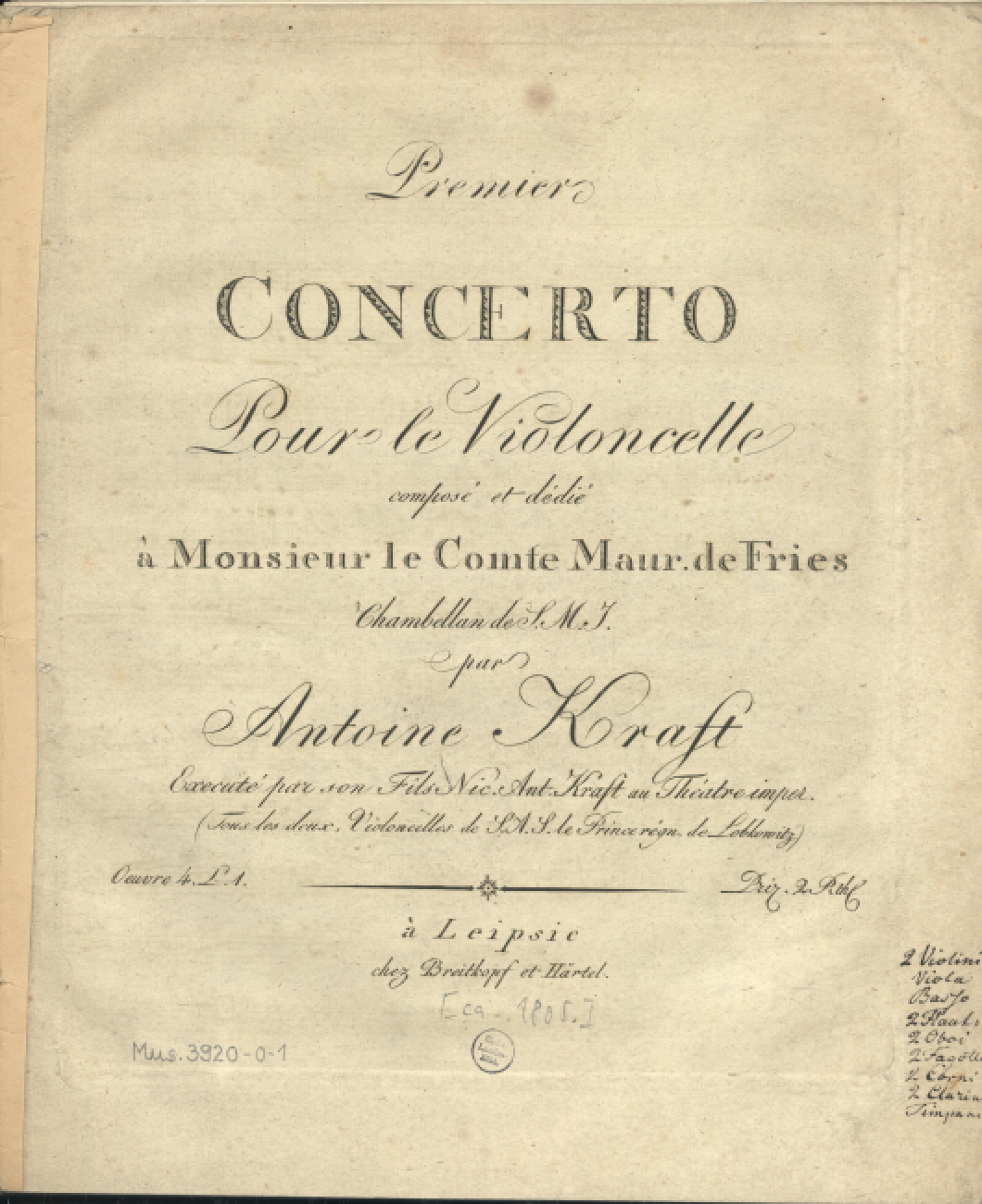
Cover of the first edition, 1805

The C Major Cello Concerto Nr. 1 was first published by Breitkopf & Härtel in Leipzig the year 1805.

The concerto bears the title Premier Concerto Pour le Violoncelle composé et dédié à Monsieur le Comte Maurce de Fries chambellan SMJ (Sa Majesté Imperiale) par Antoine Kraft Executé par son Fils Nicolaus Antoine Kraft au Théatre imperial (Tous les deux, Violoncelles de S.A.S. le Prince régnant de Lobkowitz Oeuvr. 4 L.1. Dir. 2. Rthl. à Leipsic chez Breitkopf et Härtel

The dedicatee of the Concerto is Moritz von Fries, who was the wealthiest man in the monarchy at that time, and through his personal contact and financing allowed its publication and performance. The concerto was regularly performed at the imperial Theatre in Vienna Burgtheater by his son Nikolaus Kraft (named after Prince Nikolaus Esterhazy). Both father Antonin Kraft and his son Nikolaus were principal cellists at the orchestra of Prince Joseph Franz von Lobkowitz and premiered several of Beethoven's symphonies, for instance the 3rd Symphony (also premiered in 1805) that starts with the theme on the cellos.

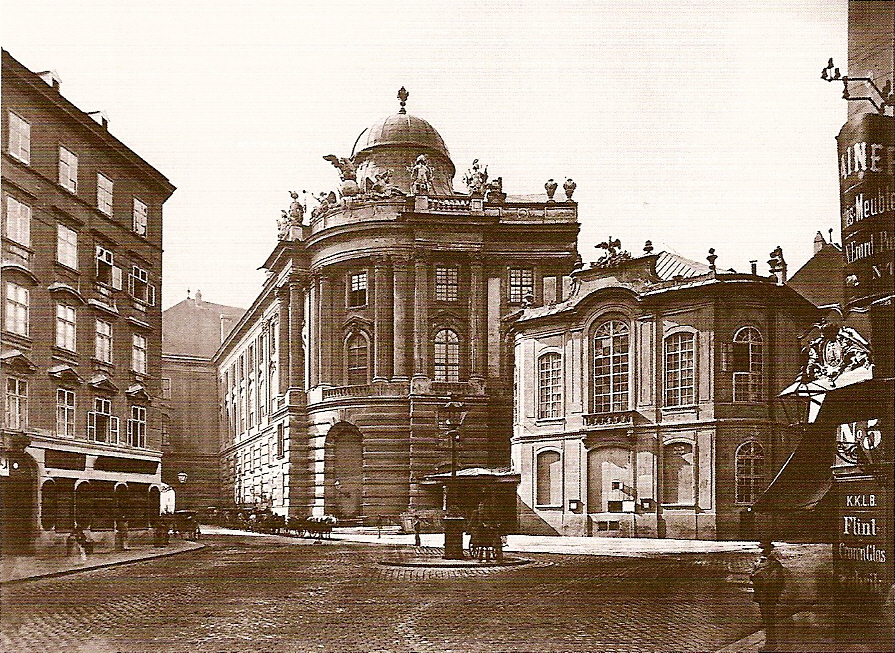
Old imperial theatre (Burgtheater), built in 1748 and destroyed at the end of the 19th century

The concerto was played on tour all over Europe, and was a much appreciated work at that time. The personal copy of Friedrich Grützmacher of the Concerto is to be found at the Sächsische Landesbibliothek. Grützmacher was a pupil of Bernhard Romberg who was himself a pupil of Franz Xaver Hammer (also called Marteau or sometimes Mardeau) and Antonin Kraft.

The second edition of the work was printed in 1961 in Prague by Státní hudební nakladatelství Praha (now editio Supraphon) SHV, 1961. Plate H 3296. This edition was heavily revised by Josef Chuchro.

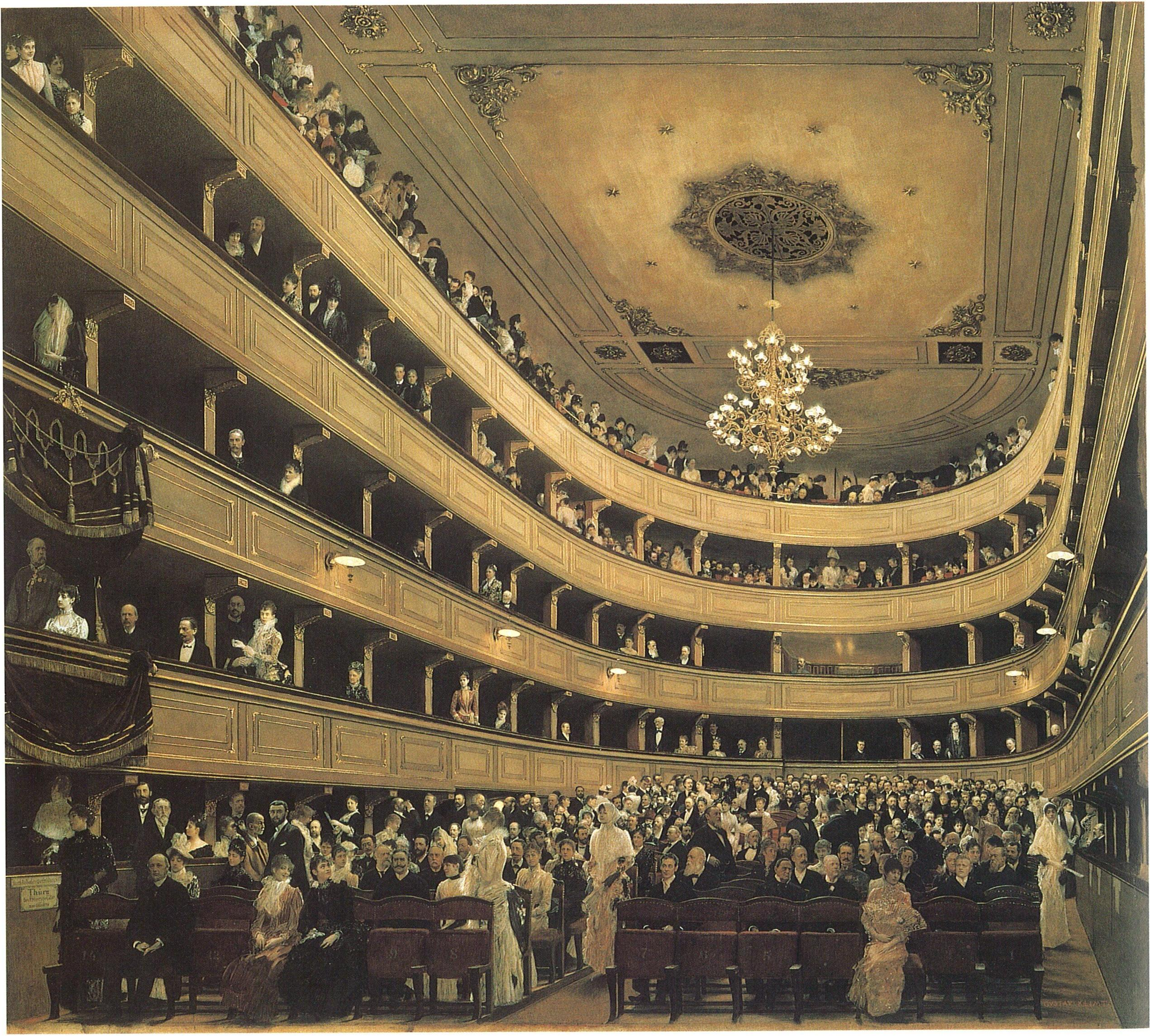
Inside of the old Burgtheater, painting by Gustav Klimt.

Kraft was principal cellist under Joseph Haydn in Prince Nikolaus Esterházy's orchestra from 1778 until 1790. Antonin Kraft along with his son Nikolaus joined the orchestra of Count Anton Grassalkovich in Bratislava in 1790 as first cellist. Kraft became a member of the Schuppanzigh Quartet founded in 1792 in the salon of Prince Karl Lichnowský, then from 1796 he was employed in Prince Lobkowicz's orchestra. The cello parts to Haydn's D major Cello Concerto and Beethoven's Triple Concerto, Op.56 were written to fit his technique. Haydn's D Major Cello Concerto was attributed to Kraft for almost a century.

Antonin Kraft was also a composition student of Haydn and played chamber music with all major musicians of that time, notably also the premiere of the Divertimento in E-flat major, K.563 by Mozart in Dresden on April 13, 1789 (follow up concerts in Leipzig and Berlin) with Anton Teyber taking the violin part, Mozart playing viola and himself playing cello. In 1792 Ludwig van Beethoven established permanent residence in Vienna, and he soon made the acquaintance of Kraft. Both artists were bound by a friendship that lasted until Kraft's death. He was also first cellist in the Vienna opera.

== Recordings ==
- Anner Bylsma, cello. With the Tafelmusic Orchestra. (Harmonia Mundi Label)
