= Cello Sonatas Nos. 4 and 5 (Beethoven) =

Set of sonatas by Ludwig van Beethoven

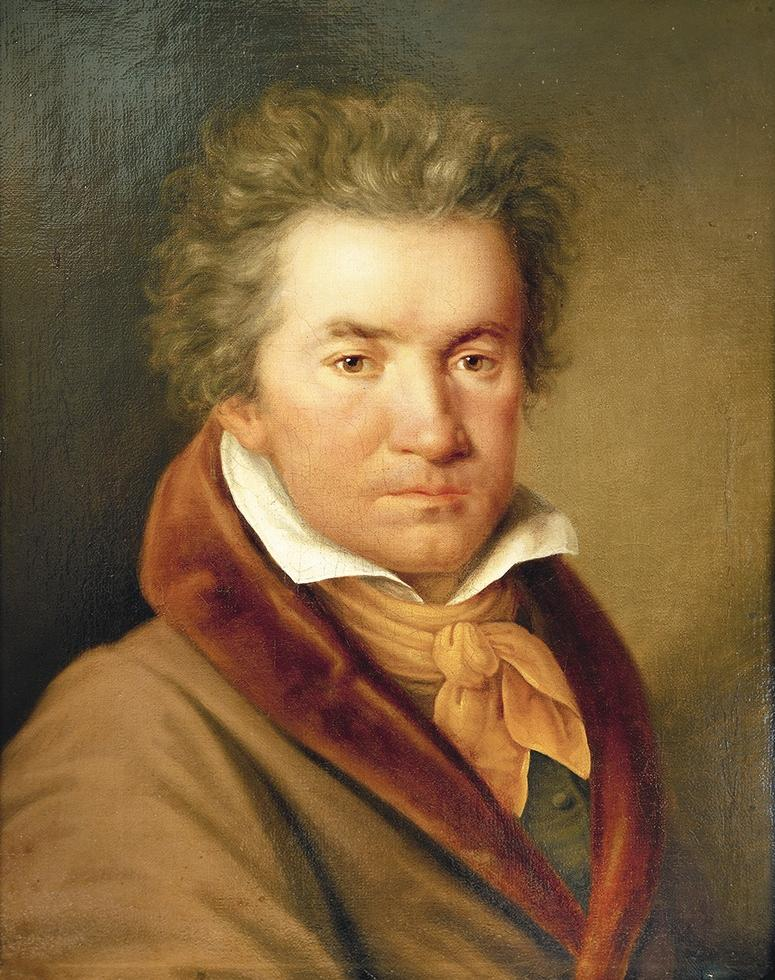
Beethoven in 1815; painted by Joseph Willibrord Mähler (1778–1860)

The Sonatas for cello and piano No. 4 in C major, Op. 102, No. 1, and No. 5 in D major, Op. 102, No. 2, by Ludwig van Beethoven were composed simultaneously in 1815 and published, by Simrock, in 1817 with a dedication to the Countess Marie von Erdődy, a close friend and confidante of Beethoven.

== History ==
The two sonatas were composed between May and December 1815. The first copy by Beethoven's copyist Wenzel Rampl was made in late 1815 but was then subject to further alterations by Beethoven. A subsequent ‘good’ copy was supplied in February 1816 to Charles Neate for proposed, though unrealized, publication in London. Beethoven then made further small alterations prior to their eventual publication by Simrock in Bonn.

During the period 1812 to 1817, Beethoven, ailing and overcome by all sorts of difficulties, experienced a period of literal and figurative silence as his deafness became overwhelmingly profound and his productivity diminished. Following seven years after the A major Sonata No. 3, the complexity of their composition and their visionary character marks (which they share with the subsequently completed piano sonata Op. 101) the start of Beethoven's "third period".

The critics of the time, often perplexed by Beethoven's last compositions, described the sonatas in terms such as the following from the Allgemeine musikalische Zeitung:

They elicit the most unexpected and unusual reactions, not only by their form but by the use of the piano as well…We have never been able to warm up to the two sonatas; but these compositions are perhaps a necessary link in the chain of Beethoven's works in order to lead us there where the steady hand of the maestro wanted to lead us.

Although played less often than Sonata No. 3, Sonatas Nos. 4 and 5 are now essential elements in the basic repertory of works for cello and piano.

== Structure ==
=== Sonata No. 4 in C major, Op. 102, No. 1 ===
Cello Sonata No. 4 in C major, Op. 102, No. 1
I. Andante – Allegro vivace

II. Adagio – Tempo d'andante – Allegro vivace
Live performance by John Michel (cello) and Lisa Bergman (piano)

This sonata consists of two movements:

1. Andante – Allegro vivace
2. Adagio – Tempo d'andante – Allegro vivace

This short, almost enigmatic work demonstrates in a concentrated form how Beethoven was ready to challenge and even subvert the sonata structures he inherited from composers such as Haydn and Mozart.

Its overall structure is very similar to the contemporary piano sonata Op. 101. Both movements recall the long-established convention of a slow introduction to a brisk main section in sonata form, but with significant modifications.

In the first movement, the introductory portion entirely lacks the portentousness of a conventional slow introduction, consisting of a brief elegiac theme repeated several times without change of key and largely unvaried; it concludes with an elaborate cadence in C major that is then contradicted by the sonata portion being in the relative minor, largely avoiding the key of C major except at the opening of the development.

The second movement opens more in the manner of a traditional slow introduction and eventually leads to a sonata-form portion in the 'correct' key of C. However, before this point is reached, the opening material of the sonata reappears for a final, almost ecstatic variation, a procedure paralleled elsewhere in Beethoven's work only in the drama of the fifth and ninth symphonies.

=== Sonata No. 5 in D major, Op. 102, No. 2 ===
This sonata consists of three movements:

1. Allegro con brio
2. Adagio con molto sentimento d'affetto – Attacca
3. Allegro – Allegro fugato

While this sonata is more accessible and conventionally structured, the concluding fugue prefigures the fugal finales of the Hammerklavier Sonata and the late string quartets.

== Notable recordings ==
In a plentiful discography, the interpretations by the Latvian cellist Mischa Maisky with the Argentine pianist Martha Argerich are highly regarded (DG 437514, 1993; this recording has been reissued by ArchivMusic).

The earlier performances of all five of Beethoven's cello sonatas by the Russian duo of cellist Mstislav Rostropovich and pianist Sviatoslav Richter remain standards of excellence (Philips Duo 442565, 1961–1963).

Pablo Casals, who became especially interested in chamber music and concertos for cello by the end of the 19th century, and performed many works that had by then become long-neglected, recorded at least two complete studio sets of the five Beethoven cello sonatas in addition to a number of recordings of individual sonatas, all highly influential in respect to subsequent interpretations. The first of these sets were recorded in the 1930s, with pianists Otto Schulhof (No. 3, recorded 1930) and with Mieczysław Horszowski (No. 4, in 1936, and Nos. 1, 2, and 5, in 1939). (EMI Classics 7243 5 65185). Twenty years later Casals and Horszowski made a live recording of Nos. 2 and 5, together with a transcription for cello of Beethoven's Op. 17 Horn Sonata, in 1958 (Philips 426105).

Casals' second complete studio set of the Beethoven sonatas was recorded with Rudolf Serkin at the 1951 Perpignan Festival (No. 2) and at the 1953 Prades Festival (Nos. 1, 3–5). (Sony Classical SM2K 58985).
