= Immortal Beloved (1994 film) =

- Theatrical release poster
- Directed by: Bernard Rose
- Written by: Bernard Rose
- Produced by: Stephen McEveety; Bruce Davey
- Starring: Gary Oldman; Jeroen Krabbé; Isabella Rossellini; Johanna ter Steege; Valeria Golino
- Cinematography: Peter Suschitzky
- Edited by: Dan Rae
- Production companies: Columbia Pictures; Icon Productions
- Distributed by: Entertainment Film Distributors (United Kingdom); Majestic Films International (International; via Icon Productions); Triumph Releasing Corporation (Select territories)
- Release date: December 16, 1994
- Running time: 121 minutes
- Countries: United Kingdom; United States
- Languages: English; Hungarian
- Box office: $9.9 million

Immortal Beloved is a 1994 biographical film written and directed by Bernard Rose and starring Gary Oldman, Jeroen Krabbé, Isabella Rossellini and Johanna ter Steege. The film narrates the life of composer Ludwig van Beethoven (played by Oldman) in flashbacks while it follows Beethoven's secretary and first biographer Anton Schindler's (Krabbé) quest to ascertain the true identity of the Unsterbliche Geliebte (Immortal Beloved) addressed in three letters found in the late composer's private papers. Schindler journeys throughout the Austrian Empire interviewing women who might be potential candidates, as well as through Beethoven's own tumultuous life.

== Plot ==
When Ludwig van Beethoven dies, his assistant and close friend Schindler deals with his last will and testament. It reads that his estate, music and affairs will be left to his "immortal beloved," but there remains a question as to who is Beethoven's "immortal beloved," an unnamed woman mentioned in one of his letters. Schindler embarks on a quest to find out and meets the women whom he had known played a part in Ludwig's life.

Schindler first meets with Giulietta Guicciardi, who had been a piano student of Beethoven's when she was a young, unmarried woman and had fallen in love with him. In flashback, we see that – despite Giulietta's father's disapproval – she intends to marry Beethoven, who has proposed to her. She attempts to gain her father's consent by proving that, despite rumors to the contrary, Beethoven can still play music, and hides with her father while the composer plays their new pianoforte, believing he is alone. When he discovers Giulietta and her father, he is furious, feeling betrayed. He cuts ties with her and storms out. She calls after him to apologize, and only then realizes that Beethoven is deaf.

Schindler next meets Anna-Marie Erdödy, who took Beethoven in after becoming outraged with the audience mocking him at a poor performance, as the composer, now completely deaf, had become unable to properly conduct the orchestra. Anna-Marie's young son is killed during Napoleon's attack on Vienna and Beethoven comforts her in her grief, leading to a love affair, but she denies being his "immortal beloved."

Schindler's investigation brings him back to Beethoven's own family, recounting his disapproval of his brother marrying Johanna Reiss, the daughter of Anton Van Reiss, a prosperous Viennese upholsterer, even attempting to have her arrested at one point. After his brother's death, Beethoven is able to seize custody of his nephew Karl. Even though the boy is indifferent to music, his uncle becomes obsessed with making him a composer, neglecting his own career, which suffers.

Karl grows into a teenager, having spent hours daily practicing the piano. Beethoven is convinced that Karl will be a great success as a composer, but Karl knows he has no talent and, pushed to his breaking point by his uncle, attempts suicide. He survives but tells Beethoven he never wants to see him again.

Schindler discovers that Beethoven's great love was Johanna, and that Karl, conceived before her marriage, is actually his son, not his nephew. They had intended to elope, but Beethoven was delayed and wrote the "immortal beloved" letter to Johanna to let her know. However, Johanna never received it and, believing Beethoven had abandoned her, left and married his brother instead. Both feeling betrayed, their love grew to hate. Johanna tells Schindler that when she saw the performance of his ninth symphony, she was moved to forgive him and ultimately made peace with him on his deathbed, where he gave her a signed letter, giving her custody over Karl.

Schindler gives Johanna the letter to the "Immortal Beloved" in which she finally reads what happened that night they were supposed to meet. Shocked to find out how an unfortunate event and misunderstanding has kept them apart, she visits Beethoven's grave.

== Cast ==
- Gary Oldman as Ludwig van Beethoven
- Jeroen Krabbé as Anton Felix Schindler
- Isabella Rossellini as Anna-Marie Erdödy
- Johanna ter Steege as Johanna Reiss
- Marco Hofschneider as Karl van Beethoven
- Miriam Margolyes as Nanette Streicherová
- Barry Humphries as Clemens Metternich
- Valeria Golino as Giulietta Guicciardi
- Gerard Horan as Nikolaus Johann van Beethoven
- Christopher Fulford as Kaspar van Beethoven
- Alexandra Pigg as Therese Obermayer
- Luigi Diberti as Franz Josef Guicciardi
- Michael Culkin as Jakob Hotscevar
- Donal Gibson as Karl Holz
- Geno Lechner as Josephine von Brunsvik
- Claudia Solti as Theresa von Brunsvik

== Historical background ==
After Beethoven's death in 1827, a three-part letter was found among his private papers addressed to a woman whom he called "immortal beloved". Written in the summer of 1812 from the spa town of Teplice, the letter has generated a great deal of speculation and debate among scholars and writers as to her identity. Among the candidates, then and now, are Giulietta Guicciardi, Thérèse von Brunsvik, Josephine Brunsvik, Antonie Brentano, and Anna-Marie Erdödy, some of whom are portrayed in the film.

The film's writer and director, Bernard Rose, though not a historian, claimed that he had successfully identified the addressed woman as Beethoven's sister-in-law Johanna (Reiss) van Beethoven, a claim no scholar on Beethoven has endorsed. The film also implies that Karl, Beethoven's nephew, was in reality the couple's son. Biographer Gail S. Altman disputed Rose's claim in a book devoted specifically to the question of the woman's identity and Beethoven's relationships in general.

== Music ==
- The Orchestra: London Symphony Orchestra, conducted by Georg Solti
- Instrumental soloists
  - Murray Perahia, piano
  - Gidon Kremer, violin
- Juilliard String Quartet

(in order of appearance)

- Symphony No. 5 in C minor, Op. 67. Allegro con brio
- Missa Solemnis: Kyrie
- Für Elise (complete)
- Symphony No. 3 in E-flat major Op. 55 Eroica
- Piano Sonata No. 14, Moonlight: Adagio Sostenuto
- Symphony No. 6, Op. 68 in F major, Pastoral: Storm
- Piano Trio No. 5 in D major, Op. 70, No. 1 Ghost
- Violin Concerto in D major, Op. 61
- Piano Sonata No. 8 in C minor, Pathetique
- The Thieving Magpie, by Rossini (doesn't appear on the CD)
- Missa solemnis in D major, Op. 123: Agnus Dei
- Symphony No. 9 in D minor, Op. 125: Allegro ma non troppo, un poco maestoso (first 2 minutes, doesn't appear on the CD)
- Piano Concerto No. 5 in E major, Emperor (love theme, ending credits)
- Symphony No. 7 in A major, Op. 92: Allegretto (Karl's theme)
- Violin Sonata in A major, Op. 47, Kreutzer: Adagio sostenuto- Presto
- Symphony No. 9, Op. 125: Ode to Joy
- String Quartet No. 13 in B-flat major, Op. 130
- Christus am Ölberg, Oratorio, Op. 85

== Reception ==
=== Critical response ===
Reviews for Immortal Beloved were mixed. On Rotten Tomatoes the film has an approval rating of 57% based on 56 reviews, with an average rating of 6.2/10. The site's consensus states: "A contrived romantic mystery and ponderous pacing make Immortal Beloved a not-so-joyful ode to Ludwig van Beethoven, despite Gary Oldman's best efforts to inject some passion into proceedings." Audiences surveyed by CinemaScore gave the film a grade A− on scale of A to F.

Emanuel Levy gave the film a "C" rating, calling it a "speculative chronicle" that lacks the "vibrant energy and charm" of Wolfgang Amadeus Mozart biopic Amadeus (1984). He praised the "wonderfully recorded and inventively used" Beethoven compositions as well as the casting of Oldman, who he felt was "the perfect actor to portray the arrogant, irascible musician". Roger Ebert was highly complimentary about the film. He gave it three and a half stars out of four, stating in his review: "Immortal Beloved has clearly been made by people who feel Beethoven directly in their hearts". He asserted that Oldman "at first seems an unlikely choice...then we see that he is right". Janet Maslin also offered a positive review, stating: "thanks to its hugely effective use of Beethoven's most thrilling, tumultuous music, this film exerts much the same hypnotic power". She praised the performance of Oldman, writing that "he captures Beethoven as a believably brilliant figure struggling with his deafness and other demons".

MSN Movies, in a 2011 publication, wrote: "Oldman's performance is unimpeachable. He dives deep into the role with powerful passion and makes the audience feel the pain of the genius as he loses his hearing and fails to shape his nephew into a similarly talented musician. In the year of '[Forrest] Gump', Oldman was overlooked for a well-deserved Oscar nomination." Also that year Josh Winning of Total Film named Oldman's portrayal of Beethoven as one of the five best performances of his career, saying: "Immersing himself fully into the role of the German composer, Oldman is here damn near unrecognisable. The fact that he remains silent for the first 20 minutes of the film while simultaneously emoting for England is a small triumph in itself."

=== Box office ===
The movie debuted strongly and was a modest success, generating $9,914,409 in a domestic-only release.

=== Year-end lists ===
- 5th – Steve Persall, St. Petersburg Times
- Top 10 (not ranked) – George Meyer, The Ledger

== See also ==
- List of films featuring the deaf and hard of hearing
