= Cello Sonata No. 3 (Beethoven) =

Composition for cello and piano by Ludwig van Beethoven

Cello Sonata
- No. 3
- by Ludwig van Beethoven
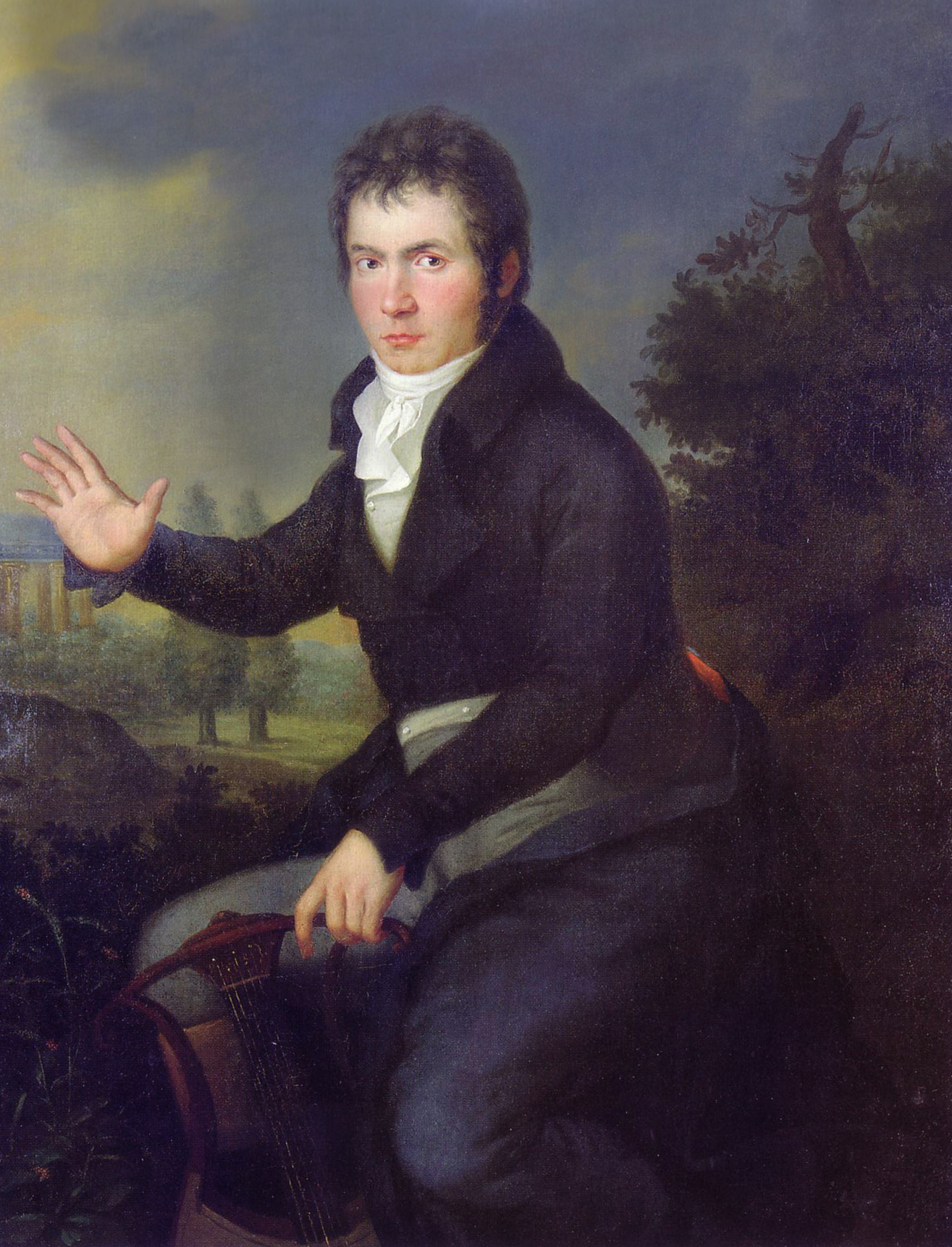
- 1804–05 Beethoven portrait by J. W. Mähler
- Opus: 69
- Period: Classical
- Composed: 1807–08
- Dedication: Ignaz von Gleichenstein
- Published: 1809
- Movements: Three

Premiere
- Date: 5 March 1809
- Location: Vienna
- Performers: Nikolaus Kraft; Dorothea von Ertmann

The Cello Sonata No. 3 in A major, Op. 69, is the third of five cello sonatas by Ludwig van Beethoven. He composed it in 1807–08, during his productive middle period. It was first performed in 1809 by cellist Nikolaus Kraft and pianist Dorothea von Ertmann, a student of Beethoven. Published by Breitkopf & Härtel the same year, it was dedicated to Freiherr Ignaz von Gleichenstein, Beethoven's friend and an amateur cellist. The sonata was successful with audiences from the beginning.

An early print of the composition titled it "Sonata / per il / Clavicembalo con Violoncello / composta / dal Sig=r / Luigi van Beethoven". Beethoven's two early sonatas were, as usual at the time, virtuoso concert pieces for the piano, with the string instrument playing a supporting role. The third sonata has been described as the first cello sonata to give the two instruments equal importance. A model for later compositions in the genre, it has been performed and recorded often, including versions with period instruments.

== History ==
Over the course of his life, Beethoven composed five cello sonatas, two of them early as his Op. 5. These two sonatas, composed when Beethoven was age 25, were highly virtuoso concert pieces showing off the pianist, with a cello part of less weight. Beethoven performed them with cellist Jean-Pierre Duport in Berlin in 1796, and dedicated them to Frederick William II of Prussia who was an amateur cellist himself.

Beethoven composed his third cello sonata in A major in Vienna during his middle period, a productive time when he also composed works such as the Piano Trios Op. 70, the Choral Fantasy, as well as his Fifth and Sixth Symphonies. It was a time when Beethoven faced increasing deafness. He had to end his career as a pianist with the concert on 22 December 1808 in which he premiered the two symphonies, the Choral Fantasy and other vocal and choral music, as well as his Fourth Piano Concerto. First sketches for the sonata appeared alongside those for the Fifth Symphony and the Violin Concerto in a sketchbook dated September 1807 to early in 1808. Beethoven's sketches show that he continuously revised passages, and further altered his first autograph manuscript, while the finished composition sounds like the result of spontaneous inspiration. He completed the composition in 1808.

Beethoven dedicated the sonata to Freiherr Ignaz von Gleichenstein, his friend and an amateur cellist, who also assisted the composer in financial matters. The previous year he had arranged an annuity for Beethoven from a group of sponsors which included Archduke Rudolf of Austria, a pupil of Beethoven. The composer had planned to dedicate his Fourth Piano Concerto to Gleichenstein, but felt that he had to honour the Archduke with the dedication instead, because he had shown particular interest in the Concerto. Beethoven explained to Gleichenstein his regret but announced: "... another work is appearing in which you will be given what is due to your – and our friendship".

The sonata was first performed on 5 March 1809 as part of a benefit concert for the cellist Nikolaus Kraft, who performed it with pianist Dorothea von Ertmann, a student of Beethoven. Kraft, known for "technical mastery" and a "clear, rich tone", was the cellist for whom Beethoven had written his Triple Concerto, published in 1804, and Beethoven's first work to use advanced cello techniques. A performance of the cello sonata in 1816 was played by Joseph Linke, the cellist in the Razumovsky Quartet, and Carl Czerny. The pianist wrote in metronome markings, regarded as approved by the composer, and noted that a slight rubato playing would increase interest and expressiveness.

Breitkopf & Härtel published the cello sonata first in Leipzig. The first edition had many mistakes, including the opus number misprinted as 59. Beethoven was annoyed, but the mistakes could be corrected only in a later edition. The work appeared the same year also printed by Artaria, entitled "Sonata / per il / Clavicembalo con Violoncello / composta / dal Sig=r / Luigi van Beethoven". A critical edition was published in 1971 by Henle Verlag, edited by Bernard van der Linde, based on the edition of Beethoven's complete works by the Beethoven Archive the same year. These editions relied on the earlier prints, the autograph manuscript even if regarded as still a work in progress, as well as the correspondence of Beethoven and his first publisher regarding errors.

The sonata is formally the most expansive of Beethoven's cello sonatas, but also the most melodic one, and was successful with audiences from the beginning. A performance takes about 25 minutes. Violinist Mark Kaplan noted: "In general, the writing in op. 69 is thinner than in the early cello sonatas ... greater compositional technique allowed Beethoven the possibility of using fewer notes with confidence." Cellist Steven Isserlis described the work as the first cello sonata in history to give the two instruments equal importance. It has remained a model in the genre, for works by Mendelssohn, Brahms, Debussy and Shostakovich.

== Structure and music ==
Cello Sonata in A major, Op. 69
I. Allegro ma non tant

II. Scherzo. Allegro molto

III. Adagio cantabile – Allegro vivace
Live performance by John Michel (cello) & Lisa Bergman (piano)

The sonata is structured in three movements, with an 18-bar slow introduction to the third movement:

1. Allegro ma non tanto
2. Scherzo. Allegro molto (in A minor)
3. Adagio cantabile – Allegro vivace

Beethoven noted on the autograph manuscript "Inter lacrymas et luctus" (Amid tears and sorrows). However, the work's character has been described as "positive in attitude", and "radiating serenity, humour and joy", similar in mood to some works by Franz Schubert. The sonata is a classical work with measured proportions and elements of symmetry. Throughout the composition, the two instruments are treated as equal partners, not as solo and accompaniment as in the early cello sonatas.

=== I. Allegro ma non tanto ===
The first movement is in alla breve time and marked Allegro ma non tanto (fast but not too much). It is written in sonata form, and opens with an expansive melody introduced by the cello alone.

Beethoven similarly featured a solo string instrument in some of his violin sonatas. The piano then enters with a cadenza-like flourish, which leads into a repetition of the opening theme played in octaves by the piano. The melody consists of several motifs to be used as material for further development. A bridge passage follows, leading to a second subject played, as John Mangum noted, in "organic relationship" with "the cello and piano interweaving, each gently decorating and elaborating the other's part". The development gives greater emphasis to the first theme. In the recapitulation, the cello is accompanied by running triplets on the piano.

One of the motifs is similar to the first motif in Bach's aria "Es ist vollbracht" (All is fulfilled) from his St John Passion, introduced there by the viol. It is unclear if the similarity is intended, but would match the inscription "inter lacrymas". The movement has moments of stillness and introspection both before the recapitulation and before the "final flourish".

=== II. Allegro molto ===
As in some of Beethoven's piano sonatas, there is no slow movement. The second movement is a scherzo in the tonic minor, A minor, with a contrasting trio in A major; the scherzo is played three times, alternating with the trio played twice. The scherzo makes prominent use of off-beat accents, in "rhythmic sharpness and thematic brevity". The trio's character was described by a reviewer as "gruff humour".

=== III. Adagio cantabile – Allegro vivace ===
The finale begins with a slow introduction in 2/4 time, marked Adagio cantabile (slow and singing), in the dominant key, E major. A slow introduction also appears in other Beethoven works of the period, such as the Waldstein Sonata. Here, it "creates a wholly individual atmosphere, one that is broadly lyrical and tinged with a sort of dignified sorrow", as Mangum noted. The short section has been described as sublime and "emotionally charged".

The finale, in alla breve time and marked Allegro vivace (fast and lively) is again in sonata form. The cello plays both the first subject and a contrasting second subject. The first subject dominates the development. The finale ends with an expressive coda. The movement has been described as contrasting episodes of "bravura" and others of "gentle repose", ending in a "joyous conclusion".

Cellist Jan Vogler summarised that the sonata "is an aristocratic, temperamental piece, full of musical expression and imagination. Its form is perfect, and it shows Beethoven's great taste."

== Recordings ==
The sonata has been recorded often, especially in sets of all cello sonatas by Beethoven, or all his music for cello and piano which also includes several sets of variations. Pablo Casals recorded the five cello sonatas in the 1930s, the Third with pianist Otto Schulhoff. In 1950, the sonata was recorded, together with the second by Maurice Gendron and composer Jean Françaix as the pianist. A recording of all cello sonatas was made by Mstislav Rostropovich and Sviatoslav Richter in 1963, which has been regarded as one of the greatest collaborations ever. Pierre Fournier and Wilhelm Kempff recorded the works in 1965, followed by Casals and Mieczysław Horszowski, Jacqueline du Pré and Daniel Barenboim, Yo-yo Ma and Emanuel Ax, Jean-Guihen Queyras and Alexander Melnikov, Daniel Müller-Schott and Angela Hewitt, and Mischa Maisky and Martha Argerich.

The five sonatas were recorded in 2014 by cellist Maja Weber and pianist Per Lundberg. Steven Isserlis and the musicologist Robert Levin played the sonatas on historic instruments, with forte-piano instead of a modern concert grand, to ensure the balance of sound Beethoven had in mind. They used a new critical edition by the musicologist Jonathan Del Mar. Jacqueline du Pré also made an earlier, critically well-received version with Stephen Kovacevich.
