= Ignaz von Gleichenstein =

German aristocrat and amateur cellist

Ignaz von Gleichenstein - lithograph by Ludwig Ferdinand Schnorr von Carolsfeld.

Baron Ignaz von Gleichenstein (24 May 1778 – 3 August 1828) was a German aristocrat and amateur cellist. He became a close friend of Ludwig van Beethoven, as well as being one of his most ardent supporters. Alongside Countess Marie Erdödy, Gleichenstein played a role in securing Beethoven a lifetime annuity from members of the Austrian high nobility.

== Life and association with Beethoven ==
Born on 24 May 1778, in Staufen im Breisgau, Ignaz von Gleichenstein was a son of the jurist Carl Benedict Freiherr Gleichauf von Gleichenstein (1725-1813), who worked as a senior official in Staufen and Freiburg. From 1794 to 1798, Ignaz studied law at the University of Freiburg before settling in Vienna in August 1800. In November 1801, he secured a position at the royal and imperial Hofkriegsrat as a planner and consultant (Konzipist, for which there is no direct translation). His colleagues there included Beethoven's friend Stephan von Breuning. In 1807 Ignaz met Beethoven, becoming one of the very few friends of the composer with whom Beethoven used the du familiar form of address.

Having taken over the role of amanuensis from Ferdinand Ries, who left Vienna in 1805, Gleichenstein placed his witnessing signature beside Beethoven's on a publishing contract with Muzio Clementi on 20 April 1807: for 200 pounds sterling, Clementi acquired exclusive rights to several works by the composer over the whole of Britain's sovereign territory, receiving the three "Razumovsky" Quartets op. 59, the Fourth Symphony op. 60, the Coriolan Overture op. 62, the Violin Concerto op. 61 and its arrangement as a Piano Concerto, as well as the Fourth Piano Concerto op. 58.

Two years later, Gleichenstein played a significant role in helping to sway members of the Imperial nobility to granting Beethoven a lifelong annuity in an effort to induce him to remain in Austrian lands in the face of an offer of employment as Kapellmeister in Cassel, from Jerome, King of Westphalia. Jan Swafford characterizes Beethoven's real intentions thus:

But by now he knew he would probably not go to Cassel, if he ever actually wanted to in the first place. Instead, he was busily involved in plans to secure a permanent annuity from a collection of Viennese patrons. The idea, and the outline of the agreement, had originated with Beethoven himself and had been promoted by Baron Gleichenstein and Countess Erdödy. Its gist was that in return for staying in Vienna, Beethoven asked to receive a yearly sum simply for plying his trade as he saw fit. The amount he hoped to receive was roughly the same as he had been offered in Cassel.

"The Countess Erdödy is of the opinion that you ought to outline a plan with her," wrote Beethoven to Gleichenstein early in 1809, "according to which she might negotiate in case they approach her, which she is convinced they will... If you should have time this afternoon, the Countess would be glad to see you." Negotiations resulted in Beethoven signing a contract with princes Lobkowitz, Kinsky and the Archduke Rudolf (in which they promised to pay him a regular stipend for life), his rejection of the Cassel post, and his remaining in Vienna until his death in 1827. Gleichenstein stood as guarantor for Beethoven on the agreement.

Evidence of the close relationship that formed between Beethoven and Gleichenstein is the dedication to Ignaz of the Sonata in A major op. 69 for violoncello and piano, completed in 1808. As reported by Julius Schneller, a friend of the family, Beethoven furnished the first edition copy intended for Gleichenstein with the inscription: "Inter Lacrimas et Luctum" (Between tears and grief).

== Marriage ==
Through Gleichenstein, Beethoven became associated with Therese Malfatti. In 1809, the baron, having regularly frequented the Malfatti family home, married Therese's sister Anna Malfatti (1792-1869) on 28 May 1811. The newly-wed couple moved to Freiburg and Oberrotweil in the summer of the same year to take over and oversee the administration of the von Gleichenstein family winery. Both returned to Vienna frequently. At the beginning of 1827, Ignaz von Gleichenstein again made the journey to Vienna to visit Beethoven on his final sickbed, latterly seeking advice from Beethoven's longtime doctor Johann Malfatti.

Gleichenstein possessed a replica of the second Beethoven portrait by Joseph Willibrord Mähler from 1815.

Between 1819 and 1823, he became active in politics, with a mandate in the Second Chamber of the Diet of the Grand Duchy of Baden.

On 3 August 1828, Ignaz von Gleichenstein died in the village of Heiligenstadt, north of Vienna, having been attended by Beethoven's own physician, Johann Malfatti.

== Family ==
Ignaz and Anna von Gleichenstein had four children:

- Mathilde (November 26, 1812, in Vienna – January 7, 1907, in Oberrotweil),
- Anna (June 26, 1814, in Freiburg – August 28, 1909, in Oberrotweil),
- Arthur (1817–1828),
- Hermann (1822–1859).

A descendant of Mathilde was the lawyer Viktor Huber von Gleichenstein (1909–1994).
