= Antonín Kraft =

Czech composer and cellist (1749–1820)

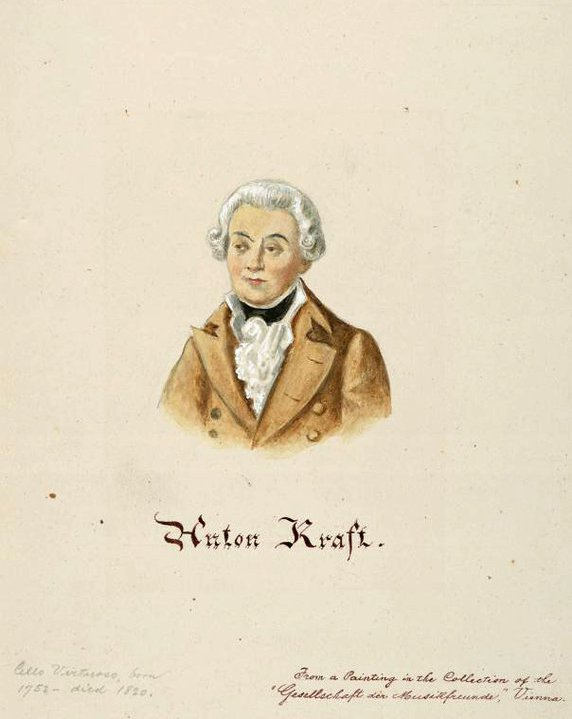
- Portrait of Antonín Kraft
- Born: 30 December 1749; Rokycany
- Died: 28 August 1820 (aged 70)
- Occupations: Composer; cellist

Antonín Kraft (30 December 1749 – 28 August 1820) was a Czech cellist and composer. He was a close friend of Haydn, Mozart, and Beethoven. He worked in the Holy Roman Empire and later in the Austrian Empire.

== Biography ==
Kraft was born on 30 December 1749 in the Bohemian town of Rokycany of a German Bohemian ethnic family which had assimilated into Czech. He received early musical education on the cello from his father before going to university in Vienna to study law. He soon obtained a position in the Imperial Hofkapelle. In 1778, he was appointed cellist in Prince Nikolaus Esterházy's orchestra, where he met and studied composition with Haydn. In 1789, he met Mozart in Dresden and took part in the premiere of his divertimento for string trio in E-Flat. Mozart played the viola part and Anton Teyber played the violin part. After Esterházy died in 1790, his successor, Prince Anton Esterházy, dismissed most of the court orchestra. Kraft went to Vienna and became a founding member of the Schuppanzigh Quartet, where he helped establish the traditions of string quartet playing. He played in the Grassalkovich court and from 1796 was employed in the orchestra of Prince Joseph Franz von Lobkowitz. He died on 28 August 1820 in Vienna.

Kraft was considered one of the greatest cellists of his time and both Haydn's Cello Concerto No. 2 in D, the cello part in Mozart's divertimento for string trio in E-Flat and the cello part in Beethoven's Triple Concerto were written for him, though his son Nikolaus Kraft is also claimed to have played the premiere of the latter.

As a composer, he wrote cello sonatas (six for cello with bass published as Op. 1 and 2) and a cello concerto (Op. 4). He also wrote various duos: for violin and cello (Op. 3), for cello and double bass and for two cellos (Op. 5 and 6).

== Works ==
- Op.1: 3 Cello Sonatas in C, G, D
- Op.2: 3 Cello Sonatas in B♭, G, C
- Op.3: 3 Grand Duos for Violin and Cello
- Op.4: Cello Concerto in C major
- Op.5: Cello Duo in G minor
- Op.6: Cello Duo in D major
- Op.7: Cello Duet on the theme from Mozart's Opera The Magic Flute ('Duettino Tamina and Papageno')
- Duets for Cello and Guitar
- Cello Concerto in C major "Seydel's Concerto"
