= Dorothea von Ertmann =

German pianist (1781–1849)

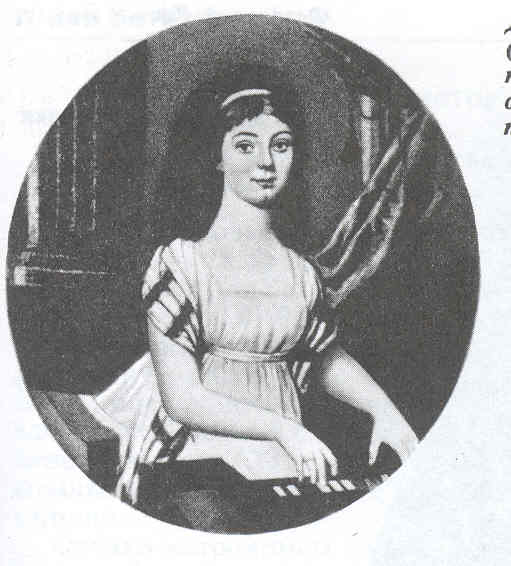

Dorothea von Ertmann (born Dorothea Graumann; 3 May 1781 – 16 March 1849) was a German pianist.

== Biography ==
Dorothea Graumann was born in Frankfurt and married Stephan von Ertmann, an Austrian infantry officer, in 1798. The couple moved to Vienna, where Dorothea Ertmann began taking lessons with Ludwig van Beethoven; he called her his "Dorothea-Cecilia". He dedicated his Piano Sonata No. 28 (in A major, Op. 101, composed in 1816) to her, and she may also have been the intended recipient of his Immortal Beloved letters. Her only child, Franz Carl, died at a young age in March 1804. While she was in mourning, Beethoven invited her to his home and improvised on the piano for her for an hour in order to comfort her, saying "We will now talk to each other in tones". Ertmann premiered his Cello Sonata No. 3 on 5 March 1809 with Nikolaus Kraft. She and her husband moved to Milan in 1820, where she was visited by Felix Mendelssohn in 1831, but after her husband's death in 1835 she returned to Vienna where she died.

Ertmann gave a number of public concerts and was most noted for her performance of Beethoven's compositions: Alexander Wheelock Thayer said that "all contemporary authorities agree, [she was] if not the greatest player of these works at least the greatest of her sex". Anton Schindler suggested that "she grasped intuitively even the most hidden subtleties of Beethoven's works with as much certainty as if they had been written out before her eyes". He also said that "without Frau von Ertmann, Beethoven's music would have disappeared even sooner from the repertory" because she created a musical salon dedicated to preserving his style against the rise of newer, more "fashionable" composers.

The German opera singer and teacher Mathilde Marchesi, née Graumann, was her niece.
