= Ludwig Ferdinand Schnorr von Carolsfeld =

German painter, engraver and lithographer

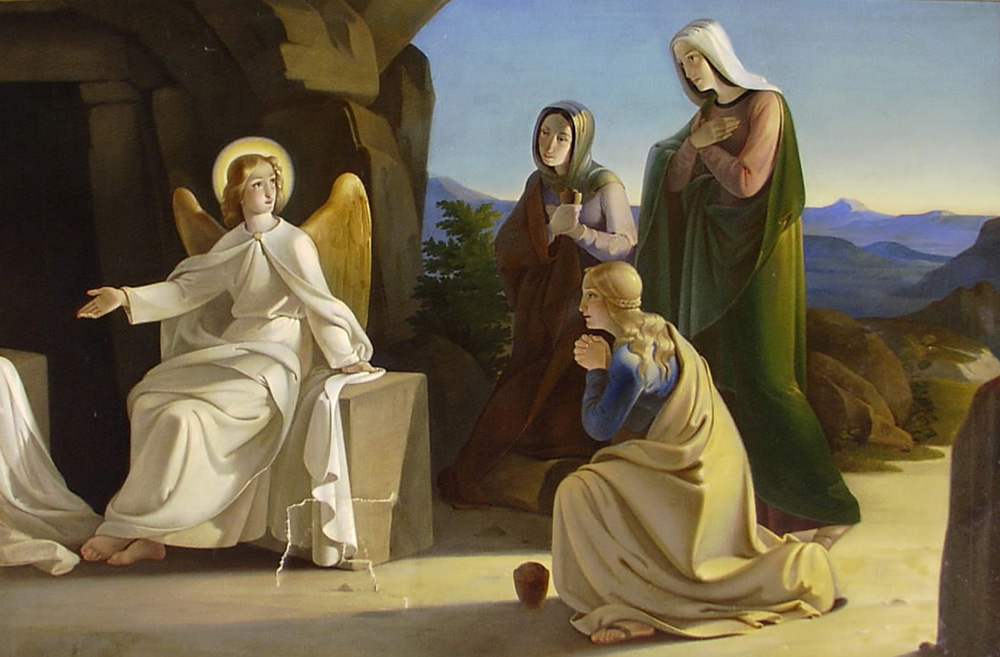
The Three Maries at the Grave of Jesus, about 1835

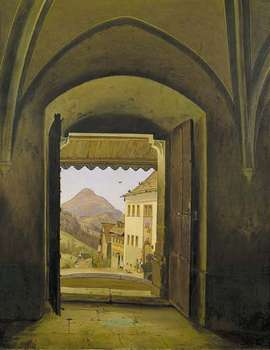
View from the Church in Annaberg over the Ötscher, 1842, Von der Heydt Museum

Ludwig Ferdinand Schnorr von Carolsfeld (11 October 1788 – 13 April 1853) was a German Romantic painter, engraver and lithographer.

Schnorr von Carolsfeld was born in Königsberg, the son and pupil of the artist Veit Hanns Schnorr von Carolsfeld. His younger brother was Julius Schnorr von Carolsfeld and his nephew was the opera singer Ludwig Schnorr von Carolsfeld.

At the age of 16 he moved to Vienna, where he lived for the rest of his life.

In 1804 he was registered as a student in the Academy of Fine Arts in Vienna under Heinrich Friedrich Füger, who had become acquainted with his father in 1801. He became part of the group of Academy students around Friedrich Overbeck, who were looking for new paths beyond the strongly formal Classical ideals of the Academy. The outcome of their efforts was the Nazarene movement. Unlike Overbeck and others, however, Schnorr von Carolsfeld avoided a complete break with the Academy, did not join the Lukasbund (a group founded by the other Nazarene artists), and remained in Vienna. His first patron was Duke Albert von Sachsen-Teschen. Schnorr von Carolsfeld maintained close relations with the Catholic Romantics Zacharias Werner and Friedrich von Schlegel.

In about 1808 he formed part of the circle of friends centred on Johann Baptist Malfatti von Monteregio and drew portraits of Ludwig van Beethoven and his friend Ignaz von Gleichenstein.

On 23 September 1812 in Vienna he married Karoline von Jankwitz, born in Silesia. In 1818 his bid to obtain the directorship of the Vienna Academy failed because of the opposition of Prince Metternich, the curator of the Academy, who mistrusted Schnorr von Carolsfeld because of his artistic and personal closeness to the artists of the Lukas group. He did however obtain a position from Archduke John of Austria, and provided the artworks for Brandhof, the Archduke's refurbished country house, up to 1828. In 1821 he became the teacher of Moritz von Schwind. In the same year he converted to Roman Catholicism.

Schnorr von Carolsfeld undertook study trips to Southern Germany, Switzerland and Paris (1834), and to Northern Germany (1837). Thanks to the Archduke he came into contact with the Austro-Hungarian Imperial family, who gave him commissions. In 1835, thanks again to the Archduke, and also thanks to the fact that Romantic painting was beginning to become popular throughout Germany, he became after all a member of the Academy in Vienna. From 1841 he was the curator of the Imperial gallery in the Belvedere Palace.

He died in Vienna in 1853.

In 1937 the "Schnorrgasse", a street in Floridsdorf in the 21st district of Vienna, was named in honour of him and his brother Julius.

== Literature ==
- Ludwig Ferdinand Schnorr von Carolsfeld. Biographisches Lexikon des Kaiserthums Oesterreich 1876
- Ulrich Thieme, Felix Becker u. a.: Allgemeines Lexikon der Bildenden Künstler von der Antike bis zur Gegenwart. Band 30, E. A. Seemann, Leipzig 1936, p. 208 f..
- Franz Schnorr von Carolsfeld (1891). "Schnorr von Carolsfeld, Ludwig" . Allgemeine Deutsche Biographie (in German). Vol. 32. Leipzig: Duncker & Humblot. pp. 189–190.
- Alexander Strasoldo-Graffemberg: Ludwig Ferdinand Schnorr von Carolsfeld (1788–1853). Albert-Ludwigs-Universität, Freiburg (Breisgau) 1986, (Dissertation).
- Ludwig Ferdinand Schnorr von Carolsfeld in: Ulrich Thieme, Felix Becker u. a.: Allgemeines Lexikon der Bildenden Künstler von der Antike bis zur Gegenwart. Band 30, E. A. Seemann, Leipzig 1936, p. 208 f..
