= Anna Maria Erdődy =

Hungarian noblewoman and friend of Beethoven

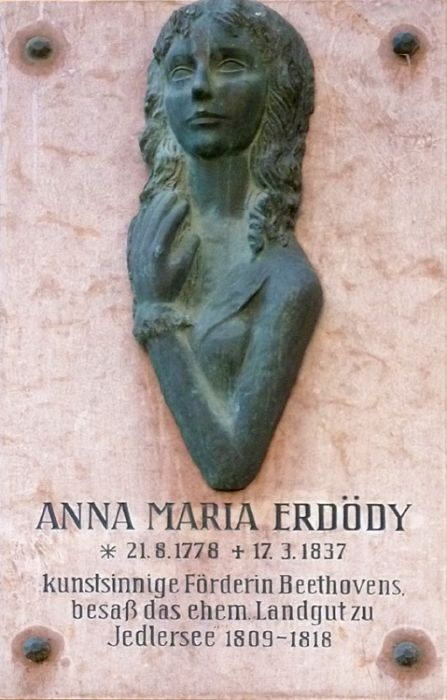
Marie Erdődy as remembered by a plaque at her estate in Jedlesee for her residence and patronage there during Beethoven's lifetime.

Countess Anna Maria (Marie) von Erdődy (21 August 1778 – 17 March 1837) was a Hungarian noblewoman and among the closest confidantes and friends of Ludwig van Beethoven. Dedicatee of four of the composer's late chamber works, she was instrumental in securing Beethoven an annuity from members of the Austrian high nobility.

== Life ==
She was born Countess von Niczky in Arad, then part of the Kingdom of Hungary, today Romania. On 6 June 1796 she married Count Péter Erdődy of Monyorokerék and Monte Claudio, scion of the noted Erdődy line of the Hungarian/Croatian aristocracy. They had two daughters and a son: Marie, Friederike, and August, affectionately known as Mimi, Fritzi, and Gusti. On 3 May 1798 Anna Maria was honoured by induction into the imperial Order of the Starry Cross. In 1805 she became estranged from Count Péter through desertion and eventually settled into a ménage with Johann Xaver Brauchle (1783–1838), her long-serving secretary and children's music teacher, who later became a composer. From 1815 she lived in Paucovec in Croatia, subsequently in Padua. In December 1823 she was expelled from the Austrian Empire for political outspokenness and moved to Munich, where she lived the rest of her life.

== Association with Beethoven ==
Marie Erdődy became one of the great supporters of Beethoven from the early years of the 19th century. She was often in his company and they became friends and confidants, Beethoven referring to Marie as his "father confessor". Their association can be dated from as early as 1802, the year of the Heiligenstadt Testament, during which difficult time Beethoven made frequent visits to Jedlesee—one mile from Heiligenstadt and five miles north of Vienna—where Marie had inherited the small country estate which today houses the Vienna-Floridsdorf Beethoven Memorial. Thayer writes, "It is not at all improbable that the vicinity of the Erdödy estate at Jedlesee am Marchfeld was one reason for his frequent choice of summer lodgings in the villages on the Danube, north of the city". In October 1808, Beethoven left the Pasqualati House, where he had lived for four years, and moved one block down into the Countess's large apartment on the Krugerstraße, No. 1074, residing there with Marie until March 1809.

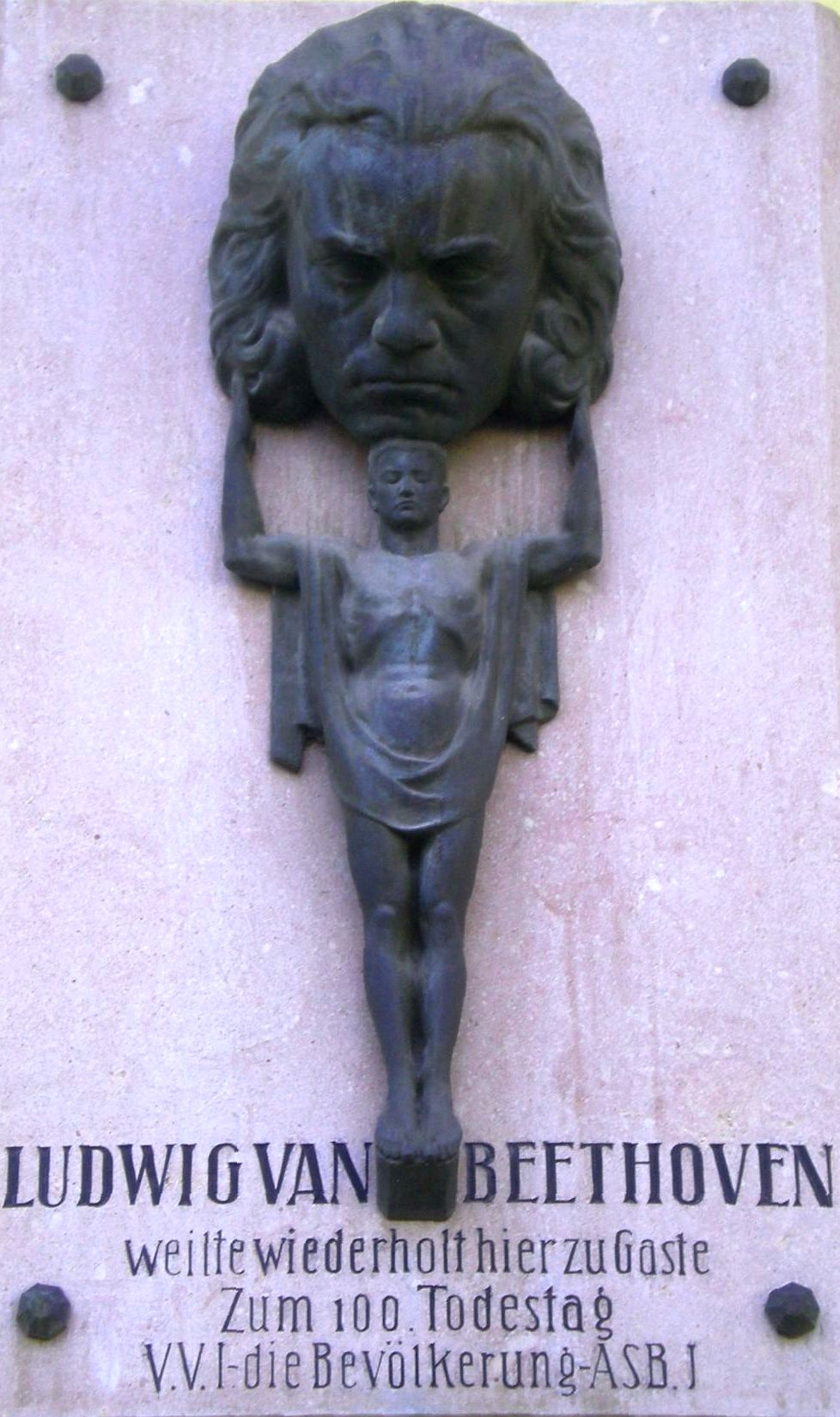
Beethoven plaque, Erdödy estate, Jedlesee, Floridsdorf-Vienna, citing Beethoven's repeated sojourns there as a guest.

Marie was instrumental in helping to sway members of the Imperial nobility to granting Beethoven a lifelong annuity in an effort to induce him to remain in Austrian lands in the face of an offer of employment as Kapellmeister in Cassel, from Jérôme, King of Westphalia. Jan Swafford characterizes Beethoven's real intentions thus:

But by now he knew he would probably not go to Cassel, if he ever actually wanted to in the first place. Instead, he was busily involved in plans to secure a permanent annuity from a collection of Viennese patrons. The idea, and the outline of the agreement, had originated with Beethoven himself and had been promoted by Baron Gleichenstein and Countess Erdödy. Its gist was that in return for staying in Vienna, Beethoven asked to receive a yearly sum simply for plying his trade as he saw fit. The amount he hoped to receive was roughly the same as he had been offered in Cassel.

Thayer states, "It seems likely that the suggestion that formal stipulations for a contract be drawn up under which Beethoven would decline the offer from Cassel and remain in Vienna came from the Countess Erdödy." "The Countess Erdödy is of the opinion that you ought to outline a plan with her," wrote Beethoven to Gleichenstein early in 1809, "according to which she might negotiate in case they approach her, which she is convinced they will... If you should have time this afternoon, the Countess would be glad to see you." Negotiations resulted in Beethoven signing a contract with princes Lobkowitz, Kinsky and the Archduke Rudolf (in which they promised to pay him a regular stipend for life), his rejection of the Cassel post, and his remaining in Vienna until his death in 1827.

In gratitude for these services and her hospitality in the years 1808 through 1809, Beethoven dedicated to Marie Erdődy the two piano trios opus 70, composed during Beethoven's extended stay with her, and later the pair of cello sonatas opus 102, written for the cellist Joseph Linke (who, along with Brauchle, became a tutor to Marie's children), and the canon Glück zum neuen Jahr (Happy New Year), WoO 176, of 1819.

=== Beethoven's "Immortal Beloved"? ===
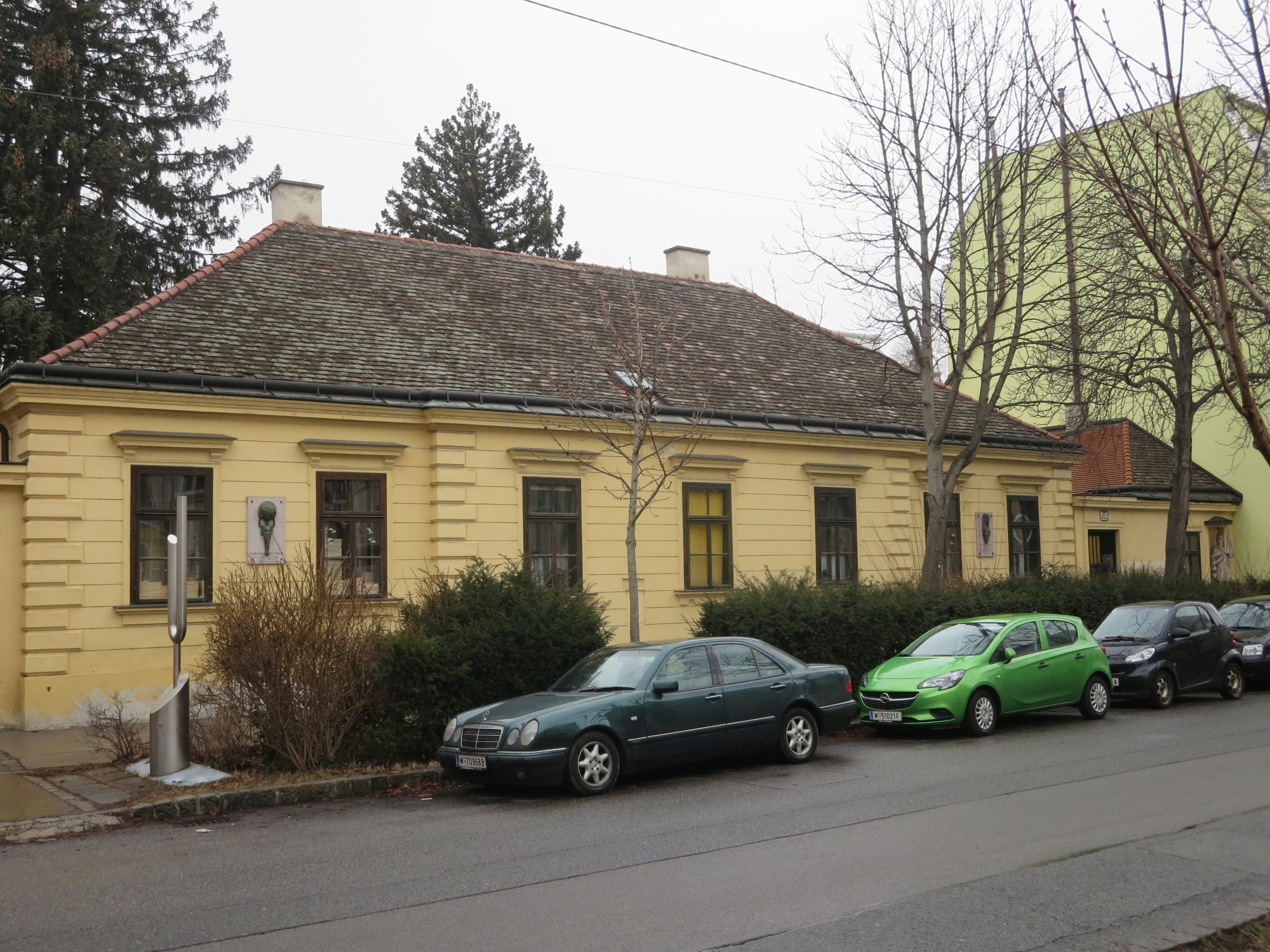
The Erdödy estate in Jedlesee, formerly a museum and memorial. A plaque commemorating Beethoven's frequent visits there can be seen on the wall at left (enlarged, middle), Marie's own plaque (enlarged, top) at far right.

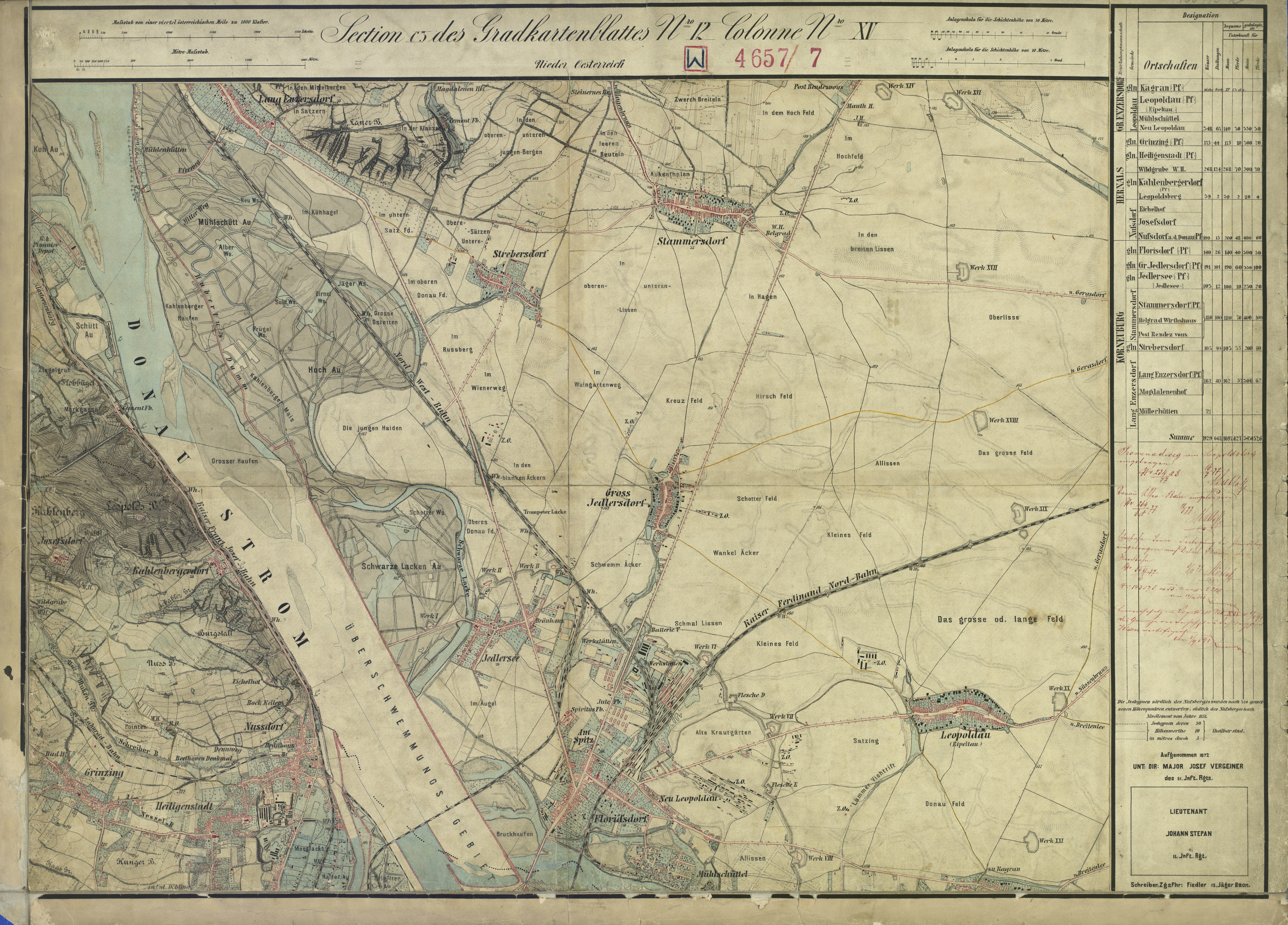
1872 map, showing "Jedlersee" on the east bank of the Danube, and Klosterneuburg on the west

In her second biographical study of the composer, Beethoven scholar Gail S. Altman investigates Maynard Solomon's claims for the identity of the woman who Beethoven, in an undated letter found among his effects, called his "Immortal Beloved" (Unsterbliche Geliebte). Altman builds a thorough-reasoned case—using Solomon's own criteria—for Anna Maria Erdődy as the preferred putative recipient of the letter. Questioning Solomon's attribution of the place-initial "K", in the Immortal Beloved letter, to Karlsbad, she offers in its place the hypothesis that "K" might instead refer to Klosterneuburg, then the closest post-stop to Marie Erdödy's estate at Jedlesee and to her summer residence at Hernals, Klosterneuburg's neighbouring villages north of Vienna, it being documented how familiar the couple had grown since at least the year 1808, and noting Marie's 1805 separation from her husband. Musicologist Barry Cooper questions Altman's Klosterneuburg attribution, as Jedlesee is on the east bank of the Danube, and Klosterneuburg on the west, without a crossing. But Altman makes clear that in summer 1812 Marie was at Hernals, on the west bank of the Danube. Altman says in summing up that Beethoven visited Hernals in September 1812, "and therefore saw his Beloved as he had indicated he would in his letter to her", adding that, wherever Beethoven expected to be at the time he wrote the letter was where the Beloved would have been, both to receive the letter and to reunite with him.

== Depiction in film ==
Countess Erdody is portrayed by actress Isabella Rossellini in Bernard Rose's 1994 film Immortal Beloved, where she reminisces of her time with Beethoven (Gary Oldman) with Felix Schindler (Jeroen Krabbe). She in turn plays cello in the first performance of the Ghost Trio, which were written while Beethoven was staying at her estate in 1809.
