= Staufen im Breisgau =

- Town
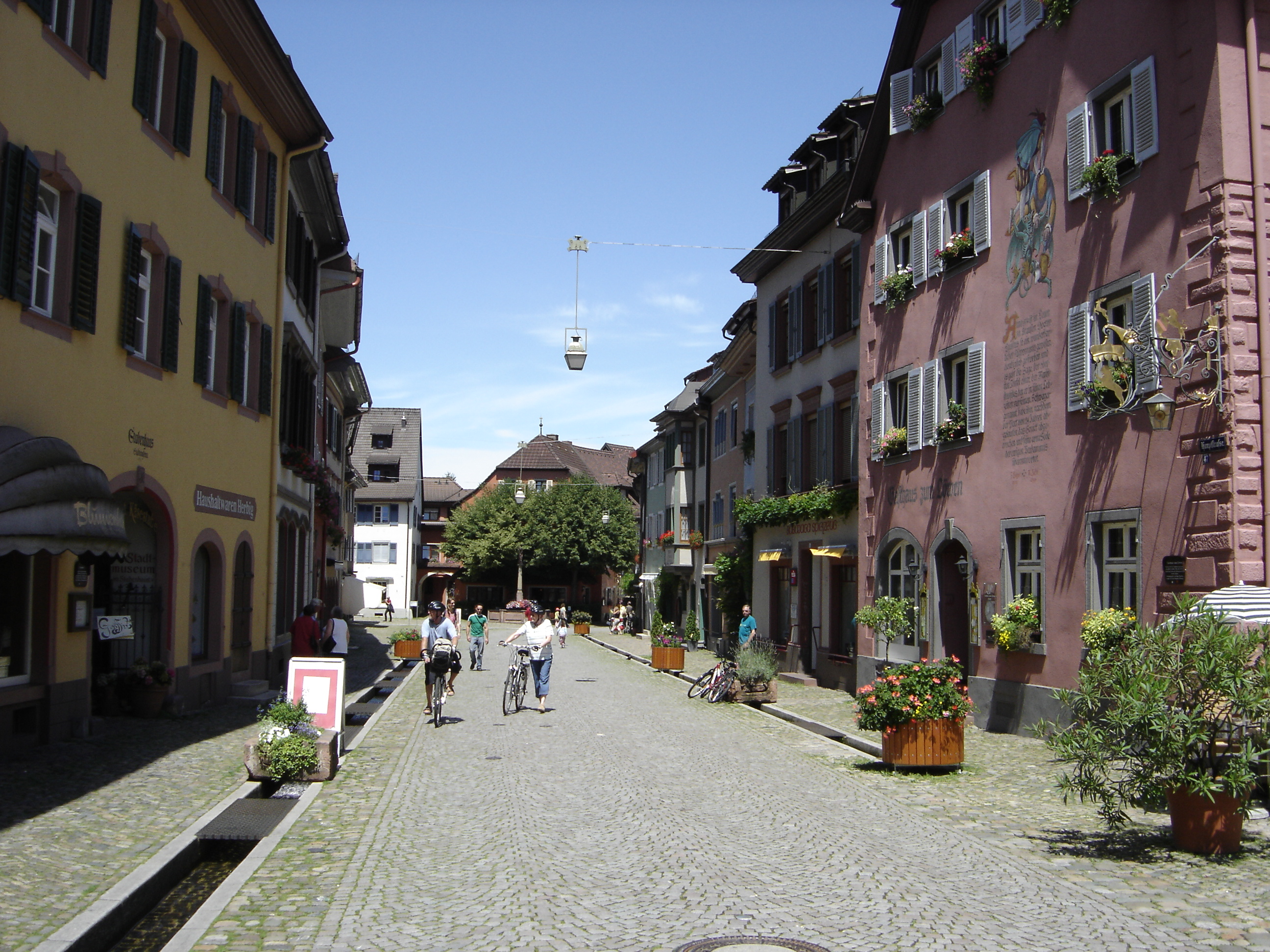

- Flag Coat of arms

- Location of Staufen im Breisgau within Breisgau-Hochschwarzwald district
- Interactive map of Staufen im Breisgau
- Location within Germany Location within Baden-Württemberg
- Coordinates: 47°52′53″N 7°43′53″E
- Country: Germany
- State: Baden-Württemberg
- Admin. region: Freiburg
- District: Breisgau-Hochschwarzwald
- Subdivisions: 3

Government
  - Mayor (2017–25): Michael Benitz

Area
  - Total: 23.32 km^{2} (9.00 sq mi)
- Elevation: 284 m (932 ft)

Population (2025-12-31)
  - Total: 8,392
  - Density: 359.9/km^{2} (932.0/sq mi)
- Time zone: UTC+01:00 (CET)
  - Summer (DST): UTC+02:00 (CEST)
- Postal codes: 79219
- Dialling codes: 07633
- Vehicle registration: FR
- Website: www.staufen.de

Staufen im Breisgau (German pronunciation: [ˈʃtaʊfn̩ ʔɪm ˈbʁaɪsɡaʊ], lit. 'Staufen in the Breisgau'; High Alemannic: Staufe im Brisgau) is a German town in the Breisgau-Hochschwarzwald district of Baden-Württemberg. It had a population of approximately 8,300 in 2019.

== General ==
The city of Staufen im Breisgau lies in the district of Breisgau-Hochschwarzwald in the German state of Baden-Württemberg. Staufen has approximately 7,700 inhabitants and forms, together with the community of Münstertal, Black Forest, a community administrative unit.

It is noted in history and culture for its association with Faust who, according to one source, died in or near Staufen around 1540.

== Geography ==
Staufen lies at the foot of the Black Forest at the exit from the Münstertal. The Black Forest valley of Neumagen goes here directly over into the Rhine plain. The piedmont of the Black Forest is less distinct. North of the valley exit, the steeply rising old castle ruins dominates; to the southwest begins the hilly landscape of the Markgräflerland. Staufen lies on the border between two natural and economic areas: the Rhine plain up to the piedmont with its cultivation of grain, vineyards and vegetables; and the Black Forest, with its cattle and wood, and, until the 19th century, silver mines.

== Geothermal drilling controversy ==
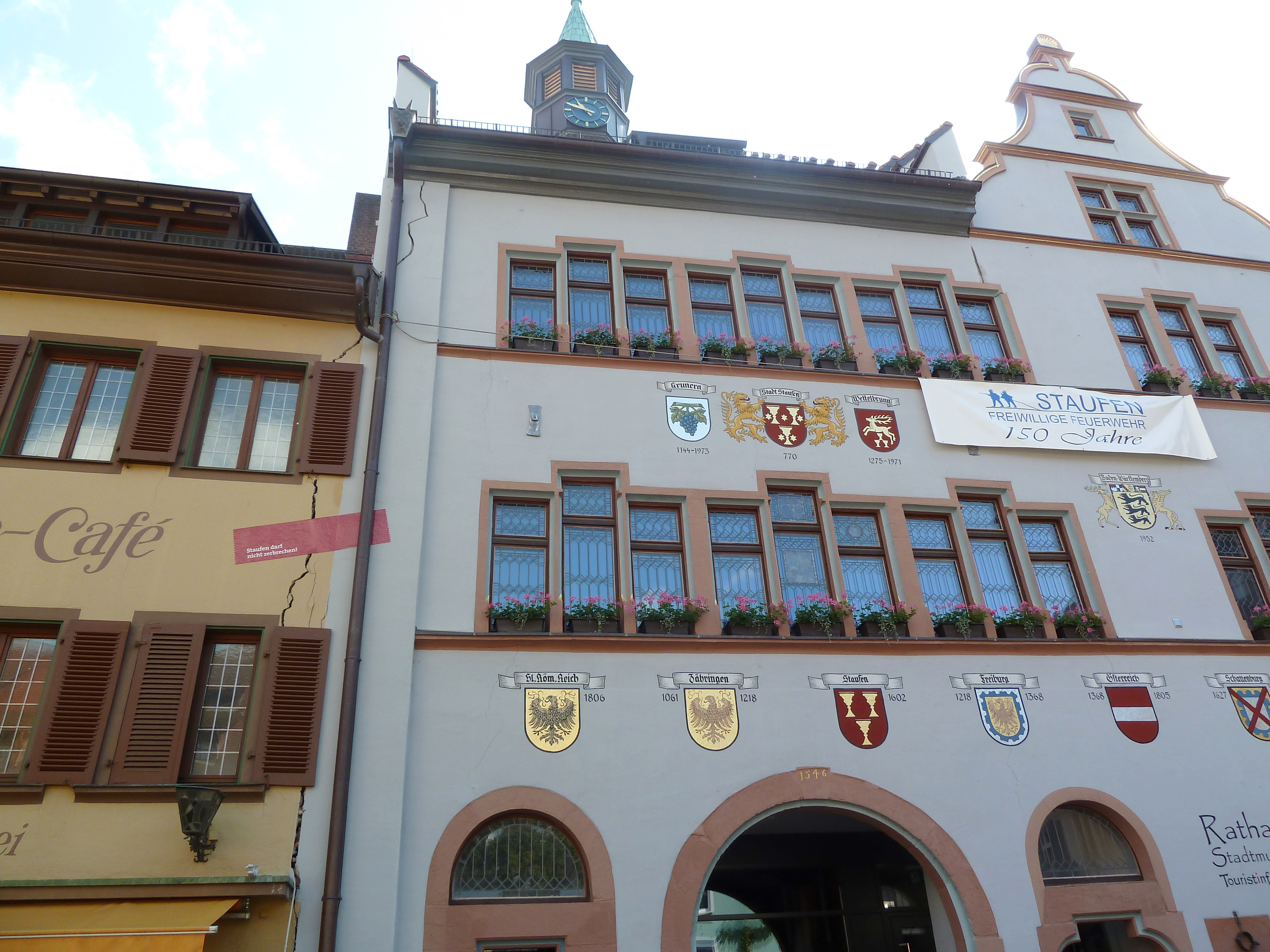
Cracks at the historic Town Hall due to damage from geothermal drilling. To the left, a piece of fake tape reading Staufen darf nicht zerbrechen! (Staufen must not fall apart!), protesting the damage.

Since 2008, the centre of the city has reported to have risen some 12 centimetres (4.7 in), after initially sinking a few millimeters. This has caused considerable damage to buildings in the city centre, including the historical town hall.

The cause for this geological change has been identified as a drilling operation conducted in the summer and autumn of 2007 to provide geothermal heating to the city hall. The drilling perforated an anhydrite layer and caused high-pressure groundwater to come into contact with the anhydrite, which then began to expand.

By 2010, some sections of town had risen by 30 centimetres (12 in). In July 2013, no end to the rising process was in sight.

Data from the TerraSAR-X radar satellite before and after the changes have confirmed the localised nature of the situation. "A geochemical process called anhydrite swelling has been confirmed as the cause of these uplifts. This is a transformation of the mineral anhydrite (anhydrous calcium sulphate) into gypsum (hydrous calcium sulphate). A pre-condition for this transformation is that the anhydrite is in contact with water, which is then stored in its crystalline structure".

== Infrastructure ==
Staufen is located next to the Münstertal railway which runs from Bad Krozingen to Münstertal, Black Forest. The railway was electrified in 2013 and is operated by the Südwestdeutsche Verkehrs-Aktiengesellschaft (SWEG).

=== Leisure and sports facilities ===
The Alemannenbad is a solar-heated outdoor pool with a large sunbathing area. After the Lorettobad in Freiburg, it is the oldest outdoor swimming pool in Baden-Württemberg. The buildings in the entrance area and the changing rooms are under monument protection. The Alemannenbad Staufen eV association was founded in 2003 to provide support. The history of the changing room and bathroom is extensively presented in an online publication.

== Notable people ==
- Michael Sattler (1490–1527), a monk who left the Roman Catholic Church during the Protestant Reformation and became a leader of the Anabaptist movement.
- Baron Ignaz von Gleichenstein (1778–1828), aristocrat and amateur cellist, friend of Ludwig van Beethoven
- Wolfgang Schäfer (born 1945), choral conductor and academic teacher.
- Heidi Wiesler (born 1960), former alpine skier, competed in the 1984 Winter Olympics.
