= Piano Sonata No. 28 (Beethoven) =

1816 composition by Ludwig van Beethoven

Piano Sonata
- No. 28
- by Ludwig van Beethoven
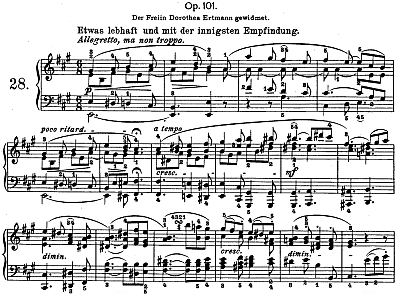
- Opening of Beethoven's Piano Sonata No. 28 in A major, Op. 101
- Key: A major
- Opus: 101
- Composed: 1816
- Dedication: Dorothea von Ertmann
- Published: 1817
- Movements: 4

The Piano Sonata No. 28 in A major, Op. 101, by Ludwig van Beethoven was composed in 1816 and published in 1817. Dedicated to the pianist Baroness Dorothea Ertmann, née Graumen, it is considered the first of the composer's late piano sonatas.

This sonata marks the beginning of what is generally regarded as Beethoven's final period, where the forms are more complex, ideas more wide-ranging, textures more polyphonic, and the treatment of the themes and motifs even more sophisticated than before. Op. 101 well exemplified this new style, and Beethoven exploited the newly expanded keyboard compass of the day.

== Background ==
As with the previous sonata, it is unclear why Beethoven wrote Op. 101. The earliest known sketches are on leaves that once formed the parts of the Scheide Sketchbook of 1815–16. It shows the first movement already well developed and notated as an extended draft in score, and there are also a few preliminary ideas for the final Allegro.

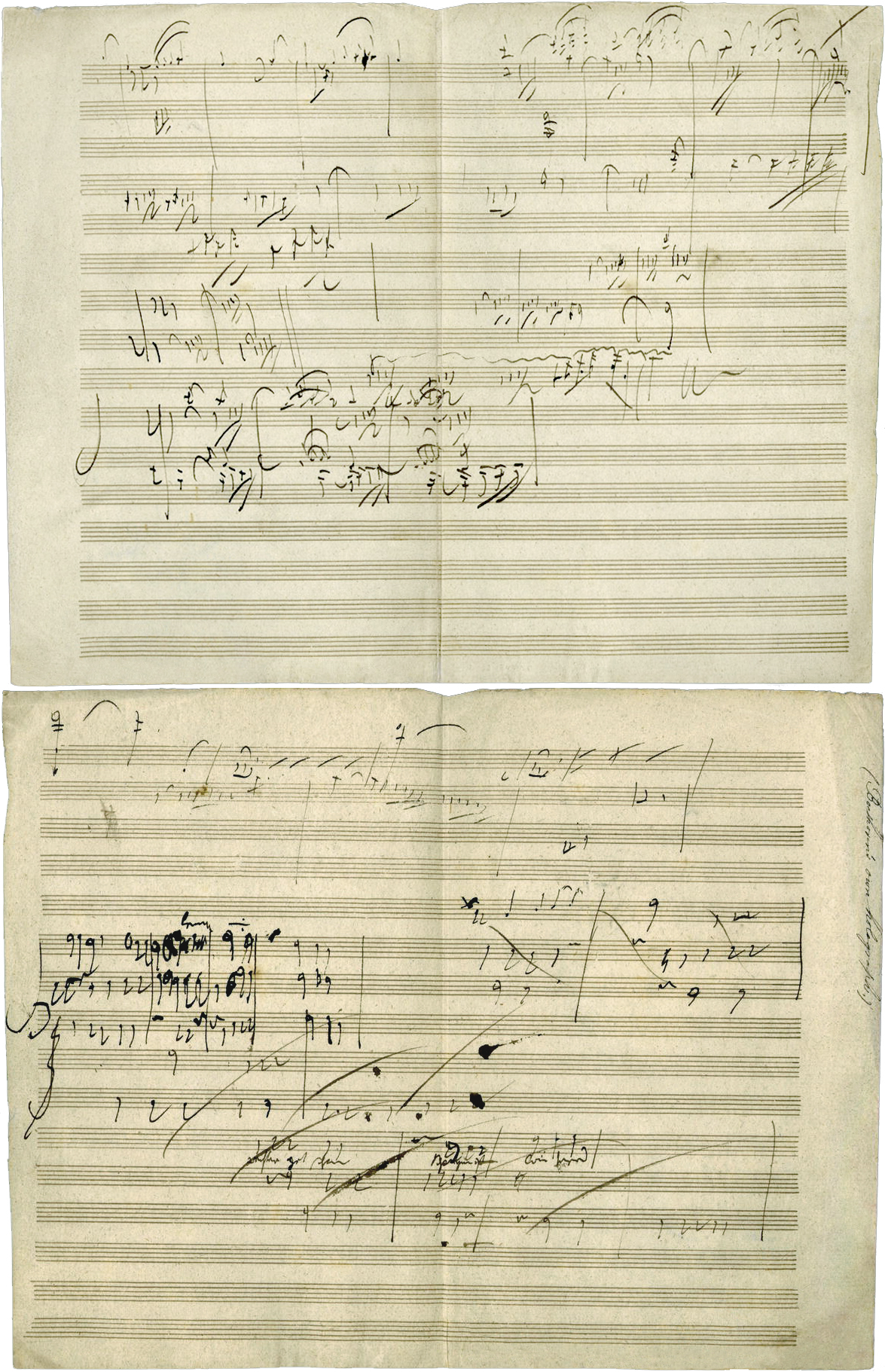
Beethoven's manuscript sketch for movement IV

Beethoven himself described this sonata, composed in the town of Baden, just south of Vienna, during the summer of 1816, as "a series of impressions and reveries." The more intimate nature of the late sonatas probably has some connection with his deafness, which by this stage was almost total, isolating him from society so completely that his only means of communicating with friends and visitors was via notebooks.

Beethoven offered the sonata for publication in a letter to Breitkopf and Härtel on 19 July 1816, when it was still far from complete. Eventually, it was sold to the local Viennese publisher Sigmond Anton Steiner after its completion. It was published in January 1817, and would appear in public the following month after delays.

The Piano Sonata No. 28, Op. 101 is the first of the series of Beethoven's "Late Period" sonatas (although sometimes Op. 90 is considered the first), when his music moved in a new direction toward a more personal, intimate, sometimes even introspective, realm of freedom and fantasy. In this period he had achieved a complete mastery of form, texture and tonality and was subverting the very conventions he had mastered to create works of remarkable profundity and beauty. It is also characteristic of these late works to incorporate contrapuntal techniques (e.g. canon and fugue) into the sonata form.

This was the only one of his 32 sonatas that Beethoven ever saw played publicly; this was in 1816, and the performer was a bank official and musical dilettante.

== Movements ==
I. Etwas lebhaft und mit der innigsten Empfindung

II. Lebhaft. Marschmäßig.

III. Langsam und sehnsuchtsvoll
IV. Geschwind, doch nicht zu sehr, und mit Entschlossenheit
Performed by Daniel Veesey; from Musopen

This piano sonata consists of four movements:

1. Etwas lebhaft, und mit der innigsten Empfindung (Somewhat lively, and with innermost sensibility). Allegretto, ma non troppo
2. Lebhaft, marschmäßig (Lively, march-like). Vivace alla marcia
3. Langsam und sehnsuchtsvoll (Slow and longingly). Adagio, ma non troppo, con affetto
4. Geschwind, doch nicht zu sehr, und mit Entschlossenheit (Swiftly, but not overly, and with determination). Allegro

A complete performance of the work takes about 19–22 minutes.

=== I. Allegretto, ma non troppo ===
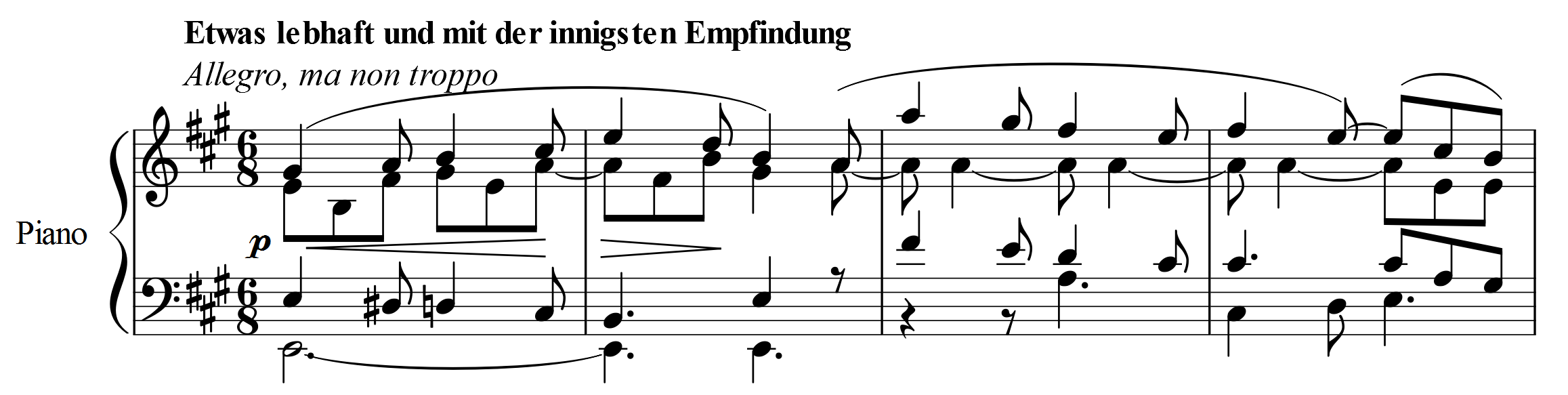

This movement is in A major, 6/8 time, and in sonata form. The tempo marking for the opening movement, Etwas Lebhaft und mit der innigsten Empfindung, is roughly translated as "somewhat lively and with the warmest feeling." (This term is used on the first published score but not on the autograph, which has only "Allegretto ma non troppo.)

Four-part harmony and contrapuntal texture is used throughout the movement. Though the sonata is marked as being in A major, Beethoven does not write any cadences on the tonic key; the exposition and development do not include a single root position A major chord. The first tonic chord in root position appears towards the end of the recapitulation. It appears once more at the end of the recapitulation, but even then is blunted by the omission of the fifth scale degree.

=== II. Vivace alla marcia ===
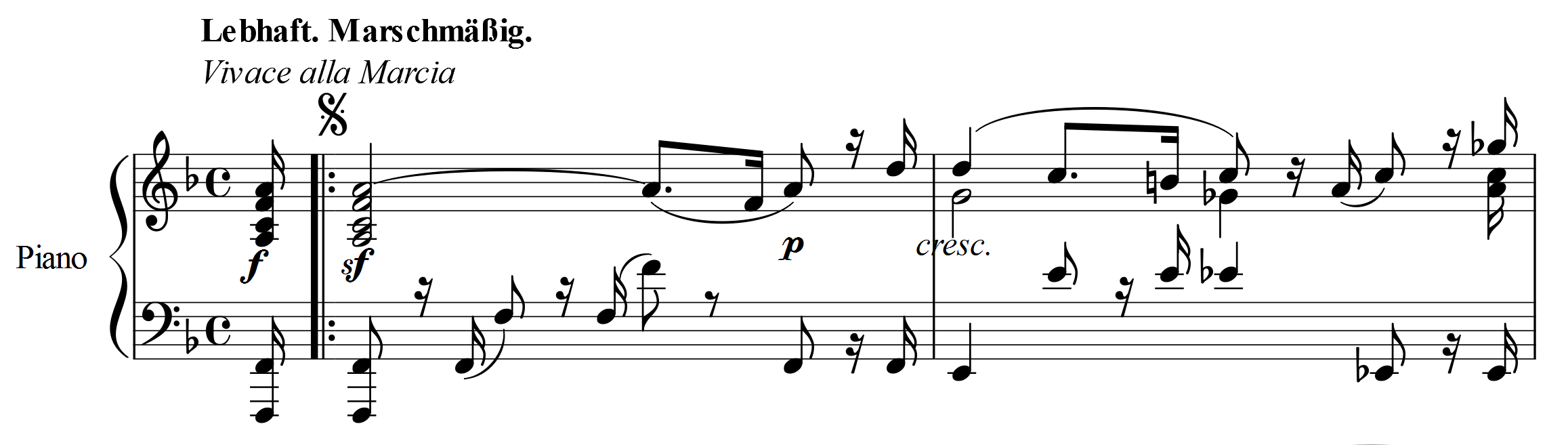

The second movement is in F major, 4/4 time. It takes the form of a march in ternary form, and is characterized by dotted rhythms, harmonic dislocation and alternation between static and accelerando. The middle section is in B♭ major, mostly composed in strict canonic structure.

=== III. Adagio, ma non troppo, con affetto ===
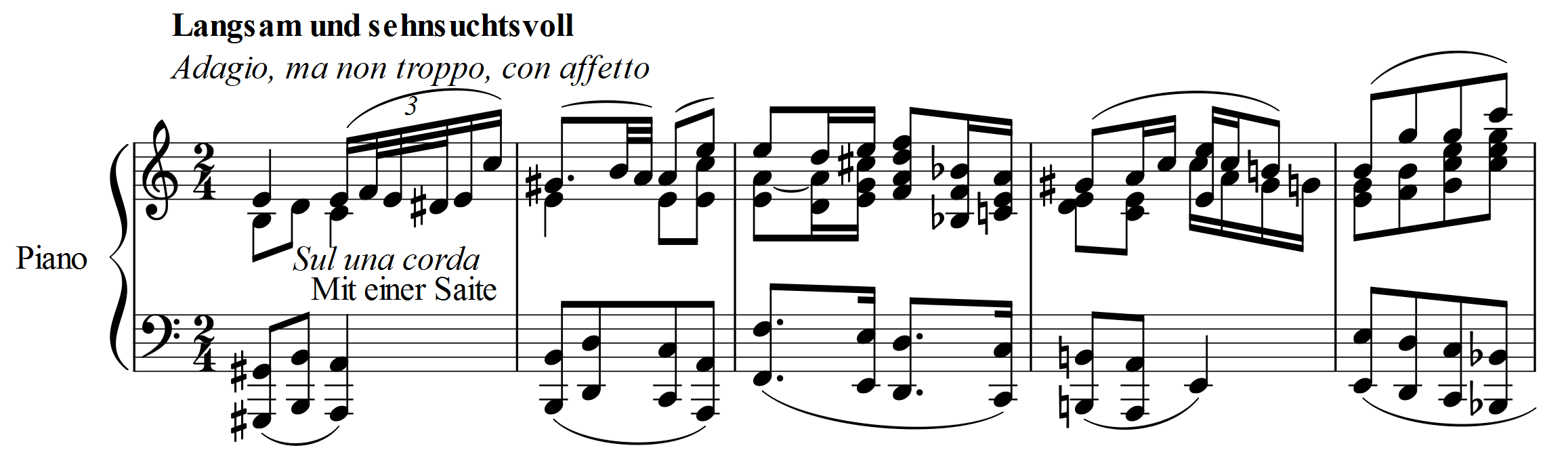

The third movement is in A minor, and in 2/4 time. The opening melody of the first movement is recalled just as the movement nears its conclusion and segues into the finale.

=== IV. Allegro ===
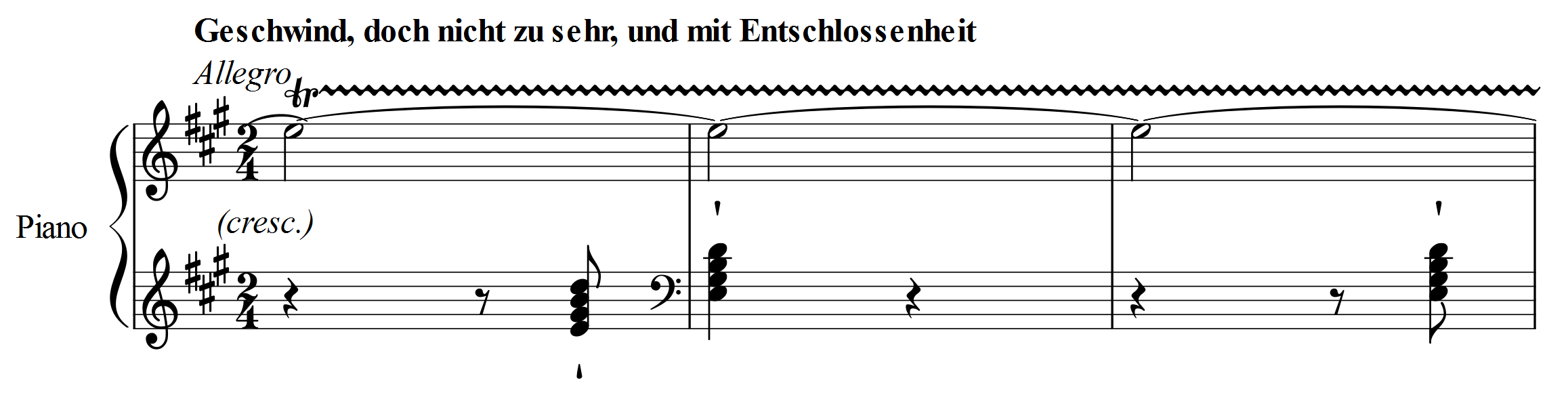

The Finale in 2/4 time begins without pause, and returns to the key of the first movement, in A major. It is a grand contrapuntal movement in which Beethoven explored the newest keyboard set in his command, using the lowest E (E_{1}) on the piano (marked "Contra E"), at the retransition and near the end of the movement. This movement is the longest and most technically challenging one in the sonata, including a dense and 100-bar-long fugato in four voices as its development section.
