= Gail S. Altman =

American biographer

Gail S. Altman is an educator, biographer, and Beethoven scholar notable for her published studies of two of the more disputed aspects of the life of composer Ludwig van Beethoven (1770–1827).

In the first of these, Fatal Links: the Curious Deaths of Beethoven and the Two Napoleons, Altman puts forward the hypothesis that Beethoven's death was the result of deliberate poisoning on the part of agents of the Viennese authorities, at the same time drawing parallels with the deaths (by similar symptoms) of Napoleon Bonaparte and his son Napoleon II, the latter at the hands of the same Viennese authorities, by whom he was kept a virtual prisoner throughout most of his short life. Fatal Links draws on source evidence of letters and eye-witness reports and, while she was not privy to subsequent medical analysis of Beethoven's hair, Altman's conclusions – that Beethoven showed symptoms of lead or arsenic poisoning – accord well with the result of the chemical analysis.

In her second, and more substantial, biographical study of the composer, Altman investigates and refutes the claims of Maynard Solomon for the identification of the woman who Beethoven, in an undated letter found among his effects, referred to as his "Immortal Beloved" (Unsterbliche Geliebte), while building a thorough case—using Solomon's own criteria—for Anna Maria Erdődy as the putative recipient of the letter.

Altman questions Solomon's attribution of the place-initial "K", in the Immortal Beloved letter, to Karlsbad, offering in its place the hypothesis that "K" might instead refer to Klosterneuburg (misspelled Klosterneuberg in Altman's book), the closest post-stop to Anna-Marie Erdödy's estate at Jedlesee (also spelled Jedlersee), both Klosterneuburg and Jedlesee lying near Vienna, Beethoven's career-long domicile.
