= Divertimento for String Trio (Mozart) =

1788 composition by W. A. Mozart

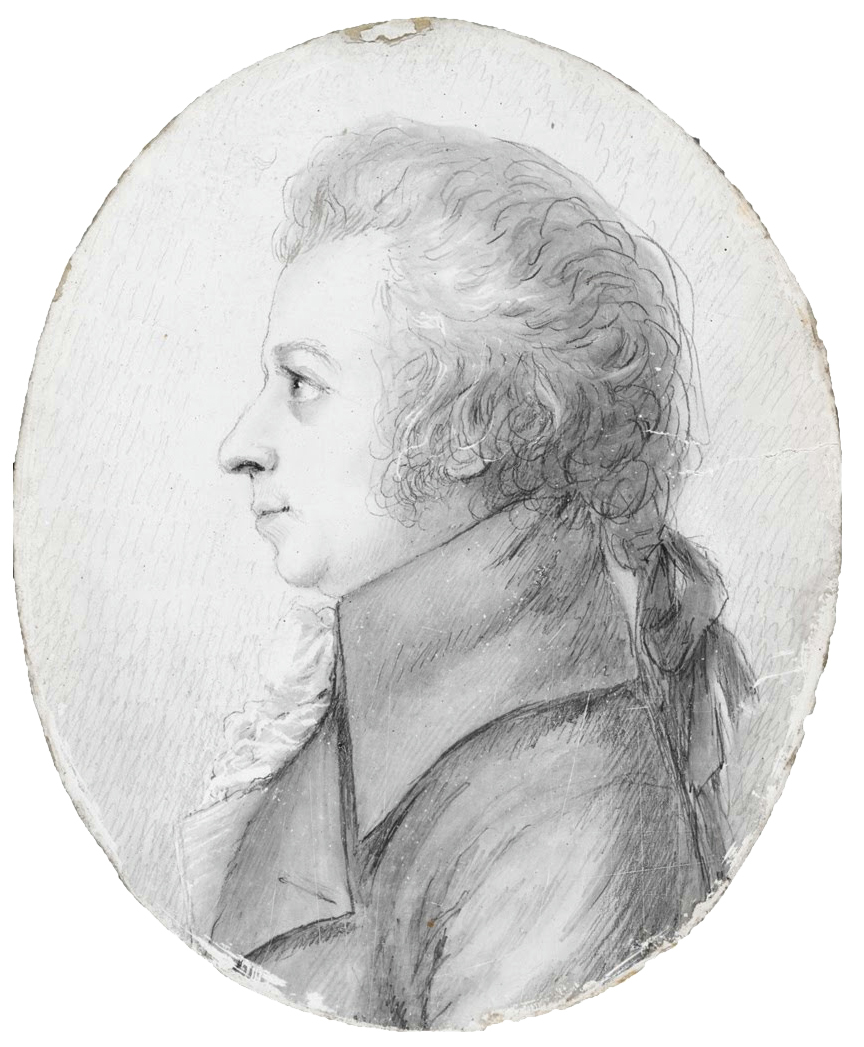
Stock's 1789 miniature of Mozart

The Divertimento for String Trio in E♭ major, K. 563, is a string trio written by Wolfgang Amadeus Mozart in 1788, the year in which he completed his last three symphonies (nos. 39–41) and his "Coronation" Piano Concerto. It is his last divertimento and different from his other divertimenti not only in its instrumentation but also in its compositorial ambition and scope.

The work was completed in Vienna on 27 September 1788 and is dedicated to Michael von Puchberg, a friend and fellow Freemason, who lent money to Mozart. The premiere was in Dresden on April 13, 1789, with Anton Teyber taking the violin part, Mozart playing viola and Antonín Kraft playing cello. At the time Mozart was conducting a tour of German cities, on his way to Berlin (see Mozart's Berlin journey).

== Movements ==
The work is in six movements:

1. Allegro (sonata form,)
2. Adagio (A♭ major, sonata form, 3/4)
3. Menuetto (Allegretto) – Trio (E♭ major, ternary form, 3/4)
4. Andante (B♭ major, theme and 7 variations "intertwined", 2/4)
  The first eight measures are the first phrase of the theme; the next eight are the first phrase of variation 1; mm. 17–32 give the conclusion of the theme; and mm. 33–48 the conclusion of variation 1. This pattern of treating the variations in pairs continues with variations 2 and 3 in mm. 49–96 and variations 4 and 5 in mm. 97–144. The 6th variation, in B♭ minor, is contrapuntal and chromatic, and the 7th returns to B♭ major, with the skeleton of the theme in the viola. This last variation melts seamlessly into a very brief coda which concludes the movement.
5. Menuetto (Allegretto) – Trio I – Trio II (E♭ major, rondo form, with the first trio in A♭ major and the second trio in B♭ major, 3/4)
6. Allegro (E♭ major, sonata rondo form, 6/8)

Recorded performances of the Divertimento range from 41 to 50 minutes.

== Critical reception ==
As Alfred Einstein wrote in Mozart: His Character, His Work (and as excerpted in the notes to a Kennedy Center performance), Mozart's only completed string trio shares with most divertimenti this six-movement format, but from that no lightness of tone should be understood – rather, "it is a true chamber-music work, and grew to such large proportions only because it was intended to offer ... something special in the way of art, invention, and good spirits. ... Each instrument is primus inter pares, every note is significant, every note is a contribution to spiritual and sensuous fulfilment in sound." Einstein called it "one of his noblest works".

Early performances of the work, however, were greeted with less enthusiasm. Tully Potter, in his notes to a recording, reports that when the Philharmonic String Trio of London performed the work in 1936, "that pompous old Wagnerian Ernest Newman reported that 'the work is over-long, and some of it mere music-spinning of the conventional eighteenth-century type'. He did, however, concede that 'the Adagio is an impressive piece of work' ". However, Potter also reports that when members of the Busch Quartet performed it in Basel in 1931, the painter Alfred Heinrich Pellegrini was so impressed that he made a painting of the performance.

Mozart's Divertimento in E♭ major is "one of a kind", according to the notes to an Emerson String Quartet performance.
