= Johann Baptist Malfatti von Monteregio =

Italian-Austrian physician (1775–1859)

- Born: June 12, 1775; Lucca, Republic of Lucca, Royal Italy
- Died: September 12, 1859 (aged 84); Hietzing bei Wien
- Other names: Giovanni Domenico Antonio Malfatti
- Occupation: Italian/Austrian doctor

Johann Baptist Malfatti, Edler von Monteregio baptized as Giovanni Domenico Antonio Malfatti (June 12, 1775, in Lucca – September 12, 1859, in Hietzing near Vienna) was an Italian/Austrian doctor famous for treating the composer Ludwig van Beethoven.

== Life ==
Son of a merchant, he studied medicine with Luigi Galvani in Bologna and Johann Peter Frank in Pavia whom he followed to Vienna in 1795 and with whom he competed as the secondary doctor at the Vienna general hospital. He finished his training in 1787 and founded the society of general practitioners in 1802 and founded his own practice in 1804. In 1809 he published his work of natural philosophy, "Draft pathogeny of Evolution and Revolution of Life."

During the Congress of Vienna he enjoyed an excellent reputation and became the personal physician of Archduke Karl and Archduchess Maria Beatrice d'Este of Modena. On December 31, 1821 he married Polish countess Helena Ostrowska (1794–1826). In 1822 the couple bore their first daughter and the Archduchess served as Godmother. The archduchess also granted him a pension for life. In 1830 he was also consulted by Franz, Duke of Reichstadt ("Napoleon II"). His house on Küniglberg, a hill in Hietzing, now a suburb of Vienna, inspired Malfatti to take the title, "Count of Monteregio," and he was awarded this title on April 10, 1837 for his contributions to medical science.

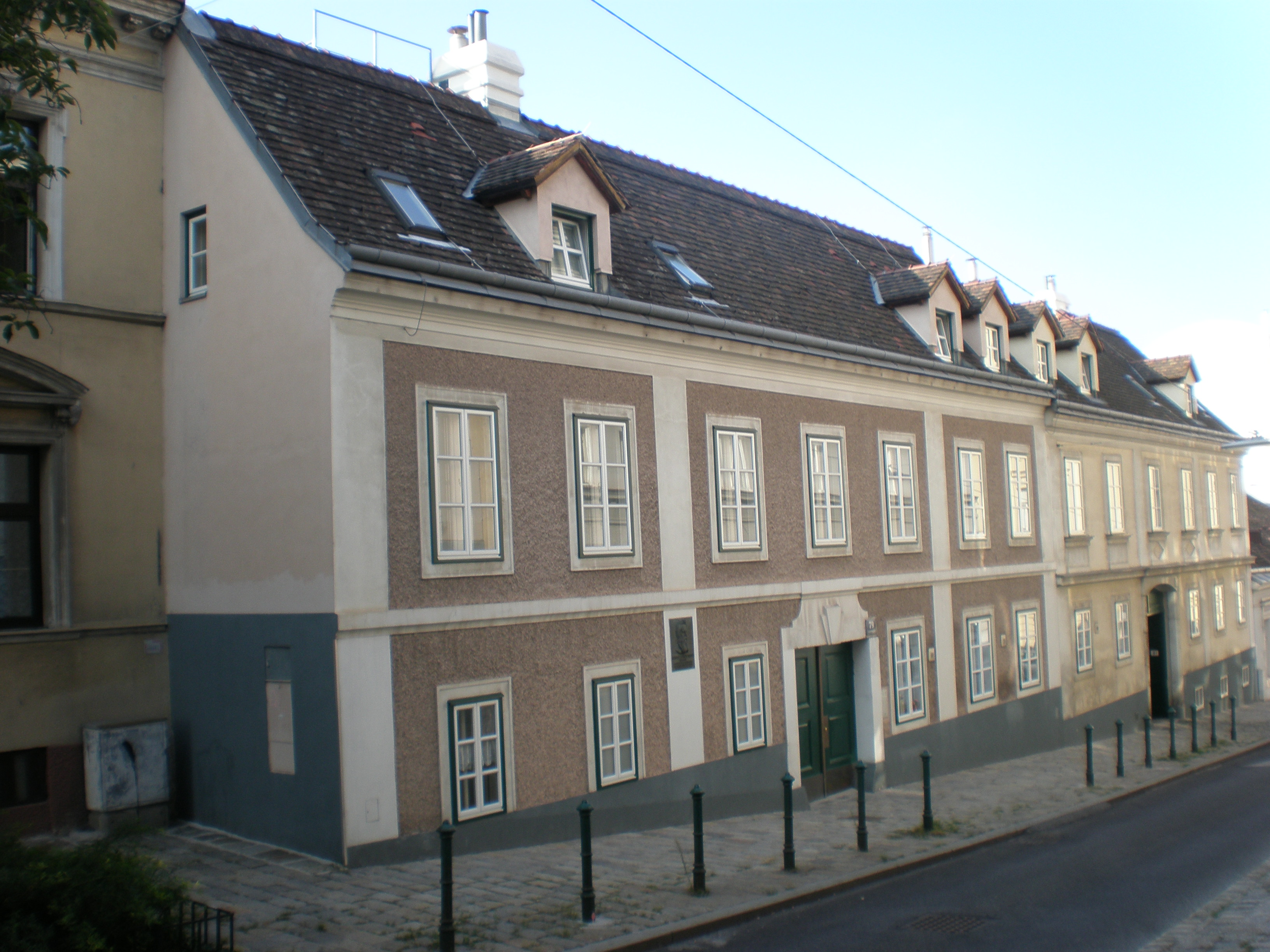
Haus Malfatti, his residence in Vienna's Weinhaus neighborhood

Ludwig van Beethoven first made Malfatti's acquaintance in 1809 and consulted him several times in the following years. In 1811, Malfatti advised Beethoven to take a cure in Teplitz. Beethoven composed his cantata WoO 103 Un lieto brindisi for the Malfatti's name day celebration on June 24, 1814 held at Malfatti's house in Vienna's Weinhaus (now a part of Währing) neighborhood. In 1817 the relationship suffered a rupture on account of Beethoven's frequent mistrust of others. Beethoven only consulted with Malfatti ten years later during his last illness, but Malfatti did not meet Beethoven's hopes for a cure.

Malfatti, together with his colleague Franz von Wirer, promoted the development of the great Austrian spas such as Bad Ischl and Bad Vöslau. He engaged in personal contact with the philosophers Franz Xaver von Baader and Friedrich Wilhelm Joseph Schelling, the naturalist Lorenz Oken, and the medical philosopher Ignaz Paul Vital Troxler.

He was buried in an honored grave in the Hietzing Cemetery, and the Malfattisteig in Vienna's Hietzing is named for him.

== Writings ==
- Entwurf einer Pathogenie aus der Evolution und Revolution des Lebens. Vienna 1809.
- Studien über Anarchie und Hierarchie des Wissens mit besonderer Beziehung auf die Medicin. Leipzig 1845, Paris 1849.
- Malfatti's neue Heilversuche: 1. Gelungene Vertilgung des grauen Staares durch eine neue äussere Heilmethode; 2. Häufige Entstehung des schwarzen Staares aus dem Raphagra. Erkenntniss und Behandlung dieser, so wie anderer (eben so oft verkannter) Krankheiten der Schedel-Suturen. Vienna 1847

== Bibliography ==
- August Hirsch (1884). "Johann Malfatti von Monteregio" . Allgemeine Deutsche Biographie (in German). Vol. 20. Leipzig: Duncker & Humblot. pp. 138–139.
- Sybille Albrecht: Leben und Werk von Johann Malfatti, Edler von Montereggio. Dissertation, Heidelberg 1974.
- Bruno Pincherle: Giovanni Malfatti medico di Beethoven e del Duca di Reichstadt. In: Bollettino dell'Istituto Storico Italiano dell'Arte Sanitaria. Volume 11 (1931), pp. 30–42.
- Friedrich Slezak: Italiener in Wien. In: Wiener Geschichtsblätter 43. Verein für Geschichte der Stadt Wien, Vienna 1988.
- Robert Stockhammer: Dr. Malfattis Beziehungen zu Beethoven. Österreichische Musikzeitschrift 10/1959.
- Constantin von Wurzbach: Malfatti, Edler von Monteregio, Johann in Biographisches Lexikon des Kaiserthums Oesterreich, 1856–1891, Vol 16, pp. 327–330
