= Franz von Wirer =

Austrian physician (1771–1844)

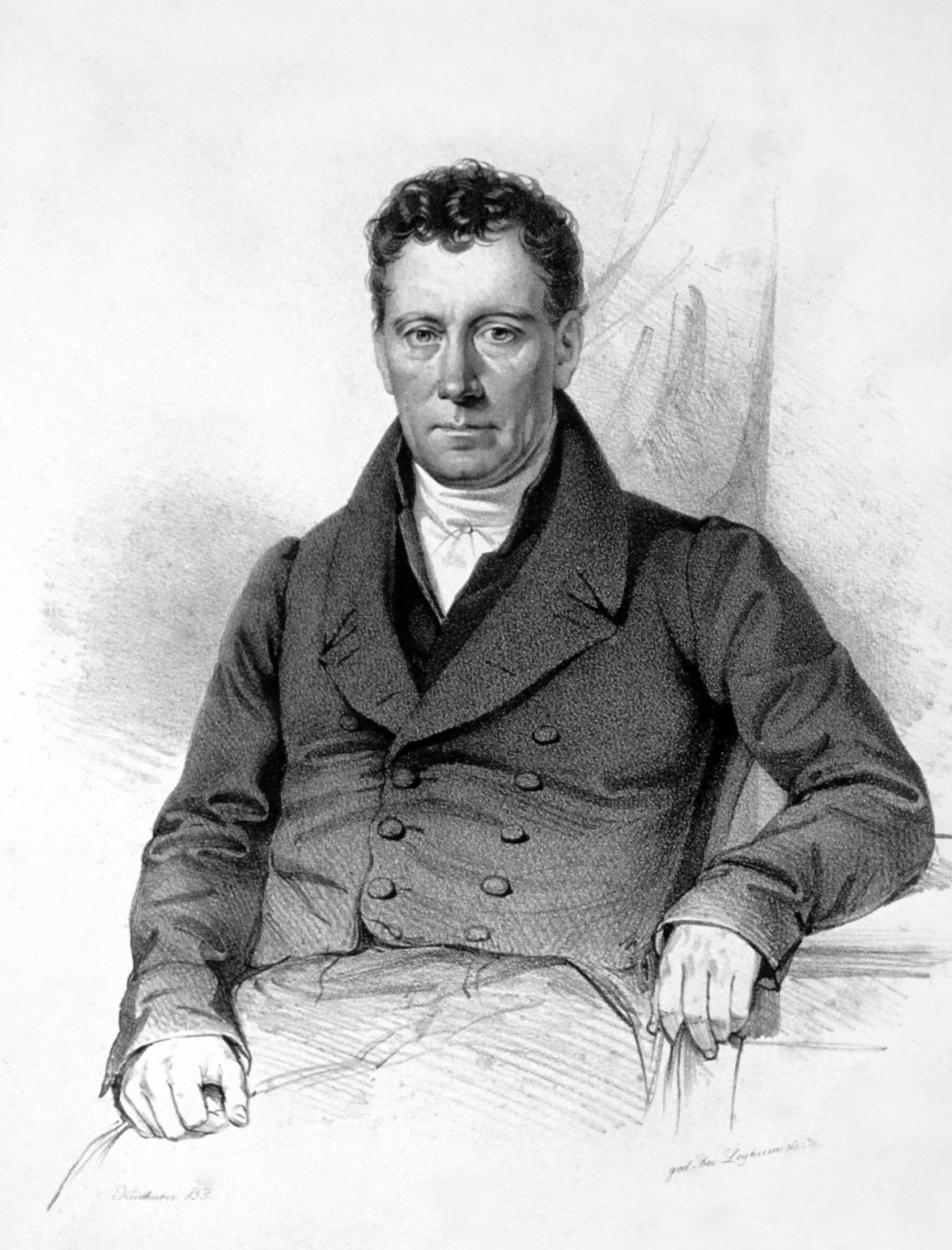
Franz von Wirer

Franz de Paula Augustin Wirer Ritter von Rettenbach (2 April 1771 – 30 March 1844) was an Austrian medical doctor who was a native of Korneuburg in Lower Austria. He was a physician to Austrian royalty, a rector at the University of Vienna and instructor at the Vienna Medical School.

Wirer was an advocate of holistic medicine, and in the early 1820s with Dr. Josef Götz, he developed the first Austrian saline water health spa at Bad Ischl. The two doctors believed in the therapeutic and curative effects of saline, and with Wirer's influence with Austrian royalty and medical community, the spa at Bad Ischl soon gained international acclaim. In the 19th century it became a popular vacation spot for European royalty and high society, particularly members of the Austrian and Austro-Hungarian Monarchy.
