= Paukovec =

Coordinates: 45°53′20″N 16°13′01″E

- Village
- Interactive map of Paukovec
- Country: Croatia
- County: Zagreb County

Area
  - Total: 7.9 km^{2} (3.1 sq mi)

Population (2021)
  - Total: 324
  - Density: 41/km^{2} (110/sq mi)
- Time zone: UTC+1 (CET)
  - Summer (DST): UTC+2 (CEST)

Paukovec is a village in Croatia.
