= Piano Trios, Op. 70 (Beethoven) =

1809 set of two musical works

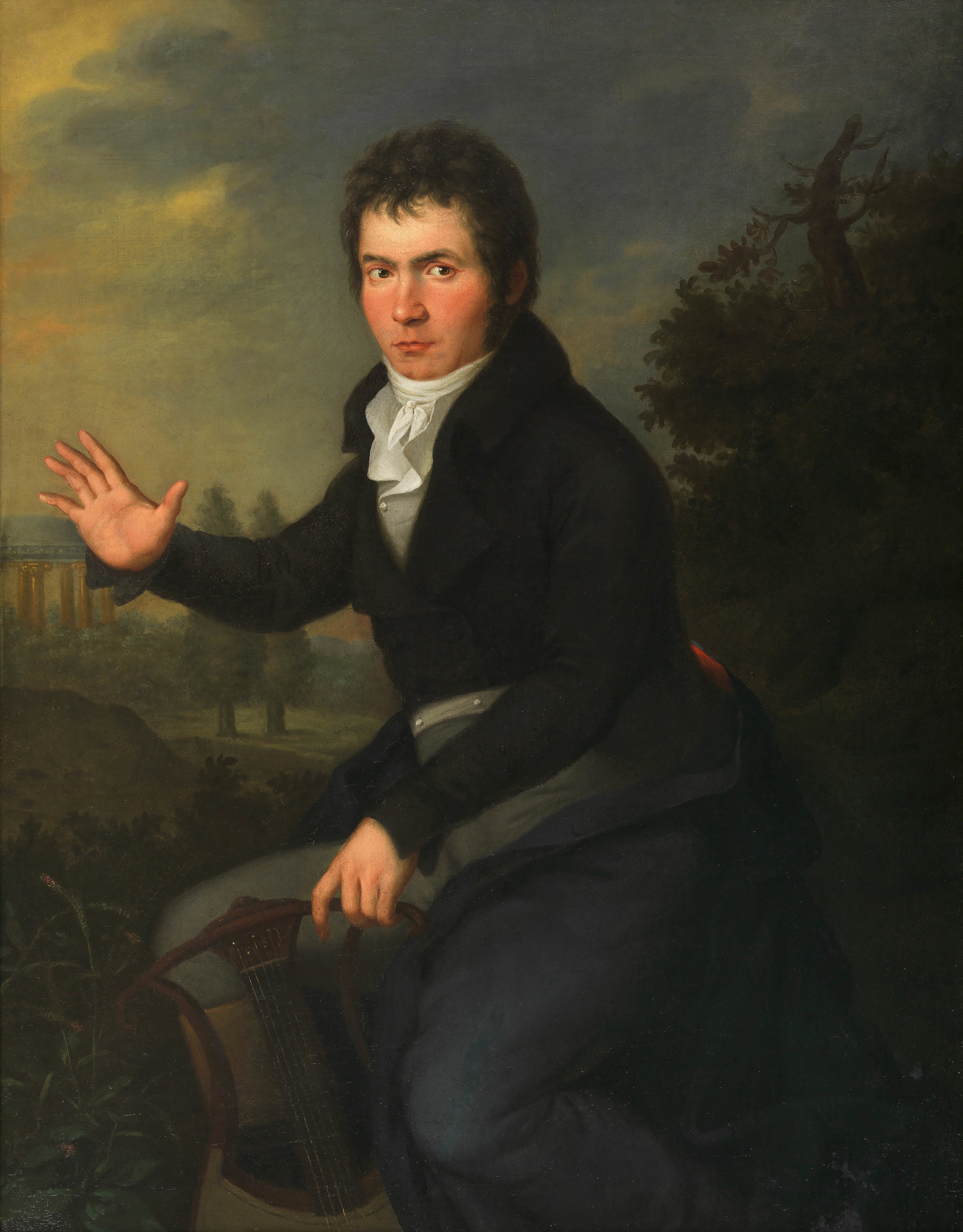
Portrait of Ludwig van Beethoven by Joseph Willibrord Mähler (c. 1804)

The Op. 70 Piano Trios is a set of two piano trios by Ludwig van Beethoven, written for piano, violin, and cello. Both trios were composed during Beethoven's stay at Countess Marie von Erdődy's estate, and both are dedicated to her for her hospitality. They were published in 1809.

The first, in D major, known as the Ghost, is one of his best known works in the genre (rivaled only by the Archduke Trio). The All-Music Guide states that "because of its strangely scored and undeniably eerie-sounding slow movement, it was dubbed the 'Ghost' Trio. The name has stuck with the work ever since. The ghostly music may have had its roots in sketches for a Macbeth opera that Beethoven was contemplating at the time." According to Lewis Lockwood, Beethoven's pupil Carl Czerny wrote in 1842 that the slow movement reminded him (Czerny) of the ghost scene at the opening of Shakespeare's Hamlet, and this was the origin of the nickname. James Keller also attributes the nickname to Czerny, adding, "You may discard as erroneous the oft-encountered claim that this movement of the Ghost Trio is a reworking of music Beethoven originally sketched as the Witches Chorus for his Macbeth.

These pieces are representative of Beethoven's "Middle" stylistic period, which went from roughly 1803 to 1812, and which included many of his most famous works. Beethoven wrote the two piano trios while spending the summer of 1808 back once again in Heiligenstadt, Vienna, where he had completed his Symphony No. 5 the previous summer. He wrote the two trios immediately after finishing his Sinfonia pastorale, Symphony No. 6. This was a period of uncertainty in Beethoven's life, in particular because he had no dependable source of income at the time.

Although these two trios are sometimes numbered as "No. 5" and "No. 6", the numbering of Beethoven's twelve piano trios is not standardized, and in other sources the two Op. 70 trios may be shown as having different numbers, if any.

== Piano Trio in D major, Op. 70 No. 1 "Ghost" ==
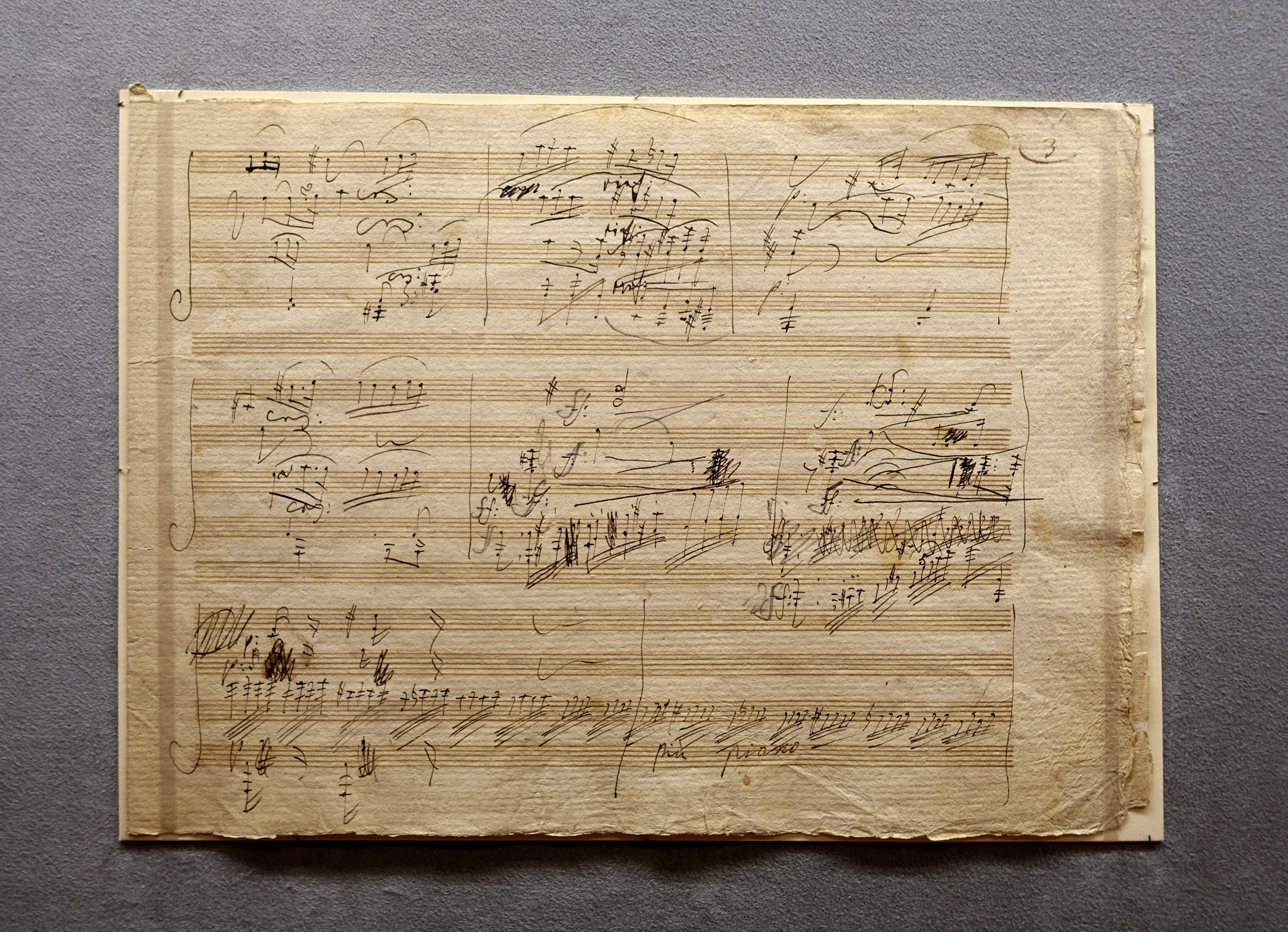
Piano Trio in D major, op. 70, no. 1, musical autograph

The first piano trio has three movements:

1. Allegro vivace e con brio, D major, 3/4
2. Largo assai ed espressivo, D minor, 2/4 [This movement is what gave the "Ghost Trio" its name]
3. Presto, D major, 4/4

== Piano Trio in E♭ major, Op. 70 No. 2 ==
The second piano trio has four movements:

1. Poco sostenuto – Allegro, ma non troppo, E♭ major, 4/4 – 6/8
2. Allegretto, C major/minor, 2/4
3. Allegretto ma non troppo, A♭ major, 3/4
4. Finale. Allegro, E♭ major, 2/4

The second movement is in double variation form.
