= Triple Concerto (Beethoven) =

Concerto by Ludwig van Beethoven

- by Ludwig van Beethoven
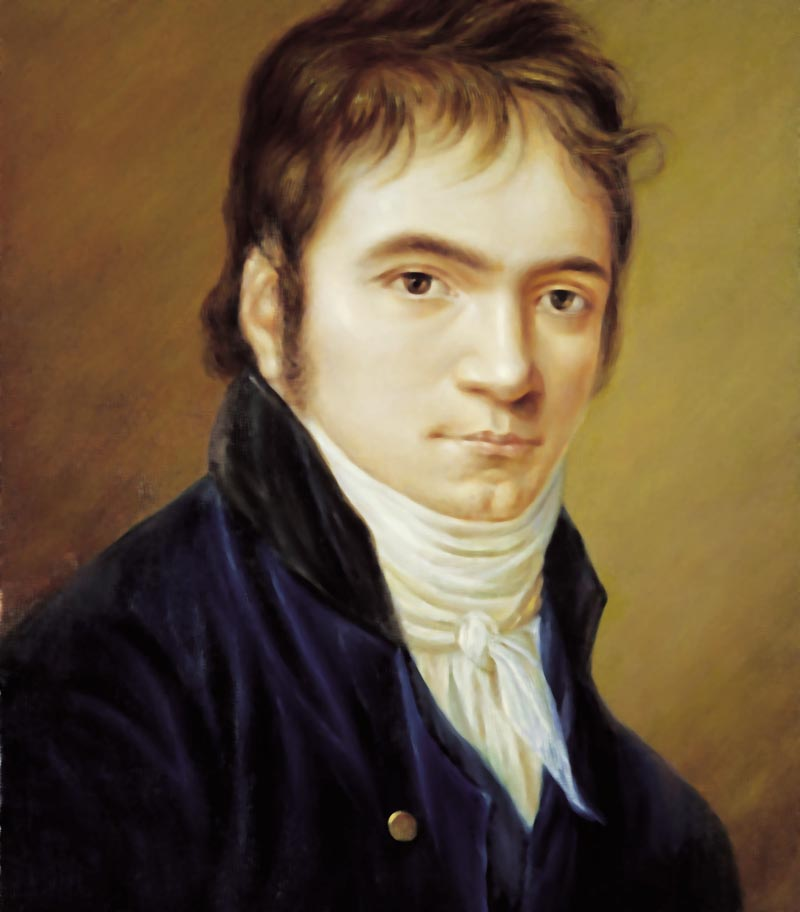
- Beethoven in 1803
- Key: C major
- Opus: 56
- Period: Classical
- Composed: 1803-1804
- Dedication: Joseph Franz von Lobkowitz
- Published: 1807
- Movements: Three
- Scoring: piano; violin; cello; orchestra

Ludwig van Beethoven's Concerto for Violin, Cello, and Piano in C major, Op. 56, commonly known as the Triple Concerto, was composed from 1803 to 1804, or beyond, and published in 1807 by Breitkopf & Härtel. The choice of the three solo instruments effectively makes this a concerto for piano trio, and it is the only concerto Beethoven ever completed for more than one solo instrument, and the only one he wrote for cello.

A typical performance takes about 37 minutes.

== History ==
Beethoven's early biographer Anton Schindler claimed that the Triple Concerto was written for Beethoven's royal pupil, the Archduke Rudolf of Austria. Rudolf, who became an accomplished pianist and composer under Beethoven's tutelage, was only in his mid-teens at the time, and it seems plausible that Beethoven's strategy was to create a showy but relatively easy piano part that would be backed up by two more mature and skilled soloists. But there is no record that Rudolf ever performed the work, and several Beethoven scholars have questioned Schindler's claim.

The Triple Concerto premiered in May 1808, at the summer Augarten concerts in Vienna. The violin soloist was Carl August Seidler, and the cellist was Nikolaus Kraft, who was known for "technical mastery" and a "clear, rich tone". The concerto was Beethoven's first work to use advanced cello techniques.

In the published version, the concerto bore a dedication to a different patron, Prince Joseph Franz von Lobkowitz.

A piano trio version of the concerto was arranged by Carl Reinecke.

== Music ==
In addition to the violin, cello, and piano soloists, the concerto is scored for one flute, two oboes, two clarinets, two bassoons, two horns, two trumpets, timpani, and strings. The flute, oboes, trumpets, and timpani are tacet during the second movement.

The concerto is divided into three movements:

1. Allegro
2. Largo (attacca)
3. Rondo alla polacca

=== I. Allegro ===
The first movement is broadly scaled and cast in a moderate march tempo, and includes decorative solo passagework and leisurely repetitions, variations, and extensions of assorted themes. A common feature is a dotted rhythm (short-long, short-long) that lends an air of graciousness and pomp that is not exactly "heroic," but would have conveyed a character of fashionable dignity to contemporary listeners—and perhaps a hint of the noble "chivalric" manner that was becoming a popular element of novels, plays, operas, and pictures. The jogging triplets that figure in much of the accompaniment also contribute to this effect.

In this movement, as in the others, the cello enters solo with the first subject. Unusual for a concerto of this scale, the first movement begins quietly, with a gradual crescendo into the exposition, with the main theme later introduced by the soloists. Also unusually, the exposition modulates to A minor instead of the expected G major. (Beethoven's friend Ferdinand Ries later did the same mediant transition in his sixth concerto.) This movement takes 16 to 19 minutes.

=== II. Largo ===
The slow movement, in A♭ major, is a large-scale introduction to the finale, which follows it without pause. The cello and violin share the melodic material of the movement while the piano provides discreet accompaniment. This movement takes about five to six minutes.

There is no break between the second and third movements.

=== III. Rondo alla polacca ===
Dramatic repeated notes launch into the third movement, a polonaise (also called "polacca"), an emblem of aristocratic fashion during the Napoleonic era, in keeping with the character of "polite entertainment" that characterizes the concerto as a whole. The bolero-like rhythm, also characteristic of the polonaise, can be heard in the central minor theme. This movement takes about 13 to 14 minutes.

== Recordings ==
Popular recordings of the Triple Concerto include:

- John Corigliano Sr., Leonard Rose, and Walter Hendl, under Bruno Walter, New York Philharmonic, 1949
- David Oistrakh, Sviatoslav Knushevitsky, and Lev Oborin, under Sir Malcolm Sargent, Philharmonia Orchestra, 1958
- Jaime Laredo, Leslie Parnas, and Rudolf Serkin, under Alexander Schneider, Marlboro Festival Orchestra, 1962
- Yehudi Menuhin, Maurice Gendron, and Hephzibah Menuhin, under István Kertész, London Symphony Orchestra, 1964
- Isaac Stern, Leonard Rose, and Eugene Istomin, under Eugene Ormandy, Philadelphia Orchestra, 1964
- David Oistrakh, Mstislav Rostropovich, and Sviatoslav Richter, under Herbert von Karajan, Berlin Philharmonic, 1969
- Suk Trio, under Kurt Masur, Czech Philharmonic, 1974
- Franzjosef Maier, Anner Bylsma, and Paul Badura-Skoda, Collegium Aureum, 1974
- Anne-Sophie Mutter, Yo-Yo Ma, and Mark Zeltser, under Herbert von Karajan, Berlin Philharmonic, 1979
- Trio Zingara, under Edward Heath, English Chamber Orchestra, 1988
- Itzhak Perlman, Yo-Yo Ma, and Daniel Barenboim, under Daniel Barenboim, Berlin Philharmonic, 1995
- Dong-Suk Kang, Maria Kliegel, and Jenő Jandó, under Béla Drahos, Nicolaus Esterházy Sinfonia, 1997
- Renaud Capuçon, Mischa Maisky, and Martha Argerich, under Alexandre Rabinovitch, Orchestra della Svizzera Italiana, 2003
- Thomas Zehetmair, Clemens Hagen, and Pierre-Laurent Aimard, under Nikolaus Harnoncourt, Chamber Orchestra of Europe, 2004
- Gordan Nikolitch, Tim Hugh, and Lars Vogt, under Bernard Haitink, London Symphony Orchestra, 2005
- Ilya Gringolts, Mario Brunello, and Alexander Lonquich, under Claudio Abbado, Simón Bolívar Youth Orchestra of Venezuela, 2006
- Yefim Bronfman, Gil Shaham, and Truls Mørk, under David Zinman, Tonhalle Orchestra of Zurich, 2006
- Wouter Vossen, Bart van de Roer, and Marc Vossen (Storioni Trio), under Jan Willem de Vriend, Netherlands Symphony Orchestra, 2013
- Anne-Sophie Mutter, Yo-Yo Ma, and Daniel Barenboim, West–Eastern Divan Orchestra, 2019
- Dmitry Sinkovsky, Alexander Rudin, and Alexei Lubimov, under Alexander Rudin, Musica Viva, 2020
- Isabelle Faust, Jean-Guihen Queyras and Alexander Melnikov, under Pablo Heras-Casado, Freiburger Barockorchester, 2021
