= Nikolaus Kraft =

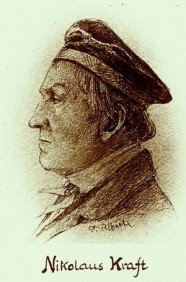

Background information
- Born: 14 December 1778; Eszterháza, Hungary
- Died: 18 May 1853 (aged 74) Cheb, Bohemia
- Genre: Classical
- Occupations: Musician, composer
- Instrument: Cello
- Father: Antonín Kraft

Nikolaus Kraft (14 December 1778, Eszterháza, Hungary – 18 May 1853, Cheb, Bohemia) was an Austrian cellist and composer (six cello concertos). He was the son of Antonín Kraft, under whom he first studied. He then trained under Jean-Louis Duport (1801). He claimed to have been the soloist for the premiere of Beethoven's Triple Concerto and played alongside Mozart and Anton Teyber on 12 April 1789 at Dresden on Mozart's Berlin journey.
