= Beethoven's musical style =

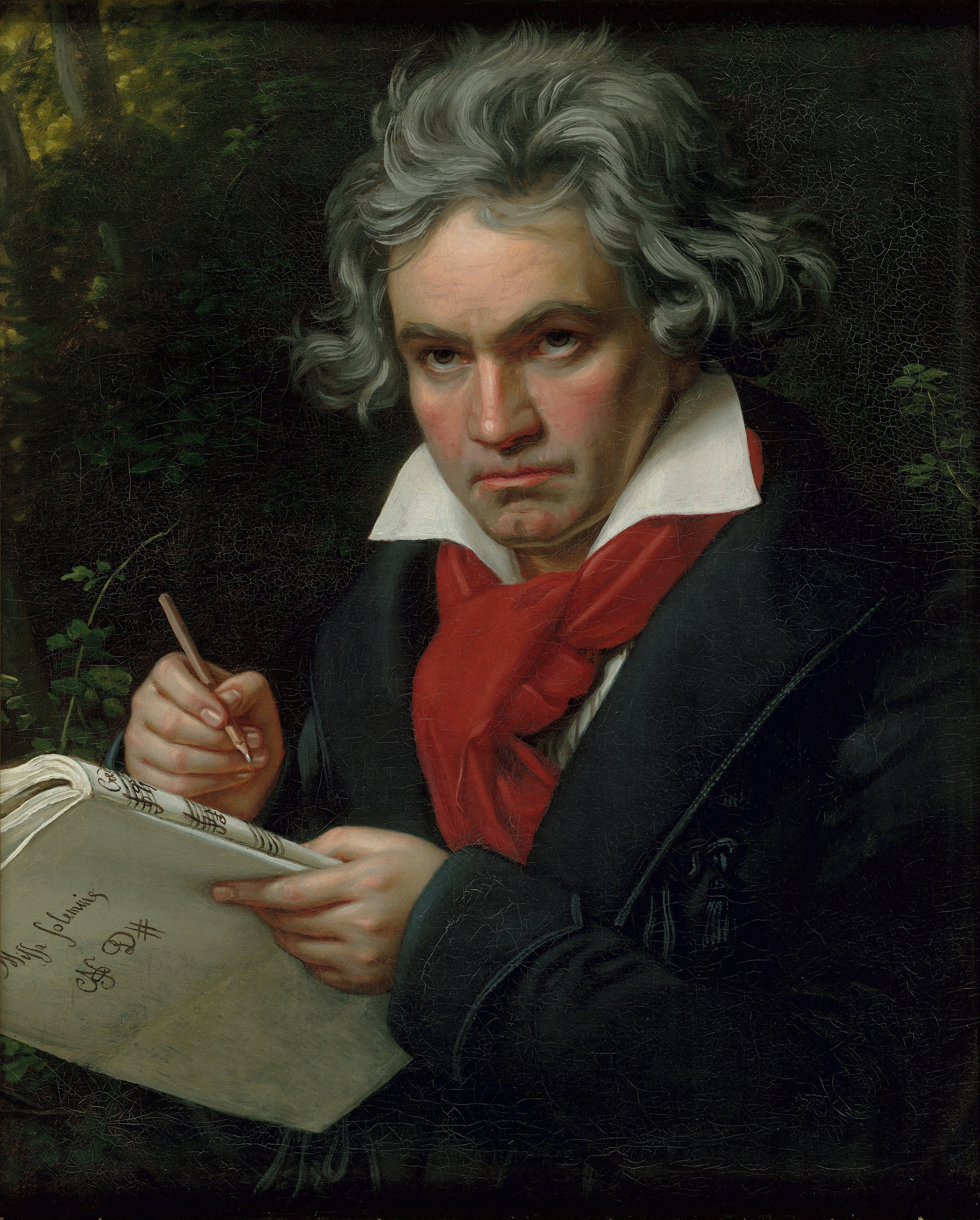
Ludwig van Beethoven

Ludwig van Beethoven is one of the most influential figures in the history of classical music. Since his lifetime, when he was "universally accepted as the greatest living composer", Beethoven's music has remained among the most performed, discussed and reviewed in the Western world. Scholarly journals are devoted to analysis of his life and work. He has been the subject of numerous biographies and monographs, and his music was the driving force behind the development of Schenkerian analysis. He is widely considered among the most important composers, and along with Bach and Mozart, his music is the most frequently recorded.

Beethoven expanded the formal and emotional scope – not to mention length – of nearly every genre in which he wrote. While he is most famous for his heightening of the symphonic form, Beethoven also had a crucial influence on the piano sonata, violin sonata, string quartet and piano concerto, among several others. Only in the realm of vocal composition – opera and the mass – was his effect on later generations muted.

Beethoven's stylistic innovations bridge the Classical and Romantic periods. The works of his early period brought the Classical form to its highest expressive level, expanding in formal, structural, and harmonic terms the musical idiom developed by predecessors such as Mozart and Haydn. The works of his middle period were more forward-looking, contributing to the musical language and thinking of the Romantic era, inspiring composers such as Franz Schubert, Felix Mendelssohn, Hector Berlioz, Robert Schumann, Franz Liszt, Richard Wagner, and Johannes Brahms. His late period works were characterized by formal, harmonic, and structural experimentation at the highest level, often pointing toward contrapuntal tendencies and microscopic textures, as well as an increasingly introverted compositional outlook. Though rightly credited as a major harbinger of the Romantic era in music that followed, Beethoven never abandoned fundamental aesthetical paradigms and a generally objective artistic philosophy characterizing musical Classicism to the same extent that later composers such as Berlioz or even Schubert did.

== Overview ==
Beethoven's musical output has traditionally been divided into three periods, a classification that dates to the first years after the composer's death in 1827 and was formalised with the publication of Wilhelm von Lenz's influential work Beethoven et ses trois styles (Beethoven and his Three Styles). Lenz proposed that Beethoven's creative output be marked by three periods of distinct stylistic personality and he identified specific compositions as milestones for each period. Lenz considers that the first period opens with the Piano Trios, Op. 1, and culminates with the performances in 1800 of his first symphony and Septet. The second period spans the period from the publication of his Moonlight Sonata to the Piano Sonata in E minor, Op. 90 in 1814. The last period covers Beethoven's works after Op. 90 to his death in 1827.

Although later scholars have called into question such a simplistic categorisation, it is still widely used. Extensive subsequent analytical consideration of Lenz's thesis has resulted in a slight revision of his original dates and broad consensus regarding Beethoven's three periods is as follows:

- a formative period that extends to 1802
- a middle period from 1802 to 1814,
- a late period from 1814 to 1827

Generally, each period demonstrates characteristic stylistic evolutions in Beethoven's musical language and preoccupations as well as important developments in the composer's personal life. For example, the middle period was ushered in by the 'Heiligenstadt Testament', a letter in which Beethoven, despairing about his hearing loss, considers and then rejects taking his life. On the other hand, the late period began with a period where Beethoven, suffering from the aftereffects of a myriad of personal and external crises, including the episode of the 'Immortal Beloved', struggled to compose for several years.

== Early period ==
Many of Beethoven's early works were not assigned an opus number and were simply listed with the label WoO, which is the abbreviation for the German term "works without opus number." Some, however, were published with opus numbers later on such as several compositions in the Eight Songs, op. 52. Although these were compiled between 1803 and 1805 and published in the latter year, were written during his early years in Vienna and Bonn.

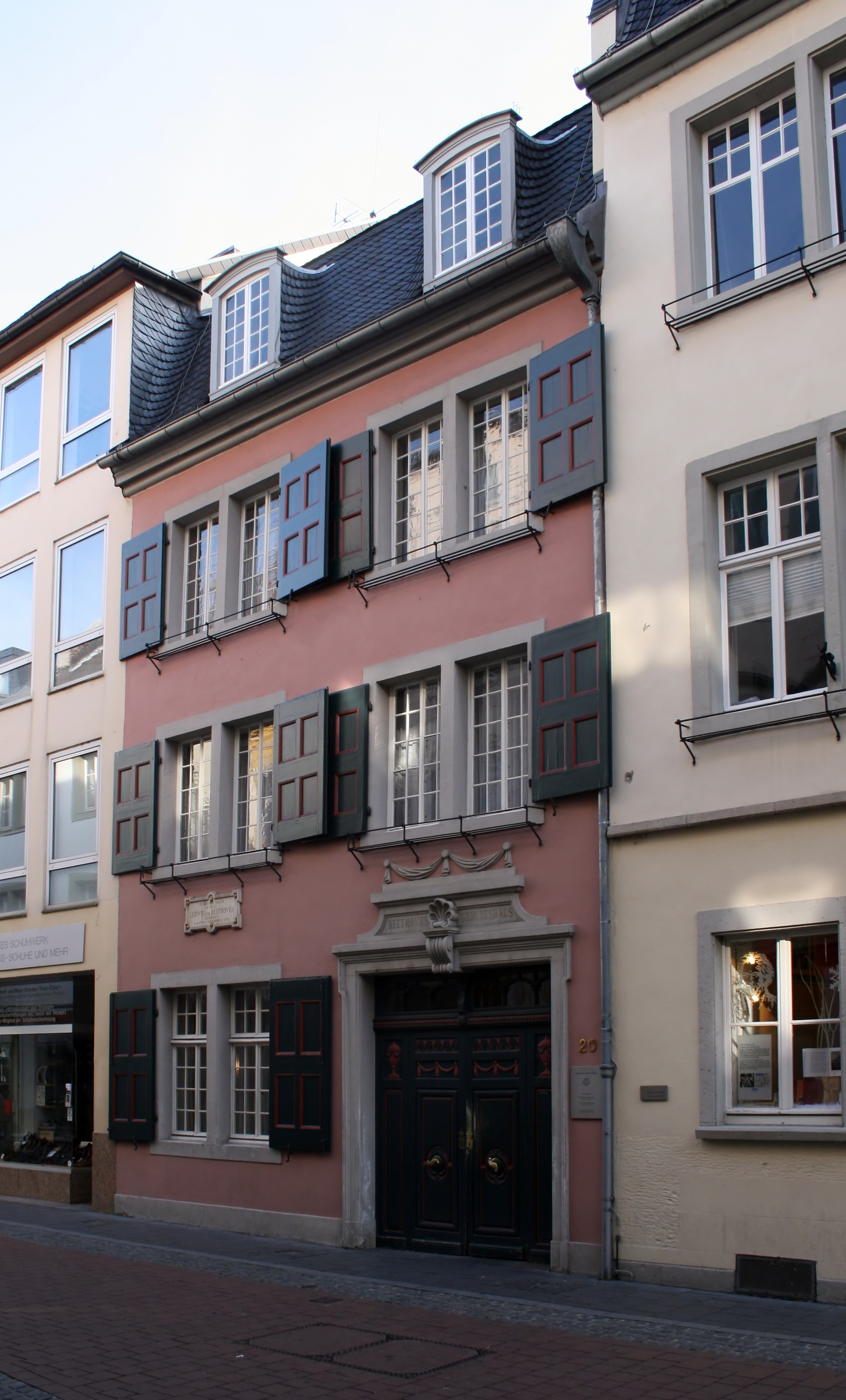
Beethoven's birthplace in Bonn, now Beethoven House

The compositions that Beethoven wrote in his formative period can be generally characterized by the composer's efforts to master the predominant classical language of the period. His works from this period can be subdivided into two, based on the composer's residence. First, various juvenalia, written when the adolescent Beethoven was in residence in Bonn and heavily indebted to the works of contemporaries, especially Mozart and his teacher, Christian Gottlob Neefe. These early efforts can be seen in a set of three piano sonatas (WoO 47) and piano quartets (WoO 36) that Beethoven wrote before 1792. The Quartets, for instance, are each specifically modelled after three Violin Sonatas Mozart published in 1781 – K 296, 379 and 380 – and Beethoven would later draw upon this familiarity in the composition of several of his own Violin Sonatas.

Second, a number of more substantial and original works were written after Beethoven moved to Vienna and commenced studies with the famed Austrian composer and leading musical figure of the period, Joseph Haydn. As the 1790s progressed, his mastery of the Viennese style became increasingly clear, and his works became more and more experimental, especially in genres like the piano sonata. By the period 1798–1802, his piano sonatas had become increasingly more experimental, but his Op. 18 string quartets and 1st symphony are more conservative than the sonatas, probably a symptom of his relative inexperience in composing in these genres in comparison to the piano sonata.

=== Bonn period ===
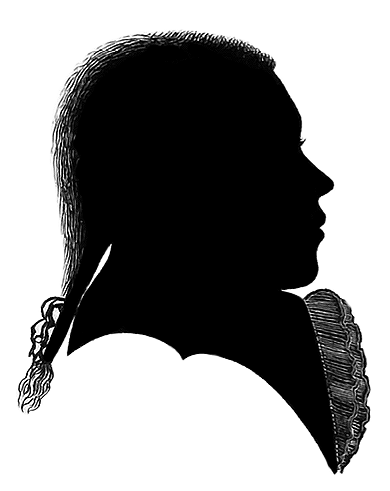
Silhouette image made of Beethoven when he was sixteen. He wears the uniform and wig suited to his employment as a court musician in Bonn.

With the exception of a visit to Vienna in 1787, Beethoven lived in Bonn until 1792, where he worked in the court chapel of the Elector of Cologne. His stints in the court chapel exposed him to a wide variety of musical style, not just from Vienna, but also from Venice and Rome. In addition to this, he played the viola in the orchestra of the Bonn Court Theatre from 1789, which exposed him to operas like Mozart's The Marriage of Figaro. Some forty compositions from this period are extant, including ten early works written by the young adolescent Beethoven when he was being promoted as a child prodigy performer and published as a result of the efforts of his teacher. It has been suggested that Beethoven largely abandoned composition between 1785 and 1790, possibly because his superiors in the palace chapel and court theatre did not compose music for the court, and thus not providing an example for the young Beethoven, and also because of negative critical reaction to his first published works. A 1784 review in Johann Nikolaus Forkel's influential Musikalischer Almanack compared Beethoven's efforts to those of rank beginners. Whatever the case, most of Beethoven's earliest surviving works were written after he turned twenty, between 1790 and 1792. Some of this music was later published by Beethoven, or incorporated into later works. As such, they provide an important foundation for judging the later evolution of his style.

Beethoven's early publications have been notable for scholars because of the view that it already indicated success as a child composer. One assessment stated that "if a child composer managed only a single published item, this might not indicate much, but if they had at least two publications, this is far more significant, for it suggests that the first one had had some success." Beethoven's childhood compositions had been published until 1784. An account cited how, by age thirteen, the child prodigy was already established, having composed three sonatas and four small works in addition to the earlier work called Dressler Variations. This is significant because, at this point, he no longer needed to be taught by a tutor, who would have influenced his musical style.

In general, Beethoven's earliest compositions show his struggles to master the prevailing classical style, both in structural and idiomatic terms. Several works, including two he later published, show the incipient signs of his later individual style: twelve Lieder, several of which he published in 1805 as Opus 52, his Wind Octet, later published as Opus 103, and several sets of Variations, including one (WoO 40) for violin and piano on Mozart's aria "Se vuol ballare" (later reworked in Vienna). Although these works largely conform to the formal conventions of the classical style, including strict observance of form and, in the variations, the decorative filigree associated with the genre, they also show early signs of Beethoven's later tendency to the more substantive treatment of thematic material.

Beethoven also produced numerous fragments of larger-scale works, including a symphonic movement (also written in C minor), a violin concerto, an oboe concerto, an early draft of his B♭ Piano concerto (both now vanished), and a concertante for piano, flute and bassoon. Scholars generally regard these early efforts as bland and uninspired and have concluded that his first efforts at writing in the classical sonata style (with the exception of his Wind Octet) were poorly conceived. Gustav Nottebohm, for example, wrote of Beethoven's Dressler Variations (WoO 63), "they show not a trace of contrapuntal independent part-writing. They are figural variations of the simplest kind". Téodor de Wyzewa considered his early "Kurfürsten Sonatas" written in 1783 (WoO 47) as merely "correct imitations of Haydn.".

The most ambitious work that Beethoven composed during his Bonn years was a funeral cantata to commemorate the death of Emperor Joseph II, commissioned by the literary society of Bonn. Though it was not performed, it was evidently impressive enough that Beethoven was commissioned to write a second cantata 'On the Accession of Leopold II to the Imperial Dignity', which was again not performed. These works already show skill in choral writing, as well as in writing arias, the latter also exhibited by three concert arias he composed around this time.

Considered as a whole, Beethoven's compositional efforts in Bonn demonstrate the importance of his move to Vienna in terms of the development of his musical style and the sophistication of his grasp of classical form and idiom, for his efforts in the sonata style are less accomplished than his efforts in other genres like variations, Lieder, and large vocal-orchestral pieces.

=== Early Vienna Period ===
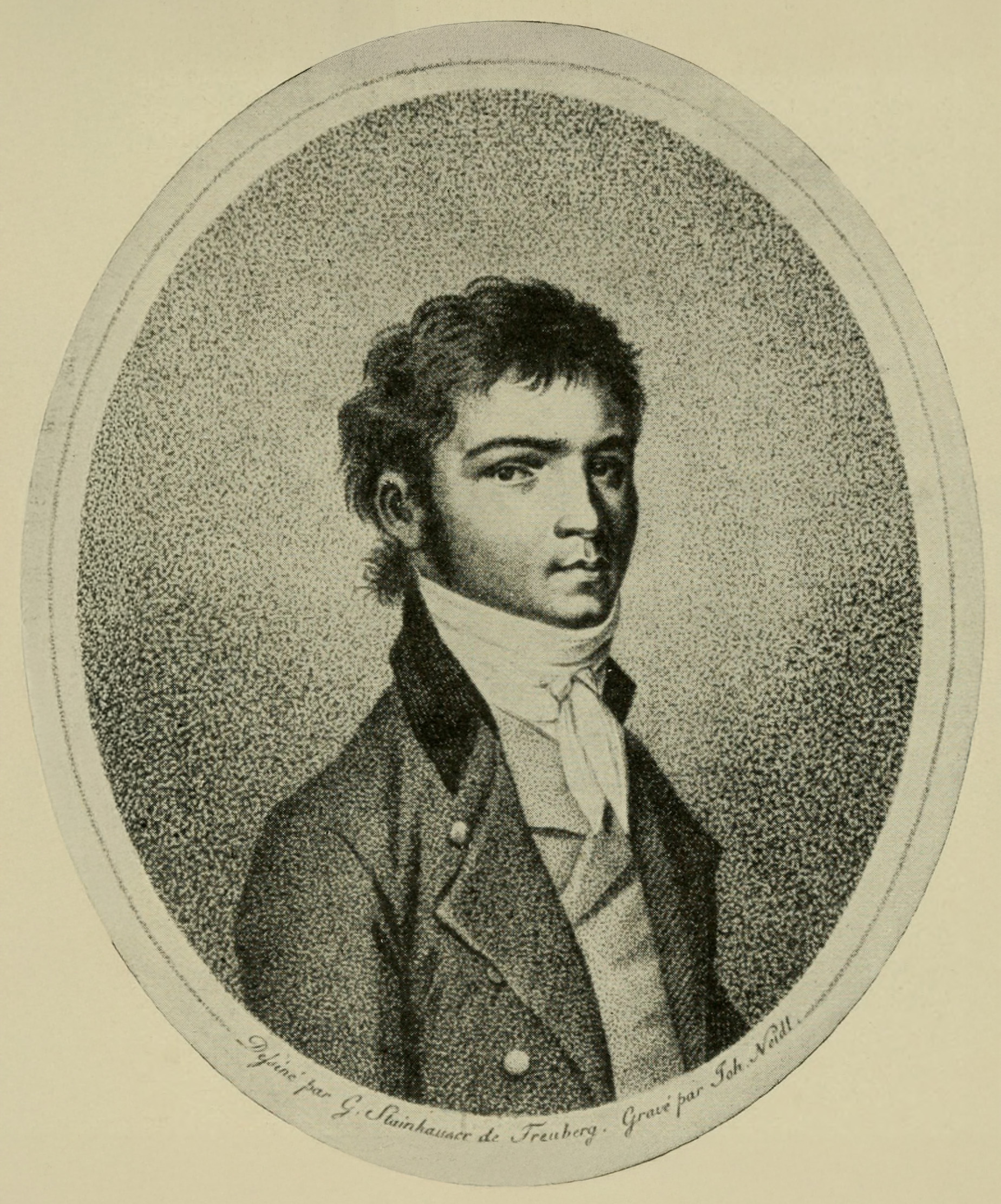
1801 engraving by Johann Joseph Neidl after a now-lost portrait by Gandolph Ernst Stainhauser von Treuberg, ca. 1800

For the first years after moving to Vienna, Beethoven composed considerably less than he did either before or after. Not only was he studying with Haydn and Albrechtsberger, but he was also revising several of his Bonn works to cater to Viennese styles and tastes. However, by 1795–96, Beethoven had started developing a style which not only displayed an increasing mastery of the Viennese style but also contained a dramatic flair which became a quintessential feature of his music. It was the piano that often served as a catapult for Beethoven's innovations, in works such as his Op. 1 piano trios and Op. 2 piano sonatas. These works expand the three-movement sonata form found in the sonatas of Mozart and Haydn to four-movements, which is more often associated with orchestral symphonies rather than chamber works or piano sonatas. In particular, the first movement of his first piano sonata displays an intensity in musical construction that foreshadows the motivic development he would later exploit in his 3rd and 5th symphonies, while the Piano Trio in C minor (from the Op. 1 set) had such an intensity of expression that Haydn thought that they would not be understood by the public. In addition, these works also display virtuosity which would become another of Beethoven's characteristics, particularly in his piano sonatas and chamber works. Beethoven also incorporated textures typical of chamber music and orchestral and vocal music into his piano works, often employing elaborate figuration and a use of trills, features of his piano music which would be apparent even in his late period.

Beethoven also developed a penchant for the key of C minor which would last for the rest of his life. Most of his full-scale works in minor keys from this period are in the key, including the 'Pathétique' sonata (the 1st movement of which was novel in its integration of the slow introduction into the overall sonata form), and the key became associated with extreme drama in Beethoven's works. Beethoven also seemed to have an interest in all current musical genres, including three piano concertos (the 2nd, in B♭ major, being a revised version of a piano concerto from his Bonn years), some violin and cello sonatas, and the Op.18 string quartets. The latter illustrates Beethoven's increasing interest in 'motivic saturation' (in the first movement of the 1st quartet in F major) and juxtaposition of strikingly different moods (in the Finale of the 6th quartet in B♭ major, subtitled 'La malinconia'), the latter of which is a precursor to similar explorations in his late period.

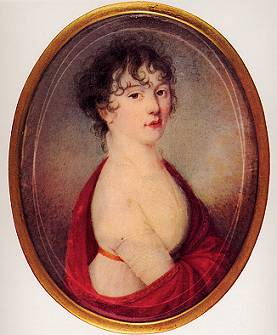
Julie Guicciardi, to whom Beethoven dedicated the "Moonlight" Sonata

Beethoven became increasingly more experimental in his use of form in his piano sonatas of 1800–02. Op. 26 in A♭ major contains a 'marcia funebre' which foreshadows that of the 'Eroica' symphony; Op. 27, no. 2 in C♯ minor 'Quasi una fantasia' (the famous 'Moonlight' sonata) has the dramatic sonata form movement come last instead of first, and Op. 31, No. 3 in E♭ major contains both a scherzo and a minuet, sacrificing a slow movement. This formal experimentation furthered his incorporation of differing moods into the sonata style that had already been seen in the finale of Op. 18, No.6; the most striking of which is contained in the first movement of Op. 27, no.2. From this point all of Beethoven's pieces display a "striking individuality", perhaps because of the integration of these Romantic moods within a Classical approach towards form. Emblematic of this approach was Beethoven's extension of the tonal range of the Classical sonata into mediant and submediant keys, instead of the dominant key as Mozart and Haydn had done, as seen in the first movement of Op. 31, no. 1 (in this case both B major and B minor, in comparison to the tonic of G major). These mediant and submediant keys acted as a substitute for the dominant key, creating a long-range dissonance against the tonic and creating tension that would be resolved with a move toward the tonic at the central climax of the movement. This expansion of the modulatory possibilities of sonata form would continue into the middle period, though the experiments in form would be sidelined in favour of the 'symphonic ideal', instead returning in his late period.

Despite his experiments in the piano sonatas and chamber works, his larger-scale works were more conservative. The First Symphony has been described as "wilt[ing] when... examine[d]... for clues to future symphony greatness." though it has also been praised for its "extraordinary cohesion" The Second Symphony is more accomplished and bigger in scope; though still conservative in comparison to the piano sonatas composed at the same time; despite this, it has been described as "the longest and most powerful symphony ever written... at the time of its composition." Its use of a unifying motive (a rise from F# to G) foreshadows the emergence of the 'germ motive' in the symphonic works of the middle period, while the increased scope of the symphony suggests Beethoven had finally grasped how he could use the orchestra in a way where he could start to incorporate the formal and expressive advances seen in his piano sonatas and chamber works of the time.

== Middle period ==
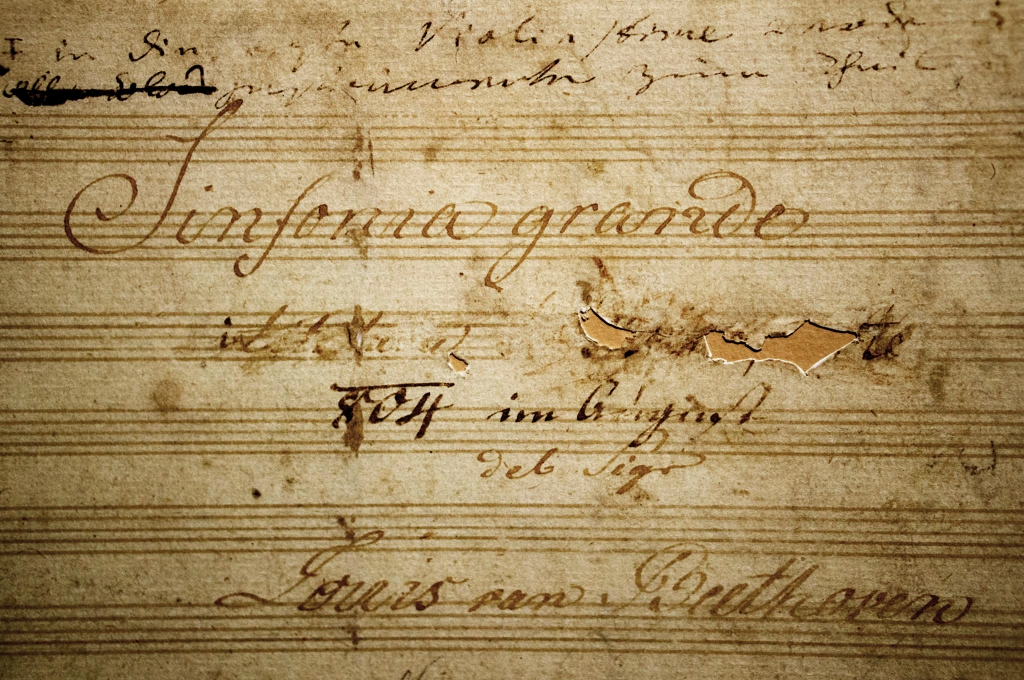
Title page of Eroica symphony

Beethoven's middle period is characterised by the increased scope of his compositions, a byproduct of further focus on large public works which often display elements of extra-musical sources. This increased scope "create[s] the impression of a psychological journey or growth process [where] something seems to arrive or triumph or transcend." A pivotal work of the period is the 3rd Symphony, nicknamed Eroica. He achieves this increased scope through his creation of large, extended structures characterised by the extensive development of musical material, themes, and motifs, as well as the development of long-range tonal dissonances that are resolved on the scale of entire movements (or even whole symphonies). The 1st movement of the Eroica is an example of this; the introduction of a chromatic C# at the beginning of the movement creates massive tonal instability that not only marks the first movements but the other movements as well. These structures often amount to a "projection of the underlying principles of the sonata style on the scale of the total four-movement work", instead of only the first movement in sonata form. So extensive were these structures as first employed in the Eroica that Beethoven did not write another work of such scale for many years afterwards, and in any case, many of these increasingly large scale works, such as the Eroica and the Rasumovsky string quartets met with an initially mixed reception.

In the development section of the Eroica's first movement's sonata form, the 1st theme is transformed into a variant which is often analysed as an entirely different theme. This use of a 'germ motive' also appears in works like the Waldstein sonata and 5th symphony, and is emblematic of his approach to musical architecture during his middle period. The 5th symphony is particularly renowned for the opening theme of its first movement, which takes the 'motivic saturation' previously seen in the 1st String Quartet's opening movement to extreme lengths, appearing in virtually every bar of the movement. The theme is even incorporated into the other movements, albeit modified, often by exploiting the rhythmic ambiguity of the motif. This feature can be seen even in overtly extra-musical works such as the Pastoral symphony, where the birdsongs at the end of the second movement are motivically linked to earlier passages of the movement.

In fact, another feature of Beethoven's middle-period is in the incorporation of these extra-musical ideas, whether it be the programmatic material of the Pastoral Symphony, or the heroic implications of the 'Eroica' title of the 3rd Symphony. The former is noted for its incorporation of the ostensibly opposing 'pastoral' and 'symphonic' styles: the former being "gentle and static", the latter "energetic and dynamic". Its five movements also sets it apart from the normal four movement symphonic work; each movement features and musically evokes a title suggestive of a feature of the countryside. Extra-musical ideas of heroism are implict in the Waldstein and Appassionata sonatas, as well as the Rasumovsky quartets, which explain the emphasis on lengthier, more developmental forms in these solo/chamber works. The sonatas use the key symbolism that characterises Beethoven's opera Fidelio, the original version of which was composed in 1805, around the same time of these sonatas. The Rasumovsky quartets also show for the first time Beethoven's interest in folk song, particularly in the third quartet of the set, where the Andante movement is written in Beethoven's conception of a Russian idiom. The Pastoral symphony also incorporates many features of folk style suggestive of the countryside, such as drones, and an Alpine horn call.

Much of Beethoven's music of this period further incorporates remote modulations to chromatic mediant keys (e.g. in the Waldstein sonata), rather than focusing on tonic-dominant relationships prevalent in the works of Mozart, Haydn, and Beethoven himself up to this point. This not only provides more opportunity for him to develop his motives but also gives his works an added urgency (especially in his sonata form movements). The 4th symphony begins with a slow introduction in the tonic minor, with suggestions of B minor and other keys, only reaching a firm B♭ major in bar 43. Chromatic mediant modulations also find long-range use in the 7th symphony; the keys of C major and F major that are introduced in the slow introduction of the first movement finding regular use in the symphony as a contrast to the tonic key of A major. Other remote key relations are found in the large-scale exploitation of Neopolitian sixths in the Appassionata sonata and in the String Quartet, op. 95, the latter of which foreshadows the style of the late quartets.

In his orchestral music, Beethoven achieves a "sheer variety and extreme range of color, texture, and sound" that, for the most part, are achieved without enlarging the orchestral forces used by Haydn and Mozart. However, in works such as the 3rd, 5th, and 6th symphonies, Beethoven does use larger orchestras. Beethoven moves the centre of the sound downwards in the orchestra, to the violas and the lower register of the violins and cellos, giving his music a heavier and darker feel than that of his two immediate predecessors. This may have been influenced by French post-revolutionary music, such as operas by Cherubini, as can be seen in the 'March Funebre' in the Eroica symphony. He expanded the range of the orchestra adding instruments such as the piccolo and contrabassoon in his 5th symphony, and the separation of the cello and double bass in the 3rd and 5th symphonies, which helped express the "heroic ideals" found in much of the music in this period. Midway through the 4th movement of the Pastoral symphony, the introduction of the piccolo and trombones, not previously heard in the work, help to depict the chaos of the raging storm. This particular use of the trombones may have been inspired by a similar 'storm' passage in Haydn's The Seasons, and the use of the contrabassoon and piccolo in the 5th and 6th symphonies also have precedent in that oratorio as well as Haydn's The Creation. Beethoven also started expanding the roles of certain instruments. In the Eroica symphony, he increases the number of horns to three, providing a rich timbre that is strikingly used in the trio of the 3rd movement. Beethoven also started to expand the role of the timpani in this period, giving the instrument solos in the first and second movements of the 4th symphony, and famously at the beginning of the Violin Concerto. In the finale of the 8th symphony, he tuned the timpani in octaves instead of the typical 4th or 5th, in order to further the coherence of the work as a whole.

== Late period ==
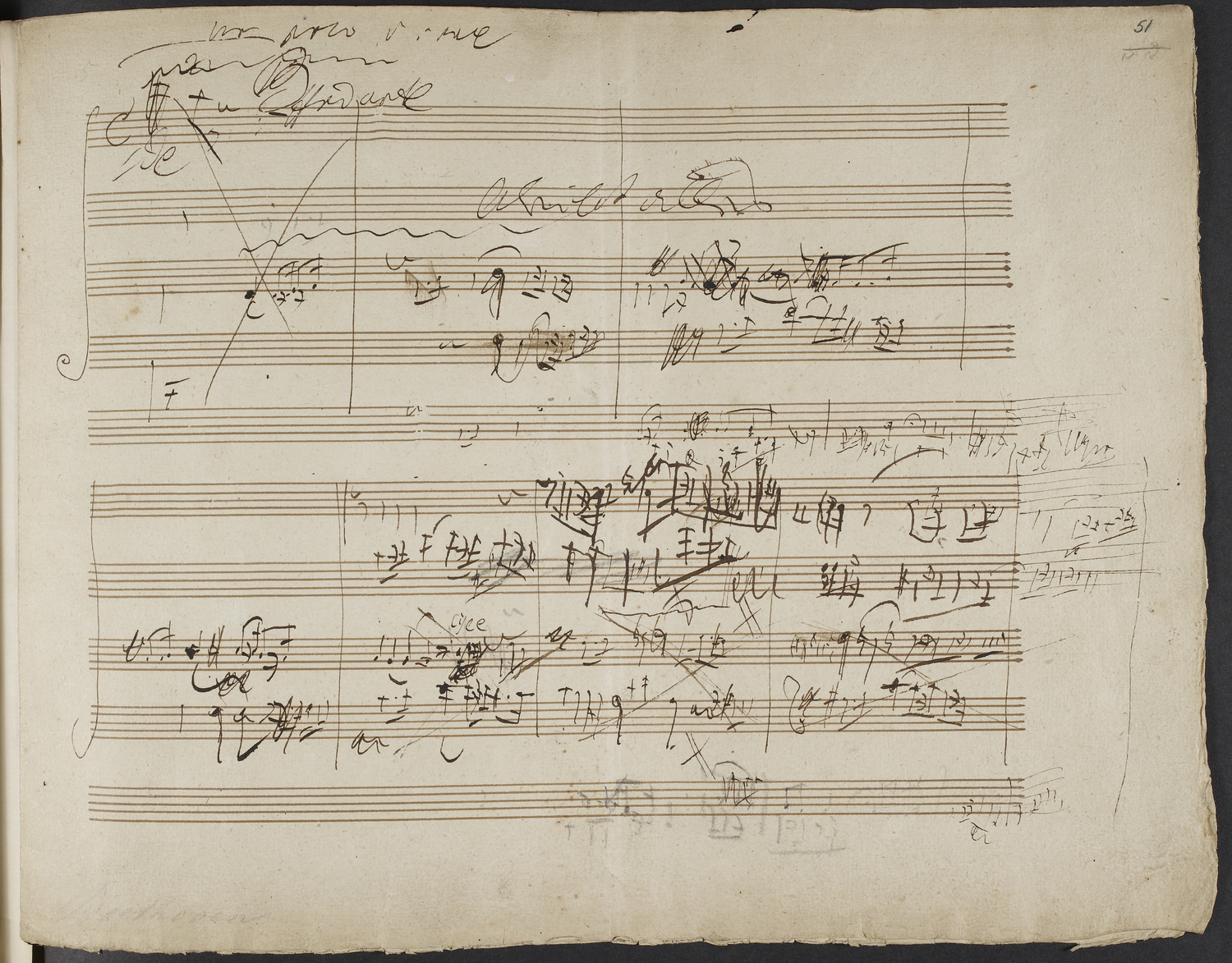
Sketches for String Quartet Op. 131

After 1814, Beethoven's output dropped considerably due to turmoil in his personal life, creative exhaustion after 10 years of near-constant musical activity, and the challenge of sustaining the Classical style while contemporaries like Rossini and Weber were moving towards the Romantic style. This resulted in a stylistic change in Beethoven's work, but his continued adherence to the Classical forms he loved meant that the influence of these late works only became apparent after the time of his own younger contemporaries. This stylistic change has been described by Charles Rosen as a "contraction or even a distillation of classical procedure rather than an expansion [of it]," and this manifests itself in a "more direct and intimate mode of communication." Theodor Adorno went further, stating:

"Everywhere in his formal language [during his late period] ... one finds formulas and phrases of convention scattered about. The works are full of decorative trill sequences, cadences, and fioraturas. Often convention appears in a form that is bald, undisguised, [and] untransformed."

Beethoven became more concerned with lyricism in this period. Although his melodic skills have been criticised, Beethoven previously utilised immensely lyrical melodies, and during his middle period, developed a hymn-like melodic style in his slow movements. This was intensified in his late period and was combined with a newfound "intimacy and delicacy" which was already apparent in works like the Piano Sonata in A major, Op. 101.

Beethoven also arranged 150 folksongs for the editor George Thomson during this time. Many melodies reminiscent of folksong appear in his late works, especially in his song-cycle An die ferne Geliebte, which was a great influence on the next generation of composers. These works largely departed from the Classical style. This incorporation of vocal forms also manifested in the setting of Friedrich Schiller's 'Ode to Joy' in the finale of the Ninth Symphony, this time being carrying symbolism of universal brotherhood. Another aspect of this is frequent use of recitative and arioso in instrumental works like the Piano Sonata in A♭ major, Op. 110, and the 'beklemmt' passage in the Cavatina of the String Quartet in B♭ major, Op. 130.

In addition, Beethoven also had an immense interest in variation form in this period. In his early Vienna period, variation movements in large works are infrequent; while they become more frequent in his middle period generally they are of the progressively more decorative variety. However, starting with the Piano Sonata in E major, Op. 109, Beethoven started redefining the form, resulting in variations which take on more individual and radical reinterpretations of the original themes. The variations did not merely vary the theme, they transformed it or played with its fundamentals, as seen in some variations in the Diabelli Variations. Paradoxically, this emphasis on the fundamentals on a theme resulted in both a progressive simplification of Beethoven's conception of the theme as the variations go on, even if the textures become increasingly complex. These suggest Beethoven's changing view of musical unity, from a dialogue between contrasting elements to a gradual evolution from within.

Beethoven also developed a great interest in contrapuntal forms in this period, including fugal sections or even full-scale fugues in most of his major works. The fugal sections are often embedded in the development sections of sonata form movements, as in the 1st movement of the Hammerklavier sonata, or become full movements unto themselves, as in the 4th movement of the Hammerklavier or the Grosse Fuge. These full-scale fugues are often a series of variations on the fugue theme itself. In effect, Beethoven integrates the fugue within the sonata style by emphasising its potential for thematic development, while also using it as a means to infuse drama into these works. Often these replace obvious uses of the dominant in this function, a process also reinforced by his increased use of 6/4 chords and experimentation with the church modes.

Beethoven also looked increasingly to the past in this period. Much of his older material was published or reworked into new works, as happened in the Bagatelles, Op. 119. He increased use of strict counterpoint and modes, often looking back to the academic exercises he did with Albrechtsberger, and he became interested in the music of Palestrina, Bach, and Handel. Even the 9th symphony represented a resumption of the 'symphonic ideal' that had lay dormant in his music for a decade by the time he wrote the work in the early 1820s, and the choral finale shows the influence of revolutionary French cantatas. Even the last work he completed, the Op. 135 String Quartet, has been said to be an exercise in "Classical nostalgia." Charles Rosen argued that, in his late period, Beethoven found new ways of exploiting old conventions in the classical style to produce thematic unity in works like the Piano Sonata in A♭ major, Op. 110. Beethoven also sought to integrate variations, fugue, and lyricism into the sonata style he had cultivated through his career. Perhaps the most important indication of his adherence to the Classical aesthetic is the musical unity he constantly strives for, even while moving away from the conventional sonata style (most of his late string quartets have more than 4 movements, sometimes as many as 7).

During his late period, Beethoven expanded his use of the 'germ motive' beyond all previous conception. For example, the entire Hammerklavier sonata is based on the idea of a descending 3rd, as well as the conflict between the tonic B♭ and B natural. The entire development section of the 1st movement, as well as the Scherzo theme of the 2nd movement, use persuasive descending 3rds, and the 3rd movement begins in F♯ minor, a 3rd away from the tonic key of the whole sonata. To some extent, this is an extension of Beethoven's substitution of dominant for the mediant/submediant that was already present in his early and middle periods, but the degree to which the Hammerklavier sonata depends on the idea is new. Similarly, the 'Ode to Joy' theme of the finale of the 9th symphony is foreshadowed in the first three movements, and the long instrumental introduction of the finale is also paralleled in the first three movements.

== Criticism ==
Many of Beethoven's late works were not initially well received: Beethoven's student Carl Czerny, for instance, wrote in 1852 about ‘when Beethoven's deafness began to have a disturbing effect on his compositions’, which supposedly affected many of the late works. The Ninth Symphony attracted particular criticism: Richard Taruskin observed that the only musicians who defended Beethoven's Ninth Symphony were those for whom this work fit into their broader artistic project, chief among whom was Richard Wagner. Other composers, most notably Mendelssohn, Spohr, Brahms, and Schumann, were highly critical, particularly of the inclusion of the choir in the finale of the Ninth.

In his book The Joy of Music, Leonard Bernstein, who, in his television documentary Bernstein on Beethoven admitted that he considered Beethoven the greatest composer who ever lived, nevertheless criticized his orchestration as sometimes being "downright bad", with "unimportant" orchestral parts being given too much prominence. Bernstein attributed this to Beethoven's ever-increasing deafness, which presumably rendered him incapable of judging how much louder than another a given instrument might be playing at certain moments. He repeated some of this criticism in the 1982 miniseries Bernstein/Beethoven, a PBS miniseries containing performances of all nine symphonies, several overtures, one of the string quartets, and the Missa solemnis. But at the same time, Bernstein added that what makes Beethoven great is his perfect sense of form – his ability to realize what the next note always had to be.
