= Artur Schnabel's recordings of Beethoven's piano sonatas =

1932–1935 recordings by Artur Schnabel

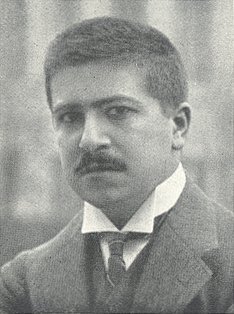
Artur Schnabel, 1906

Austrian pianist Artur Schnabel was the first pianist to record all of Ludwig van Beethoven's 32 piano sonatas. The recordings were made in Abbey Road Studios in London on a C. Bechstein grand piano from 1932 to 1935, seven years after electrical recording was invented. Originally recorded on 78 rpm phonograph records for the His Master's Voice label, they have been reissued numerous times on LP and CD.

In 1932, His Master's Voice launched the Beethoven Society (sometimes referred to as the Beethoven Sonata Society) whose objective was to issue recordings of Schnabel's recordings of the sonatas to advance subscribers. Although Schnabel refused to make recordings for years, he agreed to take on the project. It began in January 1932, when the Sonata No. 31 in A♭ major (Op. 110) was the first to be successfully recorded. The final recordings were made in November 1935, and the project culminated with Sonata No. 25 in G major (Op. 79). The Beethoven Society began distributing Schnabel's recordings in March 1932, issuing 12 volumes through 1937. Independently of the Beethoven Society series, Schnabel also recorded Sonata No. 30 in E major (Op. 109) and Sonata No. 32 in C minor (Op. 111) in 1942 for RCA Records, and the first movement of Sonata No. 14 in C♯ minor (Op. 27 No. 2) in 1947, which was never issued on record.

The recordings continue to draw universal recognition and have received numerous honors. In 1937, Gramophone wrote: "To [his] technical mastery Schnabel adds and fuses an intensely intelligent, not merely 'intellectual' mind ... The result is a perfectly blended interpretation of the music as a spiritual expression and as a musical organism." In 1986, Tim Page, writing in The New York Times, noted that Schnabel's "historic" recordings were "the standard by which all subsequent performances have been judged". In 2014, William Robin of The New Yorker wrote that Schnabel "remains the eminent Beethoven interpreter on record". The recordings were inducted into the Grammy Hall of Fame in 1975 and the National Recording Registry of the Library of Congress in 2018.

== Background ==
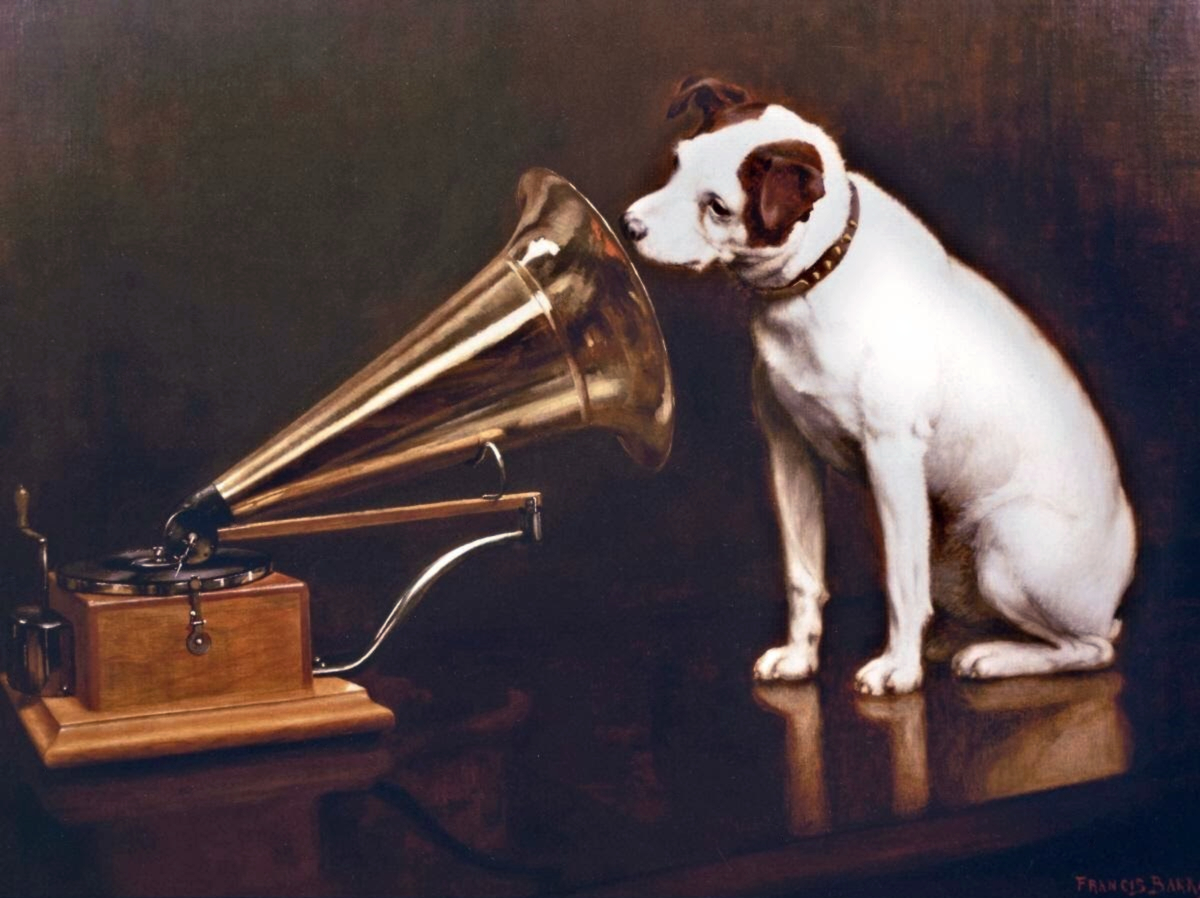
His Master's Voice logo

Austrian pianist and composer Artur Schnabel (17 April 1882 – 15 August 1951) is considered one of the 20th century's most important musicians, and continues to be celebrated particularly for his performances of Beethoven and Schubert. Proclaimed by American music critic, journalist, and music writer Harold C. Schonberg as "the man who invented Beethoven", Schnabel's pedagogical lineage included Beethoven himself. When he was around ten years old, he began studying with Theodor Leschetizky, who was a student of Carl Czerny, who was in turn Beethoven's student, close friend and assistant. In 1927, on the centenary of Beethoven's death, Schnabel performed all 32 Beethoven sonatas for the first time in a series of seven recitals at the theatre of the Volksbühne in Berlin. He performed the complete cycle three more times in his life; in London in 1934, at New York's Carnegie Hall in 1934, and at the Berliner Philharmonie from 1932 to 1933.

During his life, Schnabel witnessed the development of sound-reproduction technology, with the inventions of the player piano, radio, and phonograph record. In 1905 he recorded several reproducing piano rolls (rolls that included the artist's expressiveness as well as notes) on a Welte-Mignon, including works of Chopin, Bach, Schubert, Brahms, Weber, and Josef Strauss. They were his first known recordings. A few weeks later, he wrote in the Welte Autograph Book: "With the artistic excellence of the Welte-Mignon, the extreme limits of possibility in the mechanical reproduction of music appear to have been reached. ... Instead of all traces of his art disappearing with the last note played, the Pianist has now the consoling certainty that his performances will survive him." About a year later, Ludwig Hupfeld placed another reproducing piano on the German market. Schnabel made several rolls for this new instrument, including a Chopin etude, a Schumann romance, and a Weber rondo. In 1922, as part of a contractual obligation, he made rolls for the American Piano Company's Ampico reproducing piano during his first American tour. In addition to works of Bach, Brahms, Schubert, and Weber, he recorded two pieces of Beethoven's.

Shortly after Schnabel's first performances of the Beethoven piano sonatas in Berlin’s Volksbühne, the Great Depression began, creating a drop in record sales. British record label His Master's Voice made plans to release "Society" recordings, where wealthier classical music consumers could obtain recordings of "works or groups of musical works that appeal in the first instance more cultivated than to the general musical taste" by advance subscription. In 1929 Schnabel was approached by Fred Gaisberg, the artists' representative of Gramophone Company, His Master's Voice's parent company, who proposed Schnabel record Beethoven's complete piano works. (Note: Some sources claim that the proposal just consisted of the thirty-two piano sonatas, while other sources claim that they consisted of the thirty-two piano sonatas and the five piano concertos. Irsay claims that Schnabel subsequently recorded the Bagatelles, Diabelli Variations, and other short compositions because the "project was so successful". However, Schnabel himself claimed that the proposal by Gaisberg was to record all of the works that Beethoven had written for the piano.) Before the proposal, Schnabel had refused to make recordings for years, claiming they went "against the very nature of performance, for the nature of performance is to happen but once, to be absolutely ephemeral and unrepeatable." However, he accepted the project, and the Beethoven Society was formed to administrate the records' sales.

In mid-January, Schnabel tested the gramophone for the first time. He reported that the tests produced records that were "ugly in sound" but "musically satisfactory", which Cesar Saerchinger noted was "a seemingly curious distinction for a man who was praised throughout his career for his beautiful tone." In early February, Schnabel signed his contract.

== Recording and production ==
Principal recording of the complete sonatas for His Master's Voice took place from January 1932 to November 1935, with touch-up recordings made to several sonatas in 1937. They were all recorded at Abbey Road Studios's Studio No. 3 with Schnabel playing a C. Bechstein grand piano. They were made on 78 rpm discs, with each side holding approximately four minutes of music; "suitable breaks in the music, where one side ends and the next begins, had to be carefully worked out". The first session was on 21 January 1932, when Piano Sonata No. 31 in A♭ major (Op. 110) was completed. Schnabel recorded two other sonatas that day, but problems related to the side-break placements prevented him from successfully completing them; they were finished later.

Schnabel was deeply distressed by the grueling recording process. In a letter to his wife dated March 26, 1932, he wrote

… This week was an ordeal, a torture chamber. “What does not kill me makes me stronger,” says Nietzsche. Hopefully (probably) this is true. I had no idea of how outrageous a process the recording on discs could be. Like slave drivers they burdened me with six hours of recording on a daily basis. I had to play pieces that were not included in the contract, but I had no time to prepare them. They thought I was always able to play all the Beethoven sonatas and concertos at the drop of a hat. Instead of refusing to do anything that was not prearranged, I let them, as usual, cajole me into doing it. … The act of violence against humans is mainly caused by the imperfection of the machine, which he has created. For example: one can only play for four minutes. In these four minutes sometimes 2000 or more keys are hit. If two of them are unsatisfactory you have to repeat all of the 2000. In the repeat the first faulty notes are corrected but two others are not satisfactory, so you must play all 2000 once again. You do it ten times, always with a sword of Damocles over your head. Finally you give up and 20 bad notes are left in it. I am physically and mentally too weak for this process and was close to a breakdown. I began to cry when I was alone in the street. Never before had I felt deeper loneliness. My conscience tortured me. Succumbing to evil, the betrayal of life, the marriage by death. It is perfect nonsense, totally unnatural. Depravity…

Concurrently with the sonatas, Schnabel recorded all five Beethoven piano concertos, under the baton of Sir Malcolm Sargent.
