= Piano sonatas (Beethoven) =

Piano sonatas written by Beethoven

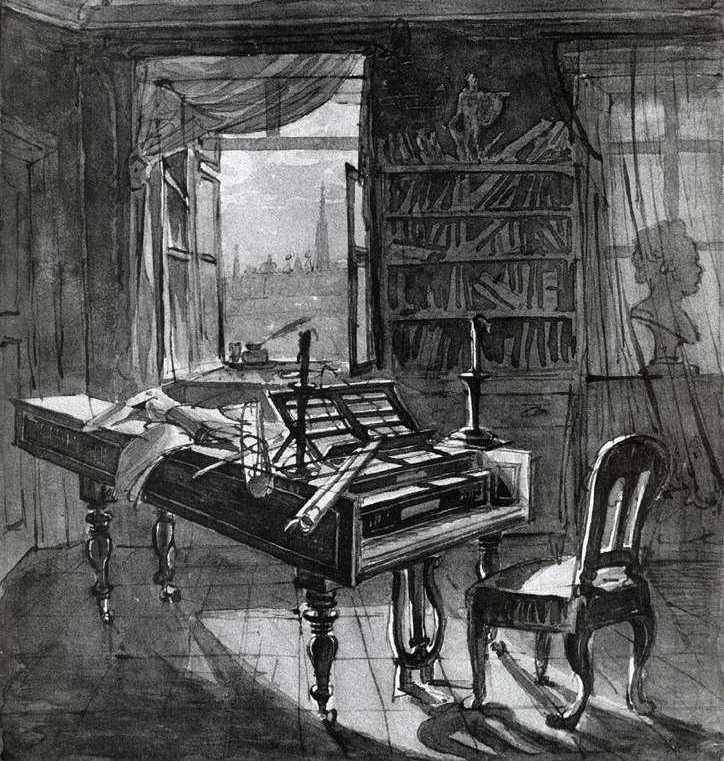
Detail from a picture depicting Beethoven's workroom in Schwarzspanierhaus, 1827

Ludwig van Beethoven wrote 32 mature piano sonatas between 1795 and 1822. (He also wrote 3 sonatas at the age of 13 along with several other unfinished piano works, including the unfinished sonata, WoO. 51.) Although originally not intended to be a meaningful whole, as a set they comprise one of the most important collections of works in the history of music. Hans von Bülow called them "The New Testament" of piano literature (Johann Sebastian Bach's The Well-Tempered Clavier being "The Old Testament").

Beethoven's piano sonatas came to be seen as the first cycle of major piano pieces suited to both private and public performance. They form "a bridge between the worlds of the salon and the concert hall". The first person to play them all in a single concert cycle was Hans von Bülow; the first complete recording is Artur Schnabel's recordings for the label His Master's Voice.

== List of sonatas ==
=== Bonn sonatas ===
The first three sonatas, written in 1782–1783, are usually not acknowledged as part of the complete set of piano sonatas because Beethoven was 13 when they were published.

- WoO 47: Three Piano Sonatas (composed 1782–3, published 1783)
  1. Piano Sonata in E♭ major
  2. Piano Sonata in F minor
  3. Piano Sonata in D major

=== Early sonatas ===
Beethoven's early sonatas were highly influenced by those of Haydn and Mozart. Piano Sonatas No. 1, 2, 3, 4, 7, 11, 12, 13, and 15 are four movements long, which was rather uncommon in his time.

- Opus 2: Three Piano Sonatas (1795)
  1. Piano Sonata No. 1 in F minor
  2. Piano Sonata No. 2 in A major
  3. Piano Sonata No. 3 in C major
- Opus 7: Piano Sonata No. 4 in E♭ major ("Grand Sonata") (1797)
- Opus 10: Three Piano Sonatas (1798)
  1. Piano Sonata No. 5 in C minor
  2. Piano Sonata No. 6 in F major
  3. Piano Sonata No. 7 in D major
- Opus 13: Piano Sonata No. 8 in C minor ("Pathétique") (1798)
- Opus 14: Two Piano Sonatas (1799)
  1. Piano Sonata No. 9 in E major (Also arranged by the composer for String Quartet in F major (Hess 34) in 1801)
  2. Piano Sonata No. 10 in G major
- Opus 22: Piano Sonata No. 11 in B♭ major (1800)
- Opus 26: Piano Sonata No. 12 in A♭ major (1801)
- Opus 27: Two Piano Sonatas (1801)
  1. Piano Sonata No. 13 in E♭ major 'Sonata quasi una fantasia'
  2. Piano Sonata No. 14 in C♯ minor 'Sonata quasi una fantasia' ("Moonlight")
- Opus 28: Piano Sonata No. 15 in D major ("Pastoral") (1801)

=== Middle sonatas ===
After he wrote his first 15 sonatas, he wrote to Wenzel Krumpholz, "From now on, I'm going to take a new path." Beethoven's sonatas from this period are very different from his earlier ones. His experimentation in modifications to the common sonata form of Haydn and Mozart became more daring, as did the depth of expression. Most Romantic period sonatas were highly influenced by those of Beethoven. After his 20th sonata, published in 1805, Beethoven ceased to publish sonatas in sets and published all his subsequent sonatas each as a single whole opus. It is unclear why he did so.

- Opus 31: Three Piano Sonatas (1802)
1. Piano Sonata No. 16 in G major
2. Piano Sonata No. 17 in D minor ("Tempest")
3. Piano Sonata No. 18 in E♭ major ("The Hunt")
- Opus 49: Two Piano Sonatas (composed 1795–6, published 1805)
  1. Piano Sonata No. 19 in G minor
  2. Piano Sonata No. 20 in G major
- Opus 53: Piano Sonata No. 21 in C major ("Waldstein") (1804)
  - WoO 57: Andante favori — Original middle movement of the "Waldstein" sonata (1804)
- Opus 54: Piano Sonata No. 22 in F major (1804)
- Opus 57: Piano Sonata No. 23 in F minor ("Appassionata") (1805)
- Opus 78: Piano Sonata No. 24 in F♯ major ("À Thérèse") (1809)
- Opus 79: Piano Sonata No. 25 in G major ("Cuckoo") (1809)
- Opus 81a: Piano Sonata No. 26 in E♭ major ("Les Adieux/Das Lebewohl") (1810)
- Opus 90: Piano Sonata No. 27 in E minor (1814)

=== Late sonatas ===
Beethoven's late sonatas were some of his most difficult works and some of today's most difficult repertoire. Yet again, his music found a new path, often incorporating fugal technique and displaying radical departure from conventional sonata form. The "Hammerklavier" was deemed to be Beethoven's most difficult sonata yet. In fact, it was considered unplayable until almost 20 years later, when Liszt played it in a concert.

- Opus 101: Piano Sonata No. 28 in A major (1816)
- Opus 106: Piano Sonata No. 29 in B♭ major ("Hammerklavier") (1818)
- Opus 109: Piano Sonata No. 30 in E major (1820)
- Opus 110: Piano Sonata No. 31 in A♭ major (1821)
- Opus 111: Piano Sonata No. 32 in C minor (1822)

== Performances and recordings ==
In a single concert cycle, the whole 32 sonatas were first performed by Hans von Bülow. A number of other pianists have emulated this feat, including Artur Schnabel (the first since Bülow to play the complete cycle in concert from memory), Roger Woodward, Rudolf Buchbinder and Michael Houstoun, who has performed the full sonata cycle twice; first at the age of 40, and then 20 years later in 2013. Claudio Arrau performed the cycle several times.

The first pianist to make a complete recording was Artur Schnabel, who recorded them for the British recording label His Master's Voice between 1932 and 1935. Other pianists to make complete recordings include Claude Frank, who was one of Artur Schnabel's students, Wilhelm Kempff, Claudio Arrau, Annie Fischer, Paul Lewis, Daniel Barenboim, Friedrich Gulda, Jean-Efflam Bavouzet, Mari Kodama, Alfred Brendel, Vladimir Ashkenazy, Maurizio Pollini, Richard Goode, Stephen Kovacevich, András Schiff, Russell Sherman, Igor Levit, Anton Kuerti, Eduardo del Pueyo, Konstantin Scherbakov, Boris Giltburg, Fazıl Say, Jenő Jandó, Rudolf Buchbinder, John Lill and others.
