= Late piano sonatas (Beethoven) =

Piano sonatas by Beethoven

The late piano sonatas of Ludwig van Beethoven usually refer to the last five piano sonatas the composer wrote during his late period.

- Piano Sonata No. 28 in A major, Op. 101
- Piano Sonata No. 29 in B♭ major, Op. 106 "Hammerklavier"
- Piano Sonata No. 30 in E major, Op. 109
- Piano Sonata No. 31 in A♭ major, Op. 110
- Piano Sonata No. 32 in C minor, Op. 111

Some compilations may include Piano Sonata No. 27 in E minor, Op. 90 as one of Beethoven's late piano sonatas.

== Recordings ==
Complete cycle:

- Claudio Arrau (Philips Classics)
- Vladimir Ashkenazy (Decca Classics)
- Wilhelm Backhaus (Decca Classics)
- Daniel Barenboim (3 recordings: 2 on Deutsche Grammophon, 1 on EMI Classics)
- Alfred Brendel (3 recordings: 2 on Philips Classics, reissued on Decca Classics; 1 earlier set on Vox, reissued by Brilliant Classics)
- Annie Fischer (Hungaroton)
- Claude Frank (Music and Arts)
- Walter Gieseking
- Seonuk Gim (Accentus Music)
- Richard Goode (Nonesuch)
- Glenn Gould (30—32 on Columbia Masterworks (1956); posthumous releases of 28 on CBC Records from a radio broadcast, and 29 on Sony Classical)
- Friedrich Gulda (3 recordings: 1 on Decca Classics; 1 on Amadeo Records, reissued on Brilliant Classics and Decca Classics; and one on Orfeo, first released in 2010)
- Éric Heidsieck (EMI Classics)
- Wilhelm Kempff (2 recordings on Deutsche Grammophon)
- Stephen Kovacevich (EMI Classics)
- Christian Leotta (ATMA Classique)
- Igor Levit (Sony Classics)
- John Lill (Resonance Records)
- HJ Lim (EMI Classics)
- Paul Lewis (Harmonia Mundi)
- Yves Nat (EMI Classics)
- Kun-Woo Paik (Decca Classics)
- Maurizio Pollini (Deutsche Grammophon)
- Sviatoslav Richter (various performances of each sonata on varying labels)
- Bernard Roberts (Nimbus)
- Charles Rosen (CBS, reissued on CD Sony Classics)
- András Schiff (ECM Records)
- Artur Schnabel (EMI Classics)
- Peter Serkin (Musical Concepts)
- Rudolf Serkin (Sony Classical)
- Solomon (EMI Classics)
- Mitsuko Uchida (Philips Classics)

Partial cycle (3 or more):

- Christoph Eschenbach (Nos. 29–32 on EMI Classics)
- Emil Gilels (Nos. 28–31 on Deutsche Grammophon)

Of the five sonatas, the last one (in C minor) is the most often recorded, as heard in interpretations by Julius Katchen, Arturo Benedetti Michelangeli, Mikhail Pletnev, Ivo Pogorelić, and Anatol Ugorski.

== See also ==
- Piano sonatas (Beethoven)
- Diabelli Variations, another piano work composed during Beethoven's late period
- Bagatelles Op. 119 & Op. 126
- Schubert's last sonatas
