= Late Piano Sonatas =

The Late Piano Sonatas usually refer to the last set of piano sonatas a composer has composed during his late years or while nearing death:

- Late piano sonatas (Beethoven)
- Schubert's last sonatas
