= Christian Leotta =

Italian pianist

Christian Leotta (born 1980 in Catania, Italy) is an Italian virtuoso pianist. Leotta has performed and recorded all 32 Beethoven Piano Sonatas.

He began his study of piano at the age of 7, furthering his studies at the Milan Conservatory under Mario Patuzzi and is a former pupil of the pianist Karl Ulrich Schnabel. Leotta studied at the Theo Lieven International Piano Foundation and also with Rosalyn Tureck at the Tureck Bach Research Foundation at Oxford. He also studied at the Literature and Philosophy faculty of Milan State University. Leotta officially began his career in 2002 in Montreal at the age of 22 and began to perform the complete Beethoven Piano Sonatas, which he completed in a period of less than a month.
