= Symphony No. 2 (Szymanowski) =

Karol Szymanowski completed his Symphony No. 2 in B♭ major, Op. 19 in 1909 at the age of 27. Szymanowski was greatly influenced by German culture and the symphony has many echoes of Richard Strauss and Max Reger. This symphony introduced Szymanowski to Europe in 1911–1912, following its Warsaw premiere on 7 April 1911 and it was heard in Berlin, Leipzig and Vienna. The symphony was published soon after the composer's death after much revision. This symphony and its use of a solo violin laid the foundation, so to speak, of Szymanowski's first Violin Concerto. A typical performance of the symphony lasts about 30 minutes.

== Form ==
The symphony is supposed to show off the composer's prowess as a contrapuntalist. Its structure is loosely modelled on that of Beethoven's last piano sonata, an allegro first movement followed by a second movement consisting of a theme and set of variations. The work unconventional for its time, is in two movements and begins in a typical Szymanowski manner (also with a similarity to Scriabin) with a violin solo:

1. Allegro moderato — Grazioso
2. Tema — Variazioni — Fuga

The first movement in B♭ major has a passionate character to it.

The second movement in which Reger is explicitly invoked, is almost a self-contained movement with its own introduction. It consists of a theme and five variations. It is playful, festive and dance-like. The scherzo itself is a three-part structure based not only on the variation theme but also on the 1st movement's solo violin theme. The movement ends with a sixth variation followed by a fugue. Its model is probably the fugal finale of Strauss' Sinfonia domestica. Each subject in the fugue proves to be derived from earlier themes.

== Instrumentation ==
Szymanowski scored his symphony for a large orchestra consisting of standard instruments:

Woodwind
3 Flutes
3 Oboes or
(2 Oboes and 1 Cor anglais)
2 Clarinets in B
1 B♭ and 1 E♭ Clarinet or
(1 Bass Clarinet)
3 Bassoons

Brass
4 Horns in F
3 Trumpets in B
3 Trombones
Tuba

Percussion
Perc(3)
Harp

Strings
1st and 2nd Violins
Violas
Cellos
Contra basses

== Evaluation ==
Conductor Antoni Wit deems the symphony a very challenging work, explaining that when he is asked to conduct it he replies that the orchestra won't have it easy and the performance will require more work than usual and each musician to prepare its part before the rehearsals, but that nevertheless it will be worth it.
