= Bernstein/Beethoven =

11-part 1982/83 series by Leonard Bernstein conducting Beethoven

Bernstein/Beethoven is a 11-part miniseries featuring Leonard Bernstein, broadcast in 1982/1983 on PBS and A&E. As with most post-1969 Bernstein programs, it was directed by Humphrey Burton, who was, according to Schuyler Chapin, Bernstein's director of choice. It was nominated for an Emmy and won a CableACE Award. It was filmed largely on location in Vienna and Germany, and not only featured Bernstein but also actor Maximilian Schell, who not only provided commentary on Beethoven, but read from his letters.

The miniseries contains performances of all of Beethoven's symphonies as well as several overtures, a string quartet that Bernstein re-orchestrated for the entire string section of the Vienna Philharmonic, and the Missa Solemnis, all conducted by Bernstein. It also contains commentary by Bernstein about the music.

The entire miniseries has been issued by Deutsche Grammophon as a box set of 7 DVDs in 2008.
