= The Joy of Music =

1959 book by Leonard Bernstein

- Author: Leonard Bernstein
- Publisher: Simon & Schuster
- Publication date: 1959

The Joy of Music is Leonard Bernstein's first book, originally published as a hardcover in 1959 by Simon & Schuster. The first UK edition was published in 1960 by Weidenfeld & Nicolson. It was translated into German (1961), Danish (1969), Slovenian (1977), Hebrew (1973 and 1977), and Chinese (1987). The first edition was reprinted seven times and published in several further editions, including as a paperback and an ebook.

In the book's introduction, "The Happy Medium", Bernstein discusses the nature of music and the difficulties of writing about it.

The first part of the book, "Imaginary Conversations", is about Beethoven, the meaning in music, and the difficulty of writing popular tunes for serious composers.

A brief section, "Interlude: Upper Dubbing, Calif.", describes the peculiarities of composing film music. It was published on May 30, 1954, in The New York Times.

The second section includes seven scripts from the TV series Omnibus, three of which were previously published between 1956 and 1958 in Vogue. They contain sheet music examples to illustrate the lecture; the sound examples from the lectures and actions on stage are described in the form of stage directions.

1. "Beethoven's Fifth Symphony", broadcast November 14, 1954
2. "The World of Jazz", broadcast October 16, 1955
3. "The Art of Conducting", broadcast December 4, 1955
4. "American Musical Comedy", broadcast October 7, 1956
5. "Introduction to Modern Music", broadcast January 13, 1957
6. "The Music of Johann Sebastian Bach", broadcast March 31, 1957
7. "What Makes Opera Grand?", broadcast March 23, 1958

All seven of Bernstein's Omnibus lectures, introduced by Alistair Cooke, were released as a box set of four DVDs in 2016, so readers of The Joy of Music can hear the musical examples.
