= Three Piano Sonatas, WoO 47 (Beethoven) =

1782 - 1783 musical works

Three Piano Sonatas
- by Ludwig van Beethoven
- Catalogue: WoO 47
- Style: Classical period
- Composed: 1782–1783
- Dedication: Maximilian Friedrich
- Published: 1783
- Movements: Three each

The Three Piano Sonatas, WoO 47, were composed by Ludwig van Beethoven probably between 1782 and 1783, when he was between eleven and twelve years old. The sonatas show a certain level of precocity and serve as a precursor to the masterworks he later produced. They are dedicated to the Prince-elector (German: Kurfürst) Maximilian Friedrich and therefore also known as the Kurfürstensonaten.

== Overview ==
Like Mozart's, Beethoven's musical talent was recognized at a young age, and these three piano sonatas give an early glimpse of the composer's abilities, as well as his boldness. Beethoven was writing in a form usually attempted by older, more mature composers, as the sonata was a cornerstone of Classical piano literature. Since they were written at such an early age (and Beethoven himself did not assign them opus numbers), the works have historically been omitted from the canon of Beethoven's piano sonatas. However, Barry Cooper included the trio in his critical edition of the sonatas created for ABRSM, arguing that "A complete edition has to be complete, and if you ignore early works, you don't show the longer trajectory of the composer's development." The inclusion of these three works raises Beethoven's total number of piano sonatas from 32 to 35. (Note: With the incipit of a possible 36th identified by Thayer. A fragmentary work in D found in the Kafka Miscellany has been identified as a possible 37th.)

== The sonatas ==
=== No. 1 in E♭ major ===
1. Allegro cantabile (E♭ major)
2. Andante (B♭ major)
3. Rondo vivace (E♭ major)

The second theme of the first movement closely resembles part of the first, so that in the recapitulation the first theme can be omitted entirely without its absence being noticed. One of the main characteristics of Beethoven's thought is evident in this sonata: the development of a multitude of contrasting motifs and characters from a basic cell. The liveliness of the Rondo reveals Beethoven's evident pleasure in his own virtuosity.

Beginning of No. 1 in E♭ major

=== No. 2 in F minor ===
1. Larghetto maestoso – Allegro assai (F minor)
2. Andante (A♭ major)
3. Presto (F minor)

The musical ideas are individualized in this sonata, where the strongest emotions are expressed. In the conception of the time, the key of F minor is perceived as severe and passionate, and Beethoven would return to this character later, especially in the Sonatas Op. 2 No. 1 and Op. 57. The first movement, deeply Beethovenian, begins with a slow introduction that makes abundant use of contrasting registers. The appearance of the main theme through repetitions and the change of tempo to allegro already prefigure the Pathétique Sonata. The Presto, with its unison passages and its agitated lines, puts a passionate end to this remarkable work, written by a child.

Beginning of No. 2 in F minor

=== No. 3 in D major ===
1. Allegro (D major)
2. Menuetto – Sostenuto (A major)
3. Scherzando: Allegretto, ma non troppo (D major)

In the first movement the second theme is introduced as expected, in the dominant, but in the recapitulation it reappears after only four bars, and in the key of G major rather than D major, creating interesting ambiguities about its true status. The Menuetto has six variations, the fourth of which is technically difficult to play in minuet tempo. The composer again uses G major as a substitute for D major in part of the finale, thus establishing a large-scale tonal relationship of the kind normally associated with the mature Beethoven. The humorous sentiment suggested in the Scherzando was to become a regular feature of Beethoven's work.

Beginning of No. 3 in D major

== Recordings ==
The three sonatas have rarely been included in recorded collections of Beethoven's piano sonatas, according to critic Jerry Dubins. Emil Gilels, Jenő Jandó, Ronald Brautigam and Tamami Honma are among the pianists who have recorded them. The sets by Brautigam (BIS) and Honma (Divine Art, 2024) each present all 35 sonatas, and Honma's follows Barry Cooper's ABRSM critical edition, which includes them.

== See also ==
- List of compositions by Ludwig van Beethoven
