= Piano Sonata No. 27 (Beethoven) =

Piano Sonata by Ludwig van Beethoven

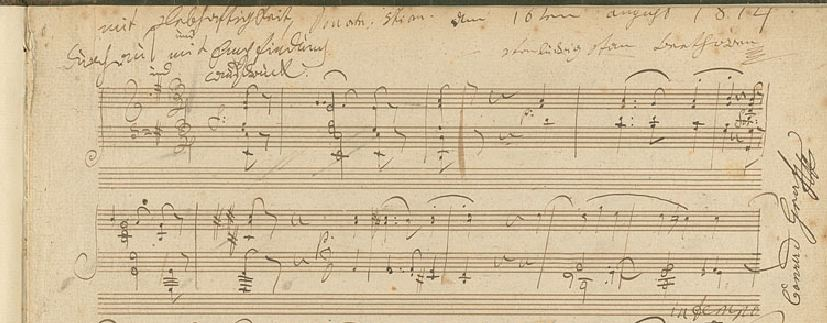
Opening bars as they appear in Beethoven's completed manuscript.

Ludwig van Beethoven's Piano Sonata No. 27 in E minor, Op. 90 was written in the summer of 1814—Beethoven's late Middle period—and dedicated to Prince Moritz von Lichnowsky, a friend and benefactor who was also the dedicatee of the Eroica Variations.

== History of composition ==
Beethoven's previous piano sonata, popularly known as Les Adieux, was composed almost five years before Op. 90. Beethoven's autograph survives and is dated August 16. The sonata was published almost a year later, in June 1815, by S. A. Steiner, after Beethoven made a few corrections. Beethoven's letter to Prince Moritz von Lichnowsky, sent in September 1814, explains the dedication:

I had a delightful walk yesterday with a friend in the Brühl, and in the course of our friendly chat you were particularly mentioned, and lo! and behold! on my return I found your kind letter. I see you are resolved to continue to load me with benefits. As I am unwilling you should suppose that a step I have already taken is prompted by your recent favors, or by any motive of the sort, I must tell you that a sonata of mine is about to appear, dedicated to you. I wished to give you a surprise, as this dedication has been long designed for you, but your letter of yesterday induces me to name the fact. I required no new motive thus publicly to testify my sense of your friendship and kindness.

Beethoven's friend and biographer Anton Schindler reported that the sonata's two movements were to be titled Kampf zwischen Kopf und Herz ("A Contest Between Head and Heart") and Conversation mit der Geliebten ("Conversation with the Beloved"), respectively, and that the sonata as a whole referred to Moritz's romance with a woman he was thinking of marrying. Schindler's explanation first appeared in his 1842 book Beethoven in Paris and has been repeated in several other books. Later studies showed that the story was almost certainly invented by Schindler, at least in part, and that he went so far as to forge an entry in one of Beethoven's conversation books to validate the anecdote.

== Form ==
I. Mit Lebhaftigkeit und durchaus mit Empfindung und Ausdruck

II. Nicht zu geschwind und sehr singbar vorgetragen
Performed by Artur Schnabel in 1932

Most of Beethoven's piano sonatas are in three or four movements, but this one has only two. Both are provided with performance instructions in German. A few of Beethoven's works of this period carried similar instructions in place of the traditional Italian tempo markings.

1. Mit Lebhaftigkeit und durchaus mit Empfindung und Ausdruck ("With liveliness and with feeling and expression throughout")
2. Nicht zu geschwind und sehr singbar vorgetragen ("Not too swiftly and conveyed in a singing manner")

The first movement, in E minor, is in 3/4 time. Its restless character has been noted by many commentators, including Donald Francis Tovey, who called it "full of passionate and lonely energy", and Charles Rosen, who wrote of its "despairing and impassioned" mood. The movement is in a sonata form in which the exposition is not repeated, and the development section is based almost entirely on the first subject. Pianist Andras Schiff hears Bach's influence in the "beautiful counterpoint" that unfolds in the following passage from the development:

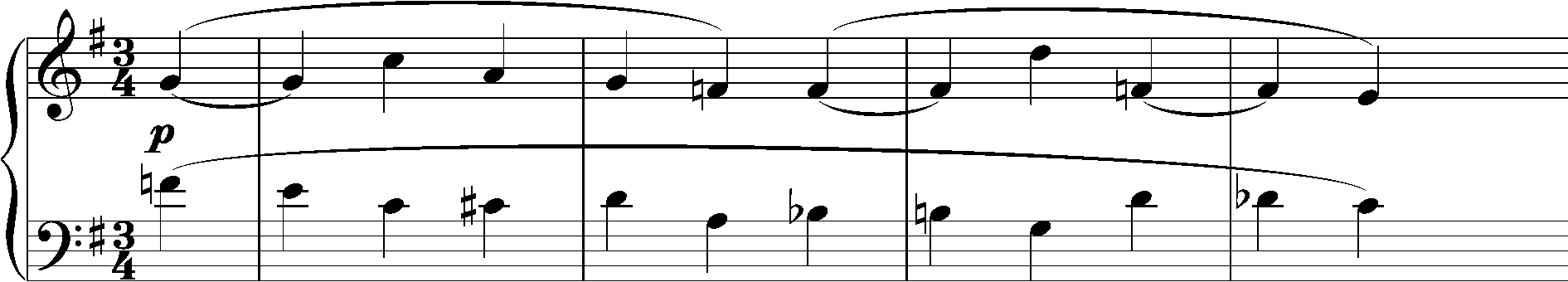
Beethoven Op. 90 first movement bars 110-113

The second movement is a gentle sonata-rondo movement in E major and 2/4 time. Its Romantic character, which foreshadows Schubert's style in particular, has long been noted by numerous musicians and musicologists, e.g. William Kinderman, Barry Cooper, and Rosen, who called the main melody "exquisitely beautiful" and one of Beethoven's most accomplished melodies.

According to Wilfrid Mellers, "Opus 90 belongs neither to [Beethoven’s] middle nor to his late phase. Denis Matthews sees the work as having "more claim to kinship with the great sonatas of the last period than to the previous ones." Hans von Bülow declared that this is the work "with which the series of pianoforte works of the Master’s so-called ‘last period’ begins." Schiff has drawn attention to the apparent connection between the ending of this sonata, which closes in the key of E:

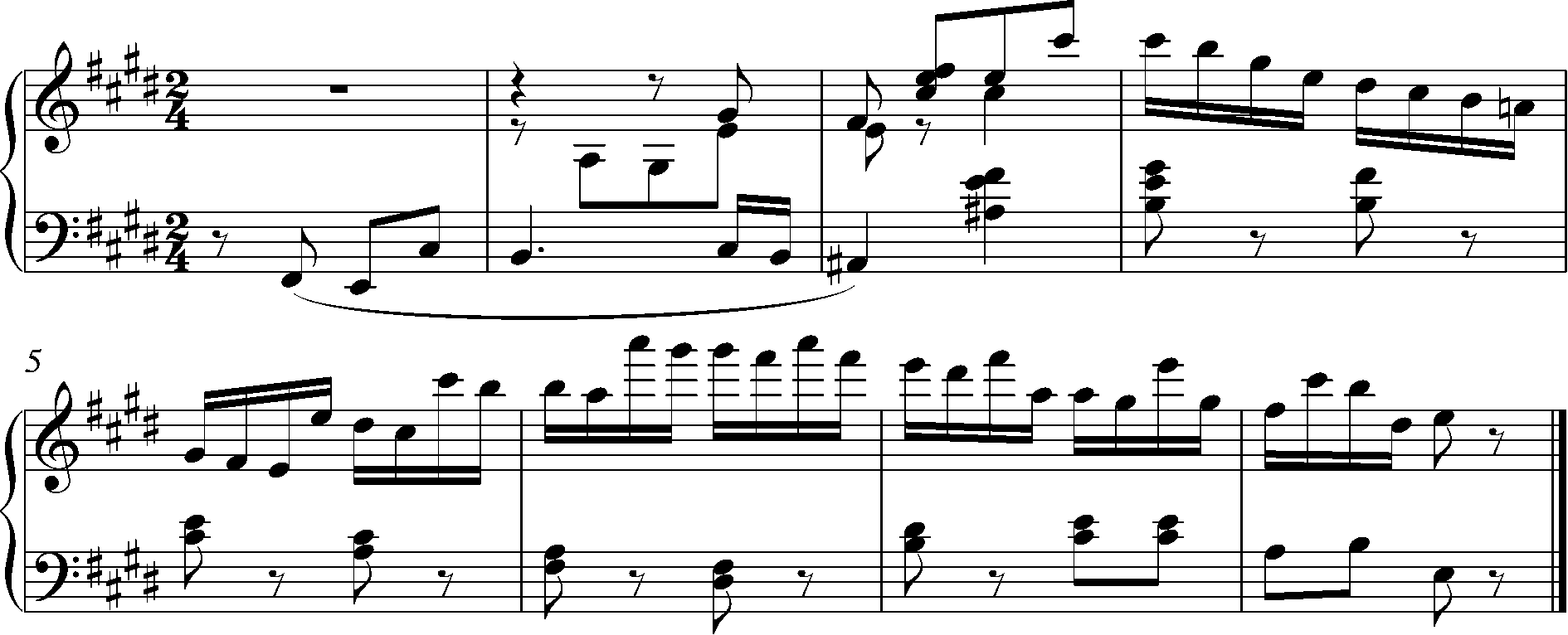
Beethoven, Piano Sonata No. 27, ending

and the E major chord that opens the Sonata in A major, Op. 101, composed in 1816:

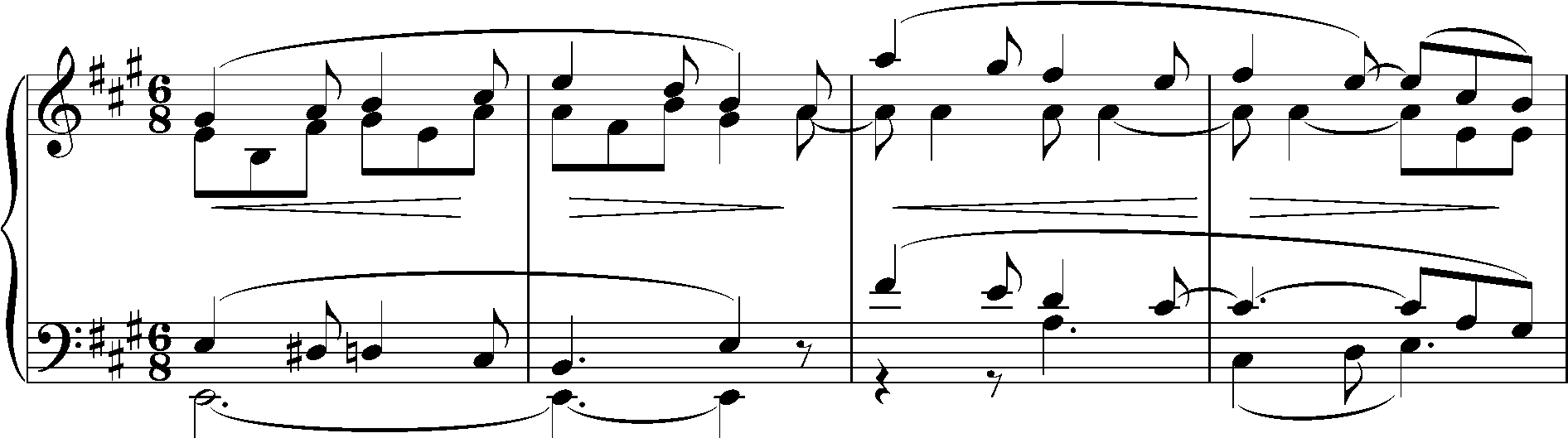
Beethoven Piano Sonata 28 beginning

Schiff remarked: "If I go into the next sonata it sounds like a continuation of the previous one."

A full performance of the sonata takes about 13–14 minutes. There are no repeats in either movement.

At the time Beethoven composed the sonata, the lowest note on the piano was an F_{1}. This posed a challenge for a work in the key of E, as the bass end of the instrument fell one semitone short of the tonic. Rosen argued that a performer on a modern piano should make alterations to Beethoven's score to use the low E_{1} that Beethoven could not.
