= William Kinderman =

American musicologist

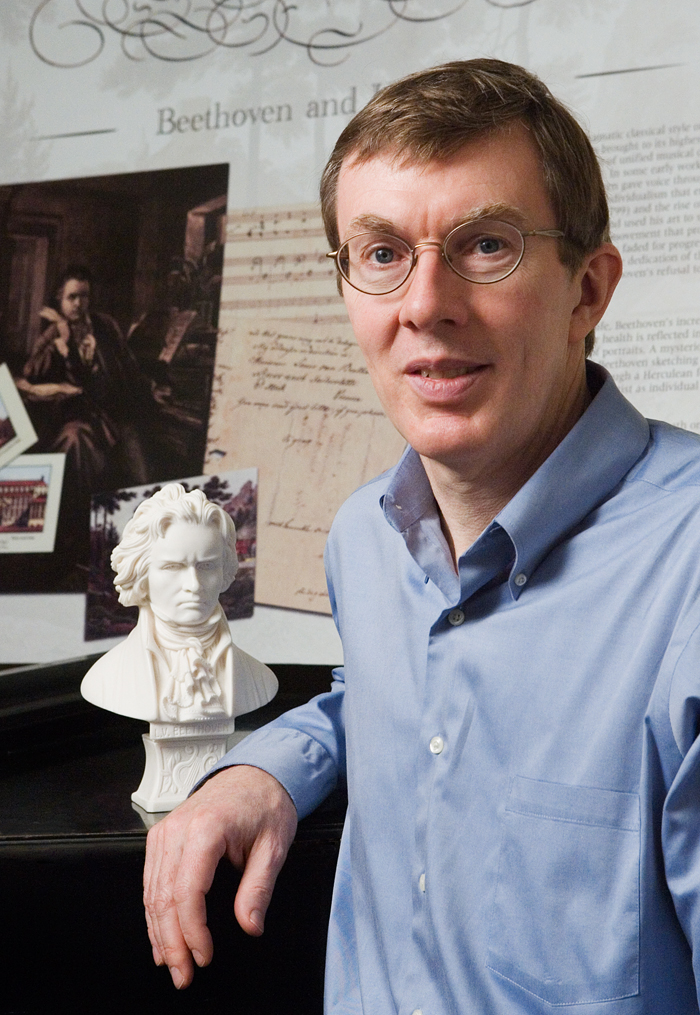
William Kinderman, 2009

William Andrew Kinderman (born 1 November 1952) is an American author and music scholar who plays the piano.

== Life ==
Born in Philadelphia, Kinderman studied music and philosophy at Dickinson College in Pennsylvania and later the same subjects at the University of Music and Performing Arts Vienna and the University of Vienna. He studied musicology at Yale University and the University of California, Berkeley. He held a professorship at the University of Victoria in British Columbia, Canada, has taught at the University of Illinois at Urbana-Champaign and currently is professor and inaugural Leo and Elaine Krown Klein Chair of Performance Studies, Herb Alpert School of Music, University of California, Los Angeles. His research focuses on Beethoven, Mozart, and Wagner. He has also written on the creative process in music, and on literary subjects including Thomas Mann. His composition for piano, Bee[t]h[ov]e[n], has received performances and recordings.

== Books ==
- Beethoven’s Diabelli Variations. Oxford: Clarendon Press, 1987 (Diss., Berkeley, Calif., University of California, 1980).
- Beethoven’s Compositional Process. University of Nebraska Press, Lincoln/Nebraska 1991.
- Beethoven. on Oxford University Press, 1995.
- The Second Practice of Nineteenth-Century Tonality. on University of Nebraska Press, Lincoln/Nebraska 1996.
- Artaria 195: Beethoven’s Sketchbook for the ‘Missa solemnis’ and the Piano Sonata in E Major, Opus 109. 3 volumes, University of Illinois Press, Urbana 2003 (with Katherine Syer).
- A Companion to Wagner’s Parsifal. Camden House, Rochester/New York 2005.

Beethoven: A Political Artist in Revolutionary Times. University of Chicago Press, 2020. German edition as Beethoven. Ein politischer Künstler in revolutionären Zeiten. Vienna: Molden Verlag, 2020.

- The String Quartets of Beethoven. Urbana: University of Illinois Press. 2006. ISBN 0-252-03036-2.
- Mozart's Piano Music. New York, NY: Oxford University Press. 2006. ISBN 0-19-510067-0.

== Essays ==
- Die Diabelli-Variationen von 1819. Die Skizzenbefunde zu op. 120. Eine Studie zum kompositorischen Schaffensprozess. In: Zu Beethoven. Aufsätze und Dokumente 2. edited by Harry Goldschmidt, Berlin 1984, p. 130–162.
- Integration and Narrative Design in Beethoven's Piano Sonata in As Major, opus 110, in Beethoven forum, vol. 1 (1992), p. 111–145.
- Anton Schindler as Beethoven's Biographer: New Evidence from the Sketchbooks. In Kunstwerk und Biographie. Gedenkschrift Harry Goldschmidt. Edited by Hanns-Werner Heister, Berlin 2002, p. 313–323.
- The Great and the Small, the Tiny and the Infinite. Aesthetic Experimentation in Beethoven’s Known and Unknown Bagatelles, in Musik und Biographie. Festschrift für Rainer Cadenbach. edited by Cordula Heymann-Wentzel and Johannes Laas, Königshausen & Neumann, Würzburg 2004, p. 179–196, ISBN 3-8260-2804-X
- Beethoven’s Unfinished Piano Trio in F minor from 1816: A Study of its Genesis and Significance. In Journal of Musicological Research. Volume 25, 2006, p. 1–42.
- Die Skizzenbücher Beethovens. In Ästhetische Erfahrung und Edition. Edited by Rainer Falk and Gert Mattenklott, Tübingen 2007, p. 151–174.
