= Piano Sonata No. 30 (Beethoven) =

Piano sonata by Ludwig van Beethoven

- by Ludwig van Beethoven
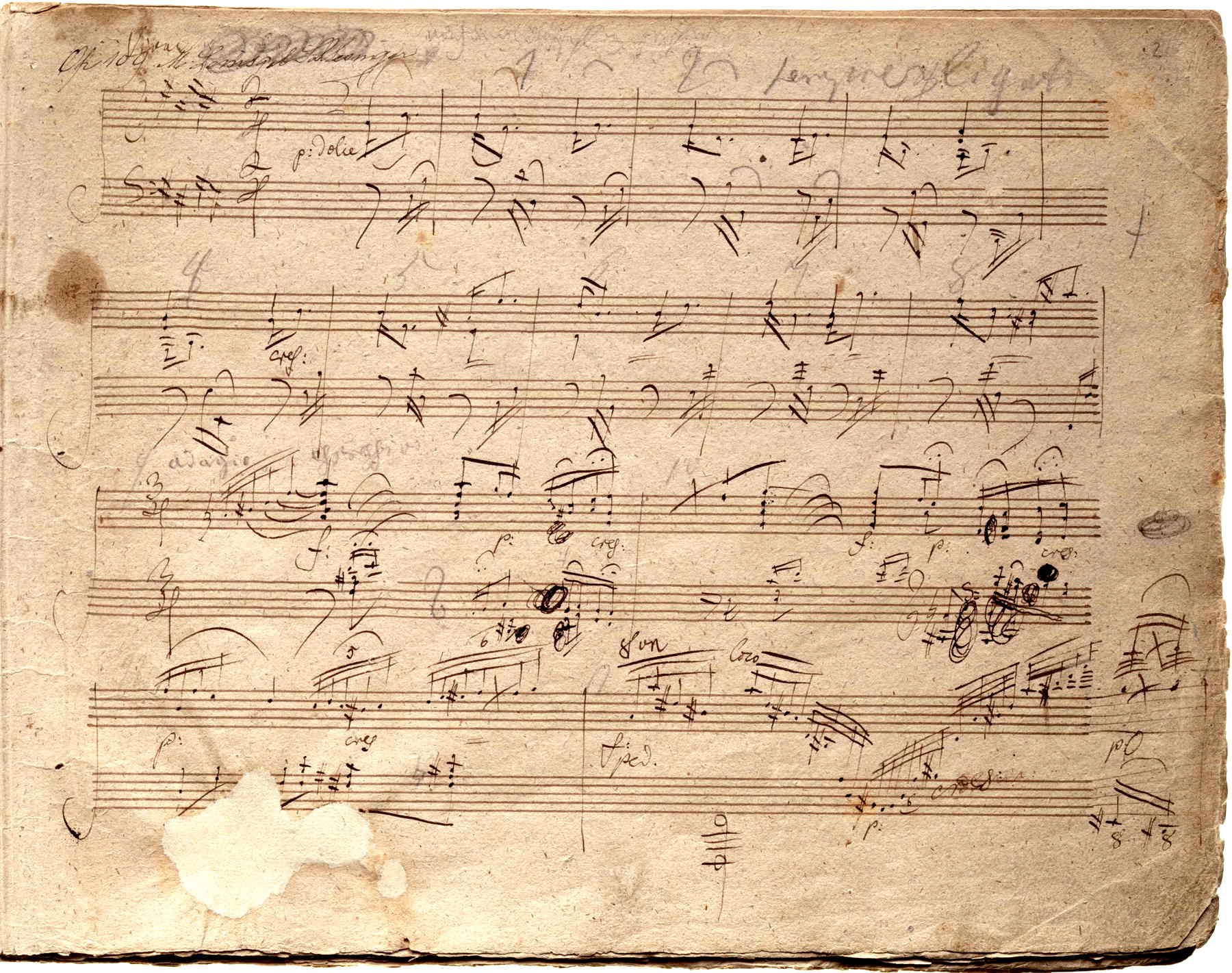
- Manuscript of the beginning of the first movement
- Key: E major
- Opus: 109
- Composed: 1820
- Dedication: Maximiliane Brentano
- Published: 1821
- Movements: 3

Ludwig van Beethoven's Piano Sonata No. 30 in E major, Op. 109, composed in 1820, is the third-to-last of his piano sonatas. In this sonata, after the grandeur of Hammerklavier Sonata, Op. 106, Beethoven returns to a smaller scale and a more intimate character. It is dedicated to Maximiliane Brentano, the daughter of Beethoven's long-standing friend Antonie Brentano, for whom Beethoven had already composed the short Piano Trio in B♭ major WoO 39 in 1812. Musically, the work is characterised by a free and original approach to the traditional sonata form. Its focus is the third movement, a set of variations that interpret its theme in a wide variety of individual ways.

== History ==
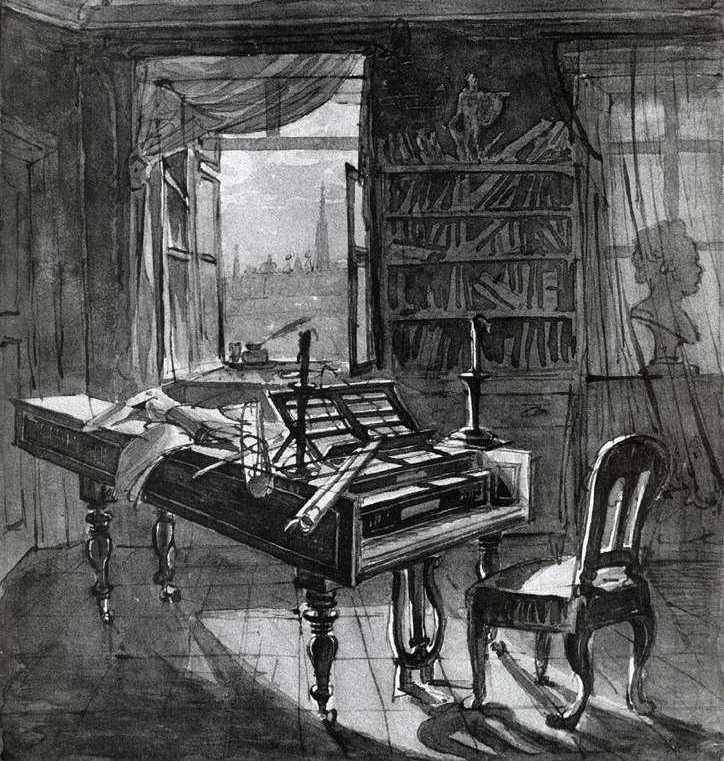
Beethoven's studio (Johann Nepomuk Hoechle, 1827)

Work on Op. 109 can be traced back to early in 1820, even before Beethoven's negotiations with Adolf Schlesinger, the publisher of his last three sonatas. Recent research suggests that Friedrich Starke had asked Beethoven for a composition for his piano anthology The Vienna Pianoforte School, and that Beethoven had interrupted work on the Missa Solemnis. In the end, though, he offered Starke numbers 7–11 of the Bagatelles, Op. 119.

=== Genesis ===
There is an April entry in Beethoven's conversation book describing a "small new piece" that is, according to William Meredith, identical to the first movement of Op. 109. In fact, the outline of the movement makes the idea of a Bagatelle interrupted by fantasia-like interludes seem very plausible. Beethoven's secretary Franz Oliva then allegedly suggested the idea of using this "small piece" as the beginning of the sonata that Schlesinger wanted. Sieghard Brandenburg has put forward the theory that Beethoven had originally planned a two-movement sonata, omitting the first movement. Apparently some of the motivic characteristics that link the first movement with the others were only introduced later. Alexander Wheelock Thayer, on the other hand, put forward the view that the beginning of a sonata in E minor by Beethoven was not developed further and had nothing to do with Op. 109.

For the third movement, Beethoven first sketched a set of about six variations, then a set of nine, and finally a continuity draft for a set of six. The differences in character between the individual variations seem to be smaller in the nine-variation version than in the final printed edition, but according to Kay Dreyfus this already indicates a "process of exploration and re-discovery of the theme".

=== Publication ===
It has not been conclusively established whether Beethoven completed the sonata in the autumn of 1820 or only in 1821. In letters to his publisher in 1820, he was already speaking of "Fertigstellung" (completion); but it is unclear whether Beethoven meant completed concepts, drafts or a fair copy that could be dispatched. The first edition was published by Schlesinger in Berlin in November 1821. It contained many errors, since Beethoven had sent the difficult-to-read autograph score to the Berlin-based publisher Schlesinger instead of a fair copy and was prevented by illness from undertaking adequate proof-reading of the prints. The sonata is dedicated to Maximiliane Brentano, the musically gifted daughter of Franz and Antonie Brentano.

=== First performances ===
The date of the first performance is unknown. The first pianists to undertake bringing Beethoven's last sonatas, including Op. 109, to public attention were Franz Liszt, who regularly included them in his programs between 1830 and 1840, and Hans von Bülow, who even included several of the late sonatas in one evening. Arabella Goddard is credited as having been the first pianist to program all of Beethoven's late sonatas in a single concert series. The Musical World reported in 1857, "No pianist in Europe has hitherto been able to boast of having performed the five last sonatas of Beethoven in public, at five alternate soirées, with very brief intervals between; but Miss Goddard has accomplished this feat, and accomplished it to admiration."

== General considerations ==
With regard to Beethoven's late work, and especially to his late piano sonatas, Op. 109 is particularly noteworthy for its divergence from the norms of sonata form and for its harmonic and structural innovations.

=== Beethoven's last sonatas ===
Opus 109 is one of Beethoven's last three, five or six sonatas that are counted among his late works. The different cut-off points arise from the fact that the sonatas from Opus 90 on are varied and contradictory in form and in their predominant musical tendencies. The pianistic means are reduced to leaner, chamber music-like voice leading, as in the first movement of Opus 110, or dissolved into recitative-like passages, as in the third movement of the same work. These procedures contrast with a heightened virtuosity, a broadening of the form and an increase in overall length, as for example in the Hammerklavier sonata, Op. 106. In Op. 109, reminiscences of the straightforward style of the early, Haydn-influenced sonatas contrast with harmony that is sometimes harsh, anticipating the music of the 20th century. This gives special importance to the principles of polyphonic variation, as in the second movement of Op. 109, and consequently the use of baroque forms, especially fugue and fugato. Very wide intervals between the outer voices, a process of breaking the music into ever shorter note values (as in the sixth variation in Op. 109), use of trills to resolve the music into layers of sound (the same variation in Op. 109 and again in Op. 111), arpeggios, ostinati and tremolos gain increased significance.

=== General characteristics ===
This sonata seduces the listener with its intimate, less dramatic character and distinguishes itself by its special lyricism, "melodic and harmonic beauties" and ornaments and arabesques hinting at Chopin. In this sonata, as in many of Beethoven's late works, one interval is significant throughout. Here it is the interval of a third. It shares with other late Beethoven sonatas the shift of focus to the last movement, the dissolution into "pure sound" and the references to old baroque forms. Some similarities to the opening of the Sonata in A, Op.101 have been noted.

=== Key ===
Throughout the history of music there has been much philosophy and speculation about the character of the individual keys. In Beethoven, E major (frequently described as bright and radiant) and E minor (sad, lamenting) often appear together, as in Op. 14 No. 1, the second Razumovsky quartet and Op. 90. The combination has been said to mitigate both the light and the dark aspects of the music.

=== Differences from the standard model ===
Opus 109 differs from the "standard model" in several ways. Although written in three movements, it feels more like "two balanced movements", since the first movement is linked to the scherzo-like Prestissimo by holding down the pedal. The internal form of the first movement is based less on elaboration than on the contrasting juxtaposition of fast and slow, loud and soft, and major and minor. Hence the second movement takes on even more of the function usually assigned to the first movement, which would be in sonata-allegro form. Then the third movement is – most unusually for a sonata – a theme and variations. Thus the theme in the third movement takes on the role of the slow movement, which is usually the second movement in the standard model. Although the sonata is formally in three movements, many leading musicians and recordings make it sound like two movements by going into the second movement without a pause and then clearly separating the third movement. However, musicologists Jürgen Uhde, Richard Rosenberg, Udo Zilkens and Carl Dahlhaus divide the work into three movements in their detailed analyses.

== Analysis ==
I. Vivace ma non troppo — Adagio espressivo

II. Prestissimo

III. Gesangvoll, mit innigster Empfindung
Played by Artur Schnabel in 1932

The three movements of this sonata are:

1. Vivace ma non troppo — Adagio espressivo, E major, 2/4 time
2. Prestissimo, E minor, 6/8 time
3. Gesangvoll, mit innigster Empfindung. Andante molto cantabile ed espressivo, E major, 3/4 time.

A performance lasts about nineteen to twenty-one minutes, of which the third movement takes more than half. Overall, the sonata is endowed with abundant melody and interesting, complex harmony.

=== I. Vivace ma non troppo — Adagio espressivo ===
The first movement reflects the strong interest that Beethoven developed during this period in structures in which contrasting sections are included parenthetically. The same tendency is manifest in the Missa Solemnis, composed at almost the same time, and in the piano sonatas following this one. A quiet, lyrical, rapid Vivace first theme is contrasted, after only eight bars, with a forte and Adagio second theme full of arpeggios. Even from a purely harmonic point of view, the contrast between the clear major in the first part and the extremely tense diminished seventh chords in the second could hardly be more obvious.

Bar 8 does not complete the cadence in the dominant (B major) that was conventional when progressing to the second subject in sonata-allegro form. Bars 9–15 continue to avoid the cadence, which only appears in bar 15. Charles Rosen and others analyse the first movement as being in sonata form, in which the two opening sections form the first and second subjects, and bars 66 to the end as a coda.

Richard Rosenberg confirms the three-part structure of sonata form, but cannot identify any thematic duality within the exposition. Rather, he sees a correspondence between the upper voices of the Vivace and the Adagio together with the bass of the Vivace on the one hand (E–D♯–C♯–B–A–G♯–B–E) and the middle voice in the left hand of the Adagio on the other (D♯–E–F♯–G♯–A–C♯–D♯–E).

Jürgen Uhde and Richard Rosenberg point out a similarity between the opening theme of the present sonata and that of the Vivace movement of the Sonata in G major, Op. 79.

=== II. Prestissimo ===
The stormy Prestissimo in E minor has been described as one of Beethoven's most tuneful Prestissimo movements.

This movement is in Sonatina form, although the usual contrast between the first subject (E minor) and the second subject (B minor) is completely absent here because of the nature of the thematic material.

=== III. Gesangvoll, mit innigster Empfindung ===
This movement consists of a theme with six variations of differing character and piano technique.

==== Theme ====
The movement opens with a 16-bar theme. The dotted notes emphasise the second beat of the bar, giving this song-like theme something of the character of a Sarabande. Its "dignified, meditative feel is strengthened by emphasis on the tonic E", which is reached through the falling third in bars 1 and 3, and later through other, wider intervals such as the falling fifth in bar 5 and the rising minor sixth in bar 7. Bars 1–2 are present in various shapes throughout the first eight bars. Bars 1–2 and 5–6 are based on a common thematic shape: G♯–E–D♯–B; bars 3–4 and 7–8 are based similarly on G♯–E–F♯–A♯–B.

==== Variation 1 ====
This variation keeps the tempo of the theme. Compared with the quartet-like theme, it is more pianistic. The melody is an octave higher, thereby becoming more emotional. It is formed like a "ceremonial waltz". With its accompanying formulae in the left hand, its ornamentation and its nuanced dynamics, it calls to mind many later compositions, such as bars 16–20 of Chopin's Waltz in A minor Op. 34, No. 2. or Debussy's Prelude Danseuses de Delphe.

==== Variation 2 ====
This variation is marked leggiermente. Whereas the theme and first variation were a binary phrase structure, here we have three variations collated and presented as one. The first texture is a call and response which strongly recalls the beginning of the first movement. The second is a two-voice canon in the right hand over a steady quaver accompaniment. The two textures are then combined to form a third, with alternating semiquavers between the left and right hands as in the beginning, with a steady quaver chordal pulse as in the second part. This pattern is then repeated for the second half of the theme.

==== Variation 3 (Allegro vivace) ====
This variation breaks away from the original tempo and is marked Allegro vivace. It replaces the theme's 3/4 time signature with 2/4. It is a virtuosic Allegro in a two-part contrapuntal texture reminiscent of a two-part invention. This is the only variation in this movement to end on forte.

==== Variation 4 ====
This variation is a little slower than the theme ("Etwas langsamer, als das thema. Un poco meno andante ciò è un poco più adagio come il tema."). It is in 9/8 time. The first half (repeated) is a contrapuntal texture varying between two and four voices. In the second half, between zero and two voices continue in the same vein over an accompaniment of broken chords.

==== Variation 5 (Allegro ma non troppo) ====
After variation 4, Beethoven abandons numbering the variations and just provides tempo indications at the head of the remaining ones. The reasons are unknown. In spite of this, it is usual to refer to the remaining variations as numbers 5 and 6.

According to Udo Zilkens, the driving rhythmic energy of the fifth variation gives the impression, at least to begin with, of a complex, many-voiced chorale-like fugue.

The Schenker edition gives three different bar numberings for this variation, two of which imply the omission of some of the bars. Neither preface identifies the sources leading to these numberings.

==== Variation 6 (Tempo primo del tema) ====
In extreme contrast to the energy and speed of the previous variation, this one begins with a four-bar passage marked cantabile, in quiet, slow crotchets at the tempo of the theme. Its peaceful, static character is emphasised by the repeated B in the top voice. As the sonata progresses to its conclusion, Beethoven intensifies almost every musical parameter to the maximum. Note values intensify the rhythm by decreasing from crotchets through quavers, triplet quavers and semiquavers to demisemiquavers. Contrast of register is increased by alternating very prominent high notes and deep bass notes. From bar 12, long drawn-out trills in both hands and from bar 17, raging arpeggios and sequences in the top voice build further towards a climax. Then the last sixteen bars repeat the simple theme – just as if nothing had happened – and quietly fade away.

=== The work as a whole ===
Already in the first two movements, many musicologists see motifs, scale passages, rhythmic models and characteristic idioms that reach their full potential only in the third movement. Jürgen Uhde does not consider the first two movements to be completely self-sufficient constructions in their own right. Rather, often in concealed ways, they already foreshadow the theme of the third movement as the goal of the whole sonata. Richard Rosenberg, in his "reductions", concentrates more on the commonalities among the bass and middle voices of the movements. Starting with the first eight bars of the first movement, he reduces the bass progressions of each movement to a fundamental model of a stepwise descent followed by an ascent in leaps.

This approach recalls Heinrich Schenker's determination of an Ursatz through his technique of reductive analysis. Uhde and others often point out the danger of too much interpretative license indicating parallels between passages that are scarcely related.
