= Piano Sonata No. 25 (Beethoven) =

Piano sonata written by Beethoven

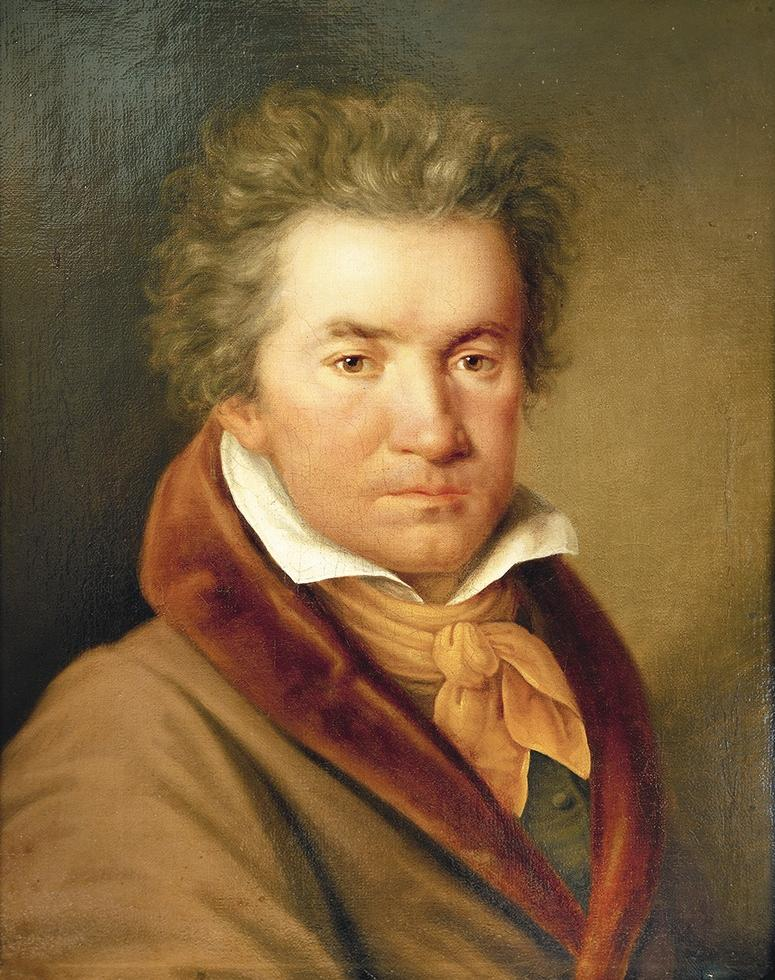
Beethoven in 1815; painted by Joseph Willibrord Mähler (1778–1860)

The Piano Sonata No. 25 in G major, Op. 79, was composed by Ludwig van Beethoven in 1809. It is alternatively titled "Cuckoo" or "Sonatina," and it is notable for its shortness. A typical performance lasts only about nine minutes. The work is in three movements: a fast-paced Presto alla tedesca, a slower Andante, and a lively Vivace.

== Analysis ==
I. Presto alla tedesca

II. Andante

III. Vivace
Played by Artur Schnabel in 1932

It consists of three movements:

1. Presto alla tedesca
2. Andante
3. Vivace

It is one of Beethoven's shortest sonatas with an approximate performance time of only nine minutes, if Beethoven's prescribed repeats are all observed. It is also the shortest of all his sonatas with a three movement structure.

=== I. Presto alla tedesca ===
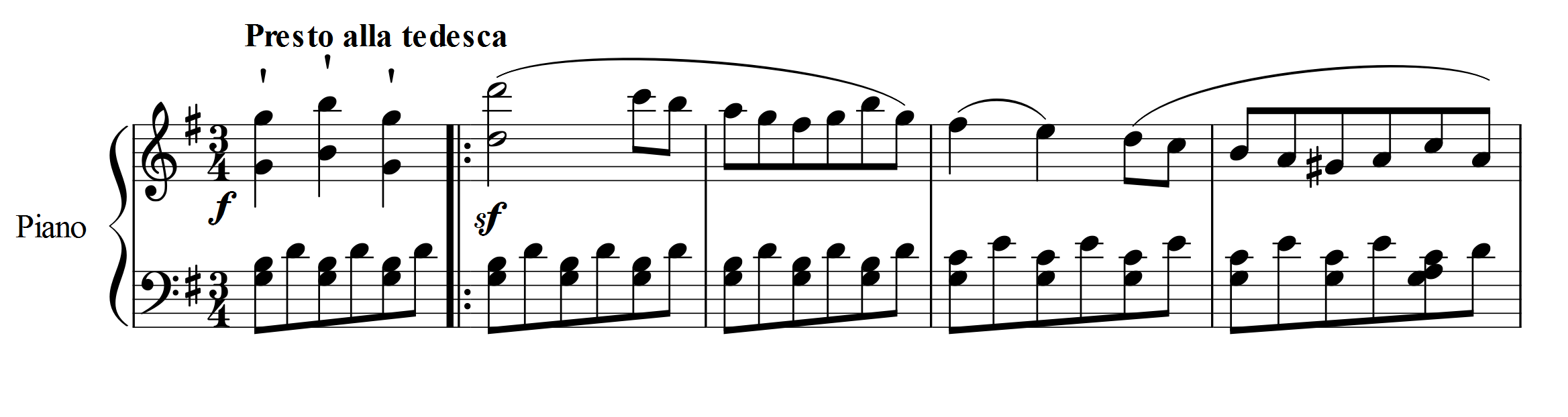

The first movement opens forcefully with a three-note motif (G–B–G) heard frequently throughout the movement. The second theme group in D major is based on fast scale and arpeggio passages and leads very swiftly into the forceful codetta. A few hesitant octave notes are played before the exposition repeats. The entire exposition is about 35 seconds long (without the repeat).

The development section dominates this movement, being approximately 60 seconds long. It features frequent modulation as well as themes borrowed and fragmented from the exposition including the opening three note motive which is heard in the form of left-hand crossovers. This motive starts on E major, then moves on to B major seventh and later to C minor followed by G seventh, ending in a strange E♭ major, B♭ seventh combination. The recapitulation snaps the listener back to the home key forcefully with its opening three-note motif, then proceeds to repeat the exposition entirely in the home key.

The development and recapitulation together are enclosed in a second, longer repeat mark.

As a final touch, the coda features the main theme played in G major in the left hand with a treble clef, then the theme again in A minor in the right hand with bass accompaniment, then again with comedic acciaccatura inserted. The recapitulation and coda together take up approximately another minute.

The whole movement with the exposition repeated lasts approximately three minutes. If the second repeat prescribed by Beethoven, encompassing the development and recapitulation, is observed, this brings the total performance time to around four and a half minutes.

=== II. Andante ===
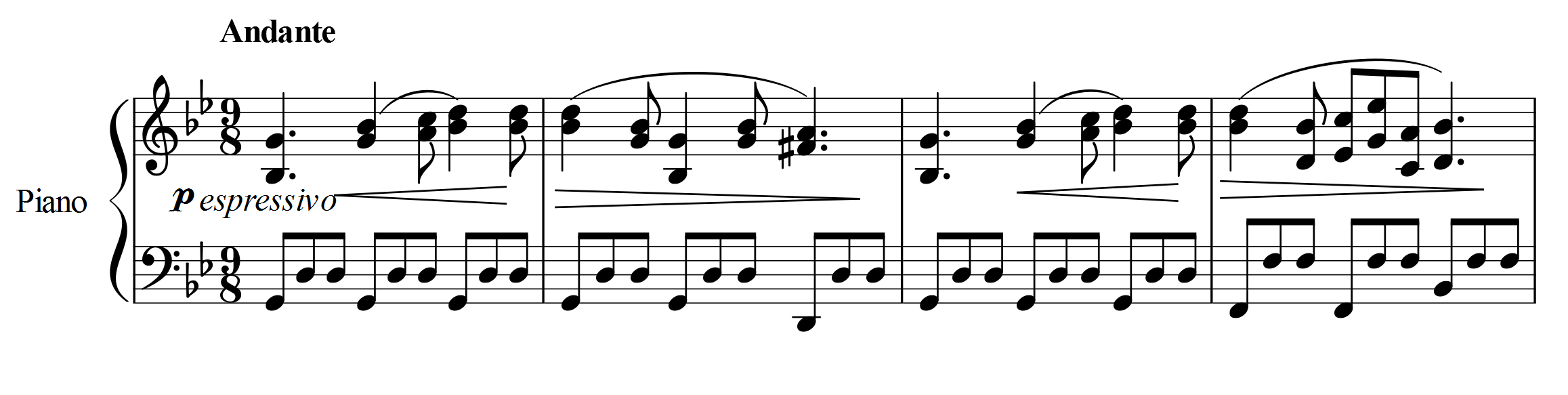

The andante movement, in G minor, uses a tranquil theme in 9/8 time, quite uncommon in Beethoven's works, and a gentle, light atmosphere to present contrast to the ecstatic first movement. It is about two and a half minutes long.

=== III. Vivace ===
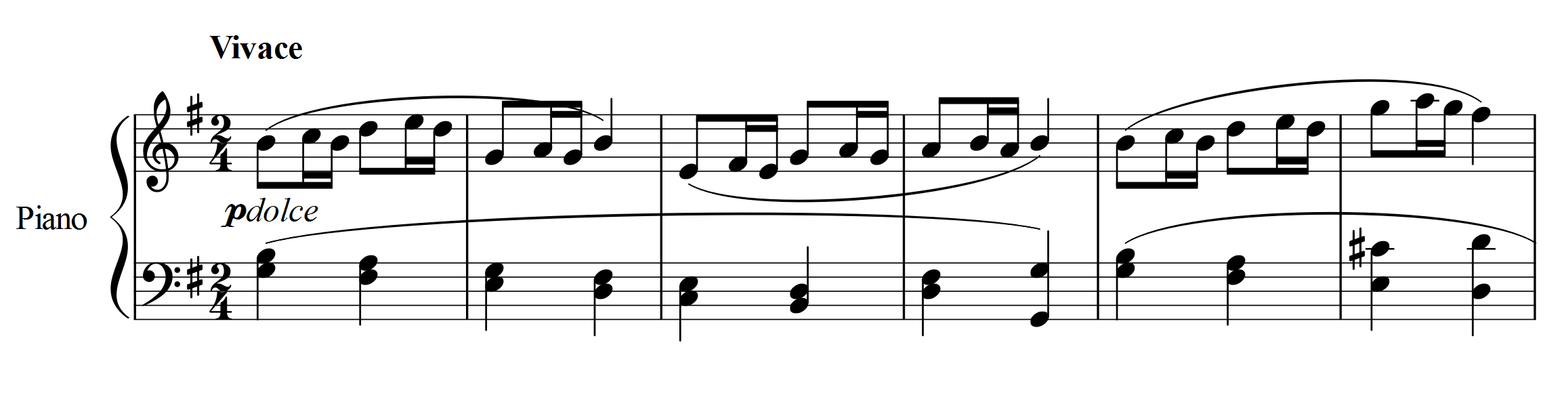

The finale movement is the most playful and the shortest at barely two minutes long. The movement is constructed in rondo form (ABACA′ and a coda), with a two-part theme and contrasting episodes in key (B) and in rhythm (C). A very brief coda brings this quick, lighthearted sonata to a brisk end. Beethoven later uses the chord progression found at the beginning of the A section to start his Sonata No. 30. A comparison of the two pieces gives a dramatic illustration of how Beethoven's piano-writing developed in the 11 years that intervened between the two sonatas. The Op. 109 theme is altogether subtler and subject to dramatic twists that lead the listener into quite unexpected harmonic territory.
