= List of compositions by Ludwig van Beethoven =

Title page of Beethoven's symphonies from the Gesamtausgabe

The list of compositions of Ludwig van Beethoven consists of 722 works written over forty-five years, from his earliest work in 1782 (variations for piano on a march by Ernst Christoph Dressler) when he was only eleven years old and still in Bonn, until his last work just before his death in Vienna in 1827. Beethoven composed works in all the main genres of classical music, including symphonies, concertos, string quartets, piano sonatas and opera. His compositions range from solo works to those requiring a large orchestra and chorus.

Beethoven straddled both the Classical and Romantic periods, working in genres associated with Wolfgang Amadeus Mozart and his teacher Joseph Haydn, such as the piano concerto, string quartet and symphony, while on the other hand providing the groundwork for other Romantic composers, such as Hector Berlioz and Franz Liszt, with programmatic works such as his Pastoral Symphony and Piano Sonata "Les Adieux". Beethoven's work is typically divided into three periods: the "Early" period, where he composed in the "Viennese" style; the "Middle" or "Heroic" period, where his work is characterised by struggle and heroism, such as in the Eroica Symphony, the Fifth Symphony, the Appassionata Sonata and in his sole opera Fidelio; and the "Late" period, marked by intense personal expression and an emotional and intellectual profundity. Although his output greatly diminished in his later years, this period saw the composition of masterpieces such as the late string quartets, the final five piano sonatas, the Diabelli Variations, the Missa Solemnis and the Ninth Symphony.

Beethoven's works are classified by both genre and various numbering systems. The best-known numbering system for Beethoven's works is that by opus number, assigned by Beethoven's publishers during his lifetime. Only 172 of Beethoven's works have opus numbers, divided among 138 opus numbers. Many works that were unpublished or published without opus numbers have been assigned one of "WoO" (Werke ohne Opuszahl—works without opus number), Hess or Biamonti numbers. For example, the short piano piece "Für Elise" is more fully known as the "Bagatelle in A minor, WoO 59 ('Für Elise')". Some works are also commonly referred to by their nicknames, such as the Kreutzer Violin Sonata, or the Archduke Piano Trio.

Works are also often identified by their number within their genre. For example, the 14th string quartet, published as Opus 131, may be referenced either as "String Quartet No. 14" or "the Opus 131 String Quartet". The listings below include all of these relevant identifiers. While other catalogues of Beethoven's works exist, the numbers here represent the most commonly used.

== List of works by genre ==
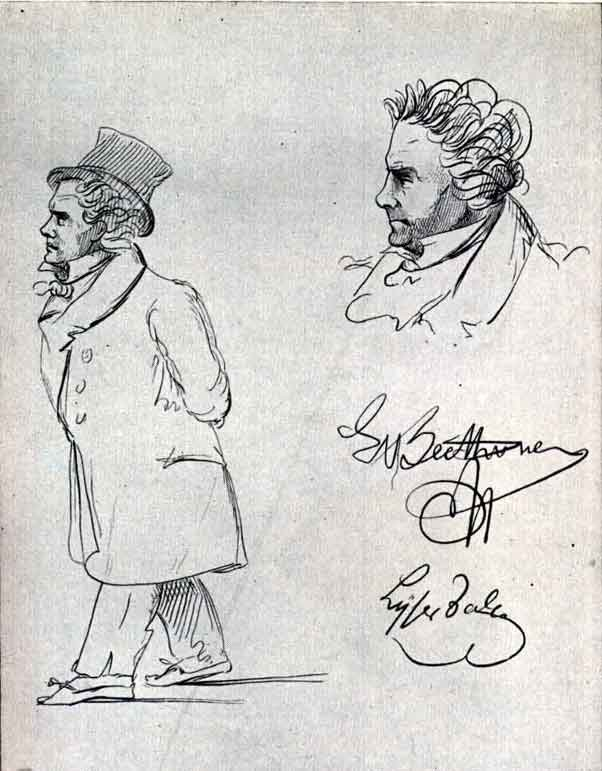
Beethoven, caricatured by Johann Peter Lyser

Beethoven's works are published in several editions, the first of these was Ludwig van Beethovens Werke: Vollständige kritisch durchgesehene überall berechtigte Ausgabe published between 1862 and 1865 with a supplemental volume in 1888 by Breitkopf & Härtel, commonly known as the "Beethoven Gesamtausgabe" [GA]. While this was a landmark achievement at the time, the limitations of this edition soon became apparent. Between 1959 and 1971 Willy Hess prepared a supplemental edition, Beethoven: Sämtliche Werke: Supplemente zur Gesamtausgabe, [HS] containing works that were not in the Gesamtausgabe.

Since 1961, the Beethoven Archive has been publishing a new scholarly–critical Complete Edition of Beethoven's works, Beethoven: Werke: neue Ausgabe sämtlicher Werke [NA]. However, only 42 of the projected 56 volumes have been published so far. As this edition has not been published in full there are works without an NA designation.

Legend for publications – p: parts s: full score vs: vocal score

=== Orchestral music ===
Beethoven wrote nine symphonies, nine concertos, and a variety of other orchestral music, ranging from overtures and incidental music for theatrical productions to other miscellaneous "occasional" works, written for a particular occasion. Of the concertos, seven are widely known (one violin concerto, five piano concertos, and one triple concerto for violin, piano, and cello); the other two are an early piano concerto (WoO 4) and an arrangement of the Violin Concerto for piano and orchestra (Opus 61a).

==== Symphonies ====
No.	Title, key	Composition; first performance	Publication	Dedication, remarks	GA	NA
Op. 21	Symphony No. 1 in C major	1799–2 April 1800	p: Leipzig 1801	Baron Gottfried van Swieten	i/1	i/1
Op. 36	Symphony No. 2 in D major	1801–5 April 1803	p: Vienna, 1804; for piano, violin, cello: Vienna, 1805	Prince Karl von Lichnowsky	i/2	i/1
Op. 55	Symphony No. 3 "Eroica" in E♭ major	1803–7 April 1805	p: Vienna, 1806	Prince Franz Joseph von Lobkowitz	i/3	i/2
Op. 60	Symphony No. 4 in B♭ major	1806–March 1807	p: Vienna, 1808	Count Franz von Oppersdorff	i/4	i/2
Op. 67	Symphony No. 5 "Fate" in C minor	1807–22 December 1808	p: Leipzig, 1809	Prince Lobkowitz and Count Andreas Razumovsky	i/5	i/3
Op. 68	Symphony No. 6 "Pastoral" in F major	1808–22 December 1808	p: Leipzig, 1809	Prince Lobkowitz and Count Razumovsky	i/6	i/3
Op. 92	Symphony No. 7 in A major	1811–8 December 1813	s, p: Vienna, 1816	Count Moritz von Fries	i/7	
Op. 93	Symphony No. 8 in F major	1812–27 February 1814	s, p: Vienna, 1817	shortened version of end of 1st movt, HS iv	i/8	
Op. 125	Symphony No. 9 "Choral" in D minor	1822–7 May 1824	s, p: Mainz, 1826	Frederick William III of Prussia	i/9	i/5

Beethoven is believed to have intended to write a Tenth Symphony in the last year of his life; a performing version of possible sketches was assembled by Barry Cooper.

==== Concertos ====
No.	Title, key	Composition, first performance	Publication	Dedication, remarks	GA	NA
WoO 4	Piano Concerto No. 0 in E♭ major	1784	s: GA	survives only in pf score (with orch cues in solo part)	xxv/310	iii/5
WoO 5	Violin Concerto in C major, (fragment)	1790–1792	Vienna, 1879	part of 1st movt only; 1st edn ded. Gerhard von Breuning	HS iii	
Hess 12	Oboe Concerto in F major, (lost)	1792–1793?		sent to Bonn from Vienna in late 1793; a few sketches survive		
Op. 19	Piano Concerto No. 2 in B♭ major	begun c. 1787, rev. 1790–1801	p: Leipzig, 1801	Carl Nicklas von Nickelsberg; score frag. rejected from early version, HS iii	ix/66	iii/2
	cadenza for first movement	1809	GA		ix/70a	vii/7
Op. 15	Piano Concerto No. 1 in C major	18 December 1795 rev. 1800	p: Vienna, 1801	Princess Barbara Odescalchi (née Countess von Keglevics)	ix/65	iii/2
	3 cadenzas for first movement	1809	GA		ix/70a	vii/7
Op. 37	Piano Concerto No. 3 in C minor	1800–5 April 1803?	p: Vienna, 1804	Prince Louis Ferdinand of Prussia	ix/67	iii/2
	cadenza for first movement	1809	GA		ix/70a	vii/7
Op. 56	Triple Concerto for Violin, Cello, and Piano in C major	1804–May 1808	p: Vienna, 1807	Prince Lobkowitz	ix/70	iii/1
Op. 58	Piano Concerto No. 4 in G major	1804–22 December 1808	p: Vienna, 1808	Archduke Rudolph of Austria	ix/68	iii/3
	2 cadenzas for first movement, cadenza for finale	1809?	GA		ix/70a	vii/7
	cadenza for first movement, 2 cadenzas for finale (Hess 81, 82, 83)	1809?	NA		HSx	vii/7
Op. 61	Violin Concerto in D major	23 December 1806	p: Vienna, 1808; London, 1810	Stephan von Breuning	iv/29; HSx	iii/4
Op. 61a	Beethoven's arrangement of Opus 61 for Piano in D major	1807	p: Vienna, 1808; London, 1810	Julie von Breuning	ix/73 (solo part)	iii/5
	Cadenza for first movement, cadenza for finale	1809?	GA		ix/70a	vii/7
	2 cadenzas for finale (Hess 84–85)	1809?	NA		HSx	vii/7
Op. 73	Piano Concerto No. 5 "Emperor" in E♭ major	1809–28 November 1811	p: London, 1810; Leipzig, 1811	Archduke Rudolph	ix/69	iii/3
Hess 15	Piano Concerto No. 6 in D major, (fragment)	1814–1815		unfinished (performing version completed by Nicholas Cook)		

==== Other works for soloist and orchestra ====
No.	Title, key	Composition, first performance	Publication	Dedication, remarks	GA	NA
Hess 13	Romance Cantabile	1786?	Wiesbaden, 1952	intended as slow movement of larger work	HS iii	
WoO 6	Rondo for Piano and Orchestra in B♭ major	1793	p: Vienna, 1829	orig. finale of op.19; solo part completed by Carl Czerny for 1st ed.	ix/72; HS iii	iii/5
Op. 50	Romance for Violin and Orchestra No. 2 in F major	c. 1798–November 1798?	p: Vienna, 1805		iv/31	iii/4
Op. 40	Romance for Violin and Orchestra No. 1 in G major	1801–1802	p: Leipzig, 1803		iv/30	iii/4
Hess 11	Romance for Violin and Orchestra No. 3, (lost)	1816		reported by W. Altmann in Preface to the Steiner edition of 1816 of the Violin Concerts		
Op. 80	Choral Fantasy in C minor	22 December 1808, rev. 1809	p: London, 1810; Leipzig, 1811	Maximilian Joseph, King of Bavaria;	HS xix/71	x/2

==== Overtures and incidental music ====
No.	Title, key	Composition, first performance	Publication	Dedication, remarks	GA	NA
WoO 1	"Ritterballet" in D major	1790–Bonn, 6 March 1791	pf: Leipzig and Winterthur, 1872; s: GA		xxv/286; HS viii	ii/2
Op. 43	"The Creatures of Prometheus"	1800–Burgtheater, Vienna, 28 March 1801	for pf: Vienna, 1801; p: Leipzig, 1804 [ov. only]; s: GA	Princess Christiane von Lichnowsky	ii/11; HX viii	ii/2
Op. 62	"Coriolan" Overture in C minor	March 1807	p: Vienna, 1808	Heinrich Joseph von Collin	iii/18	ii/1
Op. 138	"Leonore" Overture No. 1 in C major	1807–7 February 1828	s, p: Vienna, 1838		iii/19	ix/1
Op. 72a	"Leonore" Overture No. 2 in C major	1804–Theater an der Wien, Vienna, 20 November 1805	s: HS		HS ii. xi–xiii	ix/1
Op. 72b	"Leonore" Overture No. 3 in C major	1805–Theater an der Wien, 29 March 1806	s: HS		HS xi–xiii	ix/1
Op. 84	"Egmont" in F minor	1809–15 June 1810	p: Leipzig, 1810 [ov.], Leipzig, 1812 [remainder]; vs: Leipzig, 1812 [without ov.]; s: Leipzig, 1831		ii/12, iii/27; HS v (no.4)	ix/7
Op. 113	"The Ruins of Athens" (Die Ruinen von Athen) in G major	1811–10 February 1812	s: Vienna, 1823 [ov. only], Vienna, 1846 [complete],	ded. (by publisher) König Friedrich Wilhelm IV of Prussia	xx/207, iii/28	x/8
Op. 117	"King Stephen" (König Stephan) in Eb major	1811–10 February 1812	s: Vienna, 1826 [ov. only], GA [complete]		xx/207b, iii/23	ix/8
WoO 2a	Triumphal March, for Tarpeja in C major	26 March 1813	p: Vienna, 1840; s: GA		ii/14	ix/7
WoO 2b	Introduction to Act 2 of Leonore, 1805 version	1805, discarded		s: Mainz, 1938	HS iv	
Op. 91	Wellington's Victory "Battle Symphony"	8 December 1813	s, p: Vienna, 1816; for pf: London and Vienna, 1816	Prince Regent of England (later King George IV)	ii/10; HS viii (for pf)	ii/1
Op. 115	"Zur Namensfeier" (Feastday) in C major	1814–25 December 1815	s, p: Vienna, 1825	Prince Antoni Radziwiłł	iii/22	ii/1
WoO 96	Leonore Prohaska	1815	s: GA		xxv/272	ix/7
Op. 114	March and Chorus for "The Consecration of the House"	1822				
Op. 124	"The Consecration of the House" (Die Weihe des Hauses) in C	Josefstadt-Theater, 3 October 1822	s: Mainz, 1825	Prince Nikolay Golitsïn	iii/24	ii/1
WoO 98	Wo sich die Pulse, chorus for "The Consecration of the House"	1822	s:GA		xxv/266	ix/8
WoO 3	Gratulations-Minuet in E♭	3 November 1822	p: Vienna, 1832	written for Carl Friedrich Hensler, ded. (by publisher) Karl Holz	ii/13	ii/3

=== Chamber music ===
Beethoven wrote 16 string quartets and numerous other forms of chamber music, including piano trios, string trios, and sonatas for violin and cello with piano, as well as works with wind instruments.

==== Chamber music for strings ====
===== String quartets =====
No.	Title, key	Composition, first performance	Publication	Dedication, remarks	GA	NA
WoO 209 (Hess 33)	Minuet for String Quartet in A♭ major	1790–1792	HS		HS vi	KB vi/4
Op. 18/3	String Quartet No. 3 in D major	1798–1799	Vienna, 1801	Prince Lobkowitz	vi/39	vi/3
Op. 18/1	String Quartet No. 1 in F major	1799	Vienna, 1801	Prince Lobkowitz	vi/37	vi/3
Op. 18/2	String Quartet No. 2 in G major	1799	Vienna, 1801	Prince Lobkowitz	vi/38	vi/3
Op. 18/5	String Quartet No. 5 in A major	1799	Vienna, 1801	Prince Lobkowitz	vi/41	vi/3
Op. 18/4	String Quartet No. 4 in C minor	1799	Vienna, 1801	Prince Lobkowitz	vi/40	vi/3
Op. 18/6	String Quartet No. 6 in B♭ major	1800	Vienna, 1801	Prince Lobkowitz	vi/42	vi/3
Hess 34	String Quartet in F major	1801–1802	Vienna, 1802	Baroness Josefine von Braun; arrangement of Piano Sonata No. 9	HS vi	vi/3
Op. 59/1	String Quartet No. 7 "Razumovsky" in F major	1806	Vienna, 1808	Count Razumovsky	vi/43	vi/4
Op. 59/2	String Quartet No. 8 "Razumovsky" in E minor	1806	Vienna, 1808	Count Razumovsky	vi/44	vi/4
Op. 59/3	String Quartet No. 9 "Razumovsky" C major	1806	Vienna, 1808	Count Razumovsky	vi/45	vi/4
Op. 74	String Quartet No. 10 "Harp" in E♭ major	1809	London and Leipzig, 1810	Prince Lobkowitz	vi/46	vi/4
Op. 95	String Quartet No. 11 "Serioso" (Serious) in F minor	1810–11 May 1814	Vienna, 1816	Nikolaus Zmeskall von Domanovecz	vi/47	vi/4
Op. 127	String Quartet No. 12 in E♭ major	1824–6 March 1825	Mainz, 1826	Prince Golitsïn	vi/48	vi/5
Op. 132	String Quartet No. 15 in A minor	6 November 1825	Paris and Berlin, 1826	Prince Golitsïn	vi/51	vi/5
Op. 130	String Quartet No. 13 in B♭ major	1825–22 April 1827 (with new finale)	Vienna, 1827	Prince Golitsïn	vi/49	vi/5
Op. 133	Große Fuge in B♭ major	1825–21 March 1826	Vienna, 1827	Archduke Rudolph; original ending of Op. 130	vi/53	vi/5
Op. 131	String Quartet No. 14 in C♯ minor	1825–1826	Mainz, 1827	Baron Joseph von Stutterheim	vi/50	vi/5
Op. 135	String Quartet No. 16 in F major	1826–23 March 1828	Berlin and Paris, 1827	Johann Wolfmayer	vi/52	vi/5

===== Other chamber music for strings =====
No.	Title, key	Composition, first performance	Publication	Dedication, remarks	GA	NA
Op. 3	String Trio No. 1 in E♭ major	before 1794?	Vienna, 1796		vii/54	vi/6
Op. 4	String Quintet in E♭ major	1795	Vienna, 1796	thoroughly recomposed version of Octet Op. 103	v/36	vi/2
WoO 32	Duo for Viola and Cello, "mit zwei obligaten Augengläsern" ("with two obbligato eyeglasses")	1796–1797	1st movt: Leipzig, 1912; minuet: Frankfurt, London and New York, 1952	probably written for Zmeskall von Domanovecz	HS vi	vi/6
Op. 8	Serenade for string trio, (String Trio No. 2) in D major	1796–1797	Vienna, 1797		vii/58	vi/6
Op. 9/1	String Trio No. 3 in G major	1797–1798	Vienna, 1798	Count Johann Georg von Browne	vii/55	vi/6
Op. 9/2	String Trio No. 4 in D major	1797–1798	Vienna, 1798	Count Johann Georg von Browne	vii/56	vi/6
Op. 9/3	String Trio No. 5 in C minor	1797–1798	Vienna, 1798	Count Johann Georg von Browne	vii/57	vi/6
Op. 29	String Quintet in C major "Storm"	1801	Leipzig, 1802	Count Fries	v/34	vi/2
Op. 104	String Quintet in C minor	1817-10 December 1818	Vienna and London, 1819	arr. of Piano Trio Op. 1/3; arr. corrected by Beethoven, but largely the work of Kaufmann	v/36a	vi/2
Hess 40	Prelude for string quintet in D minor	1817	SMz, xcv (1955)		HS vi	vi/2
Op. 137	Fugue for String Quintet in D major	November 1817	Vienna, 1827		v/35	vi/2
WoO 34	Duet for two violins in A major	April 29, 1822	T. von Frimmel: Ludwig van Beethoven (Berlin, 1901)	Alexandre Boucher	HS vi	
WoO 35	Canon for two violins in A major	August 1825	L. Nohl: Neue Briefe Beethovens (Stuttgart, 1867)	Otto de Boer	HS vi	
Hess 41	String Quintet in C major	1826–1827	Vienna, 1838	survives only in piano transcription, WoO 62, last published piece.	HS viii	

==== Chamber music with piano ====
===== Solo instrument and piano =====
No.	Title, key	Composition, first performance	Publication	Dedication, remarks	GA	NA
Hess 46	Violin Sonata in A major, (fragments)	c. 1790–1792	HS	authenticity no longer in doubt	HS ix	
Anh. 4	Flute Sonata in B♭ major	c. 1790–1792?	Leipzig, 1906	Manuscript copy found among Beethoven's papers after his death, authenticity not certain	HS ix	
WoO 40	Variations for violin and piano on Se vuol ballare from Mozart's The Marriage of Figaro in F major	1792–1793	Vienna, 1793	Eleonore von Breuning	xii/103	v/2
WoO 41	Rondo for Violin and Piano in G major	1793–1794	Bonn, 1808		xii/102	v/2
WoO 43a	Sonatina for mandolin and piano in C minor	1796	Grove1 ("Mandoline")	probably written for Countess Josephine de Clary	xxv/295	v/4
WoO 43b	Adagio for mandolin and piano in E♭ major	1796	GA	probably for Countess de Clary	xxv/296	v/4
WoO 44a	Sonatina for mandolin and piano in C major	1796	Der Merker, iii (1912)	probably for Countess de Clary	HS ix	v/4
WoO 44b	Andante and Variations for mandolin and piano in D major	1796	Sudetendeutsches Musikarchiv (1940), no.1	probably for Countess de Clary	HS ix	v/4
Op. 5/1	Cello Sonata No. 1 in F major	1796	Vienna, 1797	Friedrich Wilhelm II of Prussia	xiii/105	v/3
Op. 5/2	Cello Sonata No. 2 in G minor	1796	Vienna, 1797	Friedrich Wilhelm II of Prussia	xiii/106	v/3
WoO 45	Variations for cello and piano on "See the counquering hero comes" from Handel's Judas Maccabaeus in G major	1796	Vienna, 1797	Princess Christiane von Lichnowsky	xiii/110	v/3
Op. 66	Variations for cello and piano on "Ein Mädchen oder Weibchen" from Mozart's The Magic Flute in F major	1796?	Vienna, 1798		xiii/111	v/3
Op. 12/1	Violin Sonata No. 1 in D major	1798	Vienna, 1799	Antonio Salieri	xii/92	v/1
Op. 12/2	Violin Sonata No. 2 in A major	1798	Vienna, 1799	Antonio Salieri	xii/93	v/1
Op. 12/3	Violin Sonata No. 3 in E♭ major	1798	Vienna, 1799	Antonio Salieri	xii/94	v/1
Op. 17	Horn Sonata in F major	18 April 1800	Vienna, 1801	Baroness Josefine von Braun	xiv/112	v/4
Op. 23	Violin Sonata No. 4 in A minor	1800	Vienna, 1801	Count Fries	xii/95	v/1
Op. 24	Violin Sonata No. 5 in F major, "Spring"	1800–1801	Vienna, 1801	Count Fries	xii/96	v/1
WoO 46	Variations for cello and piano on "Bei Männern, welche Liebe fühlen" from Mozart's The Magic Flute in E♭ major	1801	Vienna, 1802	Count von Browne	xiii/111a	v/3
Op. 30/1	Violin Sonata No. 6 in A major	1801–1802	Vienna, 1803	Alexander I, Tsar of Russia	xii/97	v/2
Op. 30/2	Violin Sonata No. 7 in C minor	1801–1802	Vienna, 1803	Alexander I, Tsar of Russia	xii/98	v/2
Op. 30/3	Violin Sonata No. 8 in G major	1801–1802	Vienna, 1803	Alexander I, Tsar of Russia	xii/99	v/2
Op. 47	Violin Sonata No. 9 in A major, "Kreutzer"	1802–24 May 1803	Bonn and London, 1805	written for George P. Bridgetower, ded. Rodolphe Kreutzer	xii/100	v/2
Op. 41	Serenade for flute (or violin) and piano in D major	1803	Leipzig, 1803	arr. of Serenade op.25; arr. approved and corrected by Beethoven but largely the work of someone else	HS ix	
Op. 42	Notturno for Viola and Piano in D major	1803	Leipzig, 1804	arr. of Serenade op.8; arr. approved and corrected by Beethoven but largely the work of someone else	HS ix	
Op. 69	Cello Sonata No. 3 in A major	1807	Leipzig, 1809	Baron Ignaz von Gleichenstein	xiii/107	v/3
Op. 96	Violin Sonata No. 10 in G major	29 December 1812 Vienna, probably rev. 1814–1815	Vienna and London, 1816	written for Pierre Rode, ded. Archduke Rudolph	xii/101	v/2
Op. 102/1	Cello Sonata No. 4 in C major	1815	Bonn, 1817	Countess Marie Erdődy	xiii/108	v/3
Op. 102/2	Cello Sonata No. 5 in D major	1815	Bonn, 1817	Countess Erdődy	xiii/109	v/3
Op. 105	Six National Airs with Variations for flute (or violin) and piano in G major	1818–1819	London, Edinburgh and Vienna, 1819		xiv/113–114	v/4
Op. 107	Ten National Airs with Variations for flute (or violin) and piano in A minor	1818–1819	London and Edinburgh, 1819 [nos. 2, 6, 7]; Bonn and Cologne, 1820 [complete]		xiv/115–119	v/4

===== Piano trios =====
No.	Title, key	Composition, first performance	Publication	Dedication, remarks	GA	NA
WoO 38	Piano Trio in E♭ major	1791?	Frankfurt, 1830		xi/86	iv/3
Hess 48	Allegretto in E♭ major	1791?	Frankfurt, 1830		xi/86	iv/3
Op. 1/1	Piano Trio No. 1 in E♭ major	probably 1794-1795	Vienna, 1795	Prince Lichnowsky	xi/79	
Op. 1/2	Piano Trio No. 2 in G major	1794–1795	Vienna, 1795	Prince Lichnowsky	xi/80	
Op. 1/3	Piano Trio No. 3, C minor	1794–95	Vienna, 1795	Prince Lichnowsky	xi/81	
Op. 11	Piano Trio No. 4 in B♭ major (Gassenhauer) (additional version for clarinet, violoncello, and piano)	1797	Vienna, 1798	Countess Maria Wilhelmine von Thun	xi/89	
Op. 44	Variations on an original theme in E♭ major	1792	Leipzig, 1804		xi/88	iv/3
Op. 121a	Variations on Wenzel Müller's "Ich bin der Schneider Kakadu", "Kakadu Variations" in G major	1803? rev. 1816	Vienna and London, 1824		xi/87	iv/3
Op. 70/1	Piano Trio No. 5 in D major "Ghost"	1808	Leipzig, 1809	Countess Erdődy	xi/82	
Op. 70/2	Piano Trio No. 6 in E♭ major	1808	Leipzig, 1809	Countess Erdődy	xi/83	
Op. 97	Piano Trio No. 7 in Bb major, "Archduke"	1810–11 April 1814	Vienna and London, 1816	Archduke Rudolph	xi/84	
Op. 38	Piano Trio in E♭ major (additional version for clarinet, violoncello, and piano)	1802–1803	Vienna, 1805	Professor Johann Adam Schmidt; arr. of Septet Op. 20	xi/91	iv/3
WoO 39	Allegretto for piano trio in B♭ major	June 1812	Frankfurt, 1830	Maximiliane Brentano	xi/85	iv/3

===== Other chamber music with piano =====
No.	Title, key	Composition, first performance	Publication	Dedication, remarks	GA	NA
WoO 36/1	Piano Quartet No. 1 in E♭ major	1785	Vienna, 1828		x/75	iv/1
WoO 36/2	Piano Quartet No. 2 in D major	1785	Vienna, 1828		x/76	iv/1
WoO 36/3	Piano Quartet No. 3 in C major	1785	Vienna, 1828		x/77	iv/1
WoO 37	Trio for piano, flute and bassoon in G major	1786	GA		xxv/294	iv/3
Op. 16	Quintet for piano and winds in E♭ major	1796-6 April 1797	Vienna, 1801	Prince Joseph zu Schwarzenberg	x/74	iv/1
Op. 16b	Piano Quartet in E♭ major/minor	unknown	Vienna, 1801	arr. of Op. 16; authenticity affirmed in Wegeler and Ries (D1838)	x/78	iv/1
Op. 11	Trio for clarinet (or violin), cello and piano, ("Gassenhauer") (version with violin instead of clarinet is considered Piano Trio No. 4) in B♭ major	1797	Vienna, 1798	Countess Maria Wilhelmine von Thun	xi/89	
Op. 38	Trio for clarinet (or violin), cello and piano in E♭ major	1802–1803	Vienna, 1805	Professor Johann Adam Schmidt; arr. of Septet Op. 20	xi/91	iv/3

==== Chamber music for winds ====
No.	Title, key	Composition, first performance	Publication	Dedication, remarks	GA	NA
WoO 26	Allegro and Minuet for two flutes in G major	August 1792	A.W. Thayer: Ludwig van Beethovens Leben, ed. H. Deiters, ii (Berlin, 1901)	J.M. Degenhart	HS vii	vi/1
Op. 103	Octet for oboes, clarinets, horns, and bassoons in E♭ major	before November 1792	Vienna, 1830		viii/59	vi/1
WoO 25	Rondino for oboes, clarinets, horns and bassoons in E♭ major	1793	Vienna, 1830	intended as finale to Op. 103	viii/60	vi/1
Hess 19	Quintet for oboe, 3 horns and bassoon in E♭ major, (fragment)	1793?	Mainz, 1954	In 1862, Leopold Zellner completed a performing version from the fragments. In 1954, Willy Hess edited this and Schott published it.	HS vii	vi/1
Op. 87	Trio for two oboes and English horn in C major	1794	Vienna, 1806		viii/63	vi/1
WoO 28	Variations for two oboes and English horn on "Là ci darem la mano" from Mozart's opera Don Giovanni in C major	1795	Leipzig, 1914		HS vii	vi/1
Op. 81b	Sextet for Horns and String Quartet in E♭ major	1795	Bonn, 1810		v/33	vi/1
Op. 71	Sextet for clarinets, horns and bassoons in E♭ major	1796	Leipzig, 1810		viii/61	vi/1
Op. 20	Septet in E♭ major	2 April 1800	Leipzig, 1802	Empress Maria Theresa	v/32	vi/1
Op. 25	Serenade for flute, violin and viola in D major	1801	Vienna, 1802		viii/62	vi/1
WoO 30	Three Equali for 4 trombones in D minor	November 1812	GA	transcr. for 4 male voices by Ignaz von Seyfried perf. at Beethoven's funeral, pubd Vienna, 1827	xxv/293	vi/1

=== Solo piano music ===
In addition to the celebrated 32 piano sonatas, Beethoven's work for solo piano includes many one-movement pieces, more than twenty sets of variations, most unpublished in his lifetime or published without opus number, and over thirty bagatelles, including the well-known "Für Elise".

==== Piano sonatas ====
No.	Title, key	Composition, first performance	Publication	Dedication, remarks	GA	NA
WoO 47/1	Three early Kurfürstensonatas, No. 1 in E♭ major	1782–1783	Speyer, 1783	Archbishop Maximilian Friedrich, Elector of Cologne	xvi/156	
WoO 47/2	Three early Kurfürstensonatas, No. 2 in F minor	1782–1783	Speyer, 1783	Archbishop Maximilian Friedrich, Elector of Cologne	xvi/157	
WoO 47/3	Three early Kurfürstensonatas, No. 3 in D major	1782–1783	Speyer, 1783	Archbishop Maximilian Friedrich, Elector of Cologne	xvi/158	
WoO 50	Piano Sonatina in F major	c. 1790–1792	Munich and Duisburg, 1950	Franz Gerhard Wegeler; facs. pubd in L. Schmidt: Beethoven-Briefe (Berlin, 1909)	HS ix	
Op. 2/1	Piano Sonata No. 1 in F minor	1793–1795	Vienna, 1796	Joseph Haydn	xvi/124	vii/2
Op. 2/2	Piano Sonata No. 2 in A major	1794–1795	Vienna, 1796	Joseph Haydn	xvi/125	vii/2
Op. 2/3	Piano Sonata No. 3 in C major	1794–1795	Vienna, 1796	Joseph Haydn	xvi/126	vii/2
Op. 49/1	Piano Sonata No. 19 in G minor	1797	Vienna, 1805		xvi/142	vii/3
Op. 49/2	Piano Sonata No. 20 in G major	1795–1796	Vienna, 1805		xvi/143	vii/3
Op. 7	Piano Sonata No. 4 "Grand Sonata" in E♭ major	1797–1798	Vienna, 1798	Countess Barbara von Keglevics	xvi/127	vii/2
Op. 10/1	Piano Sonata No. 5 in C minor "Little Pathétique"	1795–1797	Vienna, 1798	Countess Anna Margaret von Browne	xvi/128	vii/2
Op. 10/2	Piano Sonata No. 6 in F major	1796–1797	Vienna, 1798	Countess von Browne	xvi/129	vii/2
Op. 10/3	Piano Sonata No. 7 in D major	1797–1798	Vienna, 1798	Countess von Browne	xvi/130	vii/2
WoO 51	Piano Sonata in C major, (fragment)	1797–1798	Frankfurt, 1830	Eleonore von Breuning; completed by Ferdinand Ries	xvi/159	
Op. 13	Piano Sonata No. 8 "Pathétique" in C minor	1797–1798	Vienna, 1799	Prince Lichnowsky	xvi/131	vii/2
Op. 14/1	Piano Sonata No. 9 in E major	1798	Vienna, 1799	Baroness Josefine von Braun	xvi/132	vii/2
Op. 14/2	Piano Sonata No. 10 in G major	1799	Vienna, 1799	Baroness Josefine von Braun	xvi/133	vii/2
Op. 22	Piano Sonata No. 11 in B♭ major	1800	Leipzig, 1802	Count von Braun	xvi/134	vii/2
Op. 26	Piano Sonata No. 12 in A♭ major	1800–1801	Vienna, 1802	Prince Lichnowsky	xvi/135	vii/2
Op. 27/1	Piano Sonata No. 13 "Quasi una fantasia" in E♭ major	1801	Vienna, 1802	Princess Josephine von Liechtenstein	xvi/136	vii/3
Op. 27/2	Piano Sonata No. 14 "Moonlight" in C♯ minor	1801	Vienna, 1802	Countess Giulietta Guicciardi	xvi/137	vii/3
Op. 28	Piano Sonata No. 15 "Pastoral" in D major	1801	Vienna, 1802	Joseph von Sonnenfels	xvi/138	vii/3
Op. 31/1	Piano Sonata No. 16 in G major	1802	Zürich, 1803		xvi/139	vii/3
Op. 31/2	Piano Sonata No. 17 in D minor, "Tempest"	1802	Zürich, 1803		xvi/140	vii/3
Op. 31/3	Piano Sonata No. 18 ("The Hunt"), E♭	1802	Zürich and London, 1804		xvi/141	vii/3
Op. 53	Piano Sonata No. 21 ("Waldstein"), C	1803–04	Vienna, 1805	Count Ferdinand von Waldstein	xvi/144	vii/3
Op. 54	Piano Sonata No. 22, F	1804	Vienna, 1806		xvi/145	vii/3
Op. 57	Piano Sonata No. 23 ("Appassionata"), F minor	1804–05	Vienna, 1807	Count Franz von Brunsvik	xvi/146	vii/3
Op. 78	Piano Sonata No. 24 ("À Thérèse"), F♯	1809	Leipzig and London, 1810	Countess Therese von Brunsvik	xvi/147	
Op. 79	Piano Sonata No. 25, G	1809	Leipzig and London, 1810		xvi/148	
Op. 81a	Piano Sonata No. 26 ("Les Adieux"), E♭	1809–10	Leipzig and London, 1811	Archduke Rudolph	xvi/149	
Op. 90	Piano Sonata No. 27, E minor	1814	Vienna, 1815	Count Moritz Lichnowsky	xvi/150	
Op. 101	Piano Sonata No. 28, A	1816	Vienna, 1817	Baroness Dorothea Ertmann	xvi/151	
Op. 106	Piano Sonata No. 29 ("Hammerklavier"), B♭	1817–18	Vienna and London, 1819	Archduke Rudolph	xvi/152	
Op. 109	Piano Sonata No. 30, E	1820	Berlin, 1821	Maximiliane Brentano	xvi/153	
Op. 110	Piano Sonata No. 31, A♭	1821–22	Paris, Berlin, Vienna, 1822; London 1823		xvi/154	
Op. 111	Piano Sonata No. 32, C minor	1821–22	Paris, Berlin, Vienna and London, 1823	Archduke Rudolph; London edn ded. Antonie Brentano	xvi/155	

==== Piano variations ====
No.	Title, key	Composition, first performance	Publication	Dedication, remarks	GA	NA
WoO 63	Nine variations on a march by Ernst Christoph Dressler in C minor	1782	Mannheim, 1782–83	Countess Felice von Wolf-Metternich; First published composition	xvii/166	vii/5
WoO 65	Twenty-four variations on Vincenzo Righini's aria "Vieni amore", D	c. 1790–91	Mainz, 1791; Vienna, 1802	Countess Maria Anna Hortensia von Hatzfeld	xvii/178	vii/5
WoO 66	Thirteen variations on the aria "Es war einmal ein alter Mann" from Carl Ditters von Dittersdorf's opera Das rote Käppchen, A	1792	Bonn, 1793		xvii/175	vii/5
WoO 64	Six variations on a Swiss song for piano or harp, F	c. 1790–92	Bonn, ?1798		xvii/177	vii/5
WoO 68	Twelve variations on the "Menuet a la Viganò" from Jakob Haibel's ballet Le nozze disturbate, C	1795	Vienna, 1796		xvii/169	vii/5
WoO 69	Nine variations on "Quant'è più bello" from Giovanni Paisiello's opera La Molinara, A	1795	Vienna, 1795	Prince Lichnowsky	xvii/167	vii/5
WoO 70	Six variations on "Nel cor più non mi sento" from Giovanni Paisiello's opera La Molinara, G	1795	Vienna, 1796		xvii/168	vii/5
WoO 72	Eight variations on "Une fièvre brûlante" from André Grétry's opera Richard Cœur-de-Lion, C	?1795	Vienna, 1798		xvii/171	vii/5
WoO 71	Twelve variations on the Russian dance from Paul Wranitzky's ballet Das Waldmädchen, A	1796–97	Vienna, 1797	Countess von Browne	xvii/170	vii/5
WoO 73	Ten variations on "La stessa, la stessissima" from Antonio Salieri's opera Falstaff, B♭	1799	Vienna, 1799	Countess von Keglevics	xvii/172	vii/5
WoO 76	Eight variations on "Tändeln und scherzen" from Franz Xaver Süssmayr's opera Soliman II, F	1799	Vienna, 1799	Countess von Browne	xvii/174	vii/5
WoO 75	Seven variations on "Kind, willst du ruhig schlafen" from Peter Winter's opera Das unterbrochene Opferfest, F	1799	Vienna, 1799		xvii/173	vii/5
WoO 77	Six easy variations on an original theme, G	1800	Vienna, 1800		xvii/176	vii/5
Op. 34	Six variations on an original theme, F	1802	Leipzig, 1803	Princess Odescalchi	xvii/162	vii/5
Op. 35	Fifteen variations and a fugue on an original theme, ("Eroica Variations") E♭	1802	Leipzig, 1803	Count Moritz Lichnowsky	xvii/163	vii/5
WoO 78	Seven variations on "God Save the King", C	1802–03	Vienna, 1804		xvii/179	vii/5
WoO 79	Five variations on "Rule, Britannia!", D	1803	Vienna, 1804		xvii/180	vii/5
WoO 80	Thirty-two variations on an original theme, C minor	1806	Vienna, 1807		xvii/181	vii/5
Op. 76	Six variations on an original theme (the Turkish March from The Ruins of Athens), D	1809	Leipzig and London, 1810	Franz Oliva	xvii/164	vii/5
Op. 120	Thirty-three variations on a waltz by Diabelli ("Diabelli Variations"), C	1819–23	Vienna, 1823	Antonie Brentano	xvii/165	vii/5

==== Shorter piano pieces ====
No.	Title, key	Composition, first performance	Publication	Dedication, remarks	GA	NA
WoO 48	Rondo, C	1783	H.P. Bossler: Blumenlese für Klavierliebhaber, ii (Speyer, 1783)		HS ix	
WoO 49	Rondo, A	?1783	H.P. Bossler: Neue Blumenlese für Klavierliebhaber, ii (Speyer, 1784)		xviii/196	
Op. 39	Two preludes through all twelve major keys for piano or organ	?1789	Leipzig, 1803		xviii/184	
WoO 81	Allemande, A	c. 1793, rev. 1822	GA		xxv/307	
Op. 129	Rondo a capriccio ("Rage Over a Lost Penny"), G	1795	Vienna, 1828	autograph completed by unknown ed. (probably Diabelli), 1828	xviii/191	
Hess 64	Fugue, C	1795	MT, xcvi (1955)		HS ix	
WoO 52	Presto (Bagatelle), C minor	c. 1795, rev. 1798 and 1822	GA	Originally intended for Sonata Op.10/1	xxv/297/1	
WoO 53	Allegretto (Bagatelle), C minor	1796–97	GA	Originally intended for Sonata Op.10/1	xxv/299	
Hess 69	Allegretto, C minor	c. 1795–96, rev. 1822	HS	probably orig. intended for Sonata op.10/1	HS ix	
Op. 51/1	Rondos, C,	c. 1796–97	London and Leipzig, 1810	Prince Lobkowitz	vi/46	
Op. 51/2	Rondos, G	c. 1798	Vienna, 1802	Countess Henriette Lichnowsky	xviii/186	
Op. 33	Seven Bagatelles	1801–02	Vienna and London, 1803		xviii/183	
WoO 54	Lustig-Traurig (Bagatelle), C	?1802	GA		xxv/300	
WoO 55	Prelude, F minor	c. 1803	Vienna, 1805		xviii/195	
WoO 56	Allegretto (Bagatelle), C	1803, rev. 1822	GA	Originally intended for sonata Op. 53	xxv/297/2	
WoO 57	Andante ("Andante favori"), F	1803	Vienna, 1805	Originally intended for sonata Op. 53	xviii/192	
WoO 82	Minuet, E♭	c. 1803	Vienna, 1805		xviii/193	
Op. 77	Fantasia, G minor	1809	Leipzig and London, 1810	Count Franz von Brunsvik	xviii/187	
WoO 59	Für Elise (Bagatelle), A minor	1808–10	L. Nohl: Neue Briefe Beethovens (Stuttgart, 1867)		xxv/298	
Op. 89	Polonaise, C	1814	Vienna, 1815	Empress Elisabeth Alexeyerna of Russia	xviii/188	
WoO 60	Ziemlich lebhaft (Bagatelle), B♭	1818	Berliner allgemeine musikalische Zeitung, i (1824)		xxv/301	
Hess 65	"Concert Finale", C	1820–21	in F. Starke, ed.: Wiener Piano-Forte-Schule, iii (Vienna, 1821)	arr. of coda to finale of Piano Concerto No. 3	HS ix	
WoO 61	Allegretto, B minor	1821	Robitschek: Deutscher Kunst- und Musikzeitung (15 March 1893)	Ferdinand Piringer	HS ix	
Op. 119	Eleven Bagatelles	1820–2	nos. 7–11 in F. Starke, ed.: Wiener Piano-Forte-Schule, iii (Vienna, 1821); all 11, London, 1823		xviii/189	
Op. 126	Six Bagatelles	1824	Mainz, 1825		xviii/190	
WoO 84	Waltz, E♭	1824	Vienna, 1824	Friedrich Demmer (publisher's ded.)	xxv/303	
WoO 61a	Allegretto quasi andante, G minor	1825	NZM, cxvii (1956)	Sarah Burney Payne	HS ix	
WoO 85	Waltz, D	1825	Vienna, 1825	Duchess Sophie of Austria (publisher's ded.)	xxv/304	
WoO 86	Ecossaise, E♭	1825	Vienna, 1825	Duchess Sophie of Austria (publisher's ded.)	xxv/305	

==== Piano four hands ====
No.	Title, key	Composition, first performance	Publication	Dedication, remarks	GA	NA
WoO 67	Eight Variations on a Theme by Count Waldstein, C	?1792	Bonn, 1794		xv/122	vii/1
Op. 6	Sonata for Piano, Four Hands, D	1796–97	Vienna, 1797		xv/120	vii/1
WoO 74	Six Variations on Beethoven's "Ich denke dein", D	1799, 1803	Vienna, 1805	Countess Therese von Brunsvik and Josephine Deym (née Brunsvik)	xv/123	vii/1
Op. 45	Three marches	1803	Vienna, 1804	Princess Maria Esterházy	xv/121	vii/1
Op. 134	Fugue for Piano, four hands, B♭	1826	Vienna, 1827	Archduke Rudolph; arr. of Große Fuge Op. 133	HS viii	vii/1

=== Vocal music ===
While he completed only one opera, Beethoven wrote vocal music throughout his life, including two Mass settings, other works for chorus and orchestra (in addition to the Ninth Symphony), arias, duets, art songs (lieder), and true song cycles.

==== Operas ====
No.	Title	Composition, first performance	Publication	Dedication, remarks	GA	NA
WoO 91	Two arias for Umlauf's Singspiel Die schöne Schusterin	?1795–96	s:GA		xxv/270	x/3
Hess 115	Vestas Feuer, fragment	1803	s: Wiesbaden, 1953		HS xiii	
Op. 72	Fidelio	1st version (with op.72a: Leonore Overture no. 2), 1804–05; Theater an der Wien, Vienna, 20 November 1805	vs: Leipzig, 1905; s: HS		HS ii. xi–xiii	
		2nd version (with op.72b: Leonore Overture no.3), 1805–06; Theater an der Wien, 29 March 1806	vs: Leipzig, 1810; s: HS		HS xi–xiii	
		final version (with op.72c: Fidelio Overture), 1814; Kärntnertor, Vienna, 23 May 1814	vs: Vienna, 1814; s: Paris, 1826, Bonn, 1847		xx/206	
WoO 94	Germania, finale of Die gute Nachricht (Singspiel, G.F. Treitschke)	1814; Kärntnertor, 11 April 1814	vs: Vienna, 1814; s: GA		xx/207d	ix/7
WoO 97	Es ist vollbracht, finale of Die Ehrenpforten (Singspiel, Treitschke)	1815; Kärntnertor, 15 July 1815	vs: Vienna, 1815; s: GA		xx/207c	ix/7
Unv. 16	Macbeth (Singspiel?)	1808-1811	Musikalisches Wochenblatt No. 10 1879	Unfinished, only overture fragment Biamonti 454.		

==== Choral works with orchestra ====
No.	Title, key	Composition, first performance	Publication	Dedication, remarks	GA	NA
WoO 87	Cantata on the Death of Emperor Joseph II	March 1790	GA		xxv/264	x/1
WoO 88	Cantata on the accession of Emperor Leopold II	September–October 1790	GA		xxv/265	x/1
Op. 85	Christus am Ölberge (Christ on the Mount of Olives)	1803, rev. 1804; 5 April 1803	Leipzig, 1811		xix/205	viii/1
Op. 86	Mass in C major	1807; 13 September 1807	Leipzig, 1812	Prince Ferdinand Kinsky	xix/204	viii/2
Op. 80	Choral Fantasy, C minor	1808, rev. 1809; 22 December 1808	p: London, 1810; Leipzig, 1811	Maximilian Joseph, King of Bavaria;	HS xix/71	x/2
WoO 95	Chor auf die verbündeten Fürsten "Ihr weisen Gründer"	September 1814	GA	for Congress of Vienna	xxv/267	x/2
Op. 136	Der glorreiche Augenblick (The glorious moment)	1814; 29 November 1814	Vienna, 1837	for Congress of Vienna	xxi/208	x/1
Op. 112	Meeresstille und glückliche Fahrt ("Calm Sea and Prosperous Voyage")	1814–15; 25 December 1815	Vienna, 1822	Johann Wolfgang von Goethe	xxi/209	x/2
Op. 123	Missa solemnis, D	1819–23; 7 April 1824	Mainz, 1827	Archduke Rudolph (orig. intended for Rudolph's installation as archbishop, 9 March 1820)	xxi/203	viii/3
	Opferlied "Die Flamme lodert"	1822; 23 December 1822	GA		xxv/268	
Op. 121b	Opferlied, 2nd version	1824	Mainz, 1824		xxii/212	x/2
Op. 122	Bundeslied "In allen guten Stunden"	1823–24	Mainz, 1825		xxii/213	x/2

==== Other choral works ====
No.	Title	Composition, first performance	Publication	Dedication, remarks	GA	NA
WoO 102	Abschiedsgesang "Die Stunde schlägt", for male voices	1814	GA	Leopold Weiss; at the request of Mathias Tuscher	xxv/273	
WoO 103	Cantata campestre "Un lieto brindisi", for four voices and piano	1814; 24 June 1814	Jb der Literarischen Vereinigung Winterthur 1945	Giovanni Malfatti	HS v	xii/1
WoO 104	Gesang der Mönche "Rasch tritt der Tod", from Wilhelm Tell (Schiller), for two tenors and bass	1817	NZM, vi (1839)	in memory of Franz Sales Kandler and Wenzel Krumpholz	xxiii/255	
WoO 105	Hochzeitslied "Auf Freunde, singt dem Gott der Ehen", for tenor (or male solo), chorus and piano	1819	Der Bär 1927 for tenor; London, 1858 for male solo	Anna Giannatasio del Rio	HS v	xii/1
WoO 106	Birthday Cantata for Prince Lobkowitz "Es lebe unser theurer Fürst", for soprano, chorus and piano	April 1823	L. Nohl: Neue Briefe Beethovens (Stuttgart, 1867)	Prince Lobkowitz	xxv/274	xii/1

==== Solo voices and orchestra ====
No.	Title	Composition, first performance	Publication	Dedication, remarks	GA	NA
WoO 89	Prüfung des Küssens, aria for bass	c. 1790–92	GA		xxv/269/1	x/3
WoO 90	Mit Mädeln sich vertragen, aria for bass	c. 1790–92	GA		xxv/269/2	x/3
WoO 92	Primo amore, scena and aria for soprano	c. 1790–92	GA		xxv/271	x/3
Op. 65	Ah! perfido, scena and aria for soprano	early 1796	p, vs: Leipzig, 1805; s: GA;	Countess Josephine de Clary (ded. in MS, not in 1st edition; text of recitative by Pietro Metastasio from Achille in Sciro	xxii/210	x/3
WoO 92a	No, non turbarti, scena and aria for soprano	early 1802	Wiesbaden, 1949		HS ii	x/3
WoO 93	Ne' giorni tuoi felici, duet for soprano and tenor	late 1802	Leipzig, 1939		HS ii, xiv	x/3
Op. 116	Tremate, empi, tremate, for soprano, tenor and bass	1802; 1814	p, vs: Vienna, 1826; s: GA		xxii:211	x/3
Op. 118	Elegiac song ("Sanft wie du lebtest"), for soprano, alto, tenor, bass and string quartet	July 1814	Vienna, 1814	Baron Johann von Pasqualati	xxii/214	x/2

==== Songs ====
No.	Title	Composition, first performance	Publication	Dedication, remarks	GA	NA
WoO 107	Schilderung eines Mädchens	?1783	H.P. Bossler: Blumenlese für Klavierliebhaber, ii (Speyer, 1783)		xxiii/228	xii/1
WoO 108	An einen Säugling	?1784	H.P. Bossler: Neue Blumenlese für Klavierliebhaber, ii (Speyer, 1784)		xxiii/229	xii/1
WoO 110	Elegie auf den Tod eines Pudels	?c. 1790	?GA		xxv/284	xii/1
WoO 113	Klage	c. 1790	GA		xxv/283	xii/1
Hess 151	Traute Henriette	c. 1790–1792	ÖMz, iv (1949)		HS v	xii/1
Op. 52	Eight Songs: 1. Urians Reise um die Welt; 2. Feuerfarb; 3. Das Liedchen von der Ruhe; 4. Maigesang; 5. Mollys Abschied; 6. Die Liebe; 7. Marmotte; 8. Das Blümchen Wunderhold	1790–96	Vienna, 1805		xxiii/218	xii/1
WoO 111	Punschlied	c. 1791	L. Schiedermair: Der junge Beethoven (Leipzig, 1925/R,3/1951)		HS v	xii/1
WoO 109	Trinklied	c. 1792	GA		xxv/282	xii/1
WoO 112	An Laura	c. 1792	G. Kinsky: Musik historisches Museum von Wilhelm Heyer in Cöln: Katalog, iv (Cologne, 1916)		HS v	xii/1
WoO 114	Selbstgespräch	c. 1792	GA		xxv/275	xii/1
WoO 115	An Minna	c. 1792	GA		xxv/280	xii/1
WoO 117	Der freie Mann	1792, rev. 1794	Bonn, 1808		xxiii/232; HS v	xii/1
WoO 116	Que le temps dure					xii/1
Hess 129		?early 1794	Die Musik, i (1901–02)	1st version of WoO 116	HS v	
Hess 130		?1794	GA	2nd version of WoO 116	HS v	
WoO 119	O care selve	c. 1794	GA		xxv/279	xii/1
WoO 126	Opferlied	1794–95, rev. 1801–02	Bonn, 1808		xxiii/233; HS v	xii/1
WoO 118	Two Songs: 1. Seufzer eines Ungeliebten; 2. Gegenliebe	1794–95	Vienna, 1837		xxiii/253	xii/1
Op. 46	Adelaide	1794–95	Vienna, 1797	Friedrich von Matthisson	xxiii/216	xii/1
WoO 123	Zärtliche Liebe	c. 1795	Vienna, 1803		xxiii/249	xii/1
WoO 124	La partenza	c. 1795–1796	Vienna, 1803		xxiii/251	xii/1
WoO 121	Abschiedsgesang an Wiens Bürger	1796	Vienna, 1796	Obrist Wachtmeister von Kövesdy	xxiii/230	xii/1
WoO 122	Kriegslied der Österreicher	1797	Vienna, 1797		xxiii/231	xii/1
WoO 125	La tiranna	1798–99	London, 1799	ded. (by W. Wennington) Mrs Tschoffen	HS v	xii/1
WoO 128	Plaisir d'aimer	1798–99	Die Musik, i (1901–02)		HS v	xii/1
WoO 127	Neue Liebe, neues Leben	1798–99	Bonn, 1808		HS v	xii/1
WoO 74	Ich denke dein					
Op. 48	Six Songs: 1. Bitten; 2. Die Liebe des Nächsten; 3. Vom Tode; 4. Die Himmel rühmen des Ewigen Ehre; 5. Gottes Macht und Vorsehung; 6. Busslied	c. 1801 – early 1802	Vienna, 1803	Count von Browne	xxiii/217	xii/1
WoO 120	Man strebt die Flamme zu verhehlen	c. 1802	GA	Frau von Weissenthurn	xxv/278	xii/1
WoO 129	Der Wachtelschlag	1803	Vienna, 1804	Count von Browne	xxiii/234	xii/1
Op. 88	Das Glück der Freundschaft	1803	Vienna, 1803		xxiii/222	xii/1
Op. 32	An die Hoffnung	1805	Vienna, 1805	for Josephine Deym	xxiii/215	xii/1
WoO 130	Gedenke mein	?1804–05, rev. 1819–20	Vienna, 1844		xxv/281	xii/1
WoO 132	Als die Geliebte sich trennen wollte	1806	AMZ, xii (1809–10)		xxiii/235	xii/1
WoO 133	In questa tomba oscura	1806–07	Vienna, 1808	ded. (by publisher) Prince Lobkowitz	xxiii/252	xii/1
WoO 134	Sehnsucht (4 settings)	1807–08	Vienna, 1810		xxiii/250	xii/1
WoO 136	Andenken	1805	Leipzig and London 1810	for Josephine Deym	xxiii/248	xii/1
WoO 137	Lied aus der Ferne	1809	Leipzig and London, 1810		xxiii/236	xii/1
WoO 138	Der Jüngling in der Fremde	1809	Vienna, 1810	ded. (by Reissig) Archduke Rudolph	xxiii/237	xii/1
WoO 139	Der Liebende	1809	Vienna and London, 1810	ded. (by Reissig) Archduke Rudolph	xxiii/238	xii/1
Op. 75	Six Songs: 1. Mignon; 2. Neue Liebe, neues Leben; 3. Aus Goethes Faust; 4. Gretels Warnung; 5. An den fernen Geliebten; 6. Der Zufriedene	1809	Leipzig and London, 1810	Princess Caroline Kinsky	xxiii/219	xii/1
Op. 82	Four Ariettas and a Duet: 1. Hoffnung; 2. Liebes-Klage; 3. L'amante impatiente 4. L'amante impatiente 5. Lebens-Genuss	?1809	Leipzig and London, 1811		xxiii/220	xii/1
Op. 83	Three Songs: 1. Wonne der Wehmut; 2. Sehnsucht; 3. Mit einem gemalten Band	1810	Leipzig, 1811	Princess Caroline Kinsky	xxiii/221	xii/1
WoO 140	An die Geliebte (2 versions)	December 1811, rev. 1814	1st version: Augsburg, c. 1826; 2nd version: Friedensblätter (12 July 1814)		xxiii/243a	xii/1
WoO 141	Der Gesang der Nachtigall	May 1813	GA		xxv/227	xii/1
WoO 142	Der Bardengeist	November 1813	Erichson: Musen-Almanach für das Jahr 1814 (Vienna, 1813–14)		xxiii/241	xii/1
Op. 94	An die Hoffnung	1813–15	Vienna, 1816	Princess Kinsky	xxiii/223	xii/1
WoO 143	Des Kriegers Abschied	1814	Vienna, 1815	ded. (by Reissig) Caroline von Bernath	xxiii/240	xii/1
WoO 144	Merkenstein	1814	Selam: ein Almanach für Freunde des Mannigfaltigen auf das Schaltjahr 1816 (Vienna, 1815–16)		xxv/276	xii/1
Op. 100	Merkenstein	1814	Vienna, 1816	Count Joseph Karl von Dietrichstein	xxiii/226	xii/1
WoO 135	Die laute Klage	?c. 1815	Vienna, 1837		xxiii/254	xii/1
WoO 145	Das Geheimnis	1815	Wiener Zeitschrift für Kunst, Literatur, Theater und Mode, i (1816)		xxiii/245	xii/1
WoO 146	Sehnsucht	early 1816	Vienna, 1816		xxiii/239	xii/1
Op. 98	An die ferne Geliebte: 1. Auf dem Hügel sitz ich spähend 2. Wo die Berge so blau 3. Leichte Segler in den Höhen; 4. Diese Wolken in den Höhen; 5. Es kehret der Maien; 6. Nimm sie hin denn diese Lieder	1816	Vienna, 1816	Prince Lobkowitz	xxiii/224	xii/1
Op. 99	Der Mann von Wort	?May 1816	Vienna, 1816		xxiii/225	xii/1
WoO 147	Ruf von Berge	December 1816	Gedichte von Friedrich Treitschke (Vienna, 1817)		xxiii/242	xii/1
WoO 148	So oder so	1817	Wiener Zeitschrift für Kunst, ii (1817)		xxiii/224	xii/1
WoO 149	Resignation	1817	Wiener Zeitschrift für Kunst, iii (1818)		xxiii/246	xii/1
WoO 150	Abendlied unterm gestirnten Himmel	March 1820	Wiener Zeitschrift für Kunst, v (1817)		xxiii/247	xii/1
Op. 128	Der Kuss	November–December 1822	Mainz, 1825		xxiii/227	xii/1
WoO 151	Der edle Mensche sei hülfreich und gut	January 1823	G. Lange: Musikgeschichtliches (Berlin, 1900)	Baroness Cäcilie von Eskeles	HS v	

==== Folksongs ====
No.	Title	Composition, first performance	Publication	Dedication, remarks	GA	NA
WoO 152	Twenty-five Irish Songs: 1. The Return to Ulster; 2. Sweet power of song 3. Once more I hail thee 4. The morning air plays on my face 5. The Massacre of Glencoe; 6. What shall I do to shew how much I love her?; 7. His boat comes on the sunny tide 8. Come draw we round a cheerful ring 9. The Soldier's Dream; 10. The Deserter; 11. Thou emblem of faith 12. English Bulls; 13. Musing on the roaring ocean 14. Dermot and Shelah; 15. Let brain-spinning swains 16. Hide not thy anguish 17. In vain to this desert, due 18. They bid me slight my Dermot dear 19. Wife, Children and Friends; 20. Farewell bliss and farewell Nancy; 21. Morning a cruel turmoiler is 22. From Garyone, my happy home 23. A wand'ring gypsy, Sirs am I 24. The Traugh Welcome; 25. Oh harp of Erin	1810–12	London and Edinburgh, 1814		xxiv/261	
WoO 153	Twenty Irish songs: 1. When eve's last rays 2. No riches from his scanty store 3. The British Light Dragoons; 4. Since greybeards inform us 5. I dream'd I lay where flow'rs were springing 6. Sad and luckless was the season 7. O soothe me, my lyre 8. Norah of Balamagairy; 9. The kiss, dear maid, thy lip has left 10. Oh! thou hapless soldier 11. When far from the home 12. I'll praise the Saints; 13. 'Tis sunshine at last 14. Paddy O'Rafferty; 15. 'Tis but in vain 16. O might I but my Patrick love 17. Come, Darby dear 18. No more, my Mary; 19. Judy, lovely, matchless creature 20. Thy ship must sail	1810–15	London and Edinburgh, 1814 [nos. 1–4], 1816 [nos. 5–10]; GA		xxiv/262	
WoO 154	Twelve Irish songs: 1. The Elfin Fairies; 2. Oh harp of Erin; 3. The Farewell Song; 4. The pulse of an Irishman; 5. Oh! who, my dear Dermot; 6. Put round the bright wine 7. From Garyone, my happy home 8. Save me from the grave and wise 9. Oh! would I were but that sweet linnet 10. The hero may perish 11. The Soldier in a Foreign Land; 12. He promised me at parting	1812–13	(London and Edinburgh, 1816 [without nos. 2 and 7]); GA		xxiv/258	
WoO 155	Twenty-six Welsh songs: 1. Sion, the son of Evan; 2. The Monks of Bangor's March; 3. The Cottage Maid; 4. Love without Hope; 5. A golden robe my love shall wear 6. The fair Maid of Mona; 7. Oh let the night my blushes hide 8. Farewell, thou noisy town 9. To the Aeolian Harp; 10. Ned Pugh's Farewell; 11. Merch Megan; 12. Waken lords and ladies gay 13. Helpless Woman; 14. The Dream; 15. When mortals all to rest retire 16. The Damsels of Cardigan; 17. The Dairy House; 18. Sweet Richard; 19. The Vale of Clwyd; 20. To the Blackbird; 21. Cupid's Kindness; 22. Constancy; 23. The Old Strain; 24. Three Hundred Pounds; 25. The Parting Kiss; 26. Good Night	1809	London and Edinburgh, 1817		xxiii/219	xi/1
Op. 108	Twenty-five Scottish Songs: 1. Music, Love and Wine; 2. Sunset; 3. Oh! sweet were the hours 4. The Maid of Isla; 5. The sweetest lad was Jamie; 6. Dim, dim is my eye 7. Bonnie laddie, highland ladddie 8. The lovely lass of Inverness; 9. Behond my love how green the groves 10. Sympathy; 11. Oh! thou art the lad 12. Oh, had my fate 13. Come fill, fill, my good fellow 14. O, how can I be blithe 15. O cruel was my father 16. Could this ill world 17. O Mary, at thy window 18. Enchantress, farewell 19. O swiftly glides the bonny boat 20. Faithfu' Johnie; 21. Jeannie's Distress; 22. The Highland Watch; 23. The Shepherd's Song; 24. Again my lyre 25. Sally in our Alley	1815–18	London and Edinburgh, 1818		xxiv/257	xi/1
WoO 156	Twelve Scottish songs: 1. The Banner of Buccleuch; 2. Duncan Gray; 3. Up! Quit thy bower 4. Ye shepherds of this pleasant vale 5. Cease your funning 6. Highland Harry; 7. Polly Stewart; 8. Womankind; 9. Lochnagar; 10. Glencoe; 11. Auld lang syne 12. The Quaker's Wife	1815–19	London and Edinburgh, 1822 [no.1], 1824–25 [nos. 2–4, 8, 9, 12], 1839 [nos. 5–6], 1841 [nos. 7, 10, 11); GA		xxiv/260	xi/1
WoO 157	Twelve songs of various nationalities: 1. God Save the King; 2. The Soldier; 3. O Charlie is my darling 4. O sanctissima 5. The Miller of the Dee; 6. A health to the brave 7. Since all thy vows, false maid 8. By the side of the Shannon; 9. Highlander's Lament; 10. Sir Johnie Cope; 11. The wandering minstrel 12. La gondoletta	1815–20	London and Edinburgh, 1816 [nos. 2, 6, 8, 11], 1822 [no. 3], 1824–25 [no. 5], 1839 [no. 1]); GA		xxiv/259	xi/1, xi/3
WoO 158a	Twenty-three songs of various nationalities: 1. Ridder Stig tjener i Kongens Gaard; 2. Horch auf, mein Liebchen; 3. Wegen meiner bleib d'Fräula; 4. Wann i in der Früh aufsteh 5. I bin a Tyroler Bua; 6. A Madel, ja a Madel; 7. Wer solche Buema afipackt 8. Ih mag di nit 9. Oj upiłem sie w karczmie 10. Poszła baba po popiół 11. Yo no quiero embarcarme 12. Seus lindos olhos 13. Im Walde sind viele Mücklein geboren 14. Ach Bächlein, Bächlein, kühle Wasser; 15. Unsere Mädchen gingen in den Wald; 16. Schöne Minka, ich muss scheiden 17. Lilla Carl, sov sött i frid 18. An ä Bergli bin i gesässe 19. Una paloma blanca 20. Como la mariposa 21. La tirana se embarca 22. Édes kinos emlékezet 23. Da brava	1816–17	Die Musik, ii (1902–03) [no. 19], J. Schmidt-Görg: Unbekannte Manuskripte zu Beethovens weltlicher und geistlicher Gesangsmusik (Bonn, 1928) [no. 17], complete (Leipzig, 1943)		HS xiv	xi/3
WoO 158b	Seven British songs: 1. Adieu my lov'd harp 2. Castle O'Neill; 3. Oh was not I a weary wight 4. Red gleams the sun 5. Erin! oh, Erin!; 6. O Mary ye's be clad in silk 7. Lament for Owen Roe O'Neill	1813–17			HS xiv	xi/1, xi/3
WoO 158c	Six songs of various nationalities: 1. When my hero in court appears 2. Non, non, Collette n'est point trompeuse 3. Mark yonder pomp of costly fashion 4. Bonnie wee thing 5. From thee, Eliza, I must go 6. Text unidentified	1817–20			HS xiv	xi/1, xi/3
Hess 168	Air français	1817			HS xiv	xi/3
Hess 133–134	Two Austrian folksongs: 1. Das liebe Kätzchen; 2. Der Knabe auf dem Berge	1820	Niederrheinische Musikzeitung, xiii (1865)			xi/3

=== Wind band ===
No.	Title, key	Composition, first performance	Publication	Dedication, remarks	GA	NA
WoO 29	March for clarinets, horns and bassoons, B♭	1797–98	GA		xxv/292	vi/1
WoO 18	March No. 1 for Military Band Yorckscher Marsch, F	1809, rev. 1810	pf red.: Prague, ?1809; s: Berlin, 1818–19	Archduke Anton of Austria (on autograph)	xxv/287/1; HS iv; HS Viii (pf)	ii/4
	Trio to WoO 18, B♭	c. 1822	HS		HS iv	ii/4
WoO 19	March No 2. for Military Band, F	1810	pf red.: Vienna, 1810	Archduke Anton of Austria (on autograph)	xxv/287/2; HS iv	ii/4
	Trio to WoO 19, f	c. 1822	HS		HS iv	ii/4
WoO 20	March for Military Band, C	c. 1810	GA		xxv/288; HS iv	ii/4
	Trio to WoO 20, F	c. 1822			xxv/288	ii/4
WoO 21	Polonaise for Military Band, D	1810	GA		xxv/289	ii/4
WoO 22	Ecossaise for Military Band, D	1810	GA		xxv/290	ii/4
WoO 23	Ecossaise for Military Band, G	c. 1810	pf red. in Czerny's Musikalisches Pfennig-Magazin, i (Vienna, 1834)	only a piano arrangement by Carl Czerny is extant	xxv/306 (pf)	ii/4
WoO 24	March for Military Band, D	1816	pf red.: Vienna, 1827		ii/15	ii/4

=== Collections of dances ===
No.	Title	Composition, first performance	Publication	Dedication, remarks	GA	NA
WoO 7	Twelve Minuets for orchestra	1795	Vienna, 1795		ii/16	ii/3
WoO 8	Twelve German Dances for orchestra	1795	Vienna, 1795		ii/17	ii/3
WoO 9	Six minuets for two violins and double bass	?before 1795	Mainz, 1933	authenticity not fully confirmed	HS vi	ii/3
WoO 10	Six Minuets for piano	1795	Vienna, 1796	orchestral version probably existed	xviii/194	
WoO 42	Six German Dances for violin and piano	1796	Vienna, 1814		xxv/308	v/2
WoO 11	Seven Ländler for piano	1799	Vienna, 1799	version for two violins and cello probably existed	xviii/198	
WoO 13	Twelve German Dances for piano	c. 1792–97	Vienna, Prague and Leipzig, 1929	orchestral version probably existed	HS viii	
WoO 14	Twelve Contredanses for orchestra	c. 1791–1801	p: Vienna, 1802; s: GA		ii/17a	ii/3
WoO 15	Six Ländler for two violins and double bass	1802	Vienna, 1802; s: GA		xxv/291	ii/3
WoO 83	Six Ecossaises for piano	c. 1806	Vienna, 1807; GA		xxv/302	
WoO 17	Eleven "Mödlinger Tänze" for flutes, clarinets, horns, violins and double bass	1819	Leipzig, 1907	probably spurious	HS vii	

=== Canons and musical jokes ===
No.	Title, key	Composition, first performance	Publication	Dedication, remarks	GA	NA
WoO 159	Im Arm der Liebe, F	c. 1795	I. von Seyfried: Ludwig van Beethovens Studien im Generalbass (Vienna, 1832)	Contrapuntal study for Albrechtsberger	xxiii/256/1	xiii/1
WoO 160/1	O Care selve	c. 1795	Seyfried (1832)	Contrapuntal study for Albrechtsberger	HS v	xiii/1
WoO 160/2	Canon, C	c. 1795	Seyfried (1832)	Contrapuntal study for Albrechtsberger	HS v	xiii/1
	Canon	1796–97	J. Kerman, ed.: Ludwig van Beethoven: Autograph Miscellany from circa 1786 to 1799 (London, 1970)			
Hess 276	Herr Graf, ich komme zu fragen	?1797	HS		HS v	
WoO 100	Schuppanzigh ist ein Lump	1801	Grove1	for Ignaz Schuppanzigh	HS v	
WoO 101	Graf, Graf, Graf, Graf	1802	A.W. Thayer: Chronologisches Vezeichniss der Werke Ludwig van Beethoven (Berlin, 1865)	for Nikolaus Zmeskall	HS v	
Hess 274	Canon, G	1803	N. Fishman: Kniga ėskizov Bėtkhoven za 1802–1806 godï (Moscow, 1962)		HS ix	
Hess 229	Languisco e moro	1803	Fishman (1962)		HS xiv	
Hess 275	Canon, A♭	1803	HS		HS	
WoO 162	Ta ta ta...lieber Mälzel			spurious: apparently written by Anton Schindler	HS vii	
WoO 161	Ewig dein, C	?c. 1811	AMZ, new series, i (1863)		xxiii/256/14	
WoO 163	Kurz ist der Schmerz, F minor	November 1813	NZM, xi (1841),	for Friedrich Naue	xxiii/256/3a	
WoO 199	Ich bin der Herr von zu, D	1814		for Archduke Rudolph		
WoO 164	Freundschaft ist die Quelle, C	Sept 1814	GA		xxv/285/2	
WoO 165	Glück zum neuen Jahr, E♭	January 1815	Vienna, 1816	for Baron von Pasqualati	xxiii/256/16	
WoO 166	Kurz ist der Schmerz, F	March 1815	GA	for Louis Spohr	xxiii/256/3b	
WoO 167	Brauchle, Linke, C	c. 1815	Thayer, 1865	for Johann Xaver Brauchle and Joseph Linke	HS v	
WoO 168/1	Lerne schweigen, F minor	January 1816	Wiener allgemeine musikalische Zeitung, i (1816)	for Charles Neate	xxiii/256/5	
WoO 168/2	Rede, rede, F	January 1816	GA	for Charles Neate	xxiii/256/4	
WoO 169	Ich küsse Sie, C	January 1816	Die Jahrenszeien, xii/3 (1853)	for Anna Milder-Hauptmann	HS v	
WoO 170	Ars longa, vita brevis, C	April 1816	L. Nohl: Neue Briefe Beethovens (Stuttgart, 1867)	for Johann Nepomuk Hummel	HS v	
WoO 171	Glück fehl' dir vor allem, G	1817	T. von Frimmel: Neue Beethoveniana (Vienna, 1888)	for Anna Giannatasio del Rio	HS v	
WoO 172	Ich bitt' dich schrreib' mir die Es-Scala auf, E♭	?c. 1818	GA	for Vincenz Hauschka	xxiii/256/15	
WoO 201	Ich bin bereit! Amen, C	1818		for Vincenz Hauschka		
WoO 173	Hol'euch der Teufel!, B♭	sum. 1819	Thayer (1865)	for Sigmund Anton Steiner	HS v	
WoO 174	Glaube und hoffe	Sept 1819	L. Nohl: Briefe Beethovens (Stuttgart 1865)	for Maurice Schlesinger	xxv/285/3	
WoO 176	Glück zum neuen Jahr!, F	December 1819	GA	for Countess Erdődy	xxiii/256/6	
WoO 179	Alles Gute! alles Schöne, C	December 1819	Nohl (1865)	for Archduke Rudolph	xxiii/256/7	
Hess 300	Liebe mich, werter Weissenbach	? January 1820	J. Schmidt-Görg, ed.: Drei Skizzenbücher zur Missa Solemnis, i (Bonn, 1952)	for Aloys Weissenbach		
Hess 301	Wähner ... es sei kein Wahn	? January 1820	J. Schmidt-Görg, ed.: Drei Skizzenbücher zur Missa Solemnis, i (Bonn, 1952)	Friedrich Wähner		
WoO 175	Sankt Petrus war ein Fels; Bernardus war ein Sankt	? January 1820	Thayer (1865)	for Carl Peters and Carl Bernard	HS v	
WoO 180	Hoffman, sei ja kein Hofmann, C	March 1820	Caecilia, i (1825)		xxiii/256/8	
WoO 177	Bester Magistrat, Ihr friert, E	c. 1820	D. MacArdle and L. Misch: New Beethoven Letters (Norman, OK, 1957)		HS v	
WoO 178	Signor Abate, B♭	?c. 1820	GA	for the Abbé Maximilian Stadler	xxiii/256/13	
WoO 181/1	Gedenket heute an Baden, C	c. 1820	GA		xxv/285/4	
WoO 181/2	Gehabt euch wohl, C	c. 1820	Festschrift Arnold Scherings (Berlin, 1937)		HS v	
WoO 181/3	Tugent ist kein leerer Name	c. 1820			HS v	
WoO 182	O Tobias, d	Sept 1821	AMZ, new series, i (1863)	for Tobias Haslinger	xxiii/256/9	
WoO 183	Berster Herr Graf, Sie sind ein Schaf!, F	February 1823	Mf, vii (1954)	for Count Moritz Lichnowsky	HS v	
WoO 184	Falstafferel, lass' dich sehen!, G	April 1823	Die Musik, ii (1902–03)	for Schuppanzigh	HS v	
WoO 185	Edel sei der Mensch, E	? May 1823	Wiener Zeitschrift für Kunst, viii (1823)	for Louis Schlösser	xxiii/256/10	
Hess 263	Te solo adoro	?1824	HS	for Carlos Evasio Soliva	HS v	
Hess 264	Te solo adoro	?1824	HS	for Carlos Evasio Soliva	HS v	
WoO 186	Te solo adoro	June 1824	GA	for Carlos Evasio Soliva	xxv/285/1	
WoO 187	Schwenke dich ohne Schwänke!, F	November 1824	Caecilia, i/7 (1825)	for Carl Schwänke	xxiii/256/11	
WoO 188	Gott ist eine fest Burg, B♭	January 1825	F. Prelinger: Beethovens sämtliche Briefe, iv (Vienna, 1909)	for Oberst von Düsterlohe	HS v	
WoO 203	Das Schöne zu dem Guten	1825	L. Rellstab: Garten und Wald, iv (Leipzig, 1854)	for Ludwig Rellstab	HS v	
WoO 189	Doktor, sperrt das Tor dem Tod, C	May 1825	Nohl (1865)	for Anton Braunhofer	HS v	
WoO 190	Ich war hier, Doktor, C	June 1825	?HS	for Anton Braunhofer	HS v	
WoO 191	Kühl, nicht lau, B♭	Sept 1825	Seyfried (1832)	for Friedrich Kuhlau	xxiii/256/12	
WoO 192	Ars longa, vita brevis, F	Sept 1825	Thayer (1865)	for Sir George Smart	HS v	
WoO 194	Si non per portas, per muros, F	Sept 1825	Marx (1859), ii	for Maurice Schlesinger	xxiii/256/17	
WoO 195	Freu' dich des Lebens, C	December 1825	GA	for Theodor Molt	xxv/285/5	
WoO 193	Ars longa, vita brevis, C	?c. 1825	facsimile in auction catalogue no. 120 of Henrici (Berlin, 1927)		HS v	
	Bester Magistrat	?April 1826	unpublished, appears in the sketchbook 'Autograph 24'			
WoO 196	Es muss sein, F	?July 1826	A.W. Thayer: Ludwig van Beethovens Leben, ed. H. Riemann, v (Leipzig, 1908)	for "Hofkriegsagent" Dembscher	HS v	
Hess 277	Esel aller Esel	?Sept 1826	HS		HS v	
WoO 197	Da ist das Werk, C	Sept 1826	Zürich, 1949	for Holz	HS v	
WoO 198	Wir irren allesamt	December 1826	Nohl (1865)	for Holz	HS v	

=== Miscellaneous ===
No.	Title, key	Composition, first performance	Publication	Dedication, remarks	GA	NA
WoO 31	Fugue for organ, D	1783	GA		xxv/309	
	Various dances, kbd exercises, entered among sketches for larger works but probably not intended for publication	mostly 1790–98	transcr. selectively in writings of G. Nottebohm: many pubd in Kerman, ed. (I(ii)1970)		HS ix	
	Contrapuntal exercises prepared for Haydn and Albrechtsberger	1793–95	Nottebohm: Beethovens Studien (Leipzig, 1873), selective transcr.		HS vi, xiv	xiii/1
WoO 33/1	Adagio for mechanical clock, F	1799	Die Musik, i (1902)		HS vii	vi/1
WoO 33/2	Scherzo for mechanical clock, G	1799–1800	G. Becking Studien zu Betthovens Personalstil: das Scherzothema (Leipzig, 1921)		HS vii	vi/1
WoO 33/3	Allegro for mechanical clock, G	?c. 1799	Ricordiana, iii (1957)		HS vii	vi/1
WoO 33/4	Allegro for mechanical clock, C	?1794	Mainz, 1940		HS vii	vi/1
WoO 33/5	Allegretto for mechanical clock, C	?1794	Mainz, 1940		HS vii	vi/1
Hess 107	Grenadiermarsch for mechanical clock, F	?c. 1798	Beethoven-Almanach der Deutschen Musikbücherei auf das Jahr 1927 (Regensburg, 1927)	Prince Joseph Johann zu Schwarzenberg	HS vii	vi/1
WoO 99	Exercises in Italian declamation prepared for Salieri	1801–02	Nottebohm (1873) [selective]; HS i [complete]		HS i	xiii/1
WoO 58	Cadenzas to first movement and finale of Mozart's Piano Concerto No. 20 (K. 466), d	?1809	1st movt: Wiener Zeitschrift für Kunst... (23 January 1836); finale: GA;	written for Ferdinand Ries	ix/70a/11–12	vii/7
WoO 200	Theme for variations by the Archduke Rudolph, with text "O Hoffnung"	1818	Vienna, 1819			
	Various musical greetings, in letters and diaries					

== List of works by Beethoven ==
The following is a list of Beethoven's works, sorted by Opus number, followed by works listed as WoO in the Kinsky–Halm Catalogue, and then works listed in the appendix of that catalogue, which are given "Anhang" numbers. These are followed by additional works with Hess numbers listed in the catalogue of Willy Hess that are not otherwise listed in the Kinsky–Halm Catalogue. Lastly there are works with Biamonti numbers (Bia.), from the Biamonti Catalogue, an attempt to catalogue everything that Beethoven wrote in chronological order, though there are works that were not known at the time it was compiled. Thus there is no definitive catalogue of Beethoven's works to match the Deutsch catalogue for Schubert or the Köchel catalogue for Mozart.

=== Works with opus numbers ===
The opus numbers were assigned by publishers to Beethoven's works as they were published. The opus numbers do not include all works that were published in Beethoven's lifetime nor are they in chronological order. For instance, the Octet Op. 103 was written before November 1792, while Op. 102 and Op. 104 were written in 1815 and 1817 respectively.

- Op. 1: Three Piano Trios (1795)
  - No. 1: Piano Trio No. 1 in E♭ major
  - No. 2: Piano Trio No. 2 in G major
  - No. 3: Piano Trio No. 3 in C minor
- Op. 2: Three Piano Sonatas (1796)
  - No. 1: Piano Sonata No. 1 in F minor
  - No. 2: Piano Sonata No. 2 in A major
  - No. 3: Piano Sonata No. 3 in C major
- Op. 3: String Trio No. 1 in E♭ major (1794)
- Op. 4: String Quintet (Reworking of Wind Octet (Op. 103), 1795)
- Op. 5: Two Cello Sonatas (1796)
  - No. 1: Cello Sonata No. 1 in F major
  - No. 2: Cello Sonata No. 2 in G minor
- Op. 6: Sonata for Piano, Four Hands in D major (1797)
- Op. 7: Piano Sonata No. 4 in E♭ major (1797)
- Op. 8: String Trio No. 2 (Serenade) in D major (1797)
- Op. 9: Three String Trios (1798)
  - No. 1: String Trio No. 3 in G major
  - No. 2: String Trio No. 4 in D major
  - No. 3: String Trio No. 5 in C minor
- Op. 10: Three Piano Sonatas (1798)
  - No. 1: Piano Sonata No. 5 in C minor
  - No. 2: Piano Sonata No. 6 in F major
  - No. 3: Piano Sonata No. 7 in D major
- Op. 11: Piano Trio No. 4 in B♭ major ("Gassenhauer") (1797) (for clarinet (or violin), cello (sometimes bassoon), and piano)
- Op. 12: Three Violin Sonatas (1798)
  - No. 1: Violin Sonata No. 1 in D major
  - No. 2: Violin Sonata No. 2 in A major
  - No. 3: Violin Sonata No. 3 in E♭ major
- Op. 13: Piano Sonata No. 8 in C minor ("Pathetique") (1799)
- Op. 14: Two Piano Sonatas (1799)
  - No. 1: Piano Sonata No. 9 in E major (arranged for String Quartet by the composer in F major, H 34, in 1801)
  - No. 2: Piano Sonata No. 10 in G major
- Op. 15: Piano Concerto No. 1 in C major (1795)
- Op. 16: Quintet for Piano and Winds (1796) (later arranged for piano quartet)
- Op. 17: Horn Sonata in F major (1800)
- Op. 18: Six String Quartets (1800)
  - No. 1: String Quartet No. 1 in F major
  - No. 2: String Quartet No. 2 in G major
  - No. 3: String Quartet No. 3 in D major
  - No. 4: String Quartet No. 4 in C minor
  - No. 5: String Quartet No. 5 in A major
  - No. 6: String Quartet No. 6 in B♭ major
- Op. 19: Piano Concerto No. 2 in B♭ major (1795)
- Op. 20: Septet in E♭ major (1799)
- Op. 21: Symphony No. 1 in C major (1800)
- Op. 22: Piano Sonata No. 11 in B♭ major (1800)
- Op. 23: Violin Sonata No. 4 in A minor (1801)
- Op. 24: Violin Sonata No. 5 in F major ("Spring") (1801)
- Op. 25: Serenade for Flute, Violin and Viola in D major (1801)
- Op. 26: Piano Sonata No. 12 in A♭ major (1801)
- Op. 27: Two Piano Sonatas (1801)
  - No. 1: Piano Sonata No. 13 in E♭ major
  - No. 2: Piano Sonata No. 14 in C♯ minor ("Moonlight")
- Op. 28: Piano Sonata No. 15 in D major ("Pastoral") (1801)
- Op. 29: String Quintet in C major (1801)
- Op. 30: Three Violin Sonatas (1802)
  - No. 1: Violin Sonata No. 6 in A major
  - No. 2: Violin Sonata No. 7 in C minor
  - No. 3: Violin Sonata No. 8 in G major
- Op. 31: Three Piano Sonatas (1802)
  - No. 1: Piano Sonata No. 16 in G major
  - No. 2: Piano Sonata No. 17 in D minor ("Tempest")
  - No. 3: Piano Sonata No. 18 in E♭ major ("Hunt")
- Op. 32: Song "An die Hoffnung" (1805)
- Op. 33: Seven Bagatelles for piano (1802)
- Op. 34: Six variations on an original theme for piano in F major (1802)
- Op. 35: Fifteen variations and a fugue for piano on an original theme in E♭ major ("Eroica Variations") (1802)
- Op. 36: Symphony No. 2 in D major (1802)
- Op. 37: Piano Concerto No. 3 in C minor (1800)
- Op. 38: Piano Trio in E♭ major (arrangement of the Septet, Opus 20) (1803) (for clarinet (or violin), cello, and piano)
- Op. 39: Two Preludes through all twelve major keys for piano (1789)
- Op. 40: Romance for Violin and Orchestra No. 1 in G major (1802)
- Op. 41: Serenade for Piano and Flute (or Violin) in D major (1803) (Arrangement of Op. 25 Serenade for Flute, Violin and Viola)
- Op. 42: Notturno for Viola and Piano in D major (1803) (Arrangement of Opus 8 Serenade for Violin, Viola and Cello)
- Op. 43: The Creatures of Prometheus, overture and ballet music (1801)
- Op. 44: Variations on an original theme in E♭ major for piano trio (1792)
- Op. 45: Three Marches for Piano, 4 hands (1803)
- Op. 46: Song – "Adelaide" (1795)
- Op. 47: Violin Sonata No. 9 in A major ("Kreutzer") (1803)
- Op. 48: Six Songs (1802)
- Op. 49: Two Piano Sonatas (between 1795 and 1798)
  - No. 1: Piano Sonata No. 19 in G minor
  - No. 2: Piano Sonata No. 20 in G major
- Op. 50: Romance for Violin and Orchestra No. 2 in F major (1798)
- Op. 51: Two Rondos for Piano (1797)
  - No. 1: Rondo in C major
  - No. 2: Rondo in G major
- Op. 52: Eight Songs (1804–1805)
- Op. 53: Piano Sonata No. 21 in C major ("Waldstein") (1804)
- Op. 54: Piano Sonata No. 22 in F major (1804)
- Op. 55: Symphony No. 3 in E♭ major ("Eroica") (1805)
- Op. 56: Triple Concerto for violin, cello, and piano in C major (1804–1805)
- Op. 57: Piano Sonata No. 23 in F minor ("Appassionata") (1805–1806)
- Op. 58: Piano Concerto No. 4 in G major (1805–1806)
- Op. 59: Three String Quartets ("Razumovsky") (1806)
  - No. 1: String Quartet No. 7 in F major
  - No. 2: String Quartet No. 8 in E minor
  - No. 3: String Quartet No. 9 in C major
- Op. 60: Symphony No. 4 in B♭ major (1806)
- Op. 61: Violin Concerto in D major (1806)
- Op. 61a: Piano Transcription of Violin Concerto, Opus 61
- Op. 62: Coriolan Overture (1807)
- Op. 63: Arrangement of String Quintet (Opus 4) for Piano Trio (1806) (doubtful)
- Op. 64: Arrangement of String Trio (Opus 3) for Piano and Cello (1807) (spurious – author unknown)
- Op. 65: Aria: "Ah! perfido" (1796)
- Op. 66: 12 Variations for cello and piano in F major on "Ein Mädchen oder Weibchen" from Mozart's The Magic Flute (1796)
- Op. 67: Symphony No. 5 in C minor (1807–1808)
- Op. 68: Symphony No. 6 in F major ("Pastoral") (1807–1808)
- Op. 69: Cello Sonata No. 3 in A major (1808)
- Op. 70: Two Piano Trios (1808)
  - No. 1: Piano Trio No. 5 in D major ("Ghost")
  - No. 2: Piano Trio No. 6 in E♭ major

Sextet, Op. 71
1st movement: Adagio – Allegro

2nd movement: Adagio

3rd movement: Menuetto quasi allegretto

4th movement: Rondo – Allegro

- Op. 71: Wind sextet in E♭ (1796)
- Op. 72: Fidelio, opera (c. 1803–05; Fidelio Overture composed 1814)
- Op. 72a: Leonore (earlier version of Fidelio, with Leonore Overture No. 2) (1805)
- Op. 72b: Leonore (earlier version of Fidelio, with Leonore Overture No. 3) (1806)
- Op. 73: Piano Concerto No. 5 in E♭ major ("Emperor") (1809)
- Op. 74: String Quartet No. 10 in E♭ major ("Harp") (1809)
- Op. 75: Six Songs (1809)
- Op. 76: Six variations on an original theme for piano in D major (includes the Turkish March from The Ruins of Athens) (1809)
- Op. 77: Piano Fantasia in G minor (1809)
- Op. 78: Piano Sonata No. 24 in F♯ major (1809)
- Op. 79: Piano Sonata No. 25 in G major (1809)
- Op. 80: "Choral Fantasy" (Fantasia in C minor for piano, chorus, and orchestra) (1808)
- Op. 81a: Piano Sonata No. 26 in E♭ major ("Les Adieux") (1809)
- Op. 81b: Sextet in E♭ major (1795)
- Op. 82: Four Ariettas and a Duet (1809)
- Op. 83: Three Songs (1810)
- Op. 84: Egmont, overture and incidental music (1810)
- Op. 85: Oratorio: Christus am Ölberge (Christ on the Mount of Olives) (1803)
- Op. 86: Mass in C major (1807)
- Op. 87: Trio for two Oboes and English Horn in C major (1795)
- Op. 88: Song: "Das Glück der Freundschaft" (1803)
- Op. 89: Polonaise in C major (1814)
- Op. 90: Piano Sonata No. 27 in E minor (1814)
- Op. 91: Wellington's Victory ("Battle Symphony") (1813)
- Op. 92: Symphony No. 7 in A major (1812)
- Op. 93: Symphony No. 8 in F major (1812)
- Op. 94: Song "An die Hoffnung" (1814)
- Op. 95: String Quartet No. 11 in F minor ("Serioso") (1810)
- Op. 96: Violin Sonata No. 10 in G major (1812)
- Op. 97: Piano Trio No. 7 in B♭ major ("Archduke") (1811)
- Op. 98: An die ferne Geliebte, song cycle (1816)
- Op. 99: Song "Der Mann von Wort" (1816)
- Op. 100: Song "Merkenstein" (1814, about the Merkenstein ruins)
- Op. 101: Piano Sonata No. 28 in A major (1816)
- Op. 102: Two Cello Sonatas (1815)
  - No. 1: Cello Sonata No. 4 in C major
  - No. 2: Cello Sonata No. 5 in D major.
- Op. 103: Octet in E♭ (1792)
- Op. 104: String Quintet (arrangement of Piano Trio No. 3, 1817)
- Op. 105: Six National Airs with Variations for Flute (or Violin) and Piano (1819)
- Op. 106: Piano Sonata No. 29 in B♭ major ("Hammerklavier") (1818)
- Op. 107: Ten National Airs with Variations for Flute (or Violin) and Piano (1820)
- Op. 108: Twenty-Five Scottish Songs (1818)
- Op. 109: Piano Sonata No. 30 in E major (1820)
- Op. 110: Piano Sonata No. 31 in A♭ major (1821)
- Op. 111: Piano Sonata No. 32 in C minor (1822)
- Op. 112: Meeresstille und glückliche Fahrt (Calm Sea and Prosperous Voyage), for chorus and orchestra (1815)
- Op. 113: Die Ruinen von Athen (The ruins of Athens), overture and incidental music (1811)
- Op. 114: March and Chorus for Die Weihe des Hauses (The Consecration of the House) from Die Ruinen von Athen (The ruins of Athens) (1822)
- Op. 115: Zur Namensfeier (Feastday), overture (1815)
- Op. 116: "Tremate, empi, tremate", vocal trio with orchestra (1802)
- Op. 117: König Stephan (King Stephen), overture and incidental music (1811)
- Op. 118: "Elegischer Gesang" for four voices and string quartet (1814)
- Op. 119: Eleven new Bagatelles for piano (1822)
- Op. 120: Thirty-three variations on a waltz by Diabelli for piano in C major ("Diabelli Variations") (1823)
- Op. 121a: Kakadu Variations, for Piano Trio (Variations on "Ich bin der Schneider Kakadu") (1803)
- Op. 121b: "Opferlied" for soprano, chorus and orchestra (1822)
- Op. 122: "Bundeslied" for soprano, alto, chorus and wind instruments (1824)
- Op. 123: Missa solemnis in D major (1823)
- Op. 124: Die Weihe des Hauses (The Consecration of the House), overture and incidental music (1822)
- Op. 125: Symphony No. 9 in D minor ("Choral") (1824)
- Op. 126: Six Bagatelles for piano (1824)
- Op. 127: String Quartet No. 12 in E♭ major (1825)
- Op. 128: Song: "Der Kuss" (1822)
- Op. 129: Rondo à Capriccio for piano in G major ("Rage over a lost penny") (1795)
- Op. 130: String Quartet No. 13 in B♭ major (1825–1826)
- Op. 131: String Quartet No. 14 in C♯ minor (1826)
- Op. 132: String Quartet No. 15 in A minor (1825)
- Op. 133: Große Fuge in B♭ major for string quartet (originally finale of Opus 130) (1825)
- Op. 134: Piano arrangement (4 hands) of the Große Fuge, Opus 133 (1826)
- Op. 135: String Quartet No. 16 in F major (1826)
- Op. 136: Cantata: Der glorreiche Augenblick (1814)
- Op. 137: Fugue for String Quintet in D major (1817)
- Op. 138: Leonore, opera (earlier version of Fidelio, with Leonore Overture No. 1) (1807)

=== Works with WoO numbers ===
The numbers and categories used below are from the Kinsky–Halm Catalogue of 1955. WoO is an abbreviation of "Werke ohne Opuszahl", German for "Works without Opus number". While some of these works were published during Beethoven's lifetime but not given opus numbers, for instance the piano variations WoO 80, others like Für Elise WoO 59 were not published until later. Unlike with opus numbers which were assigned depending on when the works were published, WoO numbers were assigned by genre.

==== Instrumental works: WoO 1–86 ====
===== Orchestral works =====
Orchestra alone

- WoO 1: Musik zu einem Ritterballett (Music for a ballet on horseback) (1790–01)
- WoO 2a: Triumphal March for orchestra for Christoph Kuffner's tragedy Tarpeja (1813)
- WoO 2b: Introduction to Act II of Leonore (1805)
- WoO 3: "Gratulations-Menuett", minuet for orchestra (1822)

Concertante

- WoO 4: Piano Concerto No. 0 in E♭ major (solo part only with indications of orchestration) (1784)
- WoO 5: Violin Concerto movement in C major, fragment (1790–92)
- WoO 6: Rondo in B♭ major for piano and orchestra, possibly part of initial version of the Piano Concerto No. 2 (1793)

Dances

- WoO 7: Twelve minuets for orchestra (later arranged for piano, Hess 101) (1795)
- WoO 8: Twelve German Dances for orchestra (later arranged for piano, Hess 100) (1795)
- WoO 9: Six minuets for two violins and double bass (authenticity not fully confirmed) (?before 1795)
- WoO 10: Six minuets for orchestra (original version lost, only an arrangement for piano is extant) (1795)
- WoO 11: Seven Ländler for two violins and cello (original version lost, only an arrangement for piano is extant) (1799)
- WoO 12: Twelve minuets for orchestra (spurious, actually by Beethoven's brother Carl) (1799)
- WoO 13: Twelve German Dances for orchestra (original version lost, only an arrangement for piano is extant) (1792–97)
- WoO 14: Twelve contredanses for orchestra (nos. 1–2, 4–5, 7–10, 12, later arranged for piano, Hess 102) (1791–1801)
- WoO 15: Six Ländler for two violins and double bass (later arranged for piano) (1802)
- WoO 16: Twelve Écossaises for orchestra (fraudulent) (1806)
- WoO 17: Eleven "Mödlinger Tänze" for seven instruments (probably spurious) (1819)

Marches and dances for winds

March in D major, or Great March in D (WoO 24)
Performed by the U.S. Marine Band

- WoO 18: March for Military Band "Für die Böhmische Landwehr" ["For the Bohemian Ward"] (later arranged for piano, Hess 99) (1809)
- WoO 19: March for Military Band "Pferdemusik" ["Horse-music"] (1810)
- WoO 20: March for Military Band "Zapfenstreich" ["The Tattoo"] (1810)
- WoO 21: Polonaise for Military Band (1810)
- WoO 22: Écossaise for Military Band (1810)
- WoO 23: Écossaise for Military Band (only a piano arrangement by Carl Czerny is extant) (1810)
- WoO 24: March for Military Band (1816)

===== Chamber works =====
Without piano

Rondino in E♭ major, WoO 25
Performed by Kevin MacLeod

- WoO 25: Rondo for wind octet (believed to be the original finale of the Octet, opus 103) (1792)
- WoO 26: Duo for two flutes (1792)
- WoO 27: Three duets for clarinet and bassoon (probably spurious)
- WoO 28: Variations for two oboes and English horn on "Là ci darem la mano" from Mozart's opera Don Giovanni (1795)
- WoO 29: March for Wind Sextet in B♭ (1797–98)
- WoO 30: Three Equale for four trombones (vocal arrangements of these were performed at Beethoven's funeral) (1812)
- WoO 31: Fugue for organ (1783)
- WoO 32: Duo for viola and cello, "mit zwei obligaten Augengläsern" ("with two obbligato eyeglasses") (1796–97)
- WoO 33: Five pieces for mechanical clock (1794–1800)
- WoO 34: Duet for two violins (1822)
- WoO 35: Canon for two violins (1825)

With piano

- WoO 36: Three piano quartets (1785)
- WoO 37: Trio for piano, flute, and bassoon in G major (1786)
- WoO 38: Piano Trio in E♭ major (Piano Trio No. 8) (1791)
- WoO 39: Allegretto for piano trio in B♭ major (1812)
- WoO 40: Twelve variations for piano and violin on "Se vuol ballare" from Mozart's The Marriage of Figaro (1792–93)
- WoO 41: Rondo for piano and violin in G major (1793–94)
- WoO 42: Six German Dances for violin and piano (1796)
- WoO 43a: Sonatina for mandolin and piano (1796)
- WoO 43b: Adagio for mandolin and piano (1796)
- WoO 44a: Sonatina for mandolin and piano (1796)
- WoO 44b: Andante and variations for mandolin and piano (1796)
- WoO 45: Twelve Variations for cello and piano on "See, the conqu'ring hero comes" from Handel's Judas Maccabaeus (1796)
- WoO 46: Seven Variations for cello and piano in E♭ major on "Bei Männern welche Liebe fühlen" from Mozart's The Magic Flute (1801)

===== Piano works for 2 or 4 hands =====
Sonatas and single-movement works

- WoO 47: Three piano sonatas (E♭ major, F minor, D major) ("Kurfürsten Sonatas") (1783)
- WoO 48: Rondo for piano in C major (1783)
- WoO 49: Rondo for piano in A major (1783)
- WoO 50: Piano Sonatina in F major (1790–92, two movements)
- WoO 51: Piano Sonata in C major (1797–98, fragment) completed by Ferdinand Ries, 1830
- WoO 52: Presto (Bagatelle) for piano in C minor (1795)
- WoO 53: Allegretto (Bagatelle) for piano in C minor (1796–97)
- WoO 54: Lustig-Traurig (Bagatelle) for piano in C major (1802)
- WoO 55: Prelude for piano in F minor (1803)
- WoO 56: Allegretto (Bagatelle) for piano in C major (1803)
- WoO 57: Andante favori – original middle movement from Piano Sonata No. 21 (Waldstein) (1805)
- WoO 58: Cadenzas for 1st and 3rd movements of Mozart's D minor Piano Concerto (K. 466) (1809)
- WoO 59: Poco moto (Bagatelle) for piano in A minor ("Für Elise") (c. 1810)
- WoO 60: Ziemlich lebhaft (Bagatelle) for piano in B♭ major (1818))
- WoO 61: Allegretto for piano in B minor (1821)
- WoO 61a: Allegretto quasi andante for piano in G minor (1825)
- WoO 62: String Quintet in C major (fragment, piano transcription)

Variations

- WoO 63: Nine variations for piano on a march by Ernst Christoph Dressler (1782)
- WoO 64: Six Variations on a Swiss song for piano or harp (1790–1792)
- WoO 65: Twenty-four variations for piano on Vincenzo Righini's aria "Venni Amore" (1790–1791)
- WoO 66: Thirteen variations for piano on the aria "Es war einmal ein alter Mann" from Carl Ditters von Dittersdorf's opera Das rote Käppchen (1792)
- WoO 67: Eight variations for piano four hands on a theme by Count Waldstein (1792)
- WoO 68: Twelve variations for piano on the "Menuet a la Vigano" from Jakob Haibel's ballet Le nozze disturbate (1795)
- WoO 69: Nine variations for piano on "Quant'e piu bello" from Giovanni Paisiello's opera La Molinara (1795)
- WoO 70: Six variations for piano on "Nel cor più non mi sento" from Giovanni Paisiello's opera La Molinara (1795)
- WoO 71: Twelve variations for piano on the Russian dance from Paul Wranitzky's ballet Das Waldmädchen (1796–1797)
- WoO 72: Eight variations for piano on "Une Fièvre Brûlante" from André Grétry's opera Richard Coeur-de-lion (1795)
- WoO 73: Ten variations for piano on "La stessa, la stessissima" from Antonio Salieri's opera Falstaff (1799)
- WoO 74: "Ich denke dein" – song with six variations for piano four hands (1799)
- WoO 75: Seven variations for piano on "Kind, willst du ruhig schlafen" from Peter Winter's opera Das unterbrochene Opferfest (1799)
- WoO 76: Eight variations for piano on "Tändeln und scherzen" from Franz Xaver Süssmayr's opera Soliman II (1799)
- WoO 77: Six easy variations on an original theme for piano (1800)
- WoO 78: Seven variations for piano on "God Save the King" (1802–1803)
- WoO 79: Five variations for piano on "Rule, Britannia!" (1803)
- WoO 80: Thirty-two variations on an original theme in C minor for piano (1806)

32 Variations in C minor, WoO 80

Dances

Écossaise in E♭ major, WoO 86

- WoO 81: Allemande for piano in A major (1793)
- WoO 82: Minuet for piano in E♭ major (1803)
- WoO 83: Six Écossaises for piano in E♭ major (1806)
- WoO 84: Waltz for piano in E♭ major (1824)
- WoO 85: Waltz for piano in D major (1825)
- WoO 86: Écossaise for piano in E♭ major (1825)

==== Vocal works: WoO 87–205 ====
===== Cantatas, choruses and arias with orchestra =====
- WoO 87: Cantata on the Death of Emperor Joseph II (1790)
- WoO 88: Cantata on the Accession of Emperor Leopold II (1790)
- WoO 89: Aria "Prüfung des Küssens" (1790–92)
- WoO 90: Aria "Mit Mädeln sich vertragen" (1790–92)
- WoO 91: Two arias for Die Schöne Schusterin (1795–96)
- WoO 92: Aria "Primo Amore" (1790–92)
- WoO 92a: Aria "No, non turbati" (1802)
- WoO 93: Duet "Nei giorni tuoi felici" (1802)
- WoO 94: "Germania", aria with chorus in B♭ major (1814)
- WoO 95: Chorus for the Congress of Vienna (1815)
- WoO 96: Incidental Music to Leonore Prohaska (1815)
- WoO 97: "Es ist vollbracht" for Die Ehrenpforten (1815)
- WoO 98: "Wo sich die Pulse", chorus for The Consecration of the House (1822)

===== Works for multiple voices with piano accompaniment, or unaccompanied =====
- WoO 99 – Polyphonic songs (Italian part-songs)
  - No. 1 Bei labbri che amore (Hess 211) (old no. 1)
  - No. 2 Ma tu tremi (Hess 212) (old no. 6)
  - No. 3 E pur fra le tempeste (Hess 232)
  - No. 4 Sei mio ben (Hess 231)
  - No. 5a Giura il nocchier (Hess 227) (old no. 5b)
  - No. 5b Giura il nocchier (Hess 230)
  - No. 5c Giura il nocchier (Hess 221) (old no. 5a)
  - No. 6 Ah rammenta
  - No. 7 Chi mai di questo core (Hess 214) (old no. 2)
  - No. 8 Scrivo in te (Hess 215) (old no. 11)
  - No. 9 Per te d'amico aprile (Hess 216) (old no. 9)
  - No. 10a Nei campi e nelle selve (Hess 217) (old no. 7a)
  - No. 10b Nei campi e nelle selve (Hess 220) (old no. 7b)
  - No. 11a Fra tutte le pene (Hess 208) (old no. 3a)
  - No. 11b Fra tutte le pene (Hess 225/209) (old no. 3b)
  - No. 11c Fra tutte le pene (Hess 224/210) (old no. 3c)
  - No. 12a Salvo tu vuoi lo sposo
  - No. 12b Salvo tu vuoi lo sposo (Hess 228)
  - No. 13a Quella cetra ah pur tu sei (Hess 218) (old no. 10b)
  - No. 13b Quella cetra ah pur tu sei (Hess 219) (old no. 10c)
  - No. 13c Quella cetra ah pur tu sei (Hess 213) (old no. 10a)
  - No. 14a Gia la notte savvicina (Hess 223) (old no. 4b)
  - No. 14b Gia la notte savvicina (Hess 222) (old no. 4a)
  - No. 15 Silvio amante disperato (lost) (Hess 226) (old no. 12)
- WoO 100: Musical joke for three voices "Lob auf den Dicken"
- WoO 101: Musical joke for three voices and chorus "Graf, Graf, liebster Graf"
- WoO 102: Chorus for male voices "Abschiedsgesang"
- WoO 103: Cantata Un lieto Brindisi
- WoO 104: "Gesang der Mönche" from Schiller's Wilhelm Tell for three male voices
- WoO 105: Song for solo voice, chorus and piano "Hochzeitslied"
- WoO 106: Birthday Cantata for Prince Lobkowitz

===== Lieder and songs for solo voice and piano =====
- WoO 107–151: Forty-five songs

===== Folksong arrangements for one or more voices, with piano trio accompaniment =====
- WoO 152: Twenty-five Irish folksongs
- WoO 153: Twenty Irish folksongs
- WoO 154: Twelve Irish folksongs
- WoO 155: Twenty-six Welsh folksongs
- WoO 156: Twelve Scottish folksongs
- WoO 157: Twelve folksongs of various nationalities
- WoO 158a: Twenty-three continental folksongs
- WoO 158b: Seven British folksongs
- WoO 158c: Six assorted folksongs
- WoO 158d: "Air Français"

===== Vocal canons =====
- WoO 159–198: Forty Canons

===== Musical jokes, quips, and dedications =====
- WoO 199: Musical joke "Ich bin der Herr von zu"
- WoO 200: Piano Exercise "O Hoffnung!"
- WoO 201: Musical joke "Ich bin bereit!"
- WoO 202: Riddle canon "Das Schöne zu dem Guten" (first version)
- WoO 203: Riddle canon "Das Schöne zu dem Guten" (second version)
- WoO 204: Musical joke "Holz, Holz, Geigt die Quartette So" (Spurious, actually composed by Karl Holz)
- WoO 205: Ten musical quips (Kinsky's word is "Notenscherze") from Beethoven's letters

==== Added works: WoO 206–228 ====
The 2014 revision to the Kinsky catalogue, edited by Dorfmüller, Gertsch and Ronge, assigned WoO numbers to a number of works that appear in other listings.

- WoO 206: Oboe Concerto in F major (lost; only incipits and draft of 2nd movement extant) (Hess 12)
- WoO 207: Romance cantabile for soloists and orchestra (Hess 13)
- WoO 208: Wind Quintet in E♭ (fragment) (Hess 19)
- WoO 209: Minuet in A♭ for string quartet (Hess 33, piano version Hess 88)
- WoO 210: Allegretto for string quartet in B minor (Pencarrow Quartet, Gardi 16)
- WoO 211: Andante in C major (Biamonti 52)
- WoO 212: Anglaise for piano in D major (Hess 61)
- WoO 213a: Andante (bagatelle) in D♭ major (Biamonti 283)
- WoO 213b: Finale (bagatelle) in G major (Biamonti 282)
- WoO 213c: Allegro (bagatelle) in A major (second part of the Allegro in A♭ and A, Biamonti 284)
- WoO 213d: Rondo (bagatelle) in A major (Biamonti 275)
- WoO 214: Allegretto (bagatelle) in C minor (Hess 69)
- WoO 215: Fugue in C major (Hess 64)
- WoO 216a: Bagatelle in C major for piano (Hess 73)
- WoO 216b: Bagatelle in E♭ major (Hess 74)
- WoO 217: Minuet in F major (Biamonti 66)
- WoO 218: Minuet in C major (Biamonti 74)

Ländler in C minor, WoO 219

- WoO 219: Waltz or Ländler in C minor (Hess 68)
- WoO 220: Kriegslied für die verbündeten Heere (lost) (Hess 123)
- WoO 221: Canon, Herr Graf (Hess 276)
- WoO 222: Canon in A♭ major (Hess 275, Hess 328)
- WoO 223: Thut auf (Biamonti 752)
- WoO 224: Cacatum non est Pictum (Gardi 9)
- WoO 225: Grossen Dank für solche Gnade (Hess 303)
- WoO 226: Fettlümerl und Bankert haben triumphirt (Hess 260)
- WoO 227: Musical joke "Esel aller Esel" (Hess 277)
- WoO 228a: Musical joke "Ah, Tobias" (Gardi 14)
- WoO 228b: Musical joke "Tobias" (Hess 285)

==== Works with Anhang (Anh.) and Unvollendete (Unv.) numbers ====
These are works from the Appendix (Anhang in German) of Kinsky's catalog that were attributed to Beethoven at the time the catalog was compiled, but might not have been written by him. The 2014 revision to the Kinsky catalogue, edited by Dorfmüller, Gertsch and Ronge also introduced the category of Unvollendete (unfinished works), for several works that had previously appeared in other listings.

- Anh. 1: Symphony in C major ("Jena Symphony") (spurious, actually composed by Friedrich Witt)
- Anh. 2: Six string quartets (doubtful; possible authorship by Kaspar Anton Karl van Beethoven or Johann Baptist Wanhal has been suggested)
- Anh. 3: Piano trio in D major (spurious, actually composed by Beethoven's brother Karl)
- Anh. 4: Sonata for piano and flute in B♭ major (not certain)
- Anh. 5: Two piano sonatinas (probably spurious)
  1. Sonatina in G major
  2. Sonatina in F major
- Anh. 6: Rondo for piano in B♭ major (spurious, actually composed by Beethoven's brother Karl)
- Anh. 7: Piano concerto (Allegro) in D major (first movement) (probably by Johann Joseph Rösler)
- Anh. 8: Three pieces for piano four-hands (spurious, actually composed by Leopold Anton Koželuch)
- Anh. 9: Nine German dances for piano four-hands (probably doubtful)
- Anh. 10: Eight variations on the song "Ich hab'ein kleines Hüttchen nur" for piano in B♭ major (doubtful)
- Anh. 11: "Alexandermarsch" for Louis Duport ballet "Der blode Ritter" march for piano in F major (probably doubtful)
- Anh. 12: "Pariser Einzugsmarsch" march for piano in C major (spurious, actually composed by Johann Heinrich Walch)
- Anh. 13: Funeral march for piano in F minor (spurious, actually composed by Johann Heinrich Walch, but still popularly called "Beethoven's Funeral March" in the UK; where it is famously played during the Remembrance Sunday service at the Cenotaph)
- Anh. 14: Six piano waltzes (probably spurious)
- Anh. 15: "Glaube, Liebe, und Hoffnung" waltz for piano in F major, most known as "Adieu to the piano" (probably doubtful)
- Anh. 16: Four piano waltzes
  1. "Jubelwalzer" waltz for piano in C♯ major (probably doubtful)
  2. "Gertruds Traumwalzer" waltz for piano in B♭ major, most known as "Gertrude's Dream Waltz" (spurious, author unknown)
  3. "Sonnenscheinwalzer" waltz for piano in E♭ major (probably doubtful)
  4. "Mondscheinwalzer" waltz for piano in A♭ major (probably doubtful)
- Anh. 17: "Introduction and Waltz (Klavierstück)" waltz for piano in F major (probably doubtful)
- Anh. 18: "An Sie" or "Nachruf" song in A♭ major (Voice and Piano or Guitar) (probably doubtful)
- Unv. 1 Symphony in C minor = Hess 298
- Unv. 2 Sketches for a symphony in C (parts of which were reused for Symphony #1) = Biamonti 73
- Unv. 3 Symphony No. 10 = Biamonti 838
- Unv. 4 Sketches for a BACH Overture = Biamonti 832
- Unv. 5 Concertante in D = Gardi 3
- Unv. 6 Piano Concerto #6 in D = Hess 15
- Unv. 7 String Quintet movement in D minor = Hess 40
- Unv. 8 Duo for Violin and Cello in E♭ = Gardi 2
- Unv. 9 Allegretto in E♭ for Piano Trio = Hess 48
- Unv. 10 Piano Trio in F minor = Biamonti 637
- Unv. 11 Violin Sonata in A = Hess 46
- Unv. 12 Fantasia/Piano Sonata in D = Biamonti 213
- Unv. 13 Piano Sonata in E♭ (found at Fischhof 42v, previously uncatalogued)
- Unv. 14 Variations for Piano in A (found at Fischhof 25v through 26v, previously uncatalogued)
- Unv. 15 Opera, Vestas Feuer = Hess 115
- Unv. 16 Opera, Macbeth = Biamonti 454 (Beethoven is believed to have intended to write the opera Macbeth; a performing version of possible sketches was assembled by Albert Willem Holsbergen between 1999 and 2001. The premiere performance of the Beethoven Macbeth Overture was by the National Symphony Orchestra on September 20–22, 2001, under the direction of Leonard Slatkin).
- Unv. 17 Cantata, Europens Befreiungsstunde = Hess 317
- Unv. 18 Östreich über alles, Song for Chorus and Orchestra, Biamonti 477
- Unv. 19 Cantata for voice and piano in B♭, (found in Fischhof f.1v, Kafka f.100r and a.66 f.1r. previously uncatalogued)
- Unv. 20 Lamentations of Jeremiah = Gardi 4
- Unv. 21 Song, "Traute Henriette" = Hess 151
- Unv. 22 Song, "Rastlose Liebe" = Hess 149
- Unv. 23 Song, "Heidenröslein" = Hess 150

=== Works with Hess numbers ===
==== Works with Hess number ====
These works have numbers that were assigned by Willy Hess in his catalogue of Beethoven's works. Many of the works in the Hess catalog also have WoO or Unv. numbers; those entries are not listed here.

- Hess 1: Original ending to first movement of Symphony No. 8 (1812)
- Hess 3: Twelve Ecossaise for piano or orchestra
- Hess 11: Romance No. 3 for violin & orchestra (1816)
- Hess 14: Fragment of original version of Piano Concerto No. 2 (1794–95)
- Hess 16: Original introduction to the Choral Fantasy (1808)
- Hess 25: String Trio, Op. 3 (first version) (1793)
- Hess 28: Movement in A♭ major for string trio, Op. 9, No. 1 (second trio to the Scherzo) (1797)
- Hess 29–31: Preludes and Fugues for Albrechtsberger (1794–95)
- Hess 32: String Quartet in F major (first version of Op. 18, No. 1) (1799)
- Hess 34: String Quartet in F major (arrangement of Op. 14, No. 1) (1801–02)
- Hess 35: Bach fugue arranged for string quartet (fragment) (1817)
- Hess 36: Handel fugue arranged for string quartet (1798)
- Hess 37: Mozart fugue arranged for piano four hands

Fugue arranged for string quintet, H 38
Arrangement of Bach's fugue

- Hess 38: Bach fugue arranged for string quintet (1801–02)
- Hess 39: String Quintet in F major (lost)
- Hess 40: Prelude for String Quintet (incomplete) (1817)
- Hess 44: Adagio ma non troppo for mandolin & harpsichord in E♭ major
- Hess 46: Violin Sonata in A major (fragment) (c.1790)
- Hess 47: Allegro con brio in E♭ major for piano trio (arrangement of String Trio, Op. 3)
- Hess 49: Piano Trio in E♭ major (1786)
- Hess 50: Piano Trio in B♭ major (1786)
- Hess 52: Piano Sonata in C major
- Hess 54: Piano variations on Freudvoll und Liedvoll
- Hess 57: Bagatelle in C major (1824)
- Hess 58: Piano Exercise in B♭ major (1800)
- Hess 59: Piano Exercise in C (1792–1800)
- Hess 60: Draft in A for Piano (1793)
- Hess 63: Arrangement of Christian Friedrich Daniel Schubart's "Kaplied" for piano (1789)
- Hess 64: Fugue in C for Piano (1794–1795)
- Hess 65: Concerto excerpt (arrangement of Op. 37) (1820–01)
- Hess 66: Allegretto in C minor (1796–97)
- Hess 67: Two German dances for piano (1811)
- Hess 69: Allegretto for piano in C minor (1794)
- Hess 70: Adagio for piano in G major (1803–04)
- Hess 71: Molto adagio for piano in G major (1803–04)
- Hess 72: Variations for piano in A major (1803)
- Hess 76–83: Cadenzas for Piano
- Hess 84: Piano cadenza for Op. 61a (1807)
- Hess 85: Piano cadenza for Op. 61a (1809)
- Hess 87: Grenadiermarsch for piano (arrangement of WoO 29) (1797–98)
- Hess 88: Minuet for piano (arrangement of WoO 209) (1790–92)
- Hess 89: Ritterballet for piano (arrangement of WoO 1) (1791)
- Hess 90: The Creatures of Prometheus for piano (arrangement of Op. 43) (1801)
- Hess 91–95: Five Songs
- Hess 96: Fragment of Symphony No. 7 for piano (1813)
- Hess 97: Wellington's Victory for piano and two cannons (arrangement of Op. 91) (1816)
- Hess 98: Scherzo for piano (1794–99)
- Hess 99: Yorckscher Marsch (piano arrangement of WoO 18) (1809–10)
- Hess 100: Twelve German dances (piano arrangement of WoO 8) (1795)
- Hess 101: Twelve Minuets (piano arrangement of WoO 7) (1795)
- Hess 102: Nine contredanses (piano arrangement of nos. 1–2, 4–5, 7–10, 12 from Twelve contredanses for orchestra WoO 14) (1791–1801)
- Hess 107: Grenadiermarsch (musical clock arrangement of WoO 29) (1798)
- Hess 108: Wellington's Victory (panharmonicon arrangement of the second part of Op. 91) (1813)
- Hess 110–114: Parts from 'Leonore
- Hess 116: Fragment for Solo Voice(s): "Ritterblatt"
- Hess 118: Music for The Consecration of the House (from Op. 113) (1822)
- Hess 121–122: Arias from Leonore
- Hess 123–147: Songs
- Hess 152–207: Folksong settings
- Hess 208–232: Italian partsongs
- Hess 233–246: Counterpoint exercises
- Hess 254: Canon in G major: "Hol dich der Teufel" (1801)
- Hess 263–264: Two canons
- Hess 274: Canons in G major (1803)
- Hess 296: Little Cadenza for Instrument(s) (1822)
- Hess 297: Adagio for three horns (1815)
- Hess 299–305: Sketches for canons
- Hess 306–309: Four canons
- Hess 310: Prelude in C for Organ
- Hess 311–312: Two canons
- Hess 313: Song: "Te solo adoro" (1824)
- Hess 314: Funeral Cantata (1781)
- Hess 315: Fugue
- Hess 316: Quintet (1793)
- Hess 318–319: String Quintets
- Hess 320: Andante for String Quartet in G major (1815)
- Hess 321–324: Melodies
- Hess 325: Piece for piano in D major (1802)
- Hess 326: Fugue for piano in C major (1800–01)
- Hess 327: Two little melodies (1803)
- Hess 329–330: Sketches
- Hess 331: Minuet for piano in B♭ major
- Hess 332: Pastorella for String Quartet in D major (1799)
- Hess 333: Minuet-Scherzo for String Quartet in A major (1799)
- Hess 334: Draft for String Quartet in A major (1799)
- Hess 335: Two exercises on the song "Gedenke Mein"

==== Works with Hess Anhang (Anh.) numbers ====
These are works included in the appendix of Hess's catalogue that might not be genuine works by Beethoven.

- Anh. 3: Marches zur großen Wachtparade (not certain)
- Anh. 4: Marsch in geschwinden tempo (not certain)
- Anh. 5: Twelve waltzes for 2 Violins and Bass, with 2 Flutes and 2 Horns ad libitum (not certain) (1807)
- Anh. 8: Quintet for Flute, Violin, 2 Violas, and Cello (not certain)
- Anh. 9: Sonata for 2 Violins and Cello (not certain)
- Anh. 10: Andante favori for string quartet (arrangement of WoO 57) (not certain)
- Anh. 17: Adagio and Andante for violin and piano (not certain)
- Anh. 21: Bagatelle "An Laura" for piano (arrangement of WoO 112) (doubtful)
- Anh. 22: Funeral March in C Minor (not certain)
- Anh. 38–56: Songs (not certain)
- Anh. 57: Fugue "Dona nobis pacem" (now thought genuine) (1795)
- Anh. 58: Bundeslied (not certain)
- Anh. 59: Folksong "As I was wandering" (not certain)
- Anh. 60: Canon in C major (probably spurious)
- Anh. 61–62: Canons (spurious)
- Anh. 63–64: Canons (not certain)
- Anh. 65: Cantata Karfreitagskantate (not certain)
- Anh. 66: Two fragments for chorus (not certain)

=== Works with Biamonti numbers ===
The Italian musicologist Giovanni Biamonti compiled a chronological catalogue of Beethoven's entire output known at the time, including sketches and fragments. While most of these works were already included in other catalogues, there were some that had been missed by earlier compilers. This list does not include works with opus, WoO or Hess numbers, nor does it include sketches.

- Bia 15: Song "Der Arme Componist" (1788–91)
- Bia 16: Cello part to the Lost Cadenza for Leopold Cantata WoO 88
- Bia 43: Song "Meine Mutter fragt mich immer: trinkst du?"
- Bia 48: Anglaise for piano for G minor (1792)
- Bia 238: Presto in F major (1800)
- Bia 249: Minuet for orchestra in D major (1800)
- Bia 277: Presto for piano in G major (1793)
- Bia 279: Allegro for piano in C major (1793)
- Bia 291: Andante, for a symphony (1801)
- Bia 292: March with variations (1801)
- Bia 319: Finale for piano (1802)
- Bia 322: Piece for piano in C minor (1802)
- Bia 323: Piece for piano (1802)
- Bia 346: Fuga Antique for piano in C major (1803)
- Bia 347: Passage for piano through all the keys (1803)
- Bia 359: Rondo for "all the instruments" (1803)
- Bia 380: Song "Zur Erde sank die Ruh' vom Himmel nieder" (1803)
- Bia 383: Exercise for piano
- Bia 389: Piece for viola, cello, horn and double bass (1803)
- Bia 392: Rondo for piano (1803)
- Bia 447: Passage for piano (1808)
- Bia 547: Symphony No. 8 with the original ending of Hess 1 (1812)
- Bia 606: Andante for pizzicati basses with clarinets in B minor (1815)
- Bia 621: Allemande for piano (1815)
- Bia 622: Pastorella for piano in C major (1815)
- Bia 624: Etude, study of prosody on a text of Homer (1815)
- Bia 632: Song "Die Zufrieddenheit" (1815)
- Bia 634: German dance for piano trio in F minor (1815)
- Bia 638: Exercise for piano (1815)
- Bia 797: Adagio for String Quartet in E major (1824)
- Bia 811: Canon in C minor (1825)
- Bia 849: Draft for piano (last notes written by Beethoven) (1827)

There were also several projected works by Beethoven, including the operas Alessandro, Memnons Dreiklang, and Bradamante; an oratorio on a text by Meissner, an oratorio "Die Befrieung Jerusalems", and an oratorio "Die Sündflut" with text by Hammer-Purgstall.

== See also ==
- Symphony No. 10 (Beethoven/Cooper) (hypothetical)
