= Op. 81 =

In music, Op. 81 stands for Opus number 81. Compositions that are assigned this number include:

- Beethoven – Piano Sonata No. 26
- Beethoven – Sextet for Horns and String Quartet
- Brahms – Tragic Overture
- Dvořák – Piano Quintet No. 2
- Elgar – The Sanguine Fan
- Milhaud – La création du monde
- Prokofiev – Semyon Kotko
- Sallinen – Symphony No. 8
- Schumann – Genoveva
- Shostakovich – Song of the Forests
- Strauss – Friedenstag
