= Violin Concerto in C major =

Violin Concerto in C major may refer to:

- Violin Concerto No. 1 (Haydn)
- Violin Concerto in C (Beethoven)
- Violin Concerto No. 2 (Saint-Saëns)
