= Quintettsatz in D minor (Beethoven) =

Composition by Beethoven

The Quintettsatz in D minor, Hess 40, is an incomplete composition for a string quintet with two violas by Ludwig van Beethoven. Comprising a completed prelude and an incomplete fugue, it was composed in 1817 around the same time as the Fugue for String Quintet in D major, Op. 137.

From surviving manuscripts, it appears that Beethoven first started work on the quintet around 1815, with sketches of the fugue being found amongst sketches for the Ninth Symphony. It is unclear at this time if Beethoven completed the work.

The composition, which takes around three minutes to perform, is structured as a single movement marked Adagio – Allegro.
