= Rondo for Piano and Orchestra (Beethoven) =

Composition by Ludwig van Beethoven

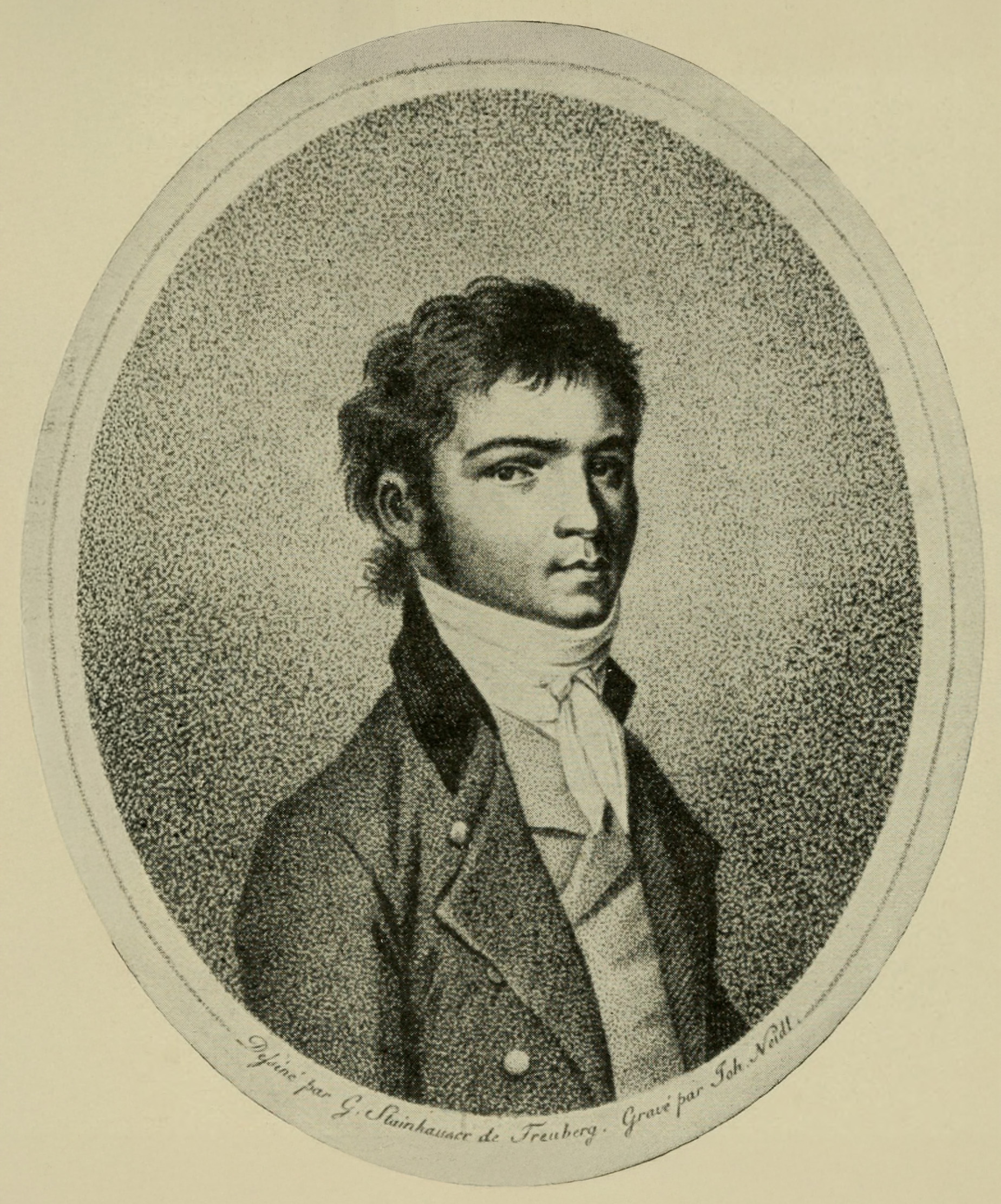
Ludwig van Beethoven, c. 1796

Ludwig van Beethoven's Rondo for Piano and Orchestra in B♭ major, WoO 6 was composed in 1793 and originally intended as the final movement for his second piano concerto. Hans-Werner Küthen states this was probably the finale for the first and second versions of the second piano concerto, being replaced by the final version of the rondo in 1795. He also notes that the most likely inspiration for the insertion of an andante section into the rondo is the concluding rondo of Mozart's Piano Concerto No. 22.

It was eventually published in 1829, with the solo part completed by Carl Czerny. It is scored for an orchestra of flute, two oboes, two bassoons, two horns, and strings, the same instrumentation as the concerto.

== Structure ==
The composition consists of a single multi-tempo movement marked Rondo: Allegro – Andante – Tempo I – Presto.
