= Violin Sonata in A major (Beethoven) =

The Violin Sonata in A major, Hess 46, is a fragmentary and possibly unfinished work for piano and violin composed by Ludwig van Beethoven sometime between 1790 and 1792. Discovered by musicologist Willy Hess, it may be one of Beethoven's first attempts at composing a work for this combination of instruments.

The surviving manuscript comprises three pages containing parts of two separate movements, both of which are missing several pages including their openings. Violinist Eimar Heeney identifies the two fragmentary movements as being the slow movement and concluding rondo. Musicologist Sieghard Brandenburg also reconstructs the fragments in this way and adds that he believes the finale was never completed because the score ends abruptly with plenty of space remaining on the page.

Both authors agree that the work was balanced in such a way that the violin has a purely accompanying role. Brandenburg characterized the fragments as demonstrating that at this point in his career Beethoven possessed a sound understanding of the techniques used in classical violin sonatas, but may not have had the skill to use them effectively. Heeney agrees with the assessment regarding the balance between the violin and the piano in this work and adds that the violin part did not contain anything outside the skills of a typical amateur musician of the period. Scholar Richard Kramer commented that the style of the work was heavily influenced by Mozart's Violin Sonata in A major, K. 526.
