= Sonata in D major for piano four-hands, Op. 6 (Beethoven) =

1797 sonata by Ludwig van Beethoven

The Sonata in D major for piano four-hands, Op. 6, by Ludwig van Beethoven was published by Artaria in October 1797. It has two movements, and is used for teaching piano. A musical pattern used at its beginning and ending is similar to a pattern used later by Beethoven in the Symphony No. 5.
