= Flute Sonata in B-flat major (attributed to Beethoven) =

Composition attributed to Ludwig van Beethoven

The Flute Sonata in B♭ major, Anh. 4 (Note: "Anh." denotes "Anhang" or "appendix" to the catalogue.) is a composition for flute and keyboard attributed to Ludwig van Beethoven found amongst his papers after his death. It remained unpublished until 1906.

== Background ==
Following Beethoven's death, a number of unpublished works were discovered amongst his papers including the Piano Trio, WoO. 38, the Piano Sonata, WoO. 51, the Rondino, WoO. 25 and this sonata for flute and keyboard. Alexander Thayer noted that when the sonata was discovered, the manuscript was not in Beethoven's handwriting, making attribution to the composer problematic. Musicologist Willy Hess argued that Beethoven would not have retained the work in his papers unless he had some personal connection with the composition.

The manuscript was initially obtained by Artaria & Co., who elected not to publish the composition. The sonata was finally published in 1906 by Breitkopf & Härtel. The current location of the manuscript is unknown.

== Structure ==
The sonata is in four movements:

1. Allegro
2. Polacca (polonaise)
3. Largo
4. Thema mit variationen: Allegretto

A typical performances last about 22 minutes.

Carla Rees, in a review of a recording of the sonata released by Naïve Records in 2008 noted that the sonata is a true duo with both instruments sharing in the melodic material. She also speculated based on the writing for the flute that the work may have been a transcription of a violin sonata.
