= Ten National Airs with Variations for Flute and Piano =

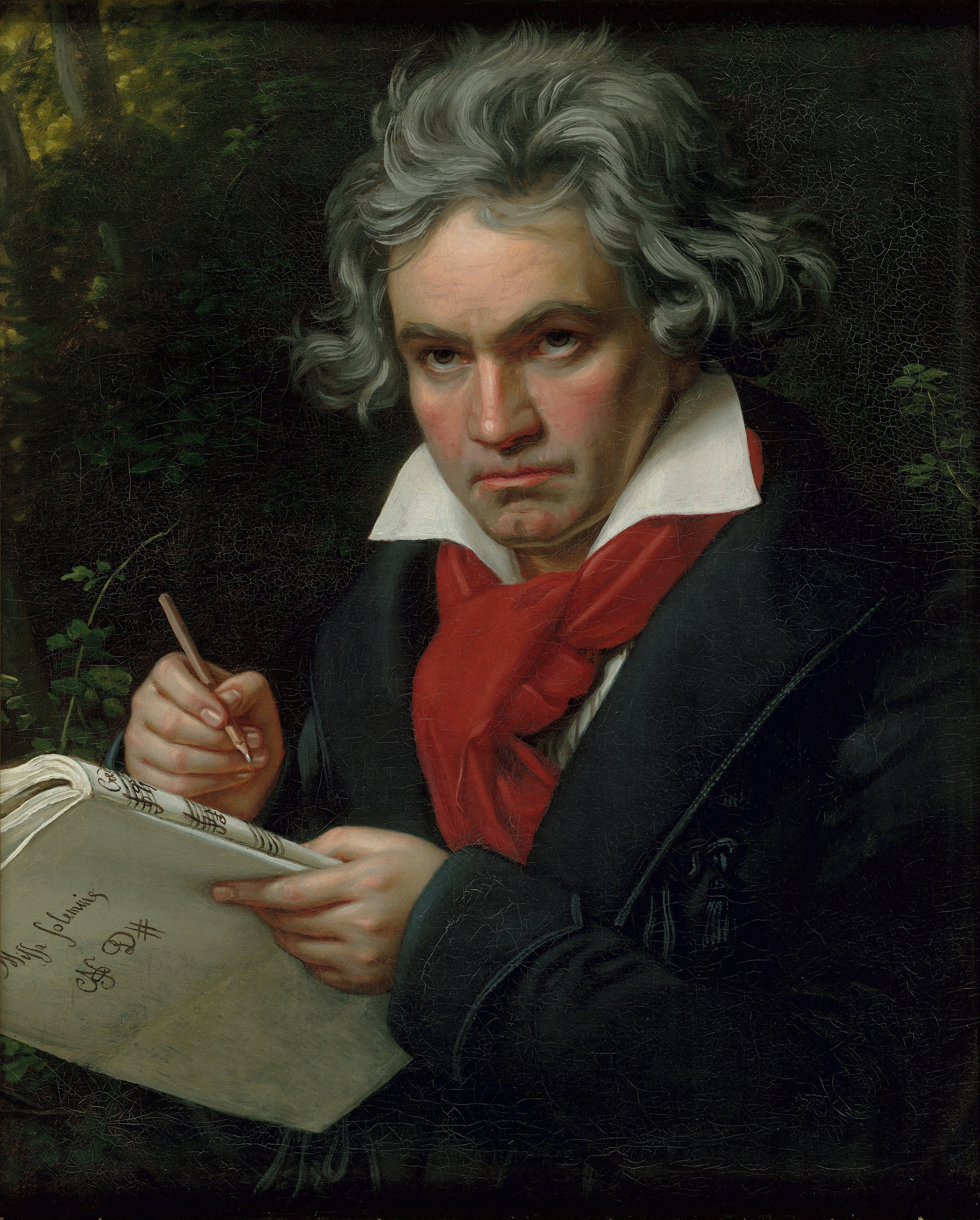
Beethoven with the Manuscript of the Missa Solemnis (1820)

The Ten National Airs with Variations for Flute and Piano, Op. 107, were composed by Ludwig van Beethoven in 1818 and 1819. Beethoven wrote this piece based on folk-derived melodies. This is one of several sets of pieces that Beethoven wrote that are folk-derived. The piece was for George Thomson, a wealthy Edinburgh-based publisher with whom he had a difficult business relationship. These variation sets were first published in 1819 in both London and Vienna.

Schöne Minka
Schöne Minka, based upon a popular Ukrainian folk song

- The first of the ten sets of variations uses an Alpine air (E flat), "Ich bin a Tiroler Bua".
- The second set uses the Scottish "Bonny Laddie, Highland Laddie"
- The third set uses "Volkslied aus Kleinrussland", a Ukrainian dance, as the main theme.
- The fourth set employs the popular "St. Patrick's Day."
- The fifth set ("A Madel, ja a madel") includes great difficulty for both instruments.
- The Sixth set resembles (in mood) Beethoven's Sixth Symphony ("Pastoral").
- In the seventh set, Beethoven uses a popular Ukrainian tune Ikhav Kozak za Dunaj known in Germany as "Schöne Minka."
- The eighth set uses the five variations on "O Mary, at thy Window be". They are solidly conceived and quite inventive.
- The ninth and tenth sets are based on a Scottish tune ("O, Thou art the Lad of my Heart") and a march, "The Highland Watch."
