= Gertrude's Dream Waltz =

Waltz questionably attributed to Beethoven

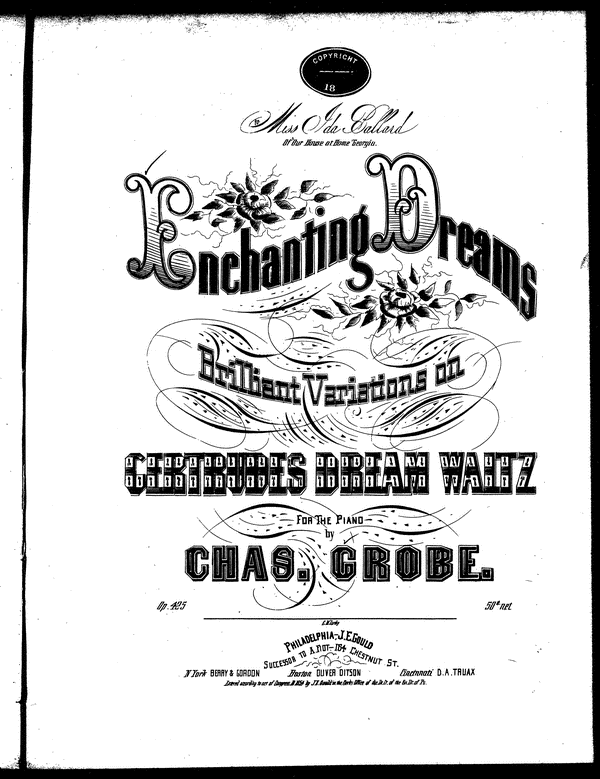
Title page of 1854 US edition

"Gertrude's Dream Waltz" (German: '"Gertruds Traumwalzer"') is a waltz in B-flat major for solo piano which was attributed by its first publisher to Ludwig van Beethoven. It is catalogued as Anhang 16, nr. 2 in the Kinsky-Halm Catalogue of Beethoven fragments, attributions and works without opus number. There is no evidence that Beethoven wrote the piece; he composed few waltzes, and it is not in the style of any of Beethoven's other compositions.

The piece was first published in 1852 (25 years after Beethoven's death) by Fritz Schuberth in Leipzig, Germany. It was first published in the United States in 1854 by J. E. Gould of Philadelphia, with variations by Charles Grobe, under the title "Enchanting Dreams" (and without any attribution to Beethoven).

The piece has been arranged as chamber music.
