= Trio for two Oboes and English Horn (Beethoven) =

Trio composition by Ludwig van Beethoven

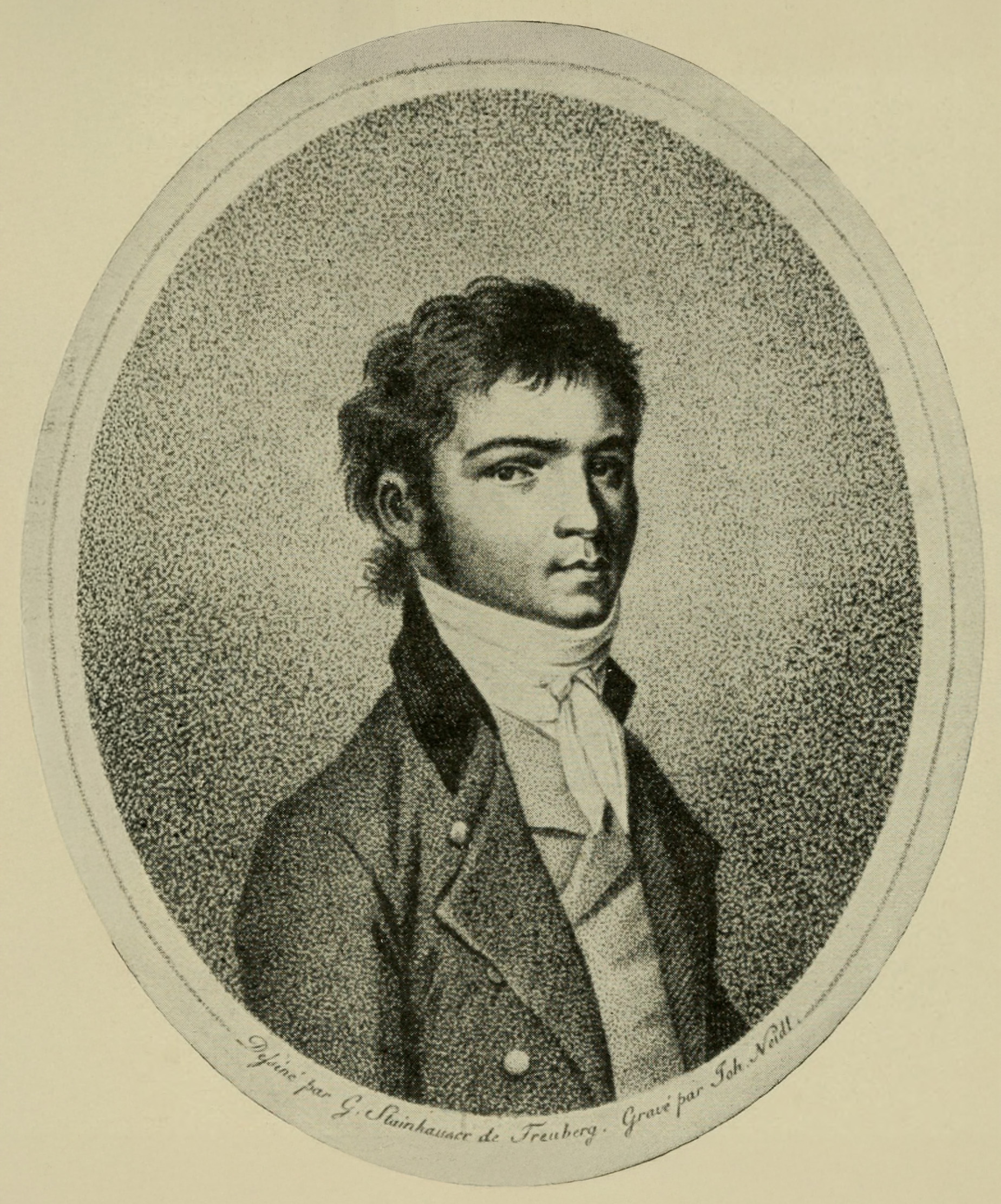
Ludwig van Beethoven

Trio for two Oboes and English Horn in C major, Op. 87 is a trio composition by Ludwig van Beethoven written in 1794, shortly after he arrived in Vienna.

== Structure ==
This trio consists of four movements:

1. Allegro (C major)
2. Adagio (F major)
3. Minuet. Allegro molto. Scherzo – Trio (C major)
4. Finale. Presto (C major)

The final two movements should segue, from the Scherzo coda into the Finale Presto. This is clearly indicated in the holograph housed in the (formerly East) Berlin Deutsche Stadbibliothek. Apparently, performers of his time often chose to play the dance movement without the other movements (a common practice of the time) and those performers modified Beethoven. In order to have a credible finish to the Scherzo, two notes were added to secure the cadence. Without those two notes, the triple rhythm of the dance shifts seamlessly into the duple rhythm of the Finale. This highly popular work has been transcribed for almost every conceivable trio of instruments, all based on the incorrect version popularized at the time, presumably because the original score was never referenced.
