= Rondos, Op. 51 (Beethoven) =

Piano compositions by Ludwig van Beethoven

Ludwig van Beethoven wrote two rondos for solo piano in 1797:

1. Rondo in C major, Op. 51, No. 1
2. Rondo in G major, Op. 51, No. 2

The second rondo bears a dedication to Countess Henriette von Lichnowsky in later editions. Artaria originally published both Rondos without dedications in October 1797. During this time, the composer also wrote the Rondo "Rage Over a Lost Penny" (which was published only posthumously as Op. 129), and the three Piano Sonatas, Op. 10.
