= Trio for piano, flute and bassoon (Beethoven) =

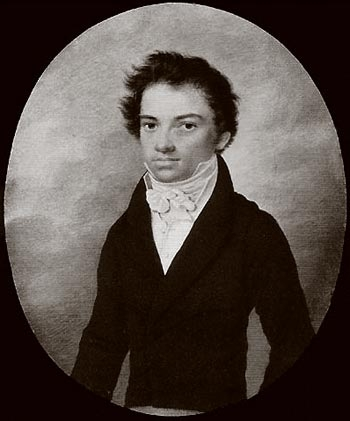
Ludwig van Beethoven in 1788.

The Trio for piano, flute and bassoon in G major, WoO 37, is a composition for piano trio by Ludwig van Beethoven that was discovered amongst Beethoven's papers following his death. Believed to have been composed in his teens and demonstrating the influence of Mozart, the composition remained unpublished until 1888, when it was published in the supplement to the complete set of the composers works by Breitkopf & Härtel.

== Background ==
According to scholar Barry Cooper, Beethoven composed the work around 1786, when he was 15 years old. The intended recipient is supposed to be the Count Friedrich Von Westerholt, an amateur bassoonist, whose daughter Anna Maria was taking piano lessons from Beethoven.

== Music ==
The composition is scored for piano, flute, and bassoon. It is in three movements:

1. Allegro
2. Adagio
3. Thema Andante con Variazioni

A typical performance takes around 26 minutes.
