= Der glorreiche Augenblick =

Cantata composed by Ludwig van Beethoven

Der glorreiche Augenblick, Op. 136 (The glorious moment) is a cantata by Ludwig van Beethoven.

== Composition ==
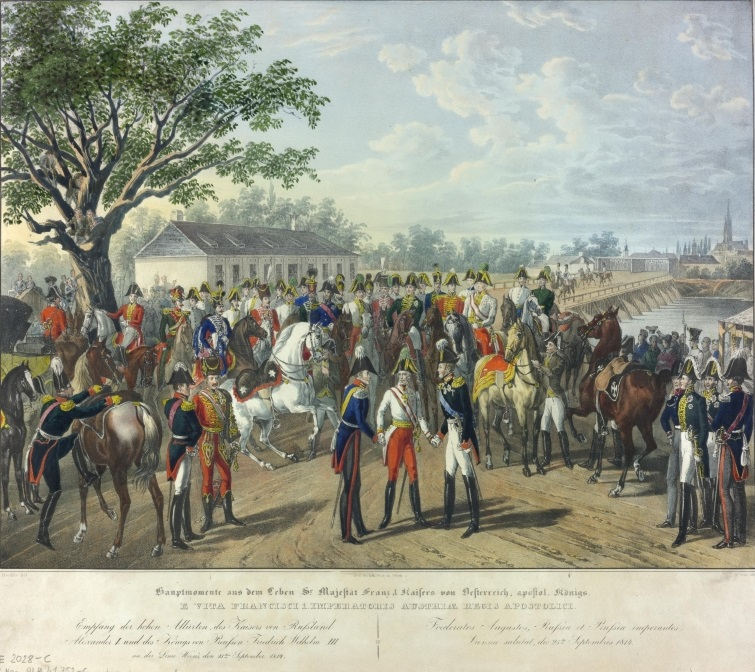
The Congress of Vienna

Der glorreiche Augenblick was written for the opening of the Congress of Vienna after the end of the Napoleonic Wars.

The cantata is scored for two sopranos, tenor and bass soloists, chorus and orchestra. It sets texts by Alois Weissenbach. The Cantata was written in 1814, but not published until 1837, hence the high opus number. The cantata was first performed on November 29th 1814, where it was claimed that all of the Congress of Vienna had attended the premiere including Austrian chancellor Klemens von Metternich, Emperor Alexander I of Russia and King Frederick William III of Prussia.

== Structure ==
The work consists of six movements:

1. Chorus "Europa steht!"
2. Recitative "O seht sie nah' und näher treten!"
3. Aria with chorus "O Himmel, welch' Entzücken!"
4. Recitative "Das Auge schaut"
5. Recitative and quartet "Der den Bund im Sturme fest gehalten"
6. Chorus: "Es treten hervor"

== Instrumentation ==
SATB choir
children's choir (last movement only)
4 soloists (soprano, mezzo-soprano, tenor and bass)
piccolo (last movement only)
2 flutes
2 oboes
2 clarinets in A, B♭ and C
2 bassoons
4 horns in various keys
2 trumpets in various keys
3 trombones (alto, tenor and bass)
triangle, bass drum and cymbals (last movement only)
timpani
1st violins (the third movement contains an extensive part for solo violin)
2nd violins
violas
cellos
double basses
The soloists are personas: the soprano is the city of Vienna, the mezzo-soprano is the Prophetess, the tenor is the Genius and the bass is the Leader of the People.
