= Fugue for String Quintet, Op. 137 (Beethoven) =

1817 musical composition

The Fugue for String Quintet in D major, Op. 137, was composed by Ludwig van Beethoven in 1817. It was the only work he completed for string quintet in his late period. Breitkopf & Härtel published the work after Beethoven's death in 1827, hence the high opus number. The composition is scored for a string quintet with two violas.

== Structure ==
The work is structured as a single movement marked Allegretto and takes around two minutes to perform.
