= Violin Concerto in C (Beethoven) =

Unfinished concerto by Beethoven

The Violin Concerto in C major, WoO 5 is a concerto by Ludwig van Beethoven dating from between 1790 and 1792.

== Description ==
Only a 259-bar fragment of the first movement in Beethoven's handwriting survives, and is kept in the Gesellschaft der Musikfreunde in Vienna. There is extensive debate about whether this fragment represents a part of a finished movement (or indeed an entire concerto), the rest of which has subsequently been lost, or whether the movement was never completed.

The work is scored for solo violin, flute, two oboes, two bassoons, two horns and strings.

== Completions ==
On a number of occasions since its rediscovery in 1870, the work has undergone several attempts at reconstructions by others, including Josef Hellmesberger, Juan Manen, August Wilhelmj, Wilfried Fischer, and Cees Nieuwenhuizen - often with considerable criticism with the way the work has been handled.

The first scholarly edition of the work was published by Willy Hess in 1961.
