= Sextet for Horns and String Quartet (Beethoven) =

The Sextet for Horns and String Quartet, Op. 81b, was written by composer Ludwig van Beethoven, probably around 1795, and published by Simrock Verlag in 1810. It is in the key of E♭ major and is scored for two horns and a string quartet. It was probably modelled on the Horn Quintet in the same key by Mozart (K. 407) and like the earlier work it is written in a concertante style, with virtuosic writing for the two horns.

== Background ==
Prior to the publication by Simrock in 1810, nothing is known about the circumstances of the piece's composition beyond the existence of a few sketches that confirm the work was composed in the mid 1790s. The concertante nature of the piece has led writers like John Henken to speculate that the piece may have been written for specific Bonn-based performers, and to express surprise that more is not known about the work's early history.

== Structure ==
The piece consists of three movements:

1. Allegro con brio (E♭ major)
2. Adagio (A♭ major)
3. Rondo: Allegro (E♭ major)

The typical performance time is around 15–17 minutes.
