= List of Swiss composers =

The following is a partial list of Swiss composers.

== A ==
- Johannes Aal (c. 1500–1551)
- Walther Aeschbacher (1901–1969)
- Volkmar Andreae (1879–1962)

== B ==
- Heidi Baader-Nobs (born 1940)
- Jean Balissat (1936–2007)
- Alfred Baum (1904–1993)
- Conrad Beck (1901–1989)
- George Becker (1834–1928
- Mario Beretta (born 1942)
- Artur Beul (1915–2010)
- Emile-Robert Blanchet (1877–1943)
- Ernest Bloch (1880–1959)
- Adele Bloesch-Stöcker (1875–1978)
- Caroline Boissier-Butini (1786–1836)
- Guy Bovet (born 1942)
- Charles Samuel Bovy-Lysberg (1821–1873)
- Thüring Bräm (born 1944)
- Fritz Brun (1878–1958)
- Adolf Brunner (1901–1992)
- Paul Burkhard (1911–1977)
- Willy Burkhard (1900–1955)

== C ==
- Geneviève Calame (1946–1993)
- Caroline Charrière (1960–2018)

== D ==
- Jean Daetwyler (1907–1994)
- Roland Dahinden (born 1962)
- Jean-Luc Darbellay (born 1946)
- Alexandre Dénéréaz (1875–1947)
- Olga Diener (1890–1963)
- Caspar Diethelm (1926–1996)
- Gustave Doret (1866–1943)
- Édouard Du Puy (1770–1822)

== E ==
- Will Eisenmann (1906–1992)

== F ==
- Richard Flury (1896–1967)
- Emil Frey (1889–1946)
- Carl Friedemann (1862–1952)
- Gaspard Fritz (1716–1783)
- Friedrich Theodor Fröhlich (1803–1836)
- Huldreich Georg Früh (1903–1945)
- Beat Furrer (born 1954)

== G ==
- Henri Gagnebin (1886–1977)
- Rudolph Ganz (1877–1972)
- Éric Gaudibert (1936–2012)
- Robert Gerhard (1896–1970)
- Johann Melchior Gletle (1626–1683)

== H ==
- Hermann Haller (1914–2002)
- Hans Haug (1900–1967)
- David Philip Hefti (born 1975)
- Friedrich Hegar (1841–1927)
- Robert Hermann (1869–1912)
- Ernst Hess (1912–1968)
- Willy Hess (1906–1997)
- Heinz Holliger (born 1939)
- Arthur Honegger (1892–1955)
- Hans Huber (1852–1921)
- Klaus Huber (1924–2017)

== I ==
- Regina Irman (born 1957)

== J ==
- Émile Jaques-Dalcroze (1865–1950)
- Michael Jarrell (born 1958)
- Hans Jelmoli (1877–1936)
- Patricia Jünger (born 1951)
- Paul Juon (1872–1940)

== K ==
- Werner Kaegi (1926–2024)
- Nico Kaufmann (1916–1996)
- Max E. Keller (born 1947)
- Rudolf Kelterborn (1931–2021)
- Lothar Kempter (1844–1918)
- Rafael Kubelík (1914–1996)

== L ==
- Hans Ulrich Lehmann (1937–2013)
- Toni Leutwiler (1923–2009)
- Ernst Levy (1895–1981)
- Don Li (born 1971)
- Rolf Liebermann (1910–1999)

== M ==
- Pierre Mariétan (born 1935)
- Frank Martin (1890–1974)
- Peter Mieg (1906–1990)
- Norbert Moret (1921–1998)
- Fabian Müller (born 1964)

== N ==
- Hans Georg Nägeli (1773–1836)
- Louis Niedermeyer (1802–1861)

== R ==
- Joachim Raff (1822–1882)
- Katharina Rosenberger (born 1971)
- Adolf Reichel (born 1816)
- Sandrine Rudaz
- Carl Rütti (born 1949)

== S ==
- Andrea Lorenzo Scartazzini (born 1971)
- Armin Schibler (1920–1986)
- Martin Schlumpf (born 1947)
- Erich Schmid (1907–2000)
- Daniel Schnyder (born 1961)
- Othmar Schoeck (1886–1957)
- Marianne Schroeder (born 1949)
- Walter Schulthess (1894–1971)
- Meinrad Schütter (1910–2006)
- Heinrich Schweizer (born 1943)
- Ludwig Senfl (um 1486–1543)
- Fridolin Sicher (1490–1546)
- Marcel Sulzberger (1876–1941)
- Hermann Suter (1870–1926)
- Heinrich Sutermeister (1910–1995)
- Iris Szeghy (born 1956)

== T ==
- János Tamás (1936–1995)

== V ==
- Sándor Veress (1907–1992)
- Wladimir Rudolfowitsch Vogel (1896–1984)

== W ==
- Louise Witzig (1901–1969)
- René Wohlhauser (born 1954)
- Luzia von Wyl (born 1985)

== Y ==
- Jing YANG (born 1963)

== Z ==
- Jakob Zeugheer (1803–1865)
- Alberik Zwyssig (1808–1854)
- Adrian von Ziegler (born 1989)
- Walti Zweifel Pattochi von Caslano Ticino (born 1955 Switzerland)
- Fritz Zwicky (1893–1985)
