= Catalogues of classical compositions =

Indexing methodologies for classical music

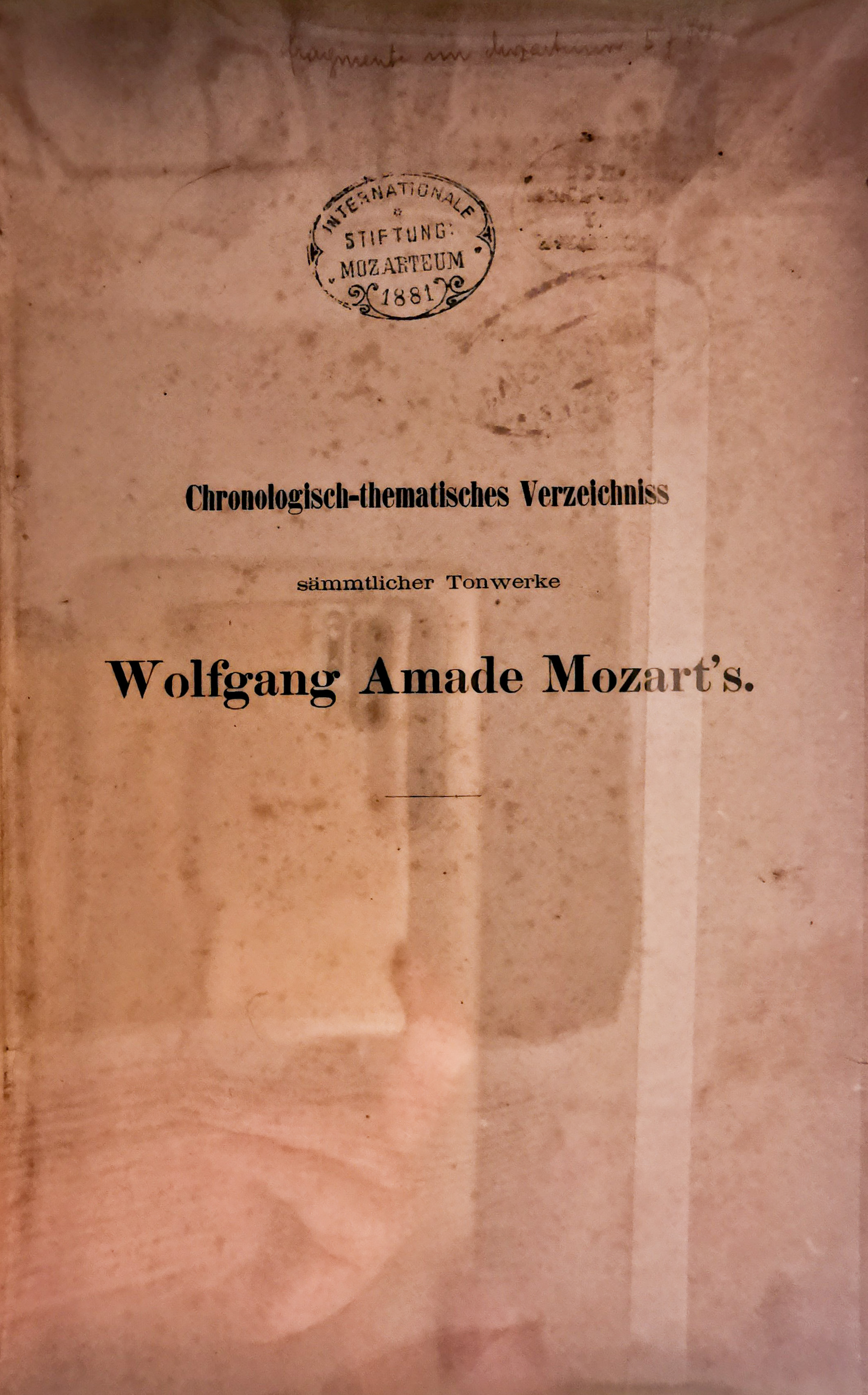
Title page of the first edition (1862) of the Köchel catalog, covering Mozart's compositions. The German may be read as "Chronological-thematic catalog of the complete musical works of Wolfgang Amade Mozart".

This article gives an overview of various catalogues of classical compositions that have come into general use.

== Opus numbers ==
It is certainly possible to identify many musical compositions clearly without the use of a catalog or catalog number. Notably, for centuries the system of opus numbering, where consecutive numbers are assigned to works by the composer or by publishers, has provided a means -- only sometimes effective -- of providing clear identification. The most salient problem with opus numbering is gaps in coverage. Particularly in the days before music publishing had become widespread, it was common for works to be created without being assigned an opus number; and throughout the history of classical music, very few composers gave opus numbers to all of their published works. Here are some of the specific problems.

- Some composers used opus numbers for certain genres of music but not for others (for example, in Handel's time, it was normal to apply opus numbers to instrumental compositions but not to vocal compositions such as operas, oratorios, etc.).
- Some composers gave opus numbers to some of their early compositions but abandoned the practice after some time (examples include Liszt and Hindemith). For Beethoven, it is the opposite: he gave no opus numbers to his earliest work, and only in 1795, at age 24, did he publish his Opus 1, a set of three piano trios.
- Some composers chose to restart the opus numbering sequence. For example, Bartók three times started numbering his works with opus numbers. He stopped the system in 1921 because of the difficulty of distinguishing between original works and ethnographic arrangements, and between major and minor works.
- Some composers used opus numbers in a very erratic manner or were subject to the wishes of their publishers, who for commercial reasons often presented works with opus numbers that bore little relationship to their place in the chronological sequence of the composer's works. In cases such as Schubert and Dvořák, one opus number could refer to a number of different works; or a single work could appear under different opus numbers.
- There are cases where works that a composer chose not to publish were published after their death and assigned very late opus numbers that often give a misleading idea of their order of composition (cases include Mendelssohn, Chopin and Tchaikovsky).
- Other composers simply never used opus numbers at all (examples include Copland, Vaughan Williams and many other 20th-century composers).

In sum, opus numbers are widely used to identify musical compositions, but for the reasons given, they seldom can serve as a comprehensive or reliable way of designating a composer's works. It is for this reason that musicologists have prepared catalogs for the works of many composers.

== Musical catalogues ==
Musical catalogs normally aim to be comprehensive, including all of the works of the composer and incorporating the most up-to-date information about them. Catalogues sometimes go beyond the canonical works to include unpublished sketches, incomplete drafts, and the composer's writings and other non-musical output. In order to avoid confusion and misattribution, catalogs sometime list certain works as only doubtfully attributable to the composer, or include works known to have been spuriously attributed.

Some such catalogues are organised in a single chronological sequence; others are divided into different genres and listed chronologically within each genre; others are alphabetically arranged. A symbol is chosen to represent the catalogue as a whole, and this is usually the initial of the author's or the composer's surname, or an abbreviation of the title of the catalogue itself. In a small number of cases, different symbols apply to different parts of the catalogue.

Among the most famous examples of catalog numbering are:

- the BWV numbers allocated to Johann Sebastian Bach's works in the Bach-Werke-Verzeichnis (Bach Works List) developed by Wolfgang Schmieder. They are also sometimes referred to by their S numbers (after Schmieder)
- the K numbers allocated to Wolfgang Amadeus Mozart's works in the Köchel catalogue, created by Ludwig Ritter von Köchel. In Germany and other parts of Europe, the symbol used is KV, for Köchel-Verzeichnis (Köchel List)
- the D numbers allocated to Franz Schubert's works in the Deutsch catalogue, developed by Otto Erich Deutsch

In some cases, both the opus number and the newer catalogue designation are appended to a work. For example, Schubert's first set of Impromptus was published as Op. 90 and is now catalogued as D 899, but concert programmes, CDs and reference works commonly refer to Schubert's "Impromptus, Op. 90, D. 899".

Some catalogues have appendices (German: Anhang, abbreviated as Anh.) for doubtful and/or spurious works, arrangements, etc.

The preparation of a musical catalog is often an enormous task that can take up decades of a scholar's lifetime; for instance, Anthony van Hoboken's catalog of the works of Joseph Haydn runs well over 1000 pages and took from 1934 to 1978 to prepare. Catalogs can also be revised by later scholars, notably the nine editions of the standard Mozart catalog, created by a series of editors stretching from the founding editor Köchel to (most recently) Neal Zaslaw.

== Thematic catalogue ==
A thematic catalogue is an index used to identify musical compositions through the citation of the opening notes (incipit) and/or main theme(s) of the work and/or of its movements or main sections. Such catalogues can be used for many purposes, including as guides to a specific composer's works, as an inventory of a library's holding or as an advertisement of a publisher's output. In addition to the musical identification, a thematic catalogue may contain information such as dates of composition and first performance. Works within a thematic catalogue can be grouped chronologically or by genre.

Thematic catalogues produced as scholarly guides to the works of a particular composer provide a shorthand means of identification for their music. The Bach-Werke-Verzeichnis (BWV) numbering system used for the works of Johann Sebastian Bach is one example.

== Multiple catalogues ==
In a number of cases, more than one catalogue exists, or has existed, for the same composer's works. In most such cases, only one will be considered the current standard catalogue for the purposes of musicological indexing. For example, Liszt's works are now known only by S numbers, from the catalogue by Humphrey Searle, which superseded that created by Peter Raabe, which used R numbers. Older catalogues are included for historiographic purposes.

But there are exceptions to this, such as:

- For Domenico Scarlatti, the Longo catalogue (L numbers) was in use from 1906, and although it has become generally superseded by the 1953 Kirkpatrick catalogue (K or Kk numbers), L numbers are still seen in references. In 1967, Pestelli created a third catalogue (P numbers), which has found acceptance in some places. Because all three symbols are often encountered, there is a concordance to help navigate between them.
- Beethoven's works can appear with an opus number, a WoO number, a Hess number or a Bia number (see Catalogues of Beethoven compositions). Until 1955, the opus numbers that appeared in the Beethoven Gesamtausgabe were used exclusively, but this edition omitted a large number of works. In 1955, Georg Kinsky and Hans Helm produced a listing of works that had not been given opus numbers, and gave them WoO numbers (Werke ohne Opuszahl, or "Works without opus number"). This listing is often referred to as the Kinsky Catalogue. In 1957, Willy Hess produced a new catalogue of Beethoven's unpublished works, which included all or most of the Kinsky Catalogue as well as other pieces; Hess numbers were allocated to this sequence of works. In 1968, Giovanni Biamonti produced the Biamonti Catalogue, which sought to combine and update all pre-existing catalogues. Bia numbers relate to this catalogue.
  - Note: The WoO symbol has also been used to classify some other composers' works that were not given opus numbers, such as certain works by Mendelssohn, Schumann and Brahms.
- In Chopin's case, at least four latter-day catalogues vie for prominence: Maurice J. E. Brown (B numbers); Krystyna Kobylańska (KK numbers); Józef Michał Chomiński, whose catalogue is segmented into six parts, each part utilising a different letter (A, C, D, E, P and S); and Chopin National Edition WN numbers. Hence, a work of Chopin can be referred to by its opus number and/or a catalogue number preceded by one of nine letter symbols.
- The cataloguing of Bartók's works is similarly complex. Bartók assigned opus numbers to his works three times. He ended this practice with the Violin Sonata No. 1, Op. 21 in 1921, because of the difficulty of distinguishing between original works and ethnographic arrangements, and between major and minor works. Since his death, three attempts—two full and one partial—have been made at cataloguing. The first, and still most widely used, is András Szőllősy's chronological Sz numbers, from 1 to 121. Denijs Dille subsequently reorganised the juvenilia (Sz. 1–25) thematically, as DD numbers 1 to 77. The most recent catalogue is that of László Somfai; this is a chronological index with works identified by BB numbers 1 to 129, incorporating corrections based on the Béla Bartók Thematic Catalogue.

== Ordinary usage ==
While catalogs exist today for the works of all well-known composers, the practice of scholars and program annotators in identifying works remains mixed -- it is hardly the case that catalog numbers inevitably replace the nomenclatural procedures that prevailed earlier.

First, by custom, many particular works are identified by the formula composer's nth genre, where n is the order in which the composer is thought to have composed the works. Thus, the usage ""Mozart's 40th symphony" is more likely to be found than "Mozart's symphony K. 550", particularly in writing addressed to the general public.

Second, the opus numbers in many cases still hold sway. This is true, for instance, for Beethoven's piano sonatas. In the case of Joseph Haydn's string quartets, the opus numbers continue to be used, to some advantage: Haydn mostly wrote his quartets in sets of six, which were published under a single opus number (e.g., Opus 33, no. 1, no. 2 ... no. 6), Each set of six can be considered to some degree as a single musical work and treated as such by critics. The numbering of the Hoboken catalog is by individual quartet and fails to capture this grouping.

Operas and oratorios appear in musical catalogues, but are almost always referred to by title; thus Mozart's final opera would hardly be called "opera, K. 620," but rather is referred to with its title The Magic Flute (German Die Zauberflöte).

Where catalog numbers are used to great advantage is where composers have written hundreds of works in the same genre. Thus catalog numbers are virtually always employed in identifying the cantatas of Bach or the keyboard sonatas of Domenico Scarlatti.

Mixed notations are common. For instance, the Los Angeles Philharmonic offers program notes on the work by Mozart they describe as "Piano Concerto No. 21, K. 467".

== List of catalogues ==
The following incomplete list gives details of many of the catalogues and symbols that have been used, and in many cases are still in use. It is in author or composer order, but can be sorted in symbol order.

Composer or publisher	Author(s), publication details	Symbol	Notes
Carl Friedrich Abel	Knape, Walter (1972). Bibliographisch-thematisches Verzeichnis der Kompositionen von Karl Friedrich Abel (1723–1787). Cuxhaven: [self-published]. OCLC 174473299.	K	
Anton Cajetan Adlgasser	De Catanzaro, Christine; Rainer, Werner (2000). Anton Cajetan Adlgasser (1729–1777): a thematic catalogue of his works. Thematic Catalogues. Vol. 22. Stuyvesant, New York: Pendragon Press. ISBN 978-0-945193-78-4.		
Tomaso Albinoni	Rossi, Franco (2002–2003). Catalogo tematico delle composizioni di Tomaso Albinoni (1671–1750). P. 1, Le 12 opere strumentali a stampa. P. 2, Le opere strumentali manoscritte; Le opere vocali; I libretti. Padova: Edizioni de "I solisti veneti".		2 volumes
Tomaso Albinoni	Talbot, Michael (1990). Tomaso Albinoni: The Venetian Composer and His World. Oxford: Clarendon Press.	T	
Johann Georg Albrechtsberger	Schröder, Dorothea (1987). Die geistlichen Vokalkompositionen Johann Georg Albrechtsbergers. Hamburger Beiträge zur Musikwissenschaft. Vol. 34. Hamburg: Verlag der Musikalienhandlung K.D. Wagner. ISBN 3-88979-025-9. (vol. 1), (vol. 2).	S	
Johann Georg Albrechtsberger	Weinmann, Alexander (1987). Johann Georg Albrechtsberger : thematischer Katalog seiner weltlichen Kompositionen. Beiträge zur Geschichte des Alt-Wiener Musikverlages, Reihe 1. Vol. Folge 5. Wien: Musikverlag L. Krenn.	Som	"mit Benutzung von Laszlo Somfais Autographenkatalog"
Isaac Albéniz	Baytelman, Pola (1993). Isaac Albéniz: Chronological List and Thematic Catalog of His Piano Works. Warren, Michigan: Harmonie Park Press. ISBN 978-0-89990-067-4.	B	
Hugo Alfvén	Rudén, Jan Olof (1972). Hugo Alféns kompositioner = Hugo Alfven musical works; thematic index. Publikationer utgivna av Kungl. Musikaliska akademien. Vol. 11. Stockholm: Nordiska Musikförlaget.	R	
Daniel Auber	Schneider, Herbert (1994). Chronologisch-thematisches Verzeichnis sämtlicher Werke von Daniel François Esprit Auber (AWV). Hildesheim, New York: Georg Olms Verlag. ISBN 978-3-487-09867-8.	AWV	
Carl Philipp Emanuel Bach	Helm, E. Eugene (1989). Thematic catalogue of the works of Carl Philipp Emanuel Bach. New Haven, CT: Yale University Press. ISBN 0-300-02654-4.	H	
Carl Philipp Emanuel Bach	Wotquenne, Alfred (1905). Thematisches Verzeichnis der Werke von Carl Philipp Emanuel Bach (1714–1788). Leipzig: Breitkopf & Härtel.	Wq	Wotquenne's 1906 catalogue has generally been superseded by Eugene Helm's Thematic Catalogue of the Works of C.P.E. Bach (1989), and H numbers are more usual
Carl Philipp Emanuel Bach	Ensslin, Wolfram; Wolf, Uwe (2014). Carl Philipp Emanuel Bach : thematisch-systematisches Verzeichnis der musikalischen Werke. T. 2, Vokalwerke (BR-CPEB). Bach-Repertorium : Werkverzeichnisse zur Musikerfamilie Bach. Vol. 3. Stuttgart: Carus. ISBN 978-3-89948-209-6.	CPEB	Contains vocal works. Vol. 1, containing instrumental works, not yet published
Johann Christian Bach	Terry, Charles Sanford (1967). John Christian Bach (2nd ed.). London, New York: Oxford University Press; Ernest Warburton, Johann Christian Bach. Thematic catalog (New York: Garland Publishing, 1999)	Terry; W	2nd edition with a new foreword by H. C. Robbins Landon
Johann Christian Bach	Warburton, Ernest (1999). The collected works of Johann Christian Bach. Vol. 48. P. 1, Thematic catalogue. New York: Garland. ISBN 0-8240-6097-0.	JCB	Supersedes Terry's catalogue
Johann Christoph Friedrich Bach	Wohlfarth, Hannsdieter (1971). Johann Christoph Friedrich Bach: Ein Komponist im Vorfeld der Klassik. Neue Heidelberger Studien zur Musikwissenschaft. Vol. 4. Bern: Francke.	HW	
Johann Christoph Friedrich Bach	Leisinger, Ulrich (2013). Johann Christoph Friedrich Bach : thematisch-systematisches Verzeichnis der musikalischen Werke (BR-JCFB). Bach-Repertorium : Werkverzeichnisse zur Musikerfamilie Bach. Vol. 4. Stuttgart: Carus. ISBN 978-3-89948-183-9.	JFCB	"L" also used instead of "JFCB"
Johann Ernst Bach II	Rettinghaus, Klaus (2018). Johann Ernst Bach : thematisch-systematisches Verzeichnis der musikalischen Werke. (BR-JEB). Bach-Repertorium : Werkverzeichnisse zur Musikerfamilie Bach. Vol. 6. Stuttgart: Carus. ISBN 978-3-89948-284-3.	JEB	
Johann Sebastian Bach	Schmieder, Wolfgang (1950). Thematisch-systematisches Verzeichnis der musikalischen Werke von Johann Sebastian Bach : Bach-Werke-Verzeichnis (BWV). Leipzig: Breitkopf & Härtel.	BWV	The designation BWV, an abbreviation of Bach-Werke-Verzeichnis, which Schmieder created, is more usual for Bach's works, but S numbers are found in some older references; subsequent 2nd and 3rd editions are mostly reprints
Wilhelm Friedemann Bach	Falck, Martin (1913). Wilhelm Friedemann Bach: sein leben und seine werke, mit thematischem verzeichnis seiner kompositionen und zwei bildern. Leipzig: C. F. Kahnt nachfolger.	F (or) Fk	Falck catalogue
Wilhelm Friedemann Bach	Wollny, Peter (2012). Wilhelm Friedemann Bach : thematisch-systematisches Verzeichnis der musikalischen Werke (BR-WFB). Bach-Repertorium : Werkverzeichnisse zur Musikerfamilie Bach. Vol. 2. Stuttgart: Carus. ISBN 978-3-89948-155-6.	WFB	Supersedes Falck's catalogue
Bálint Bakfark	Homolya, István (1982). Bakfark. Budapest: Zeneműkiadó. ISBN 963-330-420-2.	VB	Bakfark's given name is sometimes seen as Valentin
Samuel Barber	Heyman, Barbara B. (2012). Samuel Barber: A Thematic Catalogue of the Complete Works. New York: Oxford University Press. ISBN 978-0-1997-4464-0.	H	
Béla Bartók	Somfai, László (1996). Béla Bartók: composition, concepts, and autograph sources. Ernest Bloch lectures. Vol. 9. Berkeley, CA: University of California Press. ISBN 0-520-08485-3.	BB	
Béla Bartók	Dille, Denijs (1974). Thematisches Verzeichnis der Jugendwerke Béla Bartóks: 1890–1904. Kassel: Bärenreiter. ISBN 978-3-7618-0437-7.	DD	
Béla Bartók	Szőllősy, András (1948). Bartók Béla válogatott zenei írásai. Zenetörténet kézikönyvei. Vol. 3. Budapest: Mágyar Kórus.	Sz	Bartók's works have been designated by numbering systems developed by three different catalogers. Szőllősy's chronological index is the most frequently used. It includes Bartók's musicological writings as well as his compositions.
Arnold Bax	Parlett, Graham (1999). A catalogue of the works of Sir Arnold Bax. Oxford: Clarendon Press. ISBN 0-19-816586-2.	GP	
Ludwig van Beethoven	Hess, Willy (1957). Verzeichnis der nicht in der Gesamtausgabe veröffentlichten Werke Ludwig van Beethovens. Zusammengestellt für die Ergänzung der Beethoven-Gesamtausgabe. Wiesbaden: Breitkopf & Härtel.	Hess	
Ludwig van Beethoven	Kinsky, George; Halm, Hans (1955). Das Werk Beethovens; thematisch-bibliographisches Verzeichnis seiner sämtlichen vollendeten Kompositionen. München: G. Henle Verlag.	WoO	
Ludwig van Beethoven	Biamonti, Giovanni (1968). Catalogo cronologico e tematico delle opere di Beethoven, comprese quelle inedite e gli abbozzi non utilizzati. Torino: ILTE.	Bia	The Biamonti Catalogue (1968) sought to incorporate all works listed in other places, including the Beethoven Gesamtausgabe, the Kinsky-Helm catalogue (WoO numbers) and the Hess catalogue
Ludwig van Beethoven	Dorfmüller, Kurt (2014). Ludwig van Beethoven : thematisch-bibliographisches Werkverzeichnis. München: G. Henle. ISBN 978-3-87328-153-0.		2 volumes. Supersedes the Kinsky-Halm catalogue
Ludwig van Beethoven	Столяр, Владимир (Stoliar, Vladimir) (2016) «Людвиг ван Бетховен. Каталог сочинений» (“Ludwig van Beethoven. The Catalogue of his compositions” ) with preface in Russian and English. Москва. Современная музыка (Moscow. “Sovremennaya musyka” ).	Opp. 1–138, WoO 1–399	The Stoliar Catalogue includes 1068 Beethoven's compositions; it is about 150 compositions more than in the Munchen Catalogue
Franz Benda	Lee, Douglas A. (1984). Franz Benda (1709–1786), a thematic catalogue of his works. Thematic catalogues. Vol. 10. New York: Pendragon Press. ISBN 0-918728-42-8.	L	
Hector Berlioz	Holoman, D. Kern (1987). Catalogue of the works of Hector Berlioz. Kassel; New York: Bärenreiter. ISBN 3-7618-0449-0.	H	
Heinrich Biber	Chafe, Eric Thomas (1987). The church music of Heinrich Biber. Studies in musicology. Vol. 95. Ann Arbor, Michigan: University of Michigan Research Press. ISBN 0-8357-1770-4.	C or Ch	Lists all kinds of musical works by Biber, notwithstanding the book's title. Non-thematic catalogue.
William Billings	Kroeger, Karl (1991). Catalog of the musical works of William Billings. Music reference collection. Vol. 32. New York: Greenwood Press. ISBN 0-313-27827-X.		Non-thematic catalogue
Georges Bizet	Dean, Winton (1975). Bizet. The Master musicians series. London: Dent. ISBN 0-460-03163-5.	WD	
Arthur Bliss	Craggs, Stewart R. (1996). Arthur Bliss: A Source Book. Aldershot, England: Scolar Press. ISBN 978-0-85967-940-4.	B	
Arthur Bliss	Foreman, Lewis (1980). Arthur Bliss, catalogue of the complete works. Sevenoaks: Novello. ISBN 978-0-85360-069-5.	F	
Luigi Boccherini	Gérard, Yves (1969). Thematic, bibliographical, and critical catalogue of the works of Luigi Boccherini. London: Oxford University Press. ISBN 0-19-711616-7.	G	
Joseph Bodin de Boismortier	Perreau, Stéphan (2001). Joseph Bodin de Boismortier : 1689–1755 : un musicien lorrain-catalan à la cour des Lumières. Musique et patrimoine en Languedoc-Roussillon. Montpellier: Presses du Languedoc. ISBN 2-85998-237-X.	PB	Non-thematic catalogue
Johannes Brahms	McCorkle, Margit L. (1984). Johannes Brahms : thematisch-bibliographisches Werkverzeichnis. München: G. Henle. ISBN 3-87328-041-8.	WoO	
Frank Bridge	Hindmarsh, Paul (1983). Frank Bridge : a thematic catalogue, 1900–1941. London: Faber Music in association with Faber and Faber. ISBN 0-571-10032-5.	H	
Benjamin Britten	"Britten Thematic Catalogue, Beta Version".		
Sebastien de Brossard	Duron, Jean (1995). L'œuvre de Sébastien de Brossard : (1655–1730) : catalogue thématique. Domaine musicologique. II, Publications du Centre de musique baroque de Versailles. Vol. a 1 1. Versailles; Paris: Éditions du Centre de musique baroque à Versailles; Klincksieck. ISBN 2-252-03039-9.	SdB	
Anton Bruckner	Auer, Max (1947). Anton Bruckner; sein Leben und Werk. Zürich: Amalthea-Verlag.		
Anton Bruckner	Grasberger, Renate (1977). Werkverzeichnis Anton Bruckner : (WAB). Institut für Österreichische Musikdokumentation. Publikation. Vol. 7. Tutzing: Hans Schneider. ISBN 3-7952-0232-9.	WAB	The Werkverzeichnis Anton Bruckner did not include any unfinished compositions (an exception was made for the Ninth Symphony) or lost works. Lost works, sketches, etc. were added afterwards (WAB 132 to WAB 149). Some other, still unclassified works were identified as WAB deest. The WAB deest works were later reclassified in the framework of the research project Digitales Werkverzeichnis Anton Bruckner (dWAB, 2017–2019) of the Österreichische Akademie der Wissenschaften.
Gaetano Brunetti	Labrador López de Azcona, Germán (2005). Gaetano Brunetti (1744–1798) : catálogo crítico, temático y cronológico. Colección de monografias. Vol. 8. Madrid: Aedom. ISBN 84-922195-8-0.	BruWV	
Ferruccio Busoni	Kindermann, Jürgen (1980). Thematisch-chronologisches Verzeichnis der musikalischen Werke von Ferruccio B. Busoni. Studien zur Musikgeschichte des 19. Jahrhunderts. Vol. 19. Regensburg: G. Bosse. ISBN 3-7649-2033-5.	BV	BV (short for Busoni-Verzeichnis) is used for original works; BV B (short for Busoni-Verzeichnis Bearbeitung) is used for transcriptions, cadenzas, etc. Busoni's works are also seen with KiV numbers.
Dieterich Buxtehude	Karstädt, Georg (1985). Thematisch-systematisches Verzeichnis der musikalischen Werke von Dietrich Buxtehude: Buxtehude-Werke-Verzeichnis (BuxWV). Wiesbaden: Breitkopf & Härtel. ISBN 3-7651-0065-X.	BuxWV	
Antonio de Cabezón	Jacobs, Charles (1967–1986). Gesamtausgabe der Werke von Antonio de Cabezón = The collected works of Antonio de Cabezón: Institute of Mediæval Music. Brooklyn, N.Y.	J	
Ferdinando Carulli	Torta, Mario (1993–1994). Catalogo tematico delle opere di Ferdinando Carulli. Musicalia (Lucca). Vol. 3. Lucca: Libreria musicale italiana. ISBN 88-7096-036-6.		2 volumes.
Marc-Antoine Charpentier	Hitchcock, H. Wiley (1982). Les œuvres de Marc-Antoine Charpentier: catalogue raisonné = The works of Marc-Antoine Charpentier. Paris: Picard. ISBN 2-7084-0084-3.	H	
Frédéric Chopin	Chomiński, Józef M.; Turło, Teresa Dalila (1990). Katalog dzieł Fryderyka Chopina = A catalogue of the works of Frederick Chopin. Documenta Chopiniana. Kraków: Polskie Wydawn. Muzyczne. ISBN 83-224-0407-7.	A	Chomiński's catalogue of Chopin's works (Katalog dzieł Fryderyka Chopina, 1990) is in alphabetical order, and uses the letters A, C, D, E, P and S.
Frédéric Chopin	Brown, Maurice J. E. (1960). Chopin: an Index of His Works in Chronological Order. London, New York: St. Martin's Press. OCLC 682225716.	B	
Frédéric Chopin	Kobylańska, Krystyna (1979). Frédéric Chopin: thematisch-bibliographisches Werkverzeichnis = Rekopisy utworów Chopina katalog. München: G. Henle. ISBN 3-87328-029-9.	KK	
Frédéric Chopin	Ekier, Jan (1974–2010). Polish National Edition of the Works of Fryderyk Chopin. Warsaw: Fryderyk Chopin Institute.	WN	Chopin National Edition
Jeremiah Clarke	Taylor, Thomas F. (1977). Thematic catalog of the works of Jeremiah Clarke. Detroit studies in music bibliography. Vol. 35. Detroit: Information Coordinators. ISBN 0-911772-84-7.	T	
Muzio Clementi	Tyson, Alan (1967). Thematic Catalogue of the Works of Muzio Clementi. Tutzing: Hans Schneider.	T	
Louis-Nicolas Clérambault	Cessac, Catherine (1998). Nicolas Clérambault. Paris: Fayard. ISBN 2-213-60175-5.	C	
Arcangelo Corelli	Marx, Hans Joachim (1980). Die Überlieferung der Werke Arcangelo Corellis : catalogue raisonné. Historisch-kritische Gesamtausgabe der musikalischen Werke. Suppl.-Bd. Vol. 6. Köln: Volk. ISBN 3-87252-121-7.		
Peter Cornelius	Wagner, Günther (1986). Peter Cornelius, Verzeichnis seiner musikalischen und literarischen Werke. Mainzer Studien zur Musikwissenschaft. Vol. 13. Tutzing: Hans Schneider. ISBN 3-7952-0455-0.	W	
François Couperin	Cauchie, Maurice (1949). Thematic Index of the Works of François Couperin. Monaco: Lyrebird Press. OCLC 860553.	B	
Johann Baptist Cramer	Milligan, Thomas B. (1994). Johann Baptist Cramer (1771–1858): a thematic catalogue of his works. Thematic Catalogues. Vol. 19. Stuyvesant, New York: Pendragon Press. ISBN 978-0-945193-41-8.		"based on the foundation laid by Jerald C. Graue"
Franz Danzi	Pechstaedt, Volkmar von (1996). Thematisches Verzeichnis der Kompositionen von Franz Danzi (1763–1826) : mit einem Anhang der literarischen Arbeiten Danzis. Tutzing: Hans Schneider. ISBN 3-7952-0840-8.	P	
Claude Debussy	Lesure, François (1977). Catalogue de l'œuvre de Claude Debussy. Centre de documentation Claude Debussy Publications. Vol. 3. Genève: Minkoff. ISBN 2-8266-0657-3.	L	
Michel Richard Delalande	Dufourcq, Norbert (1957). Notes et références pour servir à une histoire de Michel-Richard Delalande, surintendant, maître et compositeur de la musique de la chambre du roi, sous-maître et compositeur de la chapelle royale (1657–1726). La Vie musicale en France sous les rois Bourbons. Paris: A. & J. Picard.	S	
Michel Richard Delalande	Sawkins, Lionel; Nightingale, John (2005). A thematic catalogue of the works of Michel-Richard de Lalande (1657–1726). Oxford: Oxford University Press. ISBN 978-0-19-816360-2.	S	
Frederick Delius	Joanna Bullivant, Daniel Grimley. Catalogue of the Works of Frederick Delius	DCW	
Carl Ditters von Dittersdorf	Grave, Margaret (1985). Carl Ditters von Dittersdorf: Six Symphonies. The Symphony 1720–1840 B. Vol. 1. New York: Garland. ISBN 0-8240-3859-2.	G	
Carl Ditters von Dittersdorf	Krebs, Carl (1900). Dittersdorfiana. Berlin: Gebrüder Paetel. pp. 55–144.	K	Also seen as Kr. Non-thematic catalogue.
Carl Ditters von Dittersdorf	Lane, Jay D. (1997). The concertos of Carl Ditters von Dittersdorf (Ph. D. thesis). New Haven: Yale University.	L	
Carl Ditters von Dittersdorf	Yeon, Sang-Chun (1999). Carl Ditters von Dittersdorf : die Kammermusik für Streichinstrumente; quellenkundliche und stilistische Untersuchungen mit einem thematischen Verzeichnis. Studien und Materialien zur Musikwissenschaft. Vol. 19. Hildesheim: Georg Olms. ISBN 3-487-11030-X.	Y	
Ernő Dohnányi	Kiszely-Papp, Deborah (2008). Erno dohnanyi: a thematic catalogue. Thematic Cataloges. Vol. 29. Stuyvesant, New York: Pendragon Press. ISBN 978-1-57647-131-9.		
Gaetano Donizetti	Inzaghi, Luigi (1988). Catalogo generale Donizetti. London: The Donizetti Society.	In	
John Dowland	Grapes, K. Dawn (2020). John Dowland: A Research and Information Guide. New York: Routledge. ISBN 9780367784935.	D	First section of lute works follows Poultons P numbers (as D equivalent), but catalog also includes songs, psalms, consort music, and other instrumental music.
John Dowland	Poulton, Diana; Lam, Basil (1981). The collected lute music of John Dowland (3rd ed.). London: Faber Music. ISBN 978-0-571-10039-2.	P	
František Xaver Dušek	Altner, Vladimir (November 1984). "Thematic Index: Dušek". The Symphony, 1720–1840. B. Vol. 12. New York: Garland. pp. xxxvii–xli. ISBN 978-0-8240-3848-9.		
František Xaver Dušek	Sýkora, Václav Jan (1958). František Xaver Dušek : život a dílo. Prague: Krásné Literatury.		
Jan Ladislav Dussek	Craw, H. Allen (1964). A biography and thematic catalog of the works of J. L. Dussek, 1760–1812. Los Angeles: University of Southern California.	C	
Antonín Dvořák	Herbert, Peter J. F. (1988). Antonín Dvořák, Complete Catalogue of Works. [Great Britain]: Dvořák Society for Czech Music. OCLC 315534955.	H	
Antonín Dvořák	Burghauser, Jarmil; Clapham, John (1996). Antonín Dvořák: thematický katalog [thematic catalogue]. Prague: Bärenreiter Edition Suprahon. ISBN 978-80-7058-410-1.	B	
Antonín Dvořák	Šourek, Otakar (1917). Dvořákś Werke ... ein vollständiges Verzeichnis in chronologischer thematischer und systematischer Anordnung. Berlin: N. Simrock. OCLC 7629267.	S	
Antonín Dvořák	Trufitt, Ian T. (1974). Antonín Dvořák, Complete Catalogue of Works. Great Britain: Dvořák Society of Great Britain. OCLC 11677657.	T	
Jean-Frédéric Edelmann	Benton, Rita (1964). "The Instrumental Music of Jean-Frédéric Edelmann: a Thematic Catalogue and List of Early Editions". Fontes Artis Musicae. xi: 79–88.		
Joseph Eybler	Herrmann, Hildegard (1976). Thematisches Verzeichnis der Werke von Joseph Eybler. Musikwissenschaftliche Schriften. Vol. 10. München. ISBN 3-87397-109-7.		
Manuel de Falla	Gallego, Antonio (1987). Catálogo de obras de Manuel de Falla. Madrid: Ministerio de Cultura. Dirección General de Bellas Artes y Archivos.	G	
Giles Farnaby	Marloww, Richard (1974). Giles & Richard Farnaby, keyboard music. Musica Britannica. Vol. 24 (2nd revised ed.). London: Stainer and Bell.	M	
Johann Friedrich Fasch	Pfeiffer, Rüdiger (1988). Verzeichnis der Werke von Johann Friedrich Fasch (FWV). Dokumente und Materialien zur Musikgeschichte des Bezirkes Magdeburg. Vol. 1 (kleine Ausgabe ed.). Magdeburg: Rat des Bezirkes.	FWV	Non-thematic catalogue
Gabriel Fauré	Nectoux, Jean-Michel (2018). Gabriel Fauré - Catalogue of works. Bärenreiter. ISBN 9783761822296.		
Alfonso Ferrabosco	Charteris, Richard (1984). Alfonso Ferrabosco the Elder (1543–1588), a thematic catalogue of his music. Thematic catalogues. Vol. 1. New York: Pendragon Press. ISBN 978-0-918728-44-9.	RC	
Friedrich Ernst Fesca	Frei-Hauenschild, Markus (1998). Friedrich Ernst Fesca (1789–1826): Studien zu Biographie und Streichquartettschaffen. Göttingen: Vandenhoeck & Ruprecht. ISBN 3-525-27902-7.	FreF	
Joseph Fiala	Reinländer, Claus (1993). Joseph Fiala : thematisch-systematisches Werkverzeichnis. Puchheim: Engel.		
Zdeněk Fibich	Hudec, Vladimír (2001). Zdeněk Fibich: tematický katalog = thematisches Verzeichnis = thematic catalogue. Praha: Editio Bärenreiter. ISBN 978-80-86385-10-5.	H	
John Field	Hopkinson, Cecil (1961). A bibliographical thematic catalogue of the works of John Field, 1782–1837. London: The author.	H	
César Franck	Mohr, Wilhelm (1969). Caesar Franck. Tutzing: Hans Schneider.	FWV	The Franck-Werke-Verzeichnis was compiled by Wilhelm Mohr, and Franck's works are sometimes referred to by their M numbers
Ignaz Fränzl	Würtz, Roland (1970). Ignaz Fränzl : ein Beitrag zur Musikgeschichte der Stadt Mannheim. Beiträge zur mittelrheinischen Musikgeschichte. Vol. 12. Mainz: Schott.		
Frederick the Great	Philipp Spitta	S	
Johann Balthasar Christian Freißlich	Neschke, Karla (2000). Johann Balthasar Christian Freislich : (1687–1764) : Leben, Schaffen und Werküberlieferung : mit einem thematisch-systematischen Verzeichnis seiner Werke. Schriftenreihe zur mitteldeutschen Musikgeschichte. Vol. Ser. 2, 3. Oschersleben: Ziethen. ISBN 3-932090-81-0.	FreisWV	
Johann Joseph Fux	Köchel, Ludwig von (1872). Johann Josef Fux. Vienna: Hölder.	K	Supplements to Köchel's catalogue use the letters E, L and N.
Johann Joseph Fux	Hochradner, Thomas (2016). Thematisches Verzeichnis der Werke von Johann Joseph Fux ... Band I. Vienna: Hollitzer. ISBN 978-3-99012-159-7.	FuxWV	Only vol. I published so far
Giovanni Gabrieli	Charteris, Richard (1996). Giovanni Gabrieli (ca. 1555–1612): a thematic catalogue of his music with a guide to the source materials and translations of his vocal texts. Thematic catalogues. Vol. 20. Stuyvesant, New York: Pendragon Press. ISBN 0-945193-66-1.	C	
Baldassare Galuppi	Rossi, Franco (2006). Catalogo tematico delle composizioni di Baldassare Galuppi (1706–1785) : Parte I: Le opere strumentali. Padova: Edizioni de "I solisti veneti". ISBN 88-901412-5-5.		Part 2 and 3, containing vocal works, not yet published
José Maurício Nunes Garcia	De Mattos, Cleofe Person (1970). Catálogo Temático das obras do padre José Maurício Nunes Garcia (PDF). Rio de Janeiro: Conselho Federal de Cultura.	CPM	Updated index at Monteiro Neto, Antonio Campos (2011). "José Maurício Nunes Garcia".
Florian Leopold Gassmann	Hill, George R. (1976). A thematic catalog of the instrumental music of Florian Leopold Gassmann. Music indexes and bibliographies. Vol. 12. Hackensack, New Jersey: Joseph Boonin. ISBN 978-0-913574-12-6.	H	
Francesco Geminiani	Hogwood, Christopher. Francesco Geminiani Thematic Catalogue.	H	available at https://web.archive.org/web/20190322080501/http://www.francescogeminiani.com/catalogue/catalogue.php
Orlando Gibbons	John Harper	H	
Mauro Giuliani	Heck, Thomas F. (1995). Mauro Giuliani : virtuoso guitarist and composer. Editions Orphée. ISBN 1-882612-00-0.		
Christoph Willibald Gluck	Wotquenne, Alfred (1904). Thematisches Verzeichnis der Werke von Chr. W. v. Gluck (1714–1787). Leipzig: Breitkopf & Härtel.	W	
Christoph Willibald Gluck	Liebeskind, Josef (1911). Ergänzungen und Nachträge zu dem Thematischen Verzeichnis der Werke von Chr. W. von Gluck von Alfred Wotquenne. Leipzig: Reinecke.	W	Supplement to Wotquenne's book
François-Joseph Gossec	Brook, Barry S. (1983). Eight symphonic works. The Symphony, 1720–1840, Series D. Vol. 3. New York: Garland. p. xxvii–xl. ISBN 978-0-8240-3839-7.	B	
François-Joseph Gossec	Role, Claude (2000). François-Joseph Gossec : (1734–1829) : un musicien à Paris : de l'ancien régime à Charles X. Univers musical. Paris: L'Harmattan. ISBN 2-7384-9678-4.	RH	Non-thematic catalogue
Louis Moreau Gottschalk	Doyle, John G. (1960). The piano music of Louis Moreau Gottschalk (1829–1869). New York: New York University.	D	
Louis Moreau Gottschalk	Offergeld, Robert (1970). The centennial catalogue of the published and unpublished compositions of Louis Moreau Gottschalk. New York: Ziff-Davis Publishing.	RO	
Charles Gounod	Condé, Gérard (2009). Charles Gounod. Paris: Fayard. ISBN 978-2-213-63249-0.	CG	
Enrique Granados	de Larrocha, Alicia; Riva, Douglas; Aviñoa, Xosé (2003). Enrique Granados: Perfil histórico-biográfico. Barcelona: Editorial de música Boileau. ISBN 978-84-8020-692-1.	DLR	
Carl Heinrich Graun and Johann Gottlieb Graun	Henzel, Christoph (2006). Graun-Werkverzeichnis (GraunWV). Beeskow: Ortus Musikverlag. ISBN 978-3-937788-02-9.	GraunWV	Supersedes the catalogues of Mennicke and Willer
Carl Heinrich Graun	Mennicke, Carl Heinrich (1906). Hasse und die Brüder Graun als Symphoniker : nebst Biographien und thematischen Katalogen. Leipzig: Breitkopf & Härtel.	M	
Carl Heinrich Graun	Willer, Monika (1995). Die Konzertform der Brüder Carl Heinrich und Johann Gottlieb Graun. Europäische Hochschulschriften, Reihe XXXVI, Musikwissenschaft. Vol. 117. Frankfurt am Main: Peter Lang. ISBN 978-3-631-47014-5.	W	
Johann Gottlieb Graun	Willer, Monika (1995). Die Konzertform der Brüder Carl Heinrich und Johann Gottlieb Graun. Europäische Hochschulschriften, Reihe XXXVI, Musikwissenschaft. Vol. 117. Frankfurt am Main: Peter Lang. ISBN 978-3-631-47014-5.	W	
Christoph Graupner	Bill, Oswald; Grosspietsch, Christoph (2005). Christoph Graupner: thematisches Verzeichnis der musikalischen Werke: Graupner-Werke-Verzeichnis (GWV). Instrumentalwerke. Stuttgart: Carus. ISBN 3-89948-066-X.	GWV	
Giovanni Battista Grazioli	Tomasi, Margherita (2005). Giovanni Battista Grazioli (1746–1820) : catalogo tematico. [Edizioni Fondazione Levi], Serie 3, Studi musicologici. C, Catalohgi e bibliografia. Vol. 14. Venezia: Fondazione Levi. ISBN 88-7552-099-2.		
Edvard Grieg	Fog, Dan; Grinde, Kirsti; Norheim, Øyvind (2008). Edvard Grieg (1843–1907): thematisch-bibliographisches Werkverzeichnis. Frankfurt: Henry Litolff's Verlag/C.F. Peters. ISBN 978-3-87626-990-0.	EG	
Charles Tomlinson Griffes	Anderson, Donna K. (1983). The Works of Charles T. Griffes: a Descriptive Catalogue. Studies in Musicology. Vol. 68. Ann Arbor, Michigan: University of Michigan Press. ISBN 978-0-8357-1419-8.	A	
Adalbert Gyrowetz	Rice, John A. (1983). Four symphonies. The Symphony, 1720–1840, Series B. Vol. 11. New York: Garland. ISBN 978-0-8240-3826-7.	R	Also contains a symphonie concertante by Dussek
George Frideric Handel	Bell, A. Craig (1972). Handel; chronological thematic catalogue. Darley: Grian-Aig Press.	B	Non-thematic catalogue
George Frideric Handel	Baselt, Bernd (1978). Händel-Handbuch: in fünf Bd.: gleichzeitig Suppl. zu Hallische Händel-Ausgabe (Kritische Gesamtausgabe). Kassel: Bärenreiter.	HWV	The Händel-Werke-Verzeichnis was published in three volumes between 1978 and 1986
George Frideric Handel	Marx, Hans Joachim (2017). Die G. F. Händel zugeschriebenen Kompositionen, 1700–1800 : (HWV Anh. B) = The compositions attributed to G. F. Handel, 1700–1800. Hildesheim: Georg Olms. ISBN 978-3-487-15483-1.	HWV	Appendix to HWV; contains doubtful and spurious works
George Frideric Handel		HG	The Händel-Gesellschaft has been superseded by the Händel-Werke-Verzeichnis (HWV)
George Frideric Handel		HHA	The Hallische Händel-Ausgabe has been superseded by the Händel-Werke-Verzeichnis (HWV)
Valentin Haussmann	Lynn, Robert B. (1997). Valentin Haussmann (1565/70 – ca. 1614): a thematic-documentary catalogue of his works. Thematic Catalogues. Vol. 25. Stuyvesant, New York: Pendragon Press. ISBN 978-0-945193-91-3.		With a documentary biography by Klaus-Peter Koch
Joseph Haydn	Hoboken, Anthony van (1978) [1957]. Joseph Haydn; thematisch-bibliographisches Werkverzeichnis. Mainz: B. Schott’s Söhne. ISBN 978-3-7957-0003-4.	HV or Hob.	The Hoboken-Verzeichnis was created in 1957. Haydn's string quartets are still generally referred to by their opus numbers.
Michael Haydn	Sherman, Charles H. (1993). Johann Michael Haydn (1737–1806), a chronological thematic catalogue of his work. Thematic catalogues. Vol. 17. Stuyvesant, N.Y.: Pendragon Press. ISBN 0-918728-56-8.	MH	Johann Michael Haydn (1737–1806), a chronological thematic catalogue of his works (1993); this has generally superseded the Perger-Verzeichnis of 1907 and Klafsky-Verzeichnis (Anton Maria Klafsky) of 1915
Michael Haydn	Perger, Lothar Herbert (1907). Instrumentalwerke: Michael Haydn. Denkmäler der Tonkunst in Österreich. Vol. 29. Vienna: Artaria. p. xv–xxiv.	P	Perger-Verzeichnis, 1907; also seen as Perger numbers; now generally superseded by Sherman and Thomas's 1993 catalogue (MH numbers)
Johann David Heinichen	Hausswald, Günter (1937). Johann David Heinichens Instrumentalwerke. Wolfenbüttel: G. Kallmeyer.	H	
Johann David Heinichen	Seibel, Gustav Adoplh (1913). Das Leben des Königl. polnischen und Kurfürstl. sächs. Hofkapellmeisters Johann David Heinichen ... Leipzig: Breitkopf & Härtel.	S	Reprinted by Westmead : Gregg International, Westmead, 1969. ISBN 0-576-28157-3
E. T. A. Hoffmann	Allroggen, Gerhard (1970). E. T. A. Hoffmanns Kompositionen; ein chronologisch-thematisches Verzeichnis seiner musikalischen Werke mit Einführung. Studien zur Musikgeschichte des 19. Jahrhunderts. Vol. 16. Regensburg: Gustav Bosse Verlag.	AV	
Gustav Holst	Holst, Imogen (1974). A thematic catalogue of Gustav Holst's music. London: Faber Music Ltd. : G. and I. Holst Ltd. ISBN 0-571-10004-X.	H	
Gottfried August Homilius	Wolf, Uwe (2014). Thematisches Verzeichnis der musikalischen Werke (HoWV). Ausgewählte Werke. Vol. Reihe 5, Supplement. Bd. 2. Stuttgart: Carus. ISBN 978-3-89948-186-0.	HoWV	
Arthur Honegger	Halbreich, Harry (1999). Arthur Honegger. Portland, Oregon: Amadeus Press. ISBN 1-57467-041-7.	H	L'Oeuvre d'Arthur Honegger: Chronologie, catalogue raisonné, analyses, discographie (1994)
Pelham Humfrey	Dennison, Peter (1986). Pelham Humfrey. Oxford studies of composers. Vol. 21. Oxford: Oxford University Press. ISBN 0-19-315244-4.		
Johann Nepomuk Hummel	Sachs, Joel (June 1974). "A checklist of the works of Johann Nepomuk Hummel". MLA Notes. 30 (4): 732–754. doi:10.2307/897020. JSTOR 741459.	S	
Johann Nepomuk Hummel	Zimmerschied, Dieter (1971). Thematisches Verzeichnis der Werke von Johann Nepomuk Hummel. Hofheim am Taunus.		
Engelbert Humperdinck	Humperdinck, Eva (1994). Engelbert Humperdinck Werkverzeichnis: zum 140. Geburtstag: seinem Andenken gewidmet. Koblenz: Görres Verlag. ISBN 3-920388-38-0.	EHWV	
Leoš Janáček	Simeone, Nigel; Tyrrell, John; Němcová, Alena (1997). Janáček's works: a catalogue of the music and writings of Leoš Janáček. Oxford, New York: Clarendon Press, Oxford University Press. ISBN 0-19-816446-7.	JW	
Henrik Philip Johnsen	Nordenfelt, Eva (1976). Hinrich Philip Johnsen 1717–1779 : biografi med verkförteckning. Stockholm.		Non-thematic catalogue
Leopold Kozeluch	Poštolka, Milan (1964). Leopold Koželuh : život a dílo. Praha: Státní hudební vydavatelství.	P	
Joseph Martin Kraus	Van Boer, Jr., Bertil H. (1998). Joseph Martin Kraus (1756–1792) : a Systematic-Thematic Catalogue of His Musical Works and Source Study. Thematic Catalogs. Vol. 26. Stuyvesant, New York: Pendragon Press. ISBN 0-945193-69-6.	B	Also seen as VB numbers
Johann Ludwig Krebs	Friedrich, Felix (2009). Krebs-Werkeverzeichnis (Krebs-WV) : thematisch-systematisches Verzeichnis der musikalischen Werke von Johann Ludwig Krebs (1713–1780). Altenburg: Kamprad. ISBN 978-3-930550-59-3.	Krebs-WV	
Conradin Kreutzer	Brecht, Karl Peter (1980). Conradin Kreutzer: Biographie und Werkverzeichnis. Messkirch: Stadt Messkirch.	KWV	
Franz Vincenz Krommer	Padrta, Karel (1997). Franz Krommer (1759–1831) : thematischer Katalog seiner musikalischen Werke. Praha: Editio Supraphon. ISBN 978-80-7058-388-3.	P	
Franz Vincenz Krommer	Walter, Horst (1932). Frank Krommer (1759–1831): sein Leben und Werk, mit besonderer Berücksichtigung der Streichquartette. Vienna. pp. 93–262.		
Friedrich Kuhlau	Fog, Dan (1977). Kompositionen von Friedr. Kuhlau : thematisch-bibliographischer Katalog. Kopenhagen: Dan Fog. ISBN 87-87099-09-8.		
Michel-Richard de Lalande	Sawkins, Lionel (2005). A thematic catalogue of the works of Michel-Richard de Lalande (1657–1726). New York: Oxford University Press. ISBN 0-19-816360-6.	S	
Jean-Marie Leclair	Leconte, Thomas (2005) Catalogue des oeuvres de Jean-Marie Leclair	JML	
Jean-François Le Sueur	Mongrédien, Jean (1980). Catalogue thématique de l'œuvre complète du compositeur Jean-François Le Sueur (1760–1837). Thematic catalogues. Vol. 7. New York: Pendragon. ISBN 0-918728-12-6.		
Giovanni Legrenzi	Passadore, Francesco (2002). La sottigliezza dell'intendimento : catalogo tematico di Giovanni Legrenzi. Edizioni Fondazione Levi. Serie 3, Studi musicologici. C, Cataloghi e bibliografia. Vol. 10. Venezia: Fondazione Levi.		
Franz Liszt	Liszt, Franz (1855). Thematisches Verzeichniss der Werke von F. Liszt; von dem Autor verfasst. Leipzig: Breitkopf & Härtel.	L	
Franz Liszt	Rena Charnin Mueller and Maria Eckhardt	LW	
Franz Liszt	Raabe, Peter (1931). Franz Liszt. Stuttgart: Cotta.	R	Vol. 1 subtitled Liszts Leben; vol. 2 subtitled Liszts Schaffen; was updated and expanded by Humphrey Searle in 1954, and S numbers are now usual
Franz Liszt	Searle, Humphrey (1954). The music of Liszt. London: Williams & Norgate. pp. 155–195.	S	Searle's catalogue, published in 1954 as The Music of Liszt, built upon the 1931 catalogue devised by Peter Raabe
Franz Liszt	Winklhofer, Sharon (2004). Ferenc Liszt (1811–1886): list of works : comprehensively expanded from the catalogue of Humphrey Searle as revised by Sharon Winklhofer. Quaderni dell'Istituto Liszt. Vol. 3. Milano: Rugginenti Editore. ISBN 978-88-7665-433-6.	S	Revision of Searle's catalog
Pietro Antonio Locatelli	Dunning, Albert (1981). Pietro Antonio Locatelli : der Virtuose und seine Welt. Berlin: Frits Knuf. ISBN 90-6027-380-X.		
Matthew Locke	Harding, Rosamond E. M. (1971). A thematic catalogue of the works of Matthew Locke with a calendar of the main events of his life. Oxford: Alden & Mowbray.		
Albert Lortzing	Capelle, Irmlind (1994). Chronologisch-thematisches Verzeichnis der Werke von Gustav Albert Lortzing: (LoWV). Köln: Studio-Verlag. ISBN 978-3-89564-003-2.	LoWV	
Jean-Baptiste Lully	Schneider, Herbert (1981). Chronologisch-thematisches Verzeichnis sämtlicher Werke von Jean-Baptiste Lully (LMV). Mainzer Studien zur Musikwissenschaft. Vol. 14. Tutzing: Hans Schneider. ISBN 978-3-7952-0323-8.	LWV	
Pieter van Maldere	Rompaey, Willy van (1990). Pieter van Maldere, 1729–1768. Aartselaar: Rompaey.		Lists instrumental works only
Alessandro Marcello	Selfridge-Field, Eleanor (1990). The music of Benedetto and Alessandro Marcello: a thematic catalogue with commentary on the composers, repertory, and sources. New York: Oxford University Press. ISBN 978-0-19-316126-9.	S	
Benedetto Marcello	Selfridge-Field, Eleanor (1990). The music of Benedetto and Alessandro Marcello: a thematic catalogue with commentary on the composers, repertory, and sources. New York: Oxford University Press. ISBN 978-0-19-316126-9.	S	The catalogue also lists the works of Benedetto Marcello's wife Rosanna Scalfi Marcello
Bohuslav Martinů	Halbreich, Harry (2007). Bohuslav Martinu: Werkverzeichnis und Biografie (2nd ed.). Mainz: Schott. ISBN 978-3-7957-0565-7.	H	
Bohuslav Martinů	Šafránek, Miloš (1961). Bohuslav Martinů: život a dílo. Praha: Státní hudební. pp. 341–375.	Saf	
Erkki Melartin	Poroila, Heikki (2016). Erkki Melartinin teosluettelo – Erkki Melartin Werkverzeichnis – Erkki Melartin work catalog. Suomen musiikkikirjastoyhdistyksen julkaisusarja. Vol. 135. Helsinki: Suomen musiikkikirjastoyhdistys. ISBN 978-952-5363-34-0.	EM	EM codes only for works without opus numbering and in the PDF version of the catalogue. In Finnish only. Non-thematic catalogue.
Frederick Marvin		M	
Fanny Mendelssohn	Hellwig-Unruh, Renate (2000). Fanny Hensel geb. Mendelssohn Bartholdy: thematisches Verzeichnis der Kompositionen. Adliswil: Kunzelmann. ISBN 3-9521049-3-0.	H	
Felix Mendelssohn	Wehner, Ralf (2009). Felix Mendelssohn-Bartholdy: Thematisch-systematisches Verzeichnis der musikalischen Werke (MWV). Leipziger Ausgabe der Werke von Felix Mendelssohn Bartholdy. Serie 13, Werkverzeichnis. Vol. Band 1 A. Wiesbaden. ISBN 978-3-7651-0317-9.	MWV	
Ernest John Moeran	Foss, Hubert J. (1948). Compositions of E. J. Moeran. London: Novello.	R	
Johann Melchior Molter	Häfner, Klaus (1996). Der badische Hofkapellmeister Johann Melchior Molter (1696–1765) in seiner Zeit : Dokumente und Bilder zu Leben und Werk (mit einem Beitrag von Rainer Fürst) : eine Austellung der Badischen Landesbibliothek Karlsruhe zum 300. Geburtstag des Komponisten. Karlsruhe: Selbstverlag der Badischen Landesbibliothek. pp. 243–262. ISBN 3-88705-041-X.	MWV	Non-thematic catalogue
Georg Matthias Monn	Horwitz, Karl; Riedel, Karl; Fischer, Wilhelm (1959). Wiener Instrumentalmusik vor und um 1740 : Vorlaufer der Wiener Klassiker: Johann Adam Georg Reutter (der Jungere), Georg Christoph Wagenseil, Georg Matthias Monn, Matthaeus Schloger, Joseph Starzer. Denkmaler der Tonkunst in Osterreich. Vol. Band 31, 39. Graz: Akademische Druck- u. Verlagsanstalt.	F	
Johann Christoph Monn	Horwitz, Karl; Riedel, Karl; Fischer, Wilhelm (1959). Wiener Instrumentalmusik vor und um 1740 : Vorlaufer der Wiener Klassiker: Johann Adam Georg Reutter (der Jungere), Georg Christoph Wagenseil, Georg Matthias Monn, Matthaeus Schloger, Joseph Starzer. Denkmaler der Tonkunst in Osterreich. Vol. Band 31, 39. Graz: Akademische Druck- u. Verlagsanstalt.	F	
Claudio Monteverdi	Stattkus, Manfred H. (1985). Claudio Monteverdi, Verzeichnis der erhaltenen Werke (SV). Bergkamen: Musikverlag Stattkus.	SV	The Stattkus-Verzeichnis is based on Stattkus's Claudio Monteverdi: Verzeichnis der erhaltenen Werke, 1985
Franz Xaver Mozart	Nottelmann, Carsten (2009). W. A. Mozart Sohn : der Musiker und das Erbe des Vaters. Bd 2, Systematisches chronologisches Verzeichnis der Kompositionen von W. A. Mozart Sohn. Schriftenreihe der Internationalen Stiftung Mozarteum Salzburg. Vol. 14. Kassel: Bärenreiter. ISBN 978-3-7618-2164-0.	WV	
Leopold Mozart	Eisen, Cliff (2010). Leopold-Mozart-Werkverzeichnis (LMV). Beiträge zur Leopold-Mozart-Forschung. Vol. 4. Augsburg: Wissner. ISBN 978-3-89639-757-7.	LMV	
Leopold Mozart	Seiffert, Max (1908). Ausgewählte Werke. Denkmäler der Tonkunst in Bayern. Vol. 17, 9. Leipzig: Breitkopf & Härtel.	S	
Wolfgang Amadeus Mozart	Köchel, Ludwig van Ritter (1964). Franz Giegling; Alexander Weinmann; Gerd Sievers (eds.). Chronologisch-thematisches Verzeichnis sämtlicher Tonwerke Wolfgang Amadé Mozarts; nebst Angabe der verlorengegangenen, angefangenen, von fremder Hand bearbeiteten, zweifelhaften und unterschobenen Kompositionen (6th ed.). Wiesbaden: Breitkopf & Härtel.	K or KV	Mozart's opus numbers are particularly scattered and useless and are no longer used at all (for instance, there are two sets of violin sonatas both called Op. 1). Köchel's Chronologisch-thematisches Verzeichnis sämmtlicher Tonwerke W. A. Mozarts was published in 1862 and has been substantially revised four times since then.
Wolfgang Amadeus Mozart	Wyzewa, Teodor de; Saint-Foix, Georges de (1912). W.-A. Mozart, sa vie musicale et son œuvre de l'enfance à la pleine maturité (1756–1777): Essai de biographie critique, suivi d'un nouveau catalogue chronologique de l'œuvre complète du maitre. Paris: Perrin et Cie.	WSF	
Gottlieb Muffat	Dunlop, Alison J. (2013). The life and works of Gottlieb Muffat (1690–1770). Vienna: Hollitzer. ISBN 978-3-99012-084-2.		
Jan Neruda	Pilková, Zdeňka (1999). Jan Jiří (Johann Georg) Neruda. Edition IME. Reihe 1. Vol. 1. Sinzig: Studio. ISBN 3-89564-058-1.		Included in " Beiträge zur Musikgeschichte Ostmittel-, Ost- und Südosteuropas"
Sigismund Neukomm	Angemüller, Rudolph (1977). Sigismund Neukomm : Werkverzeichnis, Autobiographie, Beziehung zu seinen Zeitgenossen. Musikwissenschaftliche Schriften. Vol. 4. München: Katzbichler. ISBN 3-87397-103-8.	NV	
Josef Mysliveček	Evans, Angela; Dearling, Robert (1999). Josef Mysliveček (1737–1781): a thematic catalogue of his instrumental and orchestral works. München: Katzbichler. ISBN 978-3-87397-132-5.	ED	
Josef Mysliveček	Freeman, Daniel E. (2009). Josef Mysliveček, "Il boemo": the man and his music. Detroit monographs in musicology/Studies in music. Vol. 54. Sterling Heights, Mich.: Harmonie Park Press. ISBN 978-0-89990-148-0.		Non-thematic catalogue
Josef Mysliveček	Bonhadlo, Stanislav (28 August 2001). "Josef Mysliveček/Giuseppe Misliweczek: Thematic Catalog of Vocal Works". Archived from the original on 1 February 2014.		
Carl Nielsen	"Catalogue of Carl Nielsen's Works". Copenhagen: Danish Centre for Music Publication, The Royal Library. 2015.	CNW	
Carl Nielsen	Fog, Dan (1965). Carl Nielsen, kompositioner; en bibliografi. København: Nyt Nordisk Forlag.	FS	
O'Kelly family	Klein, Axel (2014). O'Kelly. An Irish Musical Family in Nineteenth-Century France. Norderstedt: BoD. ISBN 978-3-7357-2310-9.	OKC	O'Kelly Catalogue (OKC), pp. 367–450, comprises compositions by five members of the family incl. Joseph O'Kelly (1828–1885), George O'Kelly (1831–1914), and Henri O'Kelly (1859–1938).
Karl von Ordonez	Brown, A. Peter (1978). Carlo d'Ordonez, 1734–1786 : a thematic catalog. Detroit studies in music bibliography. Vol. 39. Detroit: Information Coordinators. ISBN 0-911772-89-8.		
Johann Pachelbel	Perreault, Jean M. (2004). The thematic catalogue of the musical works of Johann Pachelbel. Lanham, Md.: Scarecrow Press.	P	
Ferdinando Paër	Ensslin, Wolfram (2004). Chronologisch-thematisches Verzeichnis der Werke Ferdinando Paërs. Bd 1, Die Opern. Musikwissenschaftliche Publikationen. Vol. 23. Hildesheim: Olms. ISBN 3-487-11947-1.	PaWV	Only vol. 1, containing the operas, published so far.
Niccolò Paganini	Moretti, Maria Rosa; Sorrento, Anna (1982). Catalogo tematico delle musiche di Niccolò Paganini. Genova: Comune di Genova.	MS	
Giovanni Paisiello	Robinson, Michael F.; Hofmann, Ulrike (1994). Giovanni Paisiello, a thematic catalogue of his works. Thematic catalogues. Vol. 15. Stuyvesant, N.Y.: Pendragon Press. ISBN 0-918728-75-4.	R	
Selim Palmgren	Poroila, Heikki (2014). Selim Palmgrenin sävellykset – Förteckning – Werkverzeichnis – Work Catalogue (PDF). Suomen musiikkikirjastoyhdistyksen julkaisusarja. Vol. 167. Helsinki: Suomen musiikkikirjastoyhdistys. ISBN 978-952-5363-66-1.	SP	SP codes only for works without opus numbering. In Finnish with a multilingual legend. Non-thematic catalogue.
Giovanni Battista Pergolesi	Paymer, Marvin E. (1977). Giovanni Battista Pergolesi, 1710–1736 : a thematic catalogue of the Opera omnia : with an appendix listing omitted compositions. Thematic catalogues. Vol. 1. New York: Pendragon Press. ISBN 0-918728-01-0.	P	
Wilhelm Peterson-Berger	Karlsson, Henrik (2017). Wilhelm Peterson-Berger : kompositioner. Stockholm: Musik- och teaterbiblioteket.		
Giuseppe Ottavio Pitoni	Gmeinwieser, Siegfried (1976). Giuseppe Ottavio Pitoni : thematisches Werkverzeichnis. Sacri concentus. Vol. 2. Wilhelmshafen: Heinrichshofen. ISBN 3-7959-0212-6.		
Pla	Dolcet, Josep (1987). L'obra dels germans Pla : bases per una catalogacío. Anuario musical. Vol. 42. ISSN 0211-3538.		Lists works by Josep Pla, Joan Baptista Pla and Manuel Pla.
Giovanni Benedetto Platti	Iesuè, Alberto (1999). Le opere di Giovanni Benedetto Platti, 1697–1763 : catalogo tematico. Padova: Ed. de I solisti veneti.	I	
Ignaz Pleyel	Benton, Rita (1977). Ignace Pleyel: a thematic catalogue of his compositions. Thematic Catalogs. Vol. 2. New York: Pendragon Press. ISBN 0-918728-04-5.	B	Also seen as Ben
Francis Poulenc	Schmidt, Carl B. (1995). The music of Francis Poulenc (1899–1963): a catalogue. New York: Oxford University Press. ISBN 0-19-816336-3.	FP	
Giacomo Puccini	Schickling, Dieter (2003). Giacomo Puccini : catalogue of the works. Kassel: Bärenreiter. ISBN 3-7618-1582-4.	SC	
Gaetano Pugnani	Zschinsky-Troxler, Elsa Margherita (1939). Thematisches Werkverzeichniss. Berlin: Antalntis-Verlag.	Z	
Henry Purcell	Zimmermann, Franklin B. (1963). Henry Purcell (1659–1695): An analytical catalogue of his music. London: MacMillan.	Z	
Johann Joachim Quantz	Brink, Meike ten (1995). Die Flötenkonzerte von Johann Joachim Quantz: Untersuchungen zu ihrer Überlieferung und Form. Studien und Materialien zur Musikwissenschaft. Vol. 11. Hildesheim: Georg Olms. ISBN 3-487-10076-2.	B	
Johann Joachim Quantz	Augsbach, Horst (1997). Johann Joachim Quantz : thematisch-systematisches Werkverzeichnis (QV). Stuttgart: Carus-Verlag. ISBN 978-3-923053-47-6.	QV	
Sergei Rachmaninoff	Threlfall, Robert; Norris, Geoffrey (1982). A catalogue of the compositions of S. Rachmaninoff. London: Scolar Press. ISBN 978-0-85967-617-5.	TN	
Maurice Ravel	Marnat, Marcel (1986). Maurice Ravel. Paris: Fayard. pp. 721–784. ISBN 978-2-213-01685-6.	MR	
Josef Reicha	Reinländer, Claus (1992). Josef Rejcha : thematisch-systematisches Werkverzeichnis. Puchheim: Ed. Engel.		
Antonín Reichenauer	Kapsa, Václav (2010). Hudebníci hraběte Morzina : příspěvvek k dějinám šlechtických kapel v Čechách v době baroka. Praha: Akademie věd České republiky. ISBN 978-80-87112-36-6.		Lists instrumental works only. Also listed are works by Christian Gottlieb Postel and František Jiránek.
Ottorino Respighi	Battaglia, Elio; Rostirolla, Giancarlo (1985). Ottorino Respighi. Turin: ERI.	P	Catalogue by Potito Pedarra on pages 327–404
Ottorino Respighi	Pedarra, Potito. Catalogo tematico delle musiche di Ottorino Respighi.	P	Forthcoming
Josef Rheinberger	Irmen, Hans Josef (1974). Thematisches Verzeichnis der musikalischen Werke Gabriel Josef Rheinbergers. Studien zur Musikgeschichte des 19. Jahrhunderts. Vol. 37. Regensburg: Gustav Bosse. ISBN 978-3-7649-2080-7.	RWV	Also seen as JWV
Ferdinand Ries	Hill, Cecil (1977). Ferdinand Ries : a thematic catalogue. University of New England monographs. Vol. 1. Armidale: University of New England. ISBN 0-85834-156-5.		
Christian Ulrich Ringmacher (publisher)	Ringmacher, Christian Ulrich; Brook, Barry S. (1987). Catalogo de' soli, duetti, trii: The Ringmacher Catalogue (1773). Thematic Catalogues. Vol. 14. Stuyvesant, New York: Pendragon Press. ISBN 978-0-918728-91-3.		Facsimile reprint of the 1773 catalogue containing 112 pages with 627 incipits by 148 composers.
Alessandro Rolla	Inzaghi, Luigi; Bianchi, Luigi Alberto (1981). Alessandro Rolla: catalogo tematico delle opere. Milano: Nuove edizioni.	BI	
Johann Heinrich Rolle	Waczkat, Andreas (2007). Johann Heinrich Rolles musikalische Dramen : Theorie, Werkbestand und Überlieferung einer Gattung im Kontext bürgerlicher Empfindsamkeit. Schriften zur mitteldeutschen Musikgeschichte. Vol. 15. Beeskow: Ortus. ISBN 978-3-937788-13-5.	RolleV	Non-thematic catalogue
Johan Helmich Roman	Bengtsson, Ingmar (1955). J. H. Roman och hans instrumentalmusik: käll- och stilkritiska studier. Studia musicologica Upsaliensia. Vol. 4. Uppsala.	BeRI	Lists instrumental works
Johan Helmich Roman	Holm, Anna-Lena; Bengtsson, Ingmar (1994). Tematisk förteckning över J. H. Romans vokalverk (HRV). Musik I Sverige. Vol. 7. Stockholm: Musikaliska Akademiens Bibliotek. ISBN 978-91-85172-12-2.	HRV	Lists vocal works
Johann Rosenmüller	Snyder, Kerala J. (1970). Johann Rosenmüller's music for solo voice. New Haven, Conn.: Yale University Press.		Lists vocal music only. Non-thematic catalogue.
Antonio Rosetti	Kaul, Oskar (1968). Thematisches Verzeichnis der Instrumentalwerke von Anton Rosetti. Mit Angabe der Druckausgaben und der Fundorte erhaltener Exemplare in Druck und Handschrift. Wiesbaden: Breitkopf & Härtel.	Kaul	Rosetti's works are usually now given with catalogue numbers by Sterling E. Murray, although older numbers from Oskar Kaul's 1912 catalogue sometimes appear as well
Antonio Rosetti	Murray, Sterling E. (1996). The music of Antonio Rosetti (Anton Rösler) ca. 1750–1792 : a thematic catalog. Detroit studies in music bibliography. Vol. 76. Warren, Michigan. ISBN 978-0-89990-105-3.	M	Also seen as Murray or RWV; Rosetti's works are usually given with catalogue numbers by Sterling E. Murray, although older numbers from Oskar Kaul's 1912 catalogue sometimes appear as well
Albert Roussel	Labelle, Nicole (1992). Catalogue raisonné de l'œuvre d'Albert Roussel. Publications d'histoire de l'art et d'archéologie de l'Université Catholique de Louvain; Musicologica neolovaniensia). Vol. 6, 78. Louvain-la-Neuve: Département d'archéologie et d'histoire de l'art, Collège Erasme.	L	
Friedrich Wilhelm Rust	Czach, Rudolf (1927). Friedrich Wilhelm Rust. Essen.		lists instrumental works only
Camille Saint-Saëns	Ratner, Sabina Teller (2002). Camille Saint-Saëns, 1835–1922: A Thematic Catalogue of his Complete Works. Oxford University Press.	R	
Giovanni Battista Sammartini	Jenkins, Newell; Churgin, Bathia (1976). Thematic catalogue of the works of Giovanni Battista Sammartini: orchestral and vocal music. Cambridge, Mass.: Harvard University Press. ISBN 978-0-674-87735-1.	JC	
Allen Sapp	Green, Alan (1996). Allen Sapp: A Bio-Bibliography. Bio-Bibliographies in Music. Vol. 62. Westport, Connecticut: Greenwood Press. ISBN 0-313-28983-2.	W	Non-thematic catalogue
Alessandro Scarlatti	Pagano, Roberto (1972). Alessandro Scarlatti / Roberto Pagano, Lino Bianchi; catalogo generale delle opere a cura di Giancarlo Rostoirolla. Torino.		Non-thematic catalogue
Domenico Scarlatti	Goldberg, Laurette; Mathews, Patrice (1999). Domenico Scarlatti : thematic index of the keyboard sonatas according to the Kirkpatrick catalogue. Berkeley, Calif.: MusicSources Publications.		Includes concordances of numbering by Kirkpatrick, Longo, Fadini, and of key
Domenico Scarlatti	Kirkpatrick, Ralph (1983). Domenico Scarlatti. Princeton, N.J.: Princeton University Press. ISBN 0-691-09101-3.	Kk	
Domenico Scarlatti	Longo, Alessandro (c. 1937). Indice tematico delle sonate per clavicembalo = Table thématique des sonates pour clavecin = Thematisches Verzeichnis des Sonaten für Klavizimbel = Thematic index of the harpsichord sonatas = Indice temático de las sonatas para clave. Milano: Ricordi.	L	
Domenico Scarlatti	Giorgio Pestelli	P	
Domenico Scarlatti	Beaudry, Claude (1994). Domenico Scarlatti, les 555 sonates pour clavecin : table de concordance des catalogues Kirkpatrick, Pestelli, Longo. Ste-Foy: Bibliothèque, Université Laval.	P	Concordance of the catalogues
Christoph Schaffrath	Oestreich, Reinhard (2012). Verzeichnis der Werke Christoph Schaffraths (CSWV). Ortus Studien. Vol. 7. Beeskow: Ortus. ISBN 978-3-937788-22-7.	CSWV	
Johann Adolph Scheibe	Hauge, Peter (2018). Johann Adolph Scheibe: A Catalogue of His Works. Danish Humanist Texts and Studies. Vol. 58. Royal Danish Library. ISBN 978-87-635-4560-0.	SchW	
Samuel Scheidt	Koch, Klaus-Peter (2000). Samuel-Scheidt-Werke-Verzeichnis. Wiesbaden: Breitkopf & Härtel. ISBN 978-3-7651-0332-2.	SSWV	
Peter Schickele/ P. D. Q. Bach	"Peter Schickele – Compositions". schickele.com; Schickele, Peter (1976). The Definitive Biography of P.D.Q. Bach. New York: Random House. ISBN 0-394-46536-9. OCLC 1694191.	S.	In character with P. D. Q. Bach's work, these are usually humorous.
Franz Schneider	Freeman, Robert N. (1979). Franz Schneider (1737–1812): a thematic catalogue of his works. Thematic Catalogues. Vol. 5. New York: Pendragon Press. ISBN 978-0-918728-13-5.		
Arnold Schoenberg	Rufer, Josef (1959). Das Werk Arnold Schönbergs. Kassel: Bärenreiter-Verlag.		
Franz Schubert	Otto Erich Deutsch. Schubert Thematic Catalogue. Major editions: 1951 (English), 1978 (German)	D	There are also 173 opus numbers, see Schubert opus/Deutsch number concordance
Robert Schumann	McCorkle, Margit L. (2003). Robert Schumann neue Ausgabe sämtlicher Werke : thematisch-bibliographisches Werkverzeichnis. Neue Ausgabe sämtlicher Werke. Serie VIII, Supplemente. Vol. 6. Mainz: Schott.	WoO	
Heinrich Schütz	Bittinger, Werner (1960). Schütz-Werke-Verzeichnis (SWV). Kassel: Bärenreiter.	SWV	
Carlos de Seixas	Kastner, Macario Santiago (1947). Carlos de Seixas. Coimbra: Coimbra Editora. pp. 135–44.	K	
Maddalena Laura Sirmen and Lodovico Sirmen	Passadore, Francesco (2008). Catalogo tematico delle composizioni di Maddalena Lombardini Sirmen e Ludovico Sirmen. Padova: Edizioni de "I solisti veneti". ISBN 978-88-901412-7-0.		
Antonio Soler	Rubio, Samuel (1980). Antonio Soler, catálogo crítico. Cuenca: Instituto de Música Religiosa de la Diputación Provincial de Cuenca.	R	
Kaikhosru Shapurji Sorabji	Rapoport, Paul (1992). Sorabji: A Critical Celebration. Aldershot, UK: Scolar Press [now Ashgate Publishing]. ISBN 0-85967-923-3.	KSS	
Johannes Matthias Sperger	Meier, Adolf (1990). Thematisches Werkverzeichnis der Kompositionen von Johannes Sperger (1750–1812). Dokumentationen – Reprints / Kultur- und Forschungsstätte Michaelstein. Vol. 21. Michaelstein/Blankenburg: Kultur-und Forschungsstätte.		
Anton Stamitz	Sandberger, Adolf (1902). Denkmäler der Tonkunst in Bayern. 3. Jahrgang. Vol. Band 1. Leipzig: Breitkopf & Härtel. pp. liv.	S	Thematic catalogue of symphonies and symphonies concertantes
Anton Stamitz	Sandberger, Adolf (1915). Denkmäler der Tonkunst in Bayern. 16. Jahrgang. Leipzig: Breitkopf & Härtel. pp. li–liii.	S	Thematic catalogue of chamber music
Johann Stamitz	Wolf, Eugene K. (1981). The symphonies of Johann Stamitz : a study in the formation of the classic style with a thematic catalogue of the symphonies and orchestral trios. Utrecht: Bohn, Scheltema & Holkema. ISBN 978-90-313-0346-5.	W	
Johann Stamitz	Gradenwitz, Peter (1984). Johann Stamitz : Leben, Umwelt, Werke. T. 2, Die Werke. Taschenbücher zur Musikwissenschaft. Vol. 94. Wilhelmshaven: Heinrichshofen. ISBN 3-7959-0342-4.		
Joseph Anton Steffan	Picton, Howard J. (1989). The life and works of Joseph Anton Steffan (1726–1797) : with special reference to his keyboard concertos. Outstanding dissertations in music from British universities. New York: Garland. ISBN 0-8240-2345-5.		
Johann Franz Xaver Sterkel	Scharnagl, Augustin (1943). Johann Franz Xaver Sterkel : ein Beitrag zur Musikgeschichte Mainfrankens. Würzburg: Triltsch.	StWV	
Alessandro Stradella	Gianturco, Carolyn (1991). Alessandro Stradella (1639–1682): a thematic catalogue of his compositions. Thematic catalogues. Vol. 16. Stuyvesant, New York: Pendragon Press. ISBN 0-945193-05-X.	G	
Richard Strauss	Mueller von Asow, E. H.; Trenner, Florian; Ott, Alfons (1955). Richard Strauss: thematisches Verzeichnis. Vienna: Ludwig Doblinger. OCLC 4006988.	AV	See also TrV.
Richard Strauss	Trenner, Franz (1993). Richard Strauss: Werkverzeichnis. Veröffentlichungen der Richard-Strauss-Gesellschaft, München. Vol. 12. München: W. Ludwig. ISBN 978-3-7787-2137-7.	TrV	Based on the work by Asow and Trenner
Igor Stravinsky	Kirchmeyer, Helmut (2002). Kommentiertes Verzeichnis der Werke und Werkausgaben Igor Strawinskys bis 1971. Abhandlungen der Sächsischen Akademie der Wissenschaften zu Leipzig, Philologisch-Historische Klasse. Vol. 79. Leipzig: Verlag der Sächsischen Akademie der Wissenschaften zu Leipzig. ISBN 978-3-7776-1156-3.	K	
Jan Pieterszoon Sweelinck	Gustav Leonhardt	L	
Franz Xaver Süssmayr	Duda, Erich (2000). Das musikalische Werk Franz Xaver Süssmayrs : thematisches Werkverzeichnis (SmWV) mit ausführlichen Quellenangaben und Skizzen der Wasserzeichen. Schriftenreihe der Internationalen Stiftung Mozarteum Salzburg. Vol. 12. Kassel: Bärenreiter. ISBN 978-3-7618-1485-7.	SmWV	
Giuseppe Tartini	Brainard, Paul (1975). Le sonate per violino di Giuseppe Tartini: catalogo tematico. Le opere di Giuseppe Tartini; sezione terza : studi e ricerche di studiosi moderni. Vol. 2. Padova: Accademia Tartiniana.	B	
Giuseppe Tartini	Dounias, Minos (1966). Die Violinkonzerte Giuseppe Tartinis als Ausdruck einer Künstlerpersönlichkeit und einer Kulturepoche. Wolfenbüttel: Möseler.	D	
Pyotr Ilyich Tchaikovsky	Vaĭdman, Polina Efimovna; Korabelnikova, Liudmila; Rubtsova, Valentina (2006). Tematiko-bibliograficheskiĭ ukazatelʹ sochineniĭ P.I. Chaĭkovskogo. Moscow: P. Jurgenson. ISBN 978-5-9720-0001-2.	ČW	Thematic and Bibliographical Catalogue of P. I. Čajkovskij's Works (2006)
Pyotr Ilyich Tchaikovsky	Poznansky, Alexander; Langston, Brett (2002). Tchaikovsky Handbook. Russian music studies. Bloomington, Indiana: Indiana University Press. ISBN 978-0-253-33921-8.	TH	The Tchaikovsky Handbook
Georg Philipp Telemann	Ruhnke, Martin (1984–1999). Georg Philipp Telemann: thematisch-systematisches Verzeichnis seiner Werke : Telemann-Werkverzeichnis (TWV) : Instrumentalwerke. Georg Philipp Telemann, Musikalische Werke. Vol. Supplement. Kassel: Bärenreiter. ISBN 978-3-7618-0655-5.	TWV	The Telemann-Werke-Verzeichnis is based on Georg Philipp Telemann: thematische-Verzeichnis seiner Werke Systematische, 3 vols. (1984, 1992, 1999)
Luigi Tomasini	Korcak, Friedrich (1952). Luigi Tomasini (1741–1808) : Konzertmeister der fürstlich Esterhazyschen Kapelle in Eisenstadt unter Joseph Haydn. Vienna: University of Vienna.	Kor	
Giuseppe Torelli	Passadore, Francesco (2007). Catalogo tematico delle composizioni di Giuseppe Torelli (1658–1709). Padova: I solisti veneti. ISBN 978-88-901412-6-3.		
Giuseppe Torelli	Giegling, Franz (1949). Giuseppe Torelli: thematisches Verzeichnis. Kassel: Bärenreiter.	G	
Troubadour	Mayer-Martin, Donna J. (2011). Thematic catalogue of troubadour and trouvère melodies. Thematic Catalogues. Vol. 18. Stuyvesant, New York: Penddragon Press. ISBN 978-0-918728-82-1.		
Eduard Tubin	Rumessen, Vardo (2003). The works of Eduard Tubin: thematic-bibliographical catalogue of works: ETW. Tallinn: International Eduard Tubin Society. ISBN 978-91-7748-054-9.	ETW	
Heitor Villa-Lobos	H. Villa-Lobos: Piano Thematic Catalog. New York: Villa-Lobos Music Co. 1948.	A	
Giovanni Battista Viotti	White, Chappell (1985). Giovanni Battista Viotti (1755–1824), a thematic catalogue of his works. Thematic Catalogue Series. Vol. 12. New York: Pendragon Press. ISBN 978-0-918728-43-2.	W	
Giovanni Battista Viotti	Giazotto, Remo (1956). Giovan Battista Viotti. Milano: Curci.	G	
Antonio Vivaldi	Fanna, Antonio (1986). Opere strumentali di Antonio Vivaldi (1678–1741): catalogo numerico-tematico (2a edizione riveduta e ampliata ed.). Milano: Ricordi. ISBN 88-7592-022-2.	F	
Antonio Vivaldi	Malipiero, Gian Francisco (1968). Antonio Vivaldi (1678–1741): Catalogo numerico-tematico delle opere strumentali. Milano: Ricordi.	M	
Antonio Vivaldi	Pincherle, Marc (1948). Antonio Vivaldi et la musique instrumentale. Paris: Floury.	P	
Antonio Vivaldi	Rinaldi, Mario (1944). Catalogo numerico tematico delle composizioni di Antonio Vivaldi, con la definizione delle tonalità, l'indicazione dei movimenti e varie tabelle illustrative. Roma: Editrice Cultura moderna.	RN	
Antonio Vivaldi	Ryom, Peter (1973). Antonio Vivaldi : thematisch-systematisches Verzeichnis seiner Werke (RV). Wiesbaden: Breitkopf & Härtel. ISBN 978-3-7651-0372-8.	RV	Supersedes all previous catalogues. Appendix contains concordance to all Vivaldi thematic catalogs.
Georg Joseph Vogler	Schafhäutl, Karl Emil von (1887). Abt Georg Joseph Vogler : sein Leben, Charakter und musikalisches System : seine Werke, seine Schule, Bildnisse &c. Augsburg: Huttler.		
Antonín Vranický	Hennigová-Dubová, Eva (November 1984). "Thematic Index: Vranický". The Symphony, 1720–1840. B. Vol. 12. New York: Garland. pp. xlv–xlvi. ISBN 978-0-8240-3848-9.	RV	
Georg Christoph Wagenseil	Scholz-Michelitsch, Helga (1966). Das Klavierwerk von Georg Christoph Wagenseil: Thematischer Katalog. Vienna: Böhlau in Kommission. ISBN 9783700110965.	WV	
Georg Christoph Wagenseil	Scholz-Michelitsch, Helga (1972). Das Orchester- und Kammermusikwerk von Georg Christoph Wagenseil: thematischer Katalog. Vienna: Böhlau in Kommission. ISBN 9783205031758.	WV	
Richard Wagner	Deathridge, John; Geck, Martin; Voss, Egon (1986). Wagner Werk-Verzeichnis (WWV): Verzeichnis der musikalischen Werke Richard Wagners und ihrer Quellen erarbeitet im Rahmen der Richard Wagner-Gesamtausgabe. Mainz: Schott. ISBN 978-3-7957-2201-2.	WWV	Also includes Wagner's literary works
William Walton	Craggs, Stewart R. (2014). William Walton Edition, Vol. 24: A Catalogue of Works. Oxford University Press. ISBN 978-0-19-368322-8.	C	Earlier versions: 1977, 1990
Johann Baptist Wanhal	Bryan, Paul Robey (1997). Johann Waṅhal, Viennese symphonist: his life and his musical environment. Thematic catalogues series. Vol. 23. Stuyvesant, New York: Pendragon Press. ISBN 978-0-945193-63-0.	B	
Johann Baptist Wanhal	Weinmann, Alexander (1987). Themen-Verzeichnis der Kompositionen von Johann Baptiste Wanhal. Wiener Archivstudien. Vol. Band 11. Vienna: Musikverlag Ludwig Krenn.	W	
Carl Maria von Weber	Jähns, Friedrich Wilhelm (1871). Carl Maria von Weber in seinen Werken: chronologisch-thematisches Verzeichniss seiner sämmtlichen Compositionen nebst Angabe der unvollständigen, verloren gegangenen, zweifelhaften und untergeschobenen mit Beschreibung der Autographen, Angabe der Ausgaben und Arrangements, kritischen, kunsthistorischen und biographischen Anmerkungen, unter Benutzung von Weber's Briefen und Tagebüchern und einer Beigabe von Nachbildungen seiner Handschrift. Berlin: Schlesinger.	J	
Anton Webern	Moldenhauer, Hans (1978). Anton von Webern: a chronicle of his life and work. London: Gollancz. pp. 697–750. ISBN 978-0-575-02436-6.	M	
Sylvius Leopold Weiss	Klima, Josef (1975). Silvius Leopold Weiss, 1686–1750: Kompositionen für die Laute: Quellen- und Themenverzeichnis. Maria Enzersdorf: Verlag Wiener Lautenarchiv, Josef Klima.	K	
Sylvius Leopold Weiss	Smith, Douglas Alton (1983). Complete works for lute. Das Erbe deutscher Musik. Sonderreihe. Vol. 11–14. Frankfurt, New York: C. F. Peters.	SC	Also seen as S-C
Sylvius Leopold Weiss	S.L.Weiss – Works	WeissSW	see List of compositions by Sylvius Leopold Weiss
Samuel Wesley	Olleson, Philip (2003). Samuel Wesley : the man and his music. Woolbridge: Boydell Press. ISBN 1-84383-031-0.	KO	
Christoph Ernst Friedrich Weyse	Fog, Dan (1979). Kompositionen von C.E.F. Weyse. Kopenhagen: Dan Fog. ISBN 87-87099-14-4.	DF	
Henryk Wieniawski	Jazdon, Andrzej (2009). Henryk Wieniawski: katalog tematyczny dziel: thematic catalogue of works, Poznań, ISBN 978-83-923344-3-9, https://www.wieniawski.pl/53-katalog-tematyczny.html.		
Joseph Woelfl	Haider-Dechant, Margit (2011). Joseph Woelfl : Verzeichnis seiner Werke. Vienna: Apollon Musikoffizin. ISBN 978-3-9502760-1-5.		
Jan Dismas Zelenka	Reich, Wolftgang (1985). Jan Dismas Zelenka : thematisch-systematisches Verzeichnis der musikalischen Werke (ZWV). Studien und Materialien zur Musikgeschichte Dresdens. Vol. 6. Dresden: Sächsische Landesbibliothek Dresden.	ZWV	
Bernd Alois Zimmermann	Henrich, Heribert (2014). Bernd Alois Zimmermann Werkverzeichnis: Verzeichnis der musikalischen Werke von Bernd Alois Zimmermann und ihrer Quellen. Mainz: Schott Music. ISBN 978-3-7957-0688-3.	BAZ	Includes previously unpublished notes and letters by Zimmermann. First critical, musicologically based catalogue of a composer of the second half of the 20th century.
