= Calame =

Calame is a surname. Notable people with the surname include:

- Alexandre Calame (1810–1864), Swiss painter
- André Calame, Swiss figure skater
- Byron Calame (born 1939), American journalist
- Claude Calame (born 1943), Swiss writer on Greek mythology
- Geneviève Calame (1946–1993), Swiss pianist, music educator and composer
- Ingrid Calame (born 1965), American artist
- Marie-Anne Calame (1775–1834), Swiss miniaturist and philanthropist educator
