= Giovanni Biamonti =

Italian musicologist

Giovanni Biamonti (12 October 1889 – 4 July 1970) was an Italian musicologist best known for his work on the composer Ludwig van Beethoven. Administrative secretary of the Accademia Nazionale di Santa Cecilia from 1924 to 1963, Biamonti's greatest achievement was his eponymous catalogue of Beethoven's complete works, including many not contained in either the Beethoven Gesamtausgabe, or Kinsky/Halm or Hess catalogues. Arranged chronologically, it contains a total of 849 works, including sketches and fragments stretching from the variations for piano on a march by Ernst Christoph Dressler of 1782 to Beethoven's last bars in 1827.

== Works ==
- Giovanni Biamonti: Catalogo cronologico e tematico delle opere di Beethoven comprese quelle inedite e gli abbozzi non utilizzati, Turin: Industria Libraria Tipografica Editrice, 1968 OCLC 915852950

== See also ==
- Biamonti Catalogue
- Catalogues of Beethoven compositions
- List of compositions by Ludwig van Beethoven
