= Biamonti Catalogue =

The Biamonti Catalogue is a catalogue of Ludwig van Beethoven's compositions published in 1968 by the Turin-based publisher Industria Libraria Tipografica Editrice. The original name of the work is Catalogo cronologico e tematico di tutte le opere di Beethoven, comprese quelle inedite e gli abbozzi non utilizzati. Giovanni Biamonti tried to combine all pieces of the author, including all works approached in other catalogues (the opus, Kinsky–Halm Catalogue, Hess and Grove), in a single chronological listing. All other catalogues are numbered by date of publishing. The numeration system used is "Bia" plus the number attributed to the piece in the catalogue.

In addition to including the 138 Opus numbers, the 205 WoOs of the Kinsky/Halm Catalogue, the 335 numbers of the Hess Catalogue, previously catalogued, the Biamonti Catalogue includes an important revision appendix to the three so-called official catalogues, accompanied by a personal catalogue including all the other fragments, unused sketches, notes, cues, various unused musical hints scattered in the letters, in the album sheets, in the notebooks of sketches and in the conversation notebooks known at the time of its publication. Although Biamonti's work comprises 849 entries, including published and unpublished pieces, and even fragments, from 1782 to March 1827, there are some that Biamonti could not have known about, and so there is still no single catalog with all of Beethoven's compositions.

== See also ==
- Catalogues of Beethoven compositions
- List of compositions by Ludwig van Beethoven
