= Catalogues of Beethoven compositions =

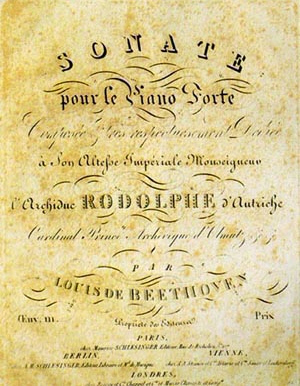
Original title page for Beethoven's last Piano Sonata, Opus 111

The catalogues of Beethoven compositions are all of the different ways in which the musical compositions by Ludwig van Beethoven have been organized by researchers into his music.

== The problem ==
Most of Beethoven's best known works were published with opus numbers, with which they may be reliably identified. Another 228 works are designated WoO (Werke ohne Opuszahl – literally, "works without an opus number"), among them unpublished early and occasional works (Cantata on the Death of Emperor Joseph II, WoO 87), published variations and folksong arrangements (25 Irish Songs, WoO 152), posthumous publications ("Für Elise", WoO 59), and a number of unfinished works. The WoO list was extended but still left unaccounted for many fragments and sketches as well as numerous cases of uncertain attribution.

The catalogues described here are attempts to organize and identify with precision all of these works in ways that are useful to musicologists, musicians, and the listening public.

== Opus number ==
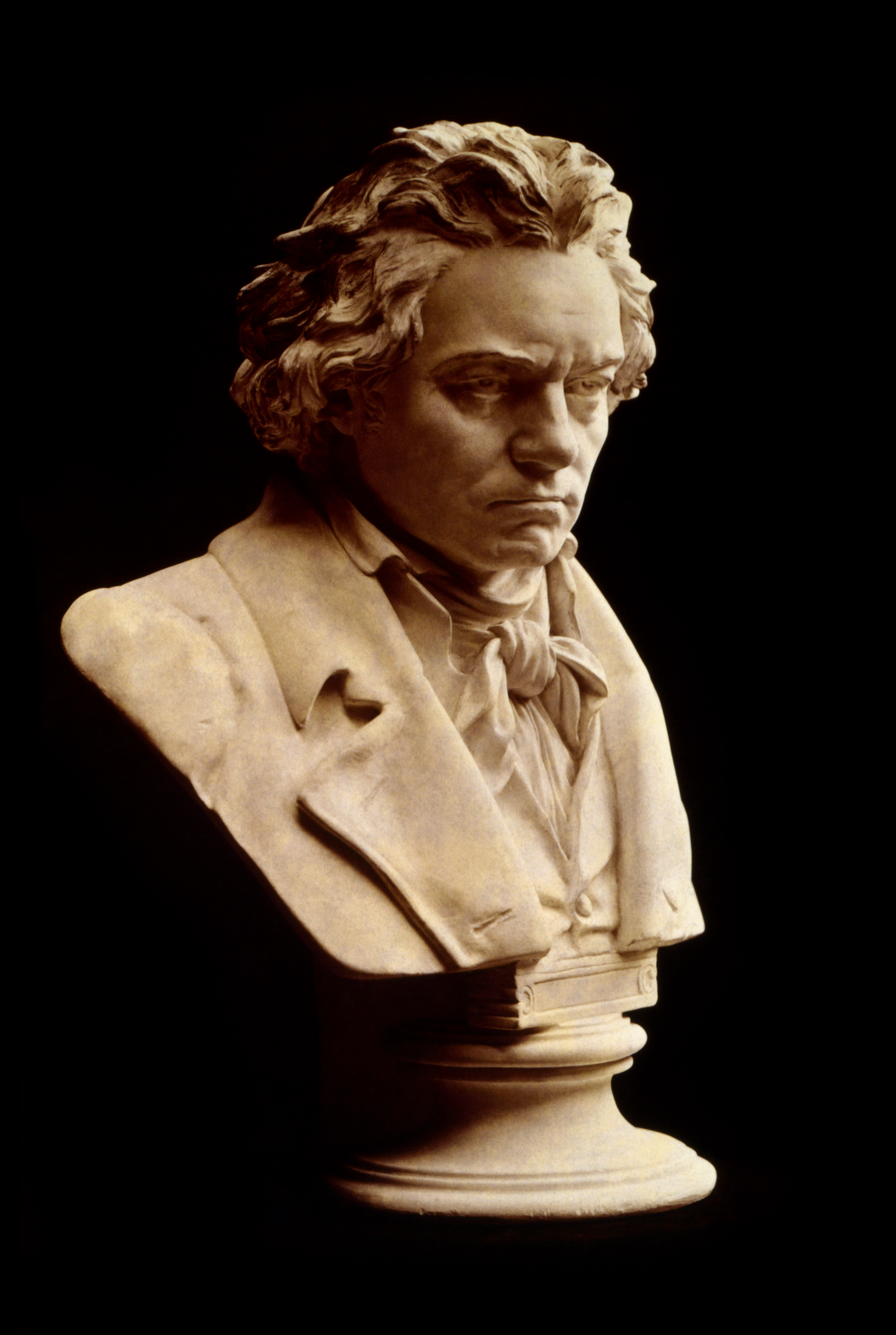
A bust of Beethoven, based on his 1812 life mask

The traditional 19th-century method of identifying a composer's works was for publishers to assign some sort of consecutive opus number to the works as they were published. This method is not entirely satisfactory to anyone. Musicians and the listening public have no reliable way to distinguish different works with similar characteristics. Musicologists cannot reliably identify unpublished works, nor do they have a reliable indication from the opus number of the actual composition date(s). For example, the Octet, written from 1792 to 1793 is Opus 103, while Opus 102 and Opus 104 were written in 1815 and 1817 respectively. Some opus numbers comprise multiple pieces; 172 works are divided among 138 opus numbers.

All of Beethoven's compositions up to and including Opus 135 were published in Beethoven's lifetime; later numbers were published posthumously, and are generally denoted by "Op. posth."

== Kinsky–Halm catalogue ==
In 1955, Georg Kinsky and Hans Halm published a catalogue of Beethoven's works, in which they assigned numbers to 205 "Werke ohne Opuszahl" (meaning "works without opus number" in German) to some of Beethoven's unpublished works. These numbers given these works are generally preceded by "WoO".

The Kinsky–Halm catalogue also lists 18 works in an appendix as being either doubtfully attributed, or simply spurious. These numbers are generally preceded by "Anh.", short for German Anhang, meaning appendix.

== Hess catalogue ==
The Swiss composer and musicologist Willy Hess also researched and published a catalogue in the 1950s, in which he included pieces not included in the 19th century complete edition published by Breitkopf and Härtel. Hess included many more fragmentary works than did Kinsky, and his catalog runs to 335 entries in the "Hauptkatalog" (main catalogue), and 66 "doubtful and falsely-attributed" works in an appendix. Many pieces have both WoO and H numbers. A good example would be the Twelve Dances for Orchestra (AKA German Dances) of 1792–1797, which are WoO 13 in the Kinsky catalogue, and H 5 in the Hess catalogue.

== Biamonti Catalogue ==
Beethoven's compositions are also organized through the Biamonti Catalogue, compiled by Giovanni Biamonti and published in 1968. This work is an attempt to chronologically order all of Beethoven's creative output, in a manner similar to the catalogues of Franz Schubert's works by Otto Erich Deutsch and of Wolfgang Amadeus Mozart's works by Ludwig Ritter von Köchel. It combines the pieces with opus numbers, all of the works from the Kinsky and Hess catalogues, and previously uncatalogued fragments, into a single list comprising 849 entries.

== Catalogues ==
The following references identify the major catalogues of Beethoven's works.

- Nottebohm, Gustav. Thematisches Verzeichnis der im Druck erschienenen Werke von Ludwig van Beethoven. Leipzig, Breitkopf & Härtel, 1925. OCLC 4763103. Reprinted Wiesbaden: M. Sändig, 1969 OCLC 1828776.
  —Historically important thematic catalogue, by a pioneering 19th Century Beethoven scholar.
  —Full title in English: Thematic Catalogue of the Published Works of Ludwig van Beethoven.
- Kinsky, G. and H. Halm. Das Werk Beethovens: thematisch-bibliographisches Verzeichnis seiner sämtlichen vollendeten Kompositionen. München: G. Henle, 1955. OCLC 334667
  —The standard thematic and bibliographical catalogue of Beethoven's works.
  —Full title in English: Beethoven's Works: thematic and bibliographic catalogue of all his completed compositions by Georg Kinsky, completed and edited after the author's death by Hans Halm.
- Hess, Willy. Verzeichnis der nicht in der Gesamtausgabe veröffentlichen Werke Ludwig van Beethovens. Wiesbaden: Breitkopf & Härtel, 1957. OCLC 18406510
  —Hess' original study and catalogue; still more widely available in libraries than Green's edition.
  —Full title in English: Catalogue of works not found in the Collected Works of Ludwig van Beethoven.
- Green, James (ed. and trans). The new Hess catalog of Beethoven’s works. West Newbury, Vermont: Vance Brook, 2003. ISBN 0-9640570-3-4 (also it. transl. James F. Green, Il nuovo catalogo Hess delle opere di Beethoven, translated by Cristoforo Prodan, Zecchini Editore, Varese, 2006)
  —An English translation of Willy Hess's important 1957 catalogue and study, updated to reflect more recent scholarship.
- Biamonti, Giovanni. Catalogo cronologico e tematico delle opere di Beethoven. Torino: ILTE, 1968. OCLC 2028666
  —Encompasses works with and without opus numbers, as well as sketches and fragments, in 849 chronologically arranged entries.
  —Full title in English: Chronological and Thematic Catalogue of the works of Beethoven.

== Sources ==
- Johnson, Douglas and Scott G. Burnham. "Beethoven, Ludwig Van (Works)", Grove Music Online Archived 2008-05-16 at the Wayback Machine ed. L. Macy (Subscription access). Accessed 2007-04-19.
  —Includes categorized works list with bibliographical and other information.
- Solomon, Maynard. Beethoven (1st edition). New York: Schirmer, 1977. ISBN 0-02-872460-7. pp. 372, 386–391.
  —Popular biographical study; includes bibliographical notes and (incomplete) works lists.
