= Leutwiler =

Leutwiler is a surname. Notable people with the surname include:

- Jayson Leutwiler (born 1989), Swiss-born Canadian soccer player
- Tom Leutwiler (1948–1993), American sailing photographer
- Toni Leutwiler (1923–2009), Swiss composer and violinist

== See also ==
- Leutwyler
