= Heinrich Schweizer =

Swiss composer (born 1943)

Heinrich Schweizer (born September 5, 1943) is a Swiss composer of classical music. Schweizer first rose to prominence with his Historical Symphony, completed in 1974, which was premiered by the American Symphony Orchestra conducted by David Gilbert at Avery Fisher Hall on May 14, 1979. Some of his other notable compositions include Sinfonietta, the Pentatonic and East West Symphony.

== See also ==
- List of Swiss composers
