= Leutwyler =

Leutwyler is a surname. Notable people with the surname include:

- Kim Leutwyler (fl. early 21st century), Australian artist
- Matthew Leutwyler (born 1969), American writer, director, and producer

== See also ==
- Leutwiler
