= Adrien Dollfus =

French carcinologist (1858–1921)

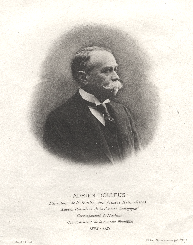

Adrien Frédéric Jules Dollfus (21 March 1858, in Mulhouse-Dornach – 19 November 1921, in Paris) was a French carcinologist known for his work with terrestrial isopods, including crustaceans and trilobites.

== Life and career ==
Adrien Dollfus was the grandson of Alsatian factory owner Jean Dollfus. He was born in Dornach, Alsace, now part of the city of Mulhouse, Haut-Rhin. He completed a Bachelor of Science degree and then began a lifelong study of crustaceans and trilobites. In 1870 he founded the publication La Feuille des jeunes naturalistes. In 1888 he married Anna Noémie Schlumberger in Paris, with whom he had three children.

In 1912 Dollfus was chosen president of the Société zoologique de France. Some species with the epithet of dollfusi are named in his honor, and others commemorate his relatives geologist Gustave Frédéric Dollfus (1850-1931) or parasitologist Robert-Philippe Dollfus (1887-1976).

Around 1900, Swiss author, editor, correspondent and librarian Hans Bloesch (1878-1945) served as Dollfus' private secretary and librarian.

== Selected works ==
- Isopodes terrestres du "Challenger", 1890 - Terrestrial isopods from the "Challenger expedition".
- Mission scientifique du Cap Horn 1882-1883. VI, Crustacés / Crustacés isopodes / A. Dollfus, (Alphonse Milne-Edwards) 1891 - Scientific mission to Cape Horn in 1882-83 (VI Crustaceans / Isopod crustaceans by Dollfus).
- Voyage de M. Ch. Alluaud dans le territoire d'Assinie (Afrique occidentale) en juillet et août 1886. (1892) - Voyage of Charles Alluaud to the territory of Assinie (western Africa) in July/August 1886.
- Catalogue raisonné des Isopodes terrestres de l'Espagne, 1892 - Catalogue raisonné of terrestrial isopods native to Spain.
- Sur la distribution géographique des isopodes terrestres dans la région des Basses-Pyrénées, 1893 - On the geographical distribution of terrestrial isopods in Basses-Pyrénées.
- Voyage de M. Charles Alluaud aux Iles Séchelles. Crustacés Isopodes terrestres, 1893 - Voyage of Alluaud to the Seychelles; terrestrial isopods.
- Voyage de M. Ch. Alluaud aux Iles Canaries (Nov. 1889-juin 1890) Isopodes terrestres, 1893 - Voyage of Alluaud to the Canary Islands; terrestrial isopods.
- Crustacés Isopodes de la Sicile, 1896 - Isopod crustaceans native to Sicily.
