= Hans Bloesch =

Swiss journalist and historian

Hans Bloesch (26 December 1878 – 28 April 1945) was a Swiss author, editor, correspondent and librarian.

== Life and career ==
Hans Bloesch was born in Bern, where his father was the head librarian in the Bern city library. He studied German, history and philosophy at the University of Bern and went to work around 1900 as a private secretary and librarian for Adrien Dollfus (1858–1921) in Paris. In 1902 he finished his doctorate in Bern. In 1905 he supervised the editorial staff of the Berner Fremdenblatt, and from 1906 to 1908 he taught at the German School in Rome. During this time, he also worked as a correspondent for a number of Swiss and German newspapers.

In 1909 he married violinist Adele Stöcker (1875–1978) and moved back to Bern where he worked as an editor. In 1919 he took the position of librarian for the city and the university. In 1927 he was elected to the position of head librarian, where he served until two months before he died in 1945.

== Works ==
Selected works include:

- Das Junge Deutschland in Seinen Beziehungen zu Frankreich
- Heinrich Wölflis Reise nach Jerusalem: 1520/1521
- Jeremias Gotthelf
- Die Bernische Musikgesellschaft 1815–1915
