= Fritz Brun =

Swiss conductor and composer

Fritz Brun (18 August 1878 – 29 November 1959) was a Swiss pianist, conductor and composer of classical music.

== Life ==
Brun was born in Lucerne. He was a student of Franz Wüllner at the conservatory at Cologne, and studied piano and theory there until 1902. The following year he became a piano teacher at the music school in Bern. From 1909 until 1941, he led the symphony concerts of the Bernischen Musikgesellschaft, and was conductor of the choral society and lieder group there. From 1926 to 1940, additionally, he was the vice-president of the Swiss music society Tonkünstlerverein. In June 1941 Brun retired, except for occasional returns to conducting. He dedicated his first violin sonata to violinist Adele Bloesch-Stöcker.

In 1912 Brun married Hanna Rosenmund; they had three children. Brun died in Grosshöchstetten.

== Compositions ==
Fritz Brun composed many works, his most popular being the 10 symphonies composed between 1901 and 1953, the symphonies have been considered as significant works in his country's musical life. From 2003 to 2015, these symphonies were collectively performed by the Moscow Symphony Orchestra and Bratislava Symphony Orchestra, conducted by the Swiss conductor Adriano and released in May 2019 by Brilliant Classics. The set consists of individual recordings by the Guild Music Label.

Beside the symphonies, Brun also composed 4 string quartets, a piano concerto, a cello concerto, many more including vocal works.

Brun's work has been considered and compared to the style of Brahms. This might be because Brun specialized in and admired the work of Brahms, especially as a conductor.

=== Symphonies ===
- No. 1 in B minor (1901) (premiered 1 June 1908 conducted by the composer)
- No. 2 in B♭ (1911) (premiered 14 February 1911 conducted by Volkmar Andreae)
- No. 3 in D minor (1919) (premiered 3 March 1920, conducted by the composer)
- No. 4 in E (1925) (premiered 2 February 1926 conducted by Volkmar Andreae))
- No. 5 in E♭ (1929) (Chaconne/Gehetzt, phantastisch/Langsam (slow)/Rasch und wütend) (premiered 14 January 1930 conducted by Volkmar Andreae)
- No. 6 in C (1932–1933) (premiered 29 October 1933 conducted by Hermann Scherchen)
- No. 7 in D (1937) (premiered 10 November 1937 conducted by Hermann Scherchen)
- No. 8 in A (1938–1942?) (premiered 11 November 1942 conducted by Hermann Scherchen))
- No. 9 in F (symphony/suite; five movements) (1949–50) (premiered 12 December 1960, conducted by Volkmar Andreae)
- No. 10 in B♭ (1953, premiered 7 November 1955 conducted by Luc Balmer)
- Symphonic Prologue in E♭ for Orchestra (3 December 1944)

=== Concertos ===
- Piano concerto in A major (1946)
- Cello Concerto in D minor (1947)

=== String Quartets ===
- No.1 in E♭ major (1898)
- No.2 in G major (1921)
- No.3 in F major (1943)
- No.4 in D major (1949)

=== Sonatas ===
- Piano and violin sonata in D minor (1906)
- Piano and violin sonata in D major (1951)
- Piano and cello sonata in F minor (1952)

=== Other works ===
- Piano Quintet in B♭ major (1902)
- Variations for piano and strings (premiered 13 October 1944)
- Overture to a Julibee Celebration in C major (May 1950)
- Orchestra Rhapsody (1958)
- 3 Lieder (Based on work by Othmar Schoeck)
- 5 Lieder
- "Aus dem Buch Hiob" (Translated: "From the book of Job") (1906)
- Divertimento for piano and strings (1954)

== Selected discography ==
- Fritz Brun. Complete Orchestral Works Brilliant Classics 957845; 11Cds 2003–2015, 1946 (CD11) originally released as individual recordings by the Guild Music label

== Sources ==
- "Guild Music Biography of Fritz Brun". 2012.
- "Fritz Brun Website".
