= Louise Witzig =

Swiss composer and folklorist

- Born: 1901; Winterthur, Switzerland
- Died: 1969 (aged 67–68); Winterthur, Switzerland
- Occupations: photographer folklorist

Louise Witzig (1901 – 9 January 1969) was a Swiss photographer, composer and folklorist, researcher of traditional costumes, folk dances and customs. She wrote booklets of Swiss folk dances, with accompanying music, and wrote and arranged dance tunes. Witzig was a member of the executive board of the International Folk Music Council.

== Life ==
Louise Witzig was born in 1901. Her father was a lawyer in Winterthur, and her mother came from the Neuchâtel Jura. Witzig was educated at the Cantonal School in Winterthur, where she was a student of Professor Rudolf Hunziker, followed by the Ecole Sociale in Geneva. She spent a year at a school in Lugano, where she learned Italian, and then stayed in England for a period, before working as an intern at her father's law firm.

In 1932 she became manager of the Swiss Traditional Costume Association, having taken up an interest in sewing and wearing traditional costume, and making and sewing dolls in costume.

Witzig was a folk dance teacher. She gathered together Swiss folk costumers and singers in the summer of 1932 for a week of traditional activities, which became an annual event, taught by Alfred Stern, Louise Witzig, and Inge Baer-Grau. She published a booklet with dance descriptions, including steps, figures and forty dance pieces, in 1941.

Witzig was instrumental in the establishment of the Week of Swiss Folk Song. She composed dance scores and arranged folk dance music. Witzig conducted research and surveyed folk dances in Switzerland. In 1935 she presented a paper on Swiss folk dances at the International Folk Dance Conference held at Cecil Sharp House in London.

She was a member of the executive board of the International Folk Music Council (1947). As her mother became elderly, Witzig gave up her work to care for her, although she continued to edit the magazine Heimatleben.

Witzig died on 9 January 1969. She was survived by her mother.

== Publications ==
- "The Swiss Folk Dance and its Place in the Revival of Rural Life and Customs" (1935)
- 12 Schweizer Tänze. Schweizerische Tanzweisen mit Tanzanweisungen. Zürich [1939] (in collaboration with Alfred und Klara Stern and Ingeborg Grau).
- Volkstänze der Schweiz. Heft 1.' Grundschritte – Paartänze – 12 Tanzweisen. Zürich [1952], 2. Auflage (in collaboration with Alfred Stern).
- Volkstänze der Schweiz. Heft 2: Volkstänze der alemannischen Schweiz. Zürich [1950].
- Schweizer Trachtenbuch mit 60 Farbtafeln und 200 Schwarzweiss-Abbildungen, [1954], in the German language, 279 pages.
