= Adele Bloesch-Stöcker =

Swiss-German violinist and composer (1875–1978)

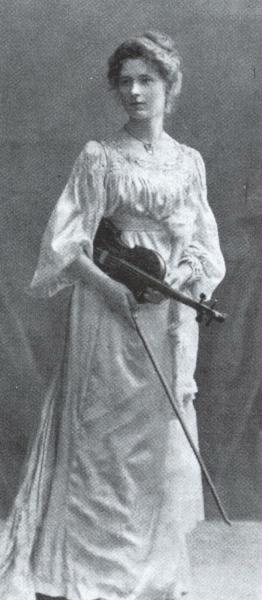
Adele Bloesch-Stöcker

Adele Bloesch-Stöcker (12 June 1875 – 10 September 1978) was a Swiss-German violinist and composer. She was born in Gummersbach, Germany, and was associated with Fritz Brun and Othmar Schoeck.

She performed in Cologne, Berlin, Leipzig and Bern and was a founding member of the Bern Chamber Orchestra. In 1909 she married Swiss author Hans Bloesch (1878–1945).

She was responsible for the musical aspects of the Schweizeische Ausstellung für Frauenarbeit (SAFFA) in 1928, for which she composed a SAFFA walz and directed the women orchestra.

After giving up her performing career for health reasons, Bloesch-Stöcker turned to composition. She released her Concerto for Violin and Orchestra in E minor in 1935, and conducted performances in 1935–36 in Bern and Burgdorf. In 1973, she published an article, Erinnerungen an Max Reger (Memories of Max Reger) about the composer. She died in Winterthur.
