= Marcel Sulzberger =

Swiss composer and pianist

Johann Heinrich Samuel "Marcel" Sulzberger (24 December 1876–1941) was a Swiss composer, pianist, and music author.

== Life ==
There are few certain dates concerning his life, since Sulzberger himself contributed to keeping some facts unclear (for example, his birth year).

Sulzberger was born in Frankfurt of Swiss parents in 1876, the youngest of five children. In 1900 he studied at the university and conservatory in Zürich, where he was in contact with Othmar Schoeck and Gabriel Fauré. He was recommended to pursue further studies in Paris with Charles Marie Widor and went there in 1906. He returned to Zürich in 1911. Sulzberger was a close friend and great admirer of Ferruccio Busoni, who had emigrated to Switzerland during the World War I. It also seems certain that in 1917 Sulzberger participated – apparently without result – in an event at the Dada gallery in Zürich, in which Hugo Ball and Tristan Tzara among others participated.

== Works ==
During his studies, the young francophile Sulzberger was influenced by Claude Debussy's music. He was one of the first Swiss composers who experimented with bitonal and tritonal music, rather than a single tonality. Others also see an echo of Fauré and the style of the Second Viennese School in his music. Sulzberger's compositions were never well regarded by the Swiss critics of the time, since his style of composition was much before its time.

- Lieder für Gesang und Klavier, from there "An die Entfernte"
- Chanson d'été
- Cortège et fête für Klavier (lost)
- Sonate für Violine und Klavier (1919), premiere in Paris (1924)

== Leavings ==
- In the Central Library of Zürich, letters from e.g. Hugo Ball, Busoni, Debussy, Ernst von Dohnányi, Joseph Szigeti, Richard Strauss and Felix Weingartner that were left behind by Sulzberger are located.
