= Olga Diener =

Swiss composer, musician, and poet (1890–1963)

- Born: 1890; St. Gallen, Switzerland
- Died: 1963 (aged 72–73)
- Occupations: composer, musician, and poet

Olga Diener (1890–1963) was a Swiss composer, musician, and poet.

== Biography ==
Diener was born in St. Gallen in 1890. She studied violin and composition in St. Gallen, before continuing her studies in London, Basel, and Paris. Diener's poetry was first published in 1925 as part of a collection of contemporary lyric poetry by Swiss women. She continued to published poetry into the 1930s. Fellow poet Hans Reinhart praised her work as "some of the best we have to offer". Diener was also a friend of Herman Hesse, though he was reluctant to openly praise her work. Between 1933 and 1943, Diener lived and worked in Altnau. According to her grand-nephew, Philippe Diener, she may have moved to Altnau to seek a more calm environment. There she lived in a house named "Belrapeire" (a reference to Parzival), where she gave private concerts, including performances of her own compositions. Diener composed a total of 76 works, primarily chamber music. This included many piano pieces, Lieder, sonatas, string trios and quartets, piano concertos, and music for plays. However, during her lifetime, there were only two public performances of Diener's compositions. In 1929, her string trio op. 12 was performed in the small hall (German: Kleinen Saal) of the Tonhalle St. Gallen, to mixed reviews. In 1943, the St. Gallen String Quartet (St. Galler Streichquartett) performed Diener's string quartet op. 31 at the Hotel Hecht in St Gallen, as part of a chamber music evening of the International Society for Contemporary Music, to positive reviews. As of 2025, most of Diener's music has never been performed, not even in her own private concerts. Diener died in St. Gallen in 1963. Her papers are held in the Swiss Literary Archives, where they fill 23 boxes over two-and-a-half meters of shelf space. Her house in Altnau was later demolished and replaced. A biography of Diener by Ursula Riklin was published in 2003. That same year, three of her pieces were premiered by Kornelia Bruggmann and Dominik Blum. As of 2025, Diener is the subject of an archival research project comprising Philippe Diener, pianist Simone Keller, and producer and composer Ramon Bischoff. The project aims to get Diener's music published by a major music publisher.
