= Georg Kinsky =

German musicologist (1882–1951)

Georg Ludwig Kinsky (September 29, 1882, in Marienwerder, West Prussia – April 7, 1951, in Berlin) was a German musicologist.

== Biography ==
Kinsky began his career as an antiquarian books dealer, becoming the assistant of Albert Kopfermann at the Berlin State Library in 1908. He gained his PhD in 1925 in Cologne, writing his thesis about wind instruments. He became Privatdozent of musicology at the University of Cologne, teaching from 1921 to 1932, and curator of the Wilheim Heyer Museum of Music History. Kinsky was an acknowledged specialist of musical instruments and their history and had written the 1910-1916 catalogue of the museum.

Being the son of a Jewish businessman, Kinsky was persecuted by the Nazis, which lead to the forced termination of his career as an academic, and the forced possession of his private library and collection. Kinsky then served a year in a labour camp until 1945, with the Allied Victory of World War Two. Kinsky spent the rest of his life from 1945 onwards compiling Das Werk Beethovens, a thematic index of all of the works of Ludwig van Beethoven. Although Kinsky died before finishing the work, the unfinished volume was purchased by the Bavarian State Library, and was eventually completed by musicologist Hans Halm.

Contrary to reports at the time, Kinsky's academic library was not destroyed, and instead came into the possession of the Bouvier bookshop in Cologne. Music publisher Peter J. Tonger later purchased the library for 35,000 Reichmarks, with the intention of making it available to Kinsky. However, this was on the basis that Kinsky move from Cologne to Berlin, which he refused to do. After Kinsky's death in 1951, the library has remained in private ownership.

== Bibliography ==
- Georg Kinsky: Versteigerung von Musiker-Autographen aus dem Nachlaß des Herrn Kommerzienrates Wilhelm Heyer in Köln im Geschäftslokal der Firma Karl Ernst Henrici, Berlin, Montag, den 6. und Dienstag, den 7. Dezember 1926 ... durch Karl Ernst Henrici & Leo Liepmannssohn, Antiquariat, Berlin, Berlin 1926.
- Georg Kinsky: Versteigerung von Musikerbildnissen sowie Darstellungen mit Musikinstrumenten aus dem Nachlaß des Herrn Kommerzienrates Wilhelm Heyer in Köln durch Karl Ernst Henrici & Leo Liepmannssohn, Antiquariat, Berlin, Berlin 1927.
- Georg Kinsky: Versteigerung von Musiker-Autographen aus dem Nachlaß des Herrn Kommerzienrates Wilhelm Heyer in Köln. Teil 2: Versteigerung von Musikbüchern, praktischer Musik und Musiker-Autographen des 16. bis 18. Jahrhunderts aus dem Nachlaß des Herrn Kommerzienrates Wilhelm Heyer in Köln durch Karl Ernst Henrici & Leo Liepmannssohn, Antiquariat, Berlin, Berlin 1928.
- Georg Kinsky/Hans Halm: Das Werk Beethovens :Thematisch-Bibliographisches Verzeichnis aller vollendeten Werke Ludwig van Beethovens, G. Henle Verlag, Munich 1955.

== Literature ==
- Kinsky, Georg, in: Joseph Walk (Hrsg.): Kurzbiographien zur Geschichte der Juden 1918–1945. München : Saur, 1988, ISBN 3-598-10477-4, S. 193
