= WoO =

Catalogue of Beethoven compositions without an opus number

Werke ohne Opuszahl ("Works without opus number") (WoO), also Kinsky–Halm Catalogue, is a German musical catalogue prepared in 1955 by Georg Kinsky and Hans Halm, usually listing all of the compositions of Ludwig van Beethoven that were not originally published with an opus number, or survived only as fragments. The work was originally titled in German Das Werk Beethovens: Thematisch-bibliographisches Verzeichnis seiner sämtlichen vollendeten Kompositionen.

The abbreviation WoO is also used sometimes to refer to works without opus by other composers, such as Johannes Brahms, Robert Schumann, Muzio Clementi, Alexander Scriabin, Louis Spohr, Joachim Raff, or Ferdinand Ries.

== See also ==
- Catalogues of Beethoven compositions
- List of compositions by Ludwig van Beethoven
