= Robert Hermann (composer) =

Swiss composer (1869–1912)

Robert Hermann (1869–1912) was a Swiss composer, born at Bern. He studied music at the Frankfurt Conservatory in 1891, and with Engelbert Humperdinck (1893–94). In 1895 the Berlin Philharmonic premiered his Symphony in C, and much of his further career was spent in Germany. His works include pieces for violin and piano, songs, a concert overture in D minor, a piano quartet, a piano trio, a violin sonata, etc.

In 2009 Sterling Records released a recording of Hermann's 2 symphonies conducted by Christopher Fifield.
