= Marie-Anne Calame =

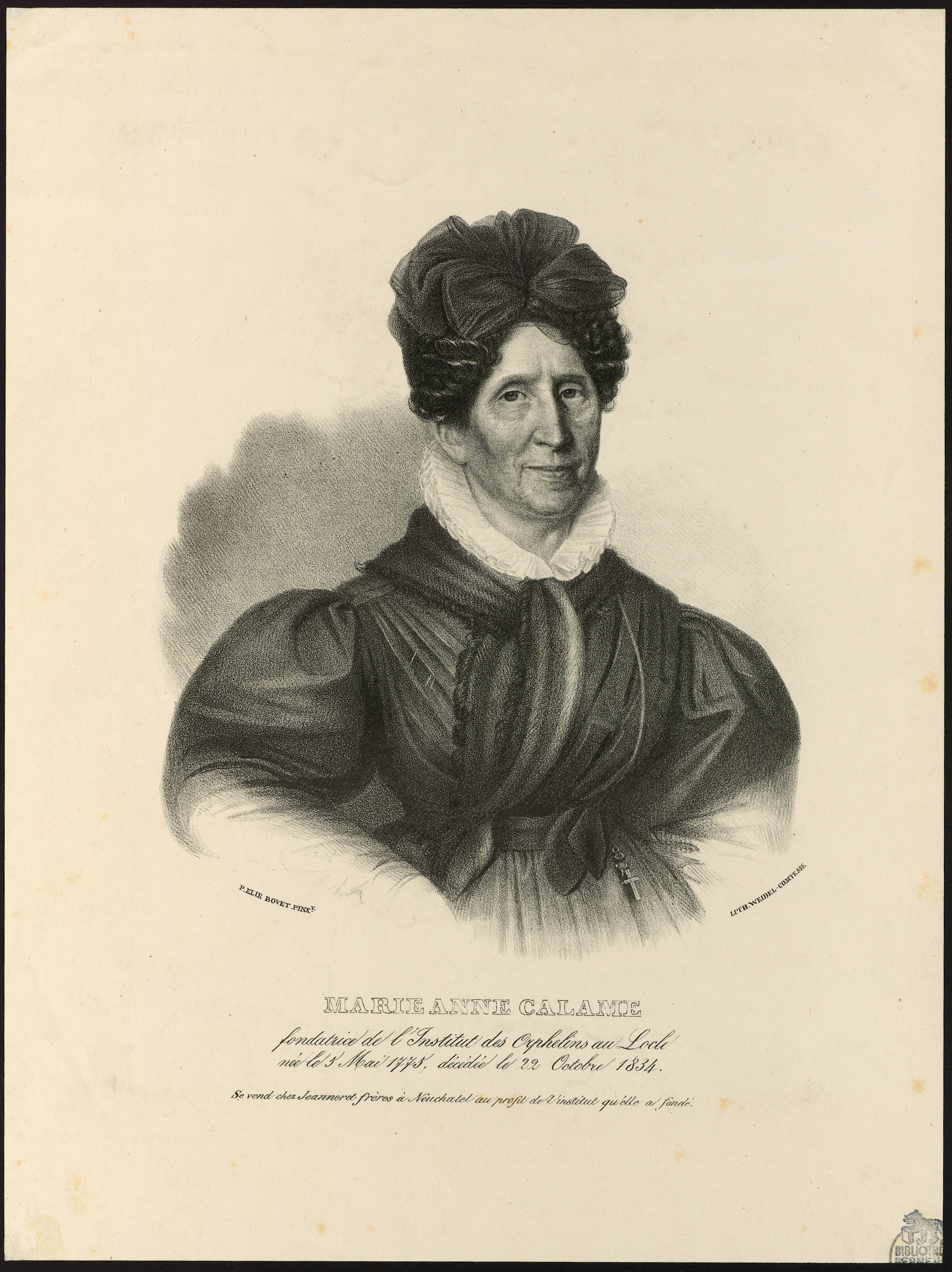
Marie-Anne Calame

Marie-Anne Calame (5 May 1775 - 12 October 1834 or 22 October 1834), was a Swiss Vitreous enamel miniaturist and a pietist philanthropist educator. She founded the Asile des Billodes, a famous charity school for orphans and other children in need of help.

== Biography ==
Marie-Anne Calame was the daughter of Jean-Jacques-Henri Calame and Marie-Anne Houriet. His father taught her how to do enamel painting and ivory sculpting.

On 1 March 1815, with a group of friends, Marie-Anne Calame founded the Asile des enfants malheureux to help young and disadvantaged girls from 2 to 20 years old. She had grown tired of seeing abandoned children wander the streets of her town and begging for food. The Asile opened with 6 young girls. In 1819 (or 1820), the Asile opened to boys as well. She taught the young girls to sew, to knit, and produced lace that was sold abroad and financed Calame's foster home. In the afternoon, the kids were taught reading and writing, maths, arts, geography... Advanced and "retarded" students are assigned specific classes adapted to their level. The kids were also trained to make watches, an activity that also helped financing the foster home. Calame's "school" soon outperformed the local communal schools. Workshops were installed within the center to train children to craftsmanship.

In 1816, 16 children "studied" at the asile, 150 in 1827. In 1826, a legs donated to the asile enabled the expansion of the center. Marie-Anne Calame never refused a child's admission in the asile Upon her death in 1834, the Asile had 320 pupils. The Asile des Billodes pioneered the idea that anyone regardless of social stature could be taught effectively, and that young children need a custom education system (Kindergarten).

In 1934, Arthur Piaget, father of Jean Piaget, wrote about Marie-Anne Calame : « Thanks to Marie-Anne Calame, the hearts of the locals of Neuchâtel were miraculously aflame. » There is a street named after her, Rue Marie-Anne-Calame, in Le Locle, Switzerland.

== Bibliography ==
- Renate Gyalog: Die „Pestalozzi“ von Le Locle : das Leben der Marie-Anne Calame, Zürich 1996, ISBN 3-545-34138-0.
