= Toni Leutwiler =

Swiss composer and violinist (1923–2009)

- Born: 31 October 1923; Zurich, Switzerland
- Died: 8 March 2009 (aged 85)
- Other name: Tom Wyler
- Occupations: Composer; arranger; violinist
- Years active: 1945–1975
- Style: Light music

Toni Leutwiler (31 October 1923 – 8 March 2009), also known as Tom Wyler, was a Swiss composer and violinist from Zurich, Switzerland, who specialized in light music.

== Biography ==
Leutwiler attended the conservatory in Zurich from 1936 to 1944 and received his teaching diploma in violin and piano at the age of 19.

He had great international success as a composer and as an arranger for soloists and orchestras. He was at the peak of his professional career in the 1960s. Between 1945 and 1975, he composed and arranged around 2,000 compositions and arrangements, especially for symphonic light music, inspired also by jazz, which had brought the American occupation troops to Europe at that time.

== Music ==
Leutwiler's music carries the distinctive style of music that was typical of other mid-century composers like Leroy Anderson. Much of it is also marked by virtuosity in the violin parts. These instances of virtuoso passages are very apparent in his compositions Bristol Cream, Happy Time and Galop on Strings. A typical piece by him follows the A–B–A format, with two fast sections at the outer parts of the piece that are almost identical to each other and a slow, lyrical theme in the middle. The slow themes contrast very much with its passionate lyricism to the light and frivolous faster sections. The Water Skiing movement from his Summer Suite displays this very clearly.

Leutwiler's background as a violinist is noticeable in his works. The violin parts take most of the melody while the rest of the orchestra accompanies that section.
