= Geneviève Calame =

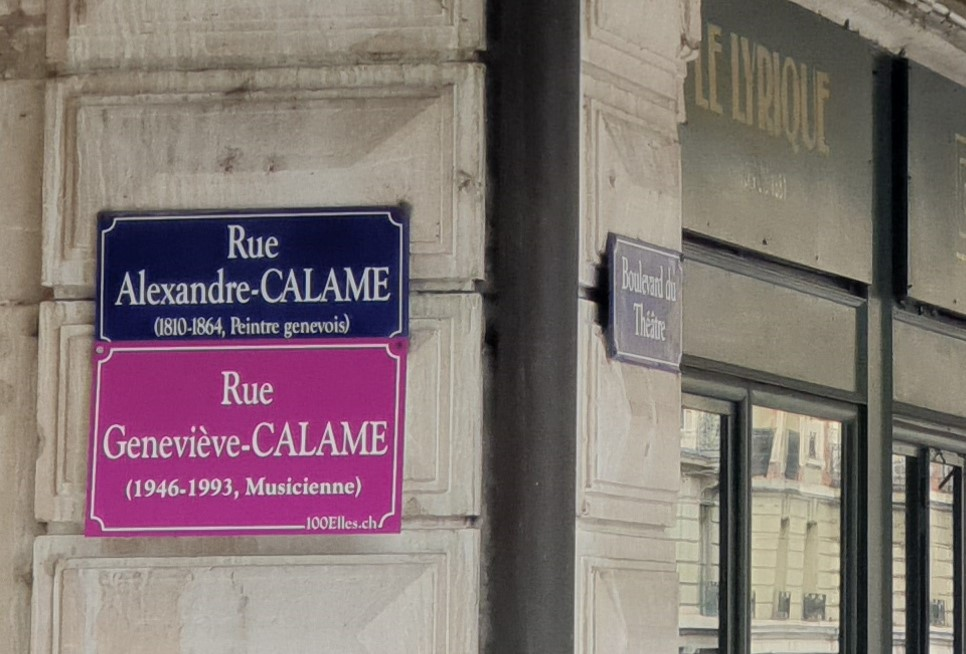
100elles-20190525-Rue Geneviève CALAME-Rue Alexandre CALAME

Geneviève Calame (30 December 1946 – 8 October 1993) was a Swiss pianist, music educator and composer.

== Life ==
Geneviève Calame was born in Geneva of Greco-Italian ancestry, and studied the piano in Geneva with Lottie Morel and then in Rome with Guido Agosti. She continued her education in Geneva with Louis Hiltbrand and Jacques Guyonnet. She took further courses in composition in London with Pierre Boulez, in Liège with Henri Pousseur and in Paris with Jean-Claude Eloy. She appeared as a piano soloist many times in the Studio de Musique Contenporaine from 1972 to 1983. She studied electronic and electro-acoustic technology in New York City with Hubert Howe and visual artist Bill Etra.

After completing her education, Geneviève Calame worked as a composer through contemporary music studios in Geneva. In 1971 she and Jacques Guyonnet founded a studio for electronic music, video and information technology under the name A.R.T (Artistic Research Team), and she began to produce audio visual installations, among other works. In 1972 Calame married Jacques Guyonnet and had two children.

Geneviève Calame developed a method for teaching electronic music to children and taught from 1975–1993 at the Geneva's Board of Education and in l'Ecole Supérieure d'Art Visuel in Geneva. In 1976 she served as president of the Geneva section of the International Society of Contemporary Music. She was a leader in Video Art, producing more than hundred paintings from video still frames. This work was presented in Cannes at the MIP TV and many places around the world, A.R.T. Studios Geneva, Museum of fine ARTS in Lausanne with René Berger, Rio de Janeiro at cecilia Meireles and the Serpentine Gallery in London among others. She died in Geneva in 1993.

== Works ==
Calame composes for orchestra, chamber ensemble, voice, ballet, electronic, multimedia performance. Selected works include:

- L'Oiseau du matin (1972), electronic ballet
- Mantiq-al-Tayr (1973) for flute, contrabass flute and four electronic sources
- Différentielle verticale (1974) for soprano and symphonic orchestra
- Lude (1975) for harp alone
- Iral (1975) for four trumpets and four trombones
- Geometry I, II, III (1975–1976) Videotape
- Le chant remémoré (1975) Videotape
- Alpha futur (1976) for symphonic orchestra and soprano
- Labyrinthes Fluides (1976) Videotape
- Tableaux video (1976–1977)
- Videocosme (1976) for the electronic poem by Edgar Varèse, Videotape
- StEpHAnE mAllArmE (1977) or Un coup de dés jamais n'abolira le hasard... for chamber orchestra
- Et l'Oeil rêve... (1977) Visual poem
- Les Aubes d'Onomadore (1978) for African instruments and symphonic orchestra
- Le Son-Qui-Fut-Mille (1978) for four electronic sources and percussion instruments
- Mandala (1978) for seven trumpets or seven female voices
- L'Homme-Miroir (1979) for wind orchestra, percussion and four electronic sources
- Je lui dis... (1980) for chamber orchestra
- Oniria (1981) for piano solo and electronic tape
- Calligrammes (1983–1984) for harp and chamber orchestra
- Océanides (1986) for chamber orchestra
- Swing (1986) for piano
- Sur la margelle du monde (1987) for chamber orchestra
- Le Livre de Tchen (1988) for three percussionists and mime
- Vent solaire (1989–1990) for shakuhachi and orchestra
- Incantation (1989) for organ
- Cantilène (1990) for violin alone
- Dragon de lumière (1991) for three wind instruments and five strings
- Le chant des sables (1992) for violoncello, harp and gongs
- Echo (1992) for flute
- Hi Summer (1993) for voice, harp, percussion and synthesiser
