= Beethoven Gesamtausgabe =

First collected edition of the composer's works

The Ludwig van Beethovens Werke: vollständige kritisch durchgesehene überall berechtigte Ausgabe, also known as the Beethoven Gesamtausgabe, was the first collected edition of the works of Ludwig van Beethoven published 1862–1865. Its full title means Ludwig van Beethoven's Works: complete, critical, thoroughly revised, authorized edition). Although this was the first collected edition to be finished, there was at least one previous attempt at a complete edition by Tobias Haslinger between 1828 and 1842.

== Description ==
The Ludwig van Beethovens Werke: vollständige kritisch durchgesehene überall berechtigte Ausgabe (which roughly translated means Ludwig van Beethoven's Works: complete, critical, thoroughly revised, authorized edition) was the first collected edition of the works of Beethoven. It was published between 1862 and 1865, with a supplementary volume appearing in 1888.

The edition contained 263 works arranged in twenty four "series". While a groundbreaking achievement, its limitations soon became apparent. Musicologist Friedrich Spiro delivered a paper to the Fourth Congress of the International Music Society in 1911 that advocated a revision of the Gesamtausgabe. Spiro pointed out both numerous inaccuracies in its musical text and various authentic works of Beethoven that were never included (such as Op. 134, Beethoven's own piano duet arrangement of his Große Fuge, Op. 133).

In 1957 Willy Hess published a catalogue of authentic works of Beethoven not included in the Gesamtausgabe.

In providing annotation for the celebrated recording of Beethoven's piano concertos by Steven Lubin and Christopher Hogwood, Prof. Robert S. Winter noted that the parts available for the concertos at the time of the recording (1987) were the same ones available when the Gesamtausgabe was completed. He points out both that the original sources which have come down to us of the concertos can be ambiguous, and that even in instances where they were not, "the anonymous editors of the concertos [in the Gesamtausgabe] dressed them in 1860s garb—a wholly understandable response. In other instances they simply misconstrued the sources". Part of this, Winter suggests, can be attributed to the fact that the piano changed significantly between Beethoven's time and the time when the Gesamtausgabe appeared. (A similar phenomenon is observable when one compares the piano concertos of Mozart as originally written by the composer and the versions of the Alte Mozart-Ausgabe published in the 1870s; the latter have numerous changes, particularly in matters of phrasing.)

A new complete edition of Beethoven's music began publication in 1961, initiated by the Beethoven-Haus in Bonn. However, the work on this was reported in 1991 by Nicholas Marston to be proceeding slowly. According to their website, 56 volumes are projected of which 43 have now been published.

== See also ==
- List of compositions by Ludwig van Beethoven

== Sources ==
- Nicholas Marston, "Beethoven Literature: Editions of the Music," in Barry Cooper, ed., The Beethoven Compendium (Ann Arbor, MI: Borders Press, 1991). ISBN 0-681-07558-9. pp. 314–6.
- Robert S. Winter, "Beethoven and the Piano Concertos," liner notes to Ludwig van Beethoven: The Five Piano Concertos as performed by Steven Lubin, piano, and the Academy of Ancient Music directed by Christopher Hogwood, L'Oiseau Lyre 421 408-2, released in 1988.
