= Willy Hess (composer) =

Swiss musician (1906–1997)

Willy Hess (12 October 1906 – 9 May 1997) was a Swiss musicologist, composer, and famous Beethoven scholar. He achieved fame after compiling and publishing a catalogue of works of Beethoven that were not listed in the "complete" edition. He orchestrated the Piano Concerto No. 0, in E-flat from a piano score.

== Life ==
Hess was born in Winterthur, where he attended primary and high school, and later studied at the Zurich Conservatory (merged in 1999 into the School of Music, Drama, and Dance (HMT), itself merged in 2007 into the Zurich University of the Arts (ZHdK)) and at the University. He also taught piano, counterpoint, and composition, and wrote about music.

Among other works, he wrote 3 Ländler, Op. 28 for a 4-hand piano duet. He also wrote a Sonata for Viola and Bassoon, the only classical-style chamber work written for that combination of instruments.

He also was a bassoonist with the Winterthur Stadtorchester from 1942 to 1971.

He died in Winterthur.

== Bibliography ==
- James F. Green: The New Hess Catalog of Beethoven's Works (Vance Brook Publishing, 2003), ISBN 978-0-9640570-3-6

== See also ==
- Vestas Feuer — A Beethoven operatic fragment first completed and published by Hess.
- List of compositions by Ludwig van Beethoven
