= Dusík =

Dusík (feminine: Dusíková) is a Czech surname. Dussek is a Germanised form of the surname, which appeared in the name of Jan Ladislav Dussek and his family. Notable people with the surname include:

- František Josef Dusík (1765 – after 1816), composer and instrumentalist
- Jan Dusík (born 1975), Czech activist and politician
- Jan Ladislav Dussek, born Jan Václav Dusík (1760–1812), Czech composer and pianist
- Kateřina Veronika Anna Dusíková, also known as Veronika Dussek (1769–1833), Czech composer and pianist
- Olivia Buckley, also known as Olivia Dussek (1799–1847), English composer and harpist
- Sophia Dussek (1775 – c. 1831), Scottish composer, soprano and harpist

== See also ==
- Dussek Campbell Ltd, formerly Dussek Brothers, British chemical company
- Dušek, similar Czech surname
