= List of compositions by Jan Ladislav Dussek =

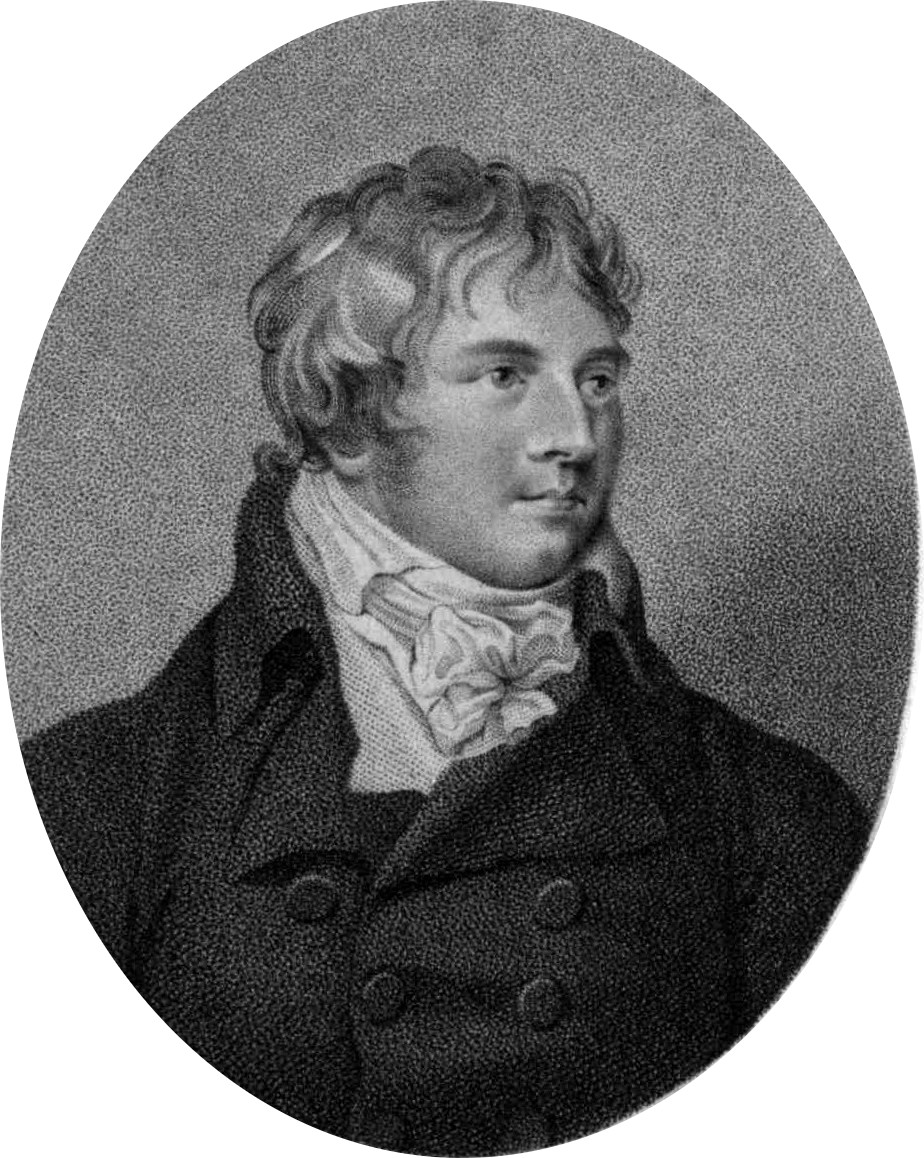
Engraved portrait of Dussek, published in 1867

This is a list of compositions by Jan Ladislav Dussek.

Cataloging Dussek's compositions has a history of its own. Dussek's oeuvre has historically been difficult to organize, due in part to the number of publishers who originally published his work, and to the fact that some of his works were published by more than one publisher. Some works published by different publishers were assigned different opus numbers; sometimes different works were given the same opus number by different publishers. Dussek further complicated this by arranging works for different instrument combinations.

The Artaria Company published a thematic catalog of his works that is incomplete, prompting Howard Craw to develop a new thematic catalog in 1964. Works are numbered in the order they were written prefixed by "C" or "Craw"; works of dubious origin are listed in a separately numbered section prefixed by "Craw D".

== Works ==
- Craw 1. Keyboard Concerto in B♭ major (apparently lost)
- Craw 2. Keyboard Concerto Op. 1 No. 1 in C major
- Craw 3. Keyboard Concerto Op. 1 No. 2 in E♭ major
- Craw 4. Keyboard Concerto Op. 1 No. 3 in G major
- Craw 5. Sonata for keyboard & violin Op. 1 No. 1 in B♭ major (No. 32)
- Craw 6. Sonata for keyboard & violin Op. 1 No. 2 in G major (No. 33)
- Craw 7. Sonata for keyboard & violin Op. 1 No. 3 in C major (No. 34)
- Craw 8. Overture to Le droit d'ainesse for keyboard in D major
- Craw 9. Overture to Zémire et Azor for keyboard in D major
- Craw 10. "General Suwarrow's March" arranged for piano in E♭ major
- Craw 11. Piano Trio Op. 1 (1786) No. 1 (lost)
- Craw 12. Piano Trio Op. 1 (1786) No. 2 (lost)
- Craw 13. Piano Trio Op. 1 (1786) No. 3 (lost)
- Craw 14. Sonata for keyboard & violin Op. 2 No. 1 in C major (No. 35)
- Craw 15. Sonata for keyboard & violin Op. 2 No. 2 in F major (No. 36)
- Craw 16. Sonata for keyboard & violin Op. 2 No. 3 in C minor (No. 37)
- Craw 17. Sonata for keyboard & violin Op. 46 No. 1 in C major
- Craw 18. Sonata for keyboard & violin Op. 46 No. 2 in F major
- Craw 19. Sonata for keyboard & violin Op. 46 No. 3 in B♭ major
- Craw 20. Sonata for keyboard & violin Op. 46 No. 4 in C major
- Craw 21. Sonata for keyboard & violin Op. 46 No. 5 in D major
- Craw 22. Sonata for keyboard & violin Op. 46 No. 6 in G major
- Craw 23. Sonata for piano & flute Op. 51 No. 1 in G major (No. 45)
- Craw 24. Sonata for piano & flute Op. 51 No. 2 in D major (No. 46)
- Craw 25. Sonata for piano & flute Op. 51 No. 3 in C major (No. 47)
- Craw 26. Easter Cantata in C major
- Craw 27. Sonata for piano & violin Op. 1 No. 1 in C major (No. 38)
- Craw 28. Sonata for piano & violin Op. 1 No. 2 in B♭ major (No. 39)
- Craw 29. Sonata for piano & violin Op. 1 No. 3 in F major (No. 40)
- Craw 30. Piano Trio Op. 2 No. 1 in C major
- Craw 31. Piano Trio Op. 2 No. 2 in B♭ major
- Craw 32. Piano Trio Op. 2 No. 3 in E minor
- Craw 33. Keyboard Concerto Op. 3 in E♭ major
- Craw 34. Piano Trio Op. 1 (1787) No. 1 (lost)
- Craw 35. Piano Trio Op. 1 (1787) No. 2 (lost)
- Craw 36. Piano Trio Op. 1 (1787) No. 3 (lost)
- Craw 37. Sonata for piano & violin Op. 4 No. 1 in F major (No. 41)
- Craw 38. Sonata for piano & violin Op. 4 No. 2 in E♭ major (No. 42)
- Craw 39. Sonata for piano & violin Op. 4 No. 3 in F minor (No. 30)
- Craw 40. Piano Sonatina in G major Op. 20 No. 1
- Craw 41. Sonata for keyboard & violin Op. 5 No. 1 in G major (No. 43)
- Craw 42. Sonata for keyboard & violin Op. 5 No. 2 in B♭ major (No. 44)
- Craw 43. Keyboard Sonata Op. 5 No. 3 in A♭ major (No. 29)
- Craw 44. Petit air connu varié for keyboard Op. 6 No. 1 in E♭ major
- Craw 45. Petit air connu varié for keyboard Op. 6 No. 2 in F major
- Craw 46. Petit air connu varié for keyboard Op. 6 No. 3 in A major
- Craw 47. Petit air connu varié for keyboard Op. 6 No. 4 in D minor
- Craw 48. Petit air connu varié for keyboard Op. 6 No. 5 in G minor
- Craw 49. Petit air connu varié for keyboard Op. 6 No. 6 in G minor
- Craw 50. Sonata for keyboard & flute Op. 7 No. 1 in C major (No. 48)
- Craw 51. Sonata for keyboard & flute Op. 7 No. 2 in G major (No. 49)
- Craw 52. Sonata for keyboard & flute Op. 7 No. 3 in E♭ major (No. 50)
- Craw 53. Harp Concerto Op. 15 in E♭ major
- Craw 54a. Sonata for keyboard & violin Op. 8 No. 1 in C major (No. 51)
- Craw 54b. Piano Trio Op. 20 No. 1 in C major
- Craw 55a. Sonata for keyboard & violin Op. 8 No. 2 in F major (No. 52)
- Craw 55b. Piano Trio Op. 20 No. 3 in F major
- Craw 56a. Sonata for keyboard & violin Op. 8 No. 3 in A major (No. 53)
- Craw 56b. Piano Trio Op. 20 No. 2 in A major
- Craw 57. Sonata for keyboard & violin Op. 9 No. 1 in B♭ major (No. 1)
- Craw 58. Sonata for keyboard & violin Op. 9 No. 2 in C major (No. 2)
- Craw 59. Sonata for keyboard & violin Op. 9 No. 3 in D major (No. 3)
- Craw 60. Sonata for keyboard & violin Op. 10 No. 1 in A major (No. 4)
- Craw 61. Sonata for keyboard & violin Op. 10 No. 2 in G minor (No. 5)
- Craw 62. Sonata for keyboard & violin Op. 10 No. 3 in E major (No. 6)
- Craw 63. Duet for harp & piano Op. 11 in F major
- Craw 64. Sonata for keyboard & violin Op. 12 No. 1 in F major (No. 54)
- Craw 65. Sonata for keyboard & violin Op. 12 No. 2 in B♭ major (No. 55)
- Craw 66. Sonata for keyboard & violin Op. 12 No. 3 in C major (No. 56)
- Craw 67. Sonata for piano & violin Op. 13 No. 1 in B♭ major (No. 57)
- Craw 68. Sonata for piano & violin Op. 13 No. 2 in D major (No. 58)
- Craw 69. Sonata for piano & violin Op. 13 No. 3 in G major (No. 59)
- Craw 70. Romance de Figaro for keyboard (lost)
- Craw 71. Piano Sonata Op. 14 No. 1 in C major (No. 60)
- Craw 72. Piano Sonata Op. 14 No. 2 in G major (No. 61)
- Craw 73. Piano Sonata Op. 14 No. 3 in F major (No. 62)
- Craw 74. Sonata for keyboard & violin Op. 16 No. 1 in C major (No. 63)
- Craw 75. Sonata for keyboard & violin Op. 16 No. 2 in F major (No. 64)
- Craw 76. Sonata for keyboard & violin Op. 16 No. 3 in G major (No. 65)
- Craw 77. Keyboard Concerto Op. 14 in F major
- Craw 78. Keyboard Concerto Op. 17 in F major
- Craw 79. Sonata for piano & violin Op. 18 No. 1 in B♭ major (No. 66)
- Craw 80. Piano Sonata Op. 18 No. 2 in A minor (No. 7)
- Craw 81. Sonata for piano & violin Op. 18 No. 3 in E♭ major (No. 31)
- Craw 82. Air de Calpigi varié for piano in C major
- Craw 83. Variations for keyboard on a theme by Salieri (lost)
- Craw 84. Favorite air varied for keyboard in B♭ major
- Craw 85. Favorite air varied for keyboard in C major
- Craw 86. Favorite air varied for keyboard in F major
- Craw 87. "God Save the King" with variations for piano in C major
- Craw 88. Sonata for keyboard & flute Op. 19,20 No. 1 in G major
- Craw 89. Sonata for keyboard & flute Op. 19,20 No. 2 in C major
- Craw 90. Sonata for keyboard & flute Op. 19,20 No. 3 in F major
- Craw 91. Sonata for keyboard & flute Op. 19,20 No. 4 in A major
- Craw 92. Sonata for keyboard & flute Op. 19,20 No. 5 in C major
- Craw 93. Sonata for keyboard & flute Op. 19,20 No. 6 in E♭ major
- Craw 94. Trio for piano, flute & cello Op. 21 in C major
- Craw 95. "The Rosary" arranged for piano in B♭ major
- Craw 96. Piano Sonata Op. 24 in B♭ major (No. 8)
- Craw 97. Piano Concerto Op. 22 in B♭ major
- Craw 98. "The Sufferings of the Queen of France" for keyboard Op. 23 in C minor
- Craw 99. Favorite song arranged as a rondo for keyboard in F major
- Craw 100. "Rosline Castle" with variations for piano in C minor
- Craw 101. "Within a mile of Edinburgh" with variations for keyboard in B♭ major
- Craw 102. Duet for harp & piano Op. 26 in F major
- Craw 103. "Lord Howe's Hornpipe" arranged for piano in F major
- Craw 104. Piano Concerto Op. 27 in F major
- Craw 105. "Viotti's favorite polacca" arranged for piano in A major
- Craw 106. Leçon progressive for keyboard Op. 32 No. 1 in C major
- Craw 107. Leçon progressive for keyboard Op. 32 No. 2 in F major
- Craw 108. Leçon progressive for keyboard Op. 32 No. 3 in C major
- Craw 109. Leçon progressive for keyboard Op. 32 No. 4 in F major
- Craw 110. Leçon progressive for keyboard Op. 32 No. 5 in C major
- Craw 111. Leçon progressive for keyboard Op. 32 No. 6 in F major
- Craw 112. Leçon progressive for keyboard Op. 32 No. 7 in B♭ major
- Craw 113. Leçon progressive for keyboard Op. 32 No. 8 in G major
- Craw 114. Leçon progressive for keyboard Op. 32 No. 9 in B♭ major
- Craw 115. Leçon progressive for keyboard Op. 32 No. 10 in G major
- Craw 116. Leçon progressive for keyboard Op. 32 No. 11 in G minor
- Craw 117. Leçon progressive for keyboard Op. 32 No. 12 in G major
- Craw 118. Sonata for piano & violin Op. 28 No. 1 in C major (No. 67)
- Craw 119. Sonata for piano & violin Op. 28 No. 2 in F major (No. 68)
- Craw 120. Sonata for piano & violin Op. 28 No. 3 in B♭ major (No. 69)
- Craw 121. Sonata for piano & violin Op. 28 No. 4 in D major (No. 70)
- Craw 122. Sonata for piano & violin Op. 28 No. 5 in G minor (No. 71)
- Craw 123. Sonata for piano & violin Op. 28 No. 6 in E♭ major (No. 72)
- Craw 124. "Favorite Welsh air" arranged for piano in A major
- Craw 125. Piano Concerto Op. 29 in C major
- Craw 126. Sonata for piano & violin Op. 25 No. 1 in F major (No. 73)
- Craw 127. Piano Sonata Op. 25 No. 2 in D major (No. 9)
- Craw 128. Sonata for piano & violin Op. 25 No. 3 in G major (No. 74)
- Craw 129. Harp Concerto Op. 30 in C major
- Craw 130. Grand March in Alceste arranged for piano in G major
- Craw 131. "Madame Del Caro's Hornpipe" arranged for piano in A major
- Craw 132. Piano Trio Op. 31 No. 1 in B♭ major
- Craw 133. Piano Sonata Op. 31 No. 2 in D major (No. 10)
- Craw 134. Piano Trio Op. 31 No. 3 in C major
- Craw 135. Prelude for piano Op. 31 No. 1 in B♭ major
- Craw 136. Prelude for piano Op. 31 No. 2 in D major
- Craw 137. Prelude for piano Op. 31 No. 3 in C major
- Craw 138. "A Scotch air" arranged for piano in F major
- Craw 139. "The Royal quick step" arranged for piano in G major
- Craw 140. "Scythian Dance" arranged for piano in C minor
- Craw 141. Piano Trio Op. 24 No. 1 in F major
- Craw 142. Piano Trio Op. 24 No. 2 in D major
- Craw 143. Piano Trio Op. 24 No. 3 in B♭ major
- Craw 144. Sonata for piano 4 hands Op. 33 in C major
- Craw 145. "Alla Tedesca" arranged for piano in b♭ major
- Craw 146. "La Chasse" for piano in F major
- Craw 147. Harp Sonata Op. 34 No. 1 in E♭ major
- Craw 148. Harp Sonata Op. 34 No. 2 in B♭ major
- Craw 149. Piano Sonata Op. 35 No. 1 in B♭ major (No. 11)
- Craw 150. Piano Sonata Op. 35 No. 2 in G major (No. 12)
- Craw 151. Piano Sonata Op. 35 No. 3 in C minor (No. 13)
- Craw 152. The Naval Battle and Total Defeat for piano in D major
- Craw 153. Piano Concerto Op. 40 in B♭ major
- Craw 154. Sonata for piano & violin Op. 36 in C major (No. 75)
- Craw 155. The favorite Romance of the Captive of Spilberg (opera, libretto by Prince Hoare)
- Craw 156. Music composed for the Ceremony of the Victories for piano in D major
- Craw 157. Favorite duet of Tink a Tink arranged for piano in G major
- Craw 158. Piano Concerto in F major
- Craw 159. Overture to Feudal Times in C major
- Craw 160. Harp Sonatine I in C major
- Craw 161. Harp Sonatine II in F major
- Craw 162. Harp Sonatine III in G major
- Craw 163. Harp Sonatine IV in B♭ major
- Craw 164. Harp Sonatine V in F major
- Craw 165. Harp Sonatine VI in E♭ major
- Craw 166. Piano Sonata Op. 39 No. 1 in G major (No. 14)
- Craw 167. Piano Sonata Op. 39 No. 2 in C major (No. 15)
- Craw 168. Piano Sonata Op. 39 No. 3 in B♭ major (No. 16)
- Craw 169. Piano Trio Op. 37 in E♭ major
- Craw 170. Duet for harp & piano Op. 38 in E♭ major
- Craw 171. "Poor Jonas" with variations for piano (lost)
- Craw 172. Piano Quintet Op. 41 in F minor
- Craw 173. Overture to Pizarro composed and arranged for piano in D minor
- Craw 174. Favorite duet of "All shall leave" arranged for piano in G major
- Craw 175. Favorite duet of "Adieu" arranged for piano in B♭ major
- Craw 176. "Chi serba costanza" in B♭ major
- Craw 177. Piano Sonata Op. 43 in A major (No. 17)
- Craw 178. Piano Sonata Op. 44 in E♭ major (No. 18)
- Craw 179. Piano Sonata Op. 45 No. 1 in B♭ major (No. 19)
- Craw 180. Piano Sonata Op. 45 No. 2 in G major (No. 20)
- Craw 181. Piano Sonata Op. 45 No. 3 in D major (No. 21)
- Craw 182. Sonata for microchordon in B♭ major Op. 45
- Craw 183. Harp Sonata in F major
- Craw 184. Piano Sonata Op. 47 No. 1 in D major (No. 22)
- Craw 185. Piano Sonata Op. 47 No. 2 in G major (No. 23)
- Craw 186. Sonata for piano 4 hands Op. 48 in C major
- Craw 187. Piano Concerto Op. 49 in G minor
- Craw 188. Favorite duet polonoise for piano 3 hands in E♭ major Op. 50
- Craw 189. Duettino for harp & piano in C major
- Craw 190. Duettino for harp & piano in F major
- Craw 191. Waltz I for piano & violin or flute in G major
- Craw 192. Waltz II for piano & violin or flute in B♭ major
- Craw 193. Waltz III for piano & violin or flute in C major
- Craw 194. Waltz IV for piano & violin or flute in A major
- Craw 195. Waltz V for piano & violin or flute in B♭ major
- Craw 196. Waltz VI for piano & violin or flute in F major
- Craw 197. Piano Quartet in E♭ major Op. 56
- Craw 198. "Ertönet laut ihr bebenden Saiten" in B♭ major
- Craw 199. Fantasia & fugue for piano in F minor Op. 55
- Craw 200. Canzonet Op. 52 No. 1 "Sehnsucht der Liebe" in C major
- Craw 201. Canzonet Op. 52 No. 2 "Klage der Liebe" in A♭ major
- Craw 202. Canzonet Op. 52 No. 3 "Hoffnung" in E♭ major
- Craw 203. Canzonet Op. 52 No. 4 "Das Warum" in E♭ major
- Craw 204. Canzonet Op. 52 No. 5 "Dauer der Liebe" in G major
- Craw 205. Canzonet Op. 52 No. 6 "Eigensinn der Liebe" in B♭ major
- Craw 206. Concerto for 2 pianos in B♭ major Op. 63
- Craw 207. Sonata for piano 4 hands in C major
- Craw 208. String Quartet Op. 60 No. 1 in G major
- Craw 209. String Quartet Op. 60 No. 2 in B♭ major
- Craw 210. String Quartet Op. 60 No. 3 in E♭ major
- Craw 211. Piano Sonata in F♯ Minor, Op. 61 "Elégie harmonique sur la mort de Louis Ferdinand" (No. 24)
- Craw 212. "La Consolation" for piano in B♭ major Op. 62
- Craw 213. Lied in drei Noten B C D in B♭ major
- Craw 214. Trio for piano, flute & cello Op. 65 in F major
- Craw 215. Canon a 4: "Ha, ha, ich merke wohl" in B♭ major
- Craw 216. Canon a 4: "Venerabilis Barba" in B minor
- Craw 217. Canon a 3: "Weg mit Quart und Folio Bänden" in G major
- Craw 218. Canon a 4: "Ach, wie soll ich das gestehen" in F minor
- Craw 219. Canon a 4: "Mit Mädchen sich vertragen" in A major
- Craw 220. Canon a 4: "Der Zornige" in G minor
- Craw 221. Piano Sonata Op. 64 in A♭ major (No. 26)
- Craw 222. Anglaise for piano in C major
- Craw 223. Anglaise for piano in G major
- Craw 224. Waltz for piano in C major
- Craw 225. Waltz for piano in E♭ major
- Craw 226. Andantino con variazioni for piano in A major
- Craw 227. Fugue for piano 4 hands Op. 64 No. 1 in D major
- Craw 228. Fugue for piano 4 hands Op. 64 No. 2 in G minor
- Craw 229. Fugue for piano 4 hands Op. 64 No. 3 in F major
- Craw 230. Sonata for piano 4 hands Op. 67 No. 1 in C major
- Craw 231. Sonata for piano 4 hands Op. 67 No. 2 in F major
- Craw 232. Sonata for piano 4 hands Op. 67 No. 3 in B♭ major
- Craw 233. Notturno Concertante in E♭ major Op. 68
- Craw 234. Duet for harp & piano Op. 74 in B♭ major
- Craw 235. Variations for piano Op. 71 No. 1 in B♭ major
- Craw 236. Variations for piano Op. 71 No. 2 in F major
- Craw 237. Variations for piano Op. 71 No. 3 in C major
- Craw 238. Piano Concerto Op. 70 in E♭ major
- Craw 239. Duet for harp & piano Op. 72 in E♭ major
- Craw 240. Sonata for piano & violin Op. 69 No. 1 in B♭ major (No. 76)
- Craw 241. Sonata for piano & violin Op. 69 No. 2 in G major (No. 77)
- Craw 242. Piano Sonata Op. 69 No. 3 in D major (No. 25)
- Craw 243. Duet for harp & piano Op. 73 in F major
- Craw 244. Variations for piano Op. 71 No. 4 in G major
- Craw 245. Variations for piano Op. 71 No. 5 in C minor
- Craw 246. Variations for piano Op. 71 No. 6 in B♭ major
- Craw 247. Piano Sonata Op. 75 in E♭ major (No. 27)
- Craw 248. Fantasia for piano in F major Op. 76
- Craw 249. Romance favorite for piano in E♭ major
- Craw 250. Duet for violins Op. 58 No. 1 (lost)
- Craw 251. Duet for violins Op. 58 No. 2 (lost)
- Craw 252. Duet for violins Op. 58 No. 3 (lost)
- Craw 253. Duet for violins Op. 58 No. 4 (lost)
- Craw 254. Duet for violins Op. 58 No. 5 (lost)
- Craw 255. Duet for violins Op. 58 No. 6 (lost)
- Craw 256. Messe Solemnelle in G major
- Craw 257. Favorite air adapted for harp & piano in E♭ major
- Craw 258. Favorite air adapted for harp & piano in B♭ major
- Craw 259. Piano Sonata Op. 77 in F minor (No. 28)
- Craw 260. Piano Trio Op. post No. 1 in E♭ major
- Craw 261. Piano Trio Op. post No. 2 in B♭ major
- Craw 262. Canon a 4: "Il Escorcismo della Podagra" in C minor
- Craw 263. "The Brunswick March" for piano in D major
- Craw 264. Harp Concerto in B♭ major
- Craw 265. Harp Concerto in E♭ major (lost)
- Craw 266. Harp Concerto in F major (lost)
- Craw 267. Harp Concerto in C major (lost)
- Craw 268-277. 6 Contredanses & 4 Waltzes by Mozart arr. for piano (lost)
- Craw 278. "Fernando's Hochgesang an Clara" for piano in G major
- Craw 279. "Lieli e amorosi" for tenor (lost)
- Craw 280. "La mia testa" in C major
- Craw 281. Moravian Waltz for piano in D major
- Craw 282. Piano Sonata (No. 78) (lost)
- Craw 283. Turkish March for piano in C major
- Craw 284. Art of Playing the Piano Forte or Harpsichord
- Craw 285. Méthode pour le Piano Forte et Doigté
- Craw 286. Klavierschule von J. Pleyel
- Craw 287. Pianoforte-Schule nach der Englischen Ausgabe

List of Piano Concertos by Dussek:

- Op. 1-1 (Craw 2). Piano Concerto No. 1 in C major (1783)
- Op. 1-2 (Craw 3). Piano Concerto No. 2 in E♭ major (1783)
- Op. 1-3 (Craw 4). Piano Concerto No. 3 in G major (1783)
- Op. 3 (Craw 33). Piano Concerto No. 4 in E♭ major (1787)
- Op. 14 (Craw 77). Piano Concerto No. 5 in F major (1791)
- Op. 17 (Craw 78). Piano Concerto No. 6 in F major (1792)
- Op. 22 (Craw 97). Piano Concerto No. 7 in B♭ major (1793)
- Op. 27 (Craw 104). Piano Concerto No. 8 in F major (1794)
- Op. 29 (Craw 125). Piano Concerto No. 9 in C major (1795)
- Op. 40 (Craw 153). Piano Concerto No. 10 in B♭ major (1799)
- No opus number (Craw 158). Piano Concerto No. 11 in F major (1798?)
- Op. 49 (Craw 187). Piano Concerto No. 12 in G minor (1801)
- Op. 70 (Craw 238). Piano Concerto No. 13 in E♭ major (1810)
- Piano Concerto in B♭ major Craw 1 (lost)
- Piano Concerto Craw D7 (dubious)
- Piano Concerto Craw D8 (dubious)

List of Harp Concertos by Dussek:

- Craw 53. Harp Concerto Op. 15 (1789)
- Craw 129. Harp Concerto Op. 30 (1795)
- Craw 264. Harp Concerto in B♭ major
- Craw 265. Harp Concerto in E♭ major (lost)
- Craw 266. Harp Concerto in F major (lost)
- Craw 267. Harp Concerto in C major (lost)

List of Concertos For Two Pianos by Dussek:

- Craw 206. Concerto for 2 Pianos and Orchestra in B♭ major, Op. 63 (1805-06)

== Works of dubious attribution ==
- Craw D 1. Favorite air varied for harp in B♭ major
- Craw D 2. Favorite air varied for harp in C minor
- Craw D 3. Andantino brillante with variation for harp in B♭ major
- Craw D 4. Italian air varied for harp & flute in B♭ major
- Craw D 5. Italian air varied for harp & flute in E♭ major
- Craw D 6. Italian air varied for harp & flute in C minor
- Craw D 7. Harpsichord Concerto in A major
- Craw D 8. Harpsichord Concerto in D major
- Craw D 9. Nocturne russe for harp in E♭ major
- Craw D10. Favorite air arranged for harp in B♭ major
- Craw D11. Serenade in E♭ major
- Craw D12. Harp Sonata Op. 2 No. 1 in B♭ major
- Craw D13. Harp Sonata Op. 2 No. 2 in G major
- Craw D14. Harp Sonata Op. 2 No. 3 in C minor
- Craw D15–20. 6 Piano Sonatas
- Craw deest. Organ Voluntary on a theme by Handel
