= Piano Sonata No. 26 (Beethoven) =

Piano sonata by Beethoven

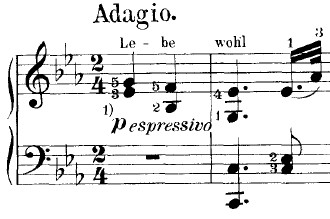
First two bars of the piece, indicating the syllables "Le-be-wohl" over the three-note theme, here an interrupted cadence.

I. Das Lebewohl

II. Abwesenheit

III. Das Wiedersehen
Played by Artur Schnabel in 1932

Ludwig van Beethoven's Piano Sonata No. 26 in E♭ major, Op. 81a, also known as Les Adieux or Das Lebewohl ("The Farewell"), was written during the years 1809 and 1810. This sonata was influenced by Jan Ladislav Dussek's sonata with the same nickname.

The title Les Adieux implies a programmatic nature. The French attack on Vienna, led by Napoléon Bonaparte in 1809, forced Beethoven's patron, Archduke Rudolph, to leave the city. Yet, there is some uncertainty about this nature of the piece — or at least, about the degree to which Beethoven wished this programmatic nature to be known. He titled the three movements "Lebewohl", "Abwesenheit", and "Wiedersehen" ('farewell', 'absence', and 'reunion'), and reportedly regarded the French "Adieux" (said to whole assemblies or cities) as a poor translation of the feeling of the German "Lebewohl" (said heartfully to a single person). Indeed, Beethoven wrote the syllables "Le-be-wohl" over the first three chords.

On the first 1811 publication, a dedication was added reading "On the departure of his Imperial Highness, for the Archduke Rudolph in admiration".

An average performance of the piece lasts about 17 minutes. The sonata is one of Beethoven's most challenging sonatas because of the mature emotions that must be conveyed throughout as well as the technical difficulties involved. It is also the bridge between his middle period and his later period and is considered the third great sonata of the middle period.

== Form ==
The three movements of Les Adieux were originally written in German and French, and the last two movements are described in German because of the unusual tempo. The translation in English shown in italic as below:

1. Das Lebewohl (Les Adieux – The Farewell): Adagio – Allegro (in E♭ major)
2. Abwesenheit (L'Absence – The Absence): Andante espressivo (In gehender Bewegung, doch mit viel Ausdruck – In walking motion, but with much expression) (in C minor)
3. Das Wiedersehen (Le Retour – The Return): Vivacissimamente (Im lebhaftesten Zeitmaße – The liveliest time measurements) (in E♭ major)

=== I. Das Lebewohl ===

The sonata opens in a 2/4 time Adagio with a short, simple motif of three chords, at first forming an interrupted cadence, over which are written the three syllables Le-be-wohl ("Fare-thee-well"). This motif is the basis upon which both the first and the second subject groups are drawn. As soon as the introduction transitions to the exposition, the time signature changes to (alla breve) and the score is marked Allegro.

The first movement oscillates between a turbulent first subject which portrays deep disturbance and a second subject which is more lyrical in nature and gives the impression of reflections. The rhythmic figure of two short notes and a longer note which is used repeatedly in the first subject is developed inexorably through the "development" section, with rich harmonies and discords which are harmonically closer to the later period of Beethoven's compositions than the middle for their intellectual penetration.

The first movement has a long coda that occupies over a quarter of the movement's length. The coda encompasses both the subjects in a display of powerful mastery over composition. Typically the movement played with the expected repeats lasts a little over 7 minutes.

=== II. Abwesenheit ===

The Andante espressivo is harmonically built on variations of the diminished chord and the appoggiatura. The movement is very emotional and is often played with rubato that would be found in later composers such as Robert Schumann and Johannes Brahms. Much of the subject matter is rhythmically repeated consecutively as well as sectionally, perhaps to emphasise the feelings of uncomfortable solitude and fear of no return. The arrival of the dominant seventh chord at the end of movement signals the return to the tonic key, but remains unresolved until the triumphant appearance of the main theme in the final movement (which begins attacca). Typically, this movement lasts just under 4 minutes.

=== III. Das Wiedersehen ===

The finale, also in sonata form, starts joyfully on a B♭ dominant 7th chord, in 6/8 time. After the startling introduction, the first subject appears in the right hand and is immediately transferred to the left hand then repeated twice with an elaboration of the arrangement in the right hand. Before the second subject group arrives, there is one remarkable bridge passage, introducing a phrase that goes from G♭ major to F major chords, first through distinctive forte arpeggios, then in a more delicate, fine piano arrangement.

== Relation to Dussek's Sonata ==
It has been said that this sonata was influenced by Dussek's own Les Adieux.

The pianist Frederick Marvin said that Dussek's sonata could "have been a model for the Les Adieux Sonata by Beethoven ten years later." Marvin further points out the similarities in motives and form in Beethoven's sonata to Dussek's.

== Sources ==
- Kolodin, Irving (1975). The Interior Beethoven. New York: Alfred A. Knopf. ISBN 978-0-394-46626-2.
