= Piano Sonata No. 18 =

Piano Sonata No. 18 may refer to:

- Piano Sonata No. 18 (Beethoven)
- Piano Sonata No. 18 (Dussek)
- Piano Sonata No. 18 (Mozart)
- Piano Sonata in G major, D 894 (Schubert)
