= Piano Sonata No. 28 =

Piano Sonata No. 28 may refer to:

- Piano Sonata No. 28 (Beethoven)
- Piano Sonata No. 28 (Dussek)
