= Laure Colladant =

French fortepianist

Laure Colladant is a contemporary French fortepianist.

== Biography ==
After starting her musical training at Boulogne-sur-Mer in Charles Eloffe's class, Colladant continued at the Conservatoire of Paris, then at the École normale de musique de Paris with Lélia Gousseau and Lucile Bascourret.

She performs in France, Holland, Germany, Switzerland and Italy as well as in several piano festivals in Riom (1991 and 1998), in Perche, during the Promenade en pays d'Auge, at the Festival d'Ambronay, Musique dans le Grésivaudan...

She participates in several radio programs: on Radio France with Rémy Stricker and Anne Charlotte Rémond on Télérama and on Radio suisse romande, a broadcast on the fortepiano with the fortepiano maker and restorer, Johannes Carda.

In addition to the classical repertoire, she has created a work by Graciane Finzi, Univers de Lumière (1991) and Jacques Veyrier dedicated a work in the form of a suite for fortepiano to her in 2006.

Colladant is a teacher at the Conservatoire de Saint-Ouen and teaches chamber music at the Conservatoire de Caen.

She holds the title of chevalier of the Ordre des Arts et des Lettres.

== Discography ==
- Albero, Sonatas for keyboard - Laure Colladant (pianoforte) Johannes Carda, after Anton Walter, Vienna 1790 (1993/1994, 2CD Mandala MAN 4841/42) OCLC 773076963
- CPE Bach, Quatuors pour clavier, flûte, alto et violoncelle, Wq. 93, 94, 95 - Laure Colladant (fortepiano); Philippe Allain-Dupre (flute); Jean-Philippe Vasseur (viola); Antoine Ladrette (cello) (1996, Mandala 4922) OCLC 65964781
- Benda, 3 sonatas for fortepiano (1993, Musicdisc/Accord) OCLC 808028535
- Boëly, Trente caprices for fortepiano Op. 2 (4-8 September 1995, Adès) OCLC 36341102
- Clementi, Sonatas for fortepiano Op. 7 n°3, Op. 8 n°1, Op. 25 n°2, Op. 34 n°2 (16-18 June 1999, Mandala MAN 4970) OCLC 934904165
- Dussek, Duo pour harpe et piano-forte Op. 73; Sonata n°14 Op. 39 n°1; Sonata for harp; Grand duo for harp and fortepiano, Op. 72 n°1 - with Kyunghee Kim-Sutre, harp (1995, Mandala) OCLC 287136813
- Mozart, Sonatas K.330, K.331, K.332, K.333 (17-18 April 1989, Adda) OCLC 404100464
- Schubert, Sonata for piano D.960; Sonata D.894 - Laure Colladant (fortepiano) Filippo Molitor (1828) and Joseph Angst (1825) (2CD Intégral INT 221. 229/2)
- Woelfl (7CD Integral 221240/7, reissue of Mandala and Accord détaillés CDs below)
  - Sonatas for fortepiano Op. 6 (27-29 June 1993, Adès/Accord 465 898–2) OCLC 39079506
  - Sonatas for fortepiano, Op. 15 (Accord 472 727-2)
  - Trios for piano, violin and cello, Op. 23 – Vol. 1 - - Laure Colladant (fortepiano), Elisabeth Balmas (violin) (1996, Mandala 4887) OCLC 416431869
  - Sonatas for fortepiano Op. 28 – Vol.2 (November 1987, Adda 581036 / Mandala MAN4861) OCLC 742858654
  - Duos for fortepiano & harp, Op. 29, 33, 47 – vol. 3 - with Catherine Michel, harp (ADDA / Mandala) OCLC 743069541, 49820151
  - Sonatas for fortepiano Op. 27, 54 (2000, Accord 465 846–2) OCLC 658552325
  - Sonatas for fortepiano Op. 33 (1995, Mandala MAN4860) OCLC 45964207
