= Eli Urbanová =

Czech Esperantist poet and novelist (1922–2012)

- Born: Eliška Vrzáková; 8 February 1922 Čáslav, Czechoslovakia
- Died: 20 January 2012 (aged 89) Prague, Czech Republic
- Language: Czech; Esperanto
- Spouse: Štěpán Urban (1942–1955)

Eli Urbanová (8 February 1922 – 20 January 2012) was a Czech poet, novelist, and Esperantist. She is best known for her autobiographical novel Hetajro dancas.

== Biography ==
Urbanová published her first story in the Czech language in 1935 when she was 13 years old, and her first book of poems, Zrcaldo, was published in 1940 under a pseudonym. In 1942, she married Štěpán Urban. She learned Esperanto in 1948 and wrote her first Esperanto poem in 1950. Urbanová worked as a music teacher in Czechoslovakia, teaching piano, violin, and violoncello. In 1956, she was a co-founder of the Internacia Verkista Asocio. She published her first book of Esperanto poems in 1960.

== Literary style ==
Urbanová is considered to be one of the most important Esperantist writers. Her work has been described as focusing on "the thoughts and feelings of the female soul" and making "even the most ordinary objects become symbols in her poems". William Auld described her as a successor to Julio Baghy.

== Notable works ==
- Zrcaldo (Mirror, 1940)
- Nur tri kolorojn (With Only Three Colors, 1960)
- El subaj fontoj (From Springs Beneath, 1981)
- Verso kaj larmo (Verse and Teardrop, 1986)
- Hetajro dancas (A Hetaera Dances, 1995)
- Vino, viroj kaj kanto (Wine, Men and Song, 1995)
- Peza vino (Heavy Wine, 1996)
- El mia buduaro (From My Boudoir, 2001)
- Rapide pasis la temp' (Time Has Passed Swiftly, 2003)
- Prefere ne tro rigardi retro (2007)

== See also ==
- Czech literature
- Esperanto literature

== Bibliography ==
- Sutton, Geoffrey (2008). Concise Encyclopedia of the Original Literature of Esperanto, 1887–2007. ISBN 9781595690906.
