= Kateřina Veronika Anna Dusíková =

Czech singer, harpist, pianist and composer

Kateřina Veronika Anna Dusíková (8 March 1769 – 24 March 1833) was a Czech singer, harpist, pianist and composer.

She was also known as Veronika Rosalia Dusik (Dussek), Veronika Elisabeta Dusíková and Veronica Cianchettini. She was born in Čáslav, Bohemia, and began her studies in music with her organist father Jan Josef Dusik. She later moved to London to stay with her brother, composer Jan Ladislav Dussek, and married music publisher Francesco Cianchettini. She died in London in 1833.

== Works ==
Dusiková composed works including two piano concertos and a number of solo piano works. Selected compositions include:

- Sonata, op. 8 for piano
- Variations on a Roman Air for piano
- Sonates (Klav.) (C, B, e) (lost during wartime)
