= Čáslav Airport =

Military airport in Czech Republic

Čáslav Airport Letiště Čáslav
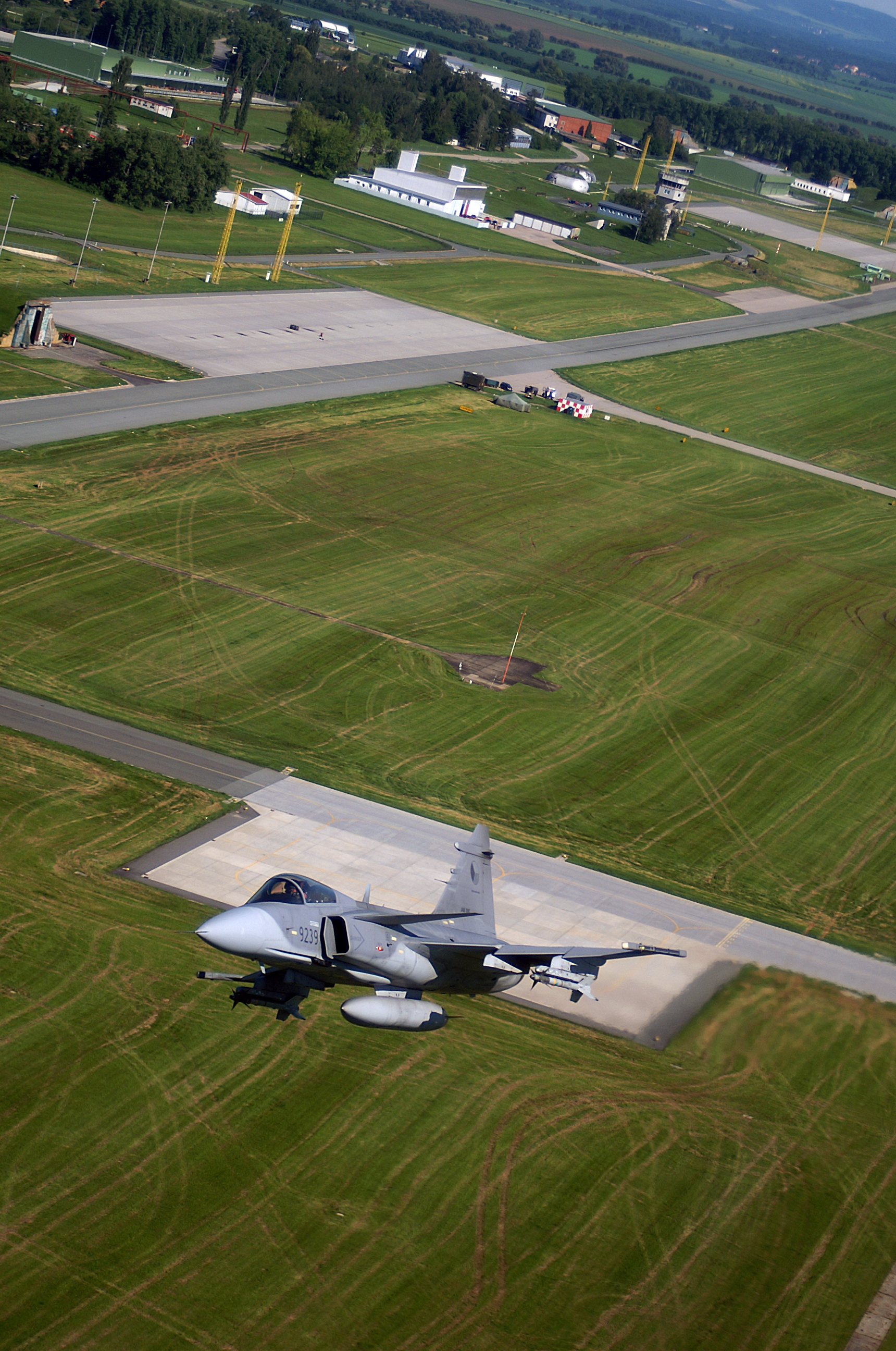
- Saab JAS-39 Gripen taking off from Čáslav Airport, 2010
- IATA: none; ICAO: LKCV

Summary
- Airport type: Military
- Operator: Czech Air Force
- Serves: Čáslav
- Location: Czech Republic
- Coordinates: 49°56′24″N 15°22′48″E
- Website: https://afbcaslav.mo.gov.cz/
- Interactive map of Čáslav Airport

Čáslav Airport (Czech: Letiště Čáslav) is a military airport operated by Czech Armed Forces. The airport complex is located in Čáslav in the Central Bohemian Region of the Czech Republic, near the village of Chotusice. The airport was built between 1952 and 1958. Since December 1, 2003, it has been the headquarters of the 21st Tactical Air Force Base, honorably named "Zvolenská", within the Czech Air Force.

The Čáslav Airport is home to the 211th Tactical Squadron with JAS-39 Gripen fighter jets, the 212th Tactical Squadron with L-159A ALCA fighter jets, and the 213th Training Squadron with two-seater "Alkas" (L-159T1) and "Albatrosses" (L-39ZA). The 21st Tactical Air Force Base holds open days for the public every two years.

== 2025 burglary ==
At the beginning of 2025, an unknown perpetrator broke into the airport through a hole in the fence, stealing an unlocked car that had been driven to work by one of the airport's employees. The perpetrator drifted across the airport grounds in the stolen car before crashing the vehicle into a fence. Members of the military police were unable to determine the man's identity and closed the case in August 2025. General Jiří Šedivý described the January incident and the army's communication after it as a huge failure. The postponement of the investigation into the incident gave rise to a number of internet memes, one of which concerned the inability to protect the F-35s that are to be stationed at the airport after their purchase from the United States.
