= Augustin Šenkýř =

Czech violinist, composer, organist and roman catholic priest

Augustin Šenkýř (born Václav Šenkýř; 23 December 1736 – 16 January 1796) was a Czech violinist, gambist, composer, organist and Roman Catholic priest.

== Biography ==
Augustin Šenkýř was born in Dobruška.

Not much is known about his early education. In 1764, he took his famous (public?) vows with the Benedictines of Emmaus and a year later he was ordained a priest. He adopted the monastic name of Augustin.

He was the director of the choir at the Emmaus Monastery in Prague. He was known as an excellent organist, violinist and viola da gamba player. He also wrote a school of playing for this instrument: Fundament für die Viola da gamba. He was also famous as a teacher. Among other people, he taught the composer Franz Benedikt Dussek.

His work was very popular in its time. Many church compositions have been preserved in Prague monasteries and churches, and particularly in Roudnice, Klatovy, Želiv, Choceň, Broumov and Žamberk. Stylistically, he is representative of the late Baroque. His music features singing melodies, often with elements of folk music. Homophony predominates, and only in places do we hear polyphonic parts.

== Selected works ==
Šenkýř's works still feature in concert performance, for example:

- Aria pastoralis for alto, chamber orchestra and organ.
- Haec die festiva
- Offertory ex D per omni Festivitate Laudate Deum nostrum
- Festa sanctorum
- Aria pastoralis: "In Bethlehem, pastores, natus est Jesulus"
