= Joseph Woelfl =

Austrian pianist and composer (1773–1812)

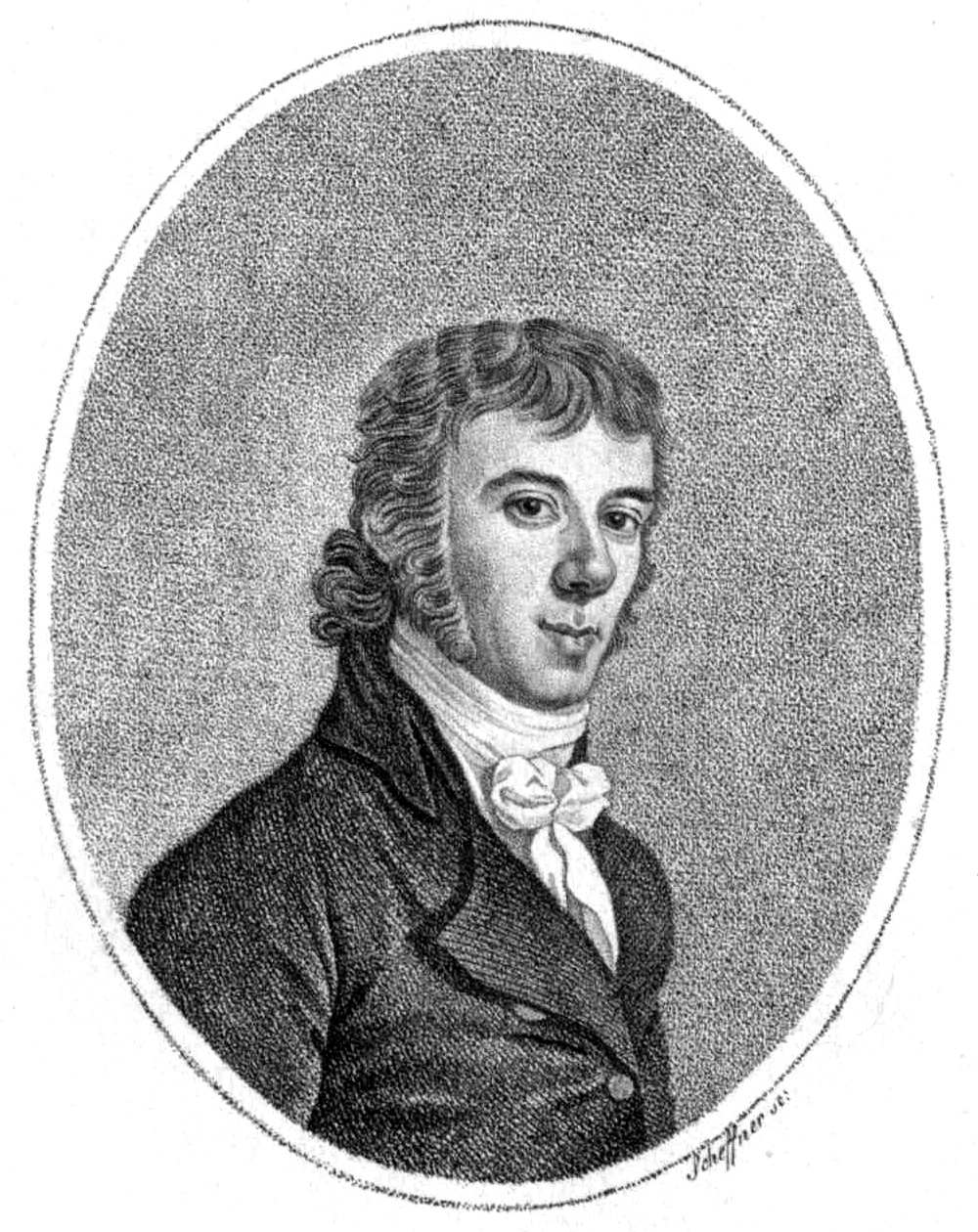
Joseph Woelfl

Joseph Johann Baptist Woelfl (surname sometimes written in the German form Wölfl; 24 December 1773 – 21 May 1812) was an Austrian pianist and composer of the late Classical period.

== Life ==
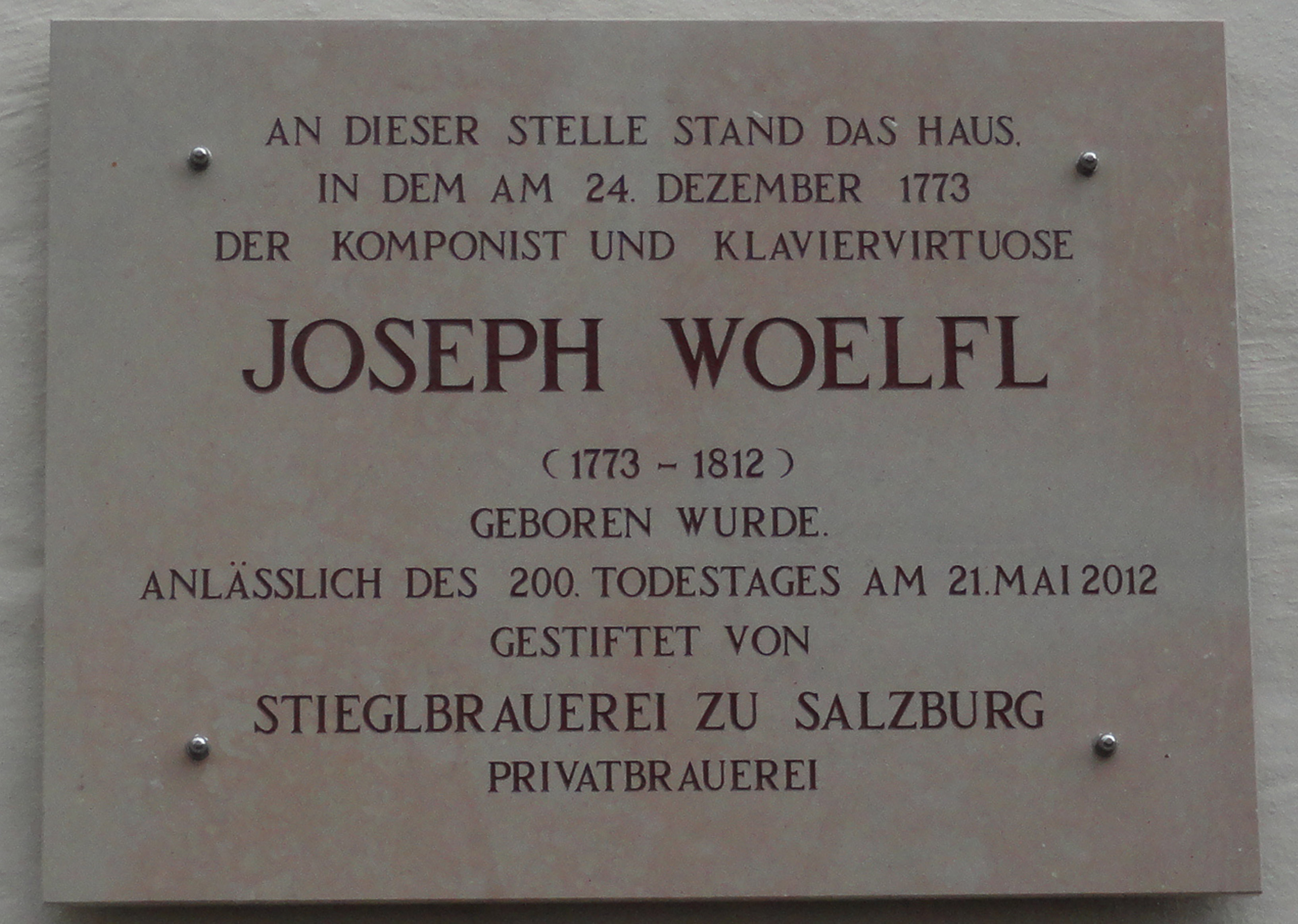
Memorial plaque at Woelfl's birthplace, donated 2012 by Stieglbrauerei

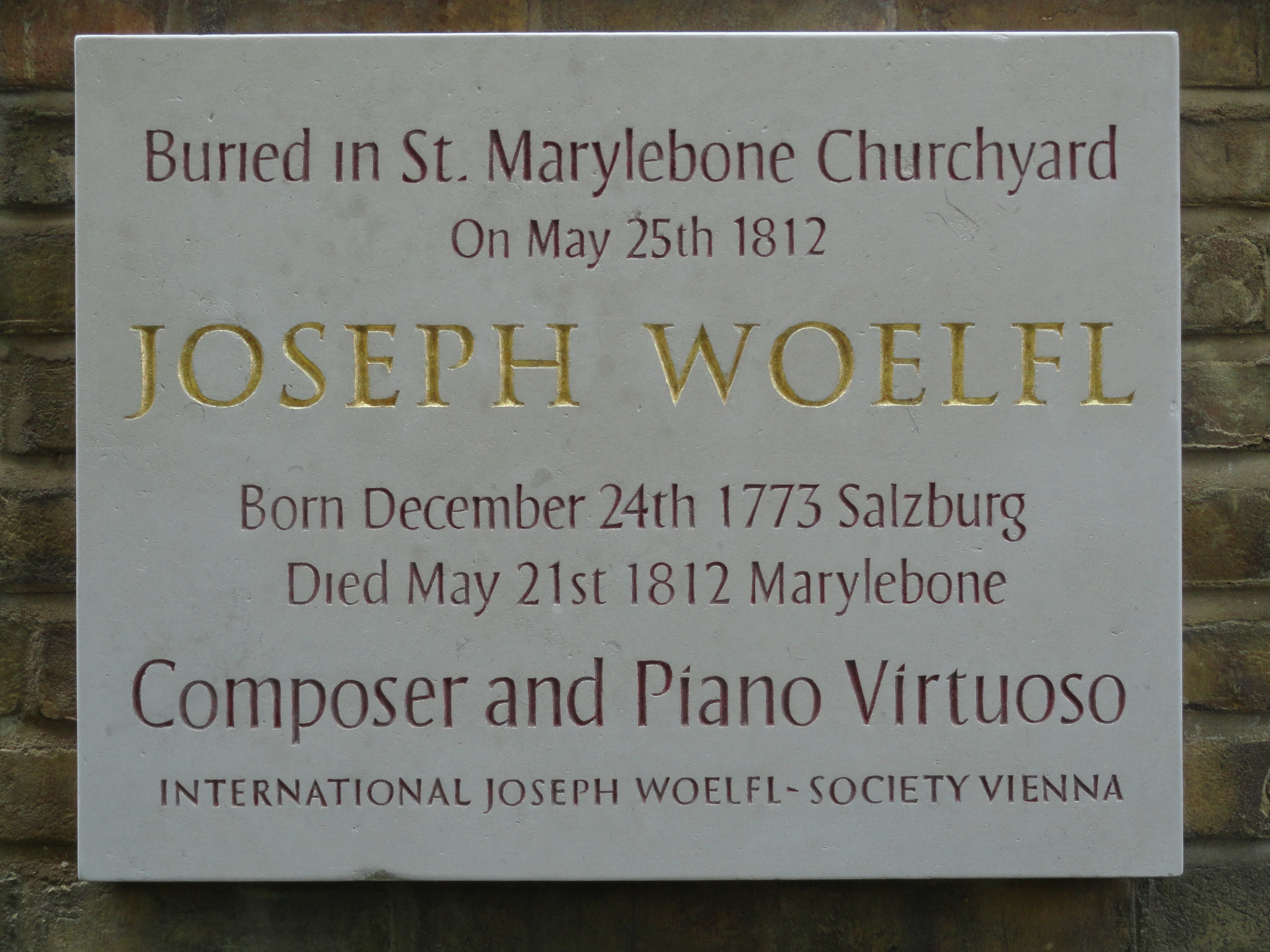
Plaque (2012) in London's St. Marylebone Churchyard (200th anniversary of his death)

Woelfl was born in Salzburg, where he studied music under Leopold Mozart and Michael Haydn.

He first appeared in public as a soloist on the violin at the age of seven. Moving to Vienna in 1790 he visited Wolfgang Amadeus Mozart and may have taken lessons from him. His first opera, Der Höllenberg, appeared there in 1795.

Woelfl was over 6 feet tall, with an enormous finger span (his hand could span a thirteenth, according to his contemporary Václav Tomášek); to his wide grasp of the keyboard he owed a facility of execution which he turned to good account, especially in his improvised performances. Like the virtuoso violinist Paganini, he probably had Marfan syndrome, which is associated with these physical characteristics.

Although he dedicated his 1798 sonatas Op. 6 to Beethoven, the two were rivals. Beethoven bested Woelfl in a piano 'duel' at the house of Baron Raimund Wetzlar in 1799, after which Woelfl's local popularity waned. However, Beethoven deeply admired his music following the duel. After spending 1801 to 1805 in Paris, Woelfl moved to London, where his first concert performance was on 27 May 1805. On 12 March 1806 he published Six English Songs which he dedicated to the English soprano Jane Bianchi.

In England, he enjoyed commercial if not critical success. In 1808 he published his Sonata, Op. 41, which he entitled "Non Plus Ultra" on account of its technical difficulty. In reply to the challenge, a sonata by Dussek which was originally entitled "Le Retour à Paris" was reprinted with the title Plus Ultra, with an ironic dedication to Non Plus Ultra. He also completed for publication an unfinished sonata of George Pinto.

Woelfl suffered from tuberculosis, and died of the disease in Great Marylebone Street, London, on 21 May 1812. He is buried in St. Marylebone Churchyard.

His music was championed and performed by Romantic composers like Beethoven, Schubert, Mendelssohn, Chopin and Liszt.

== Recordings ==
Woelfl's works have long disappeared from the concert repertory. However, in 2003 four selected piano sonatas of his (Op. 25 and Op. 33) were recorded by the pianist Jon Nakamatsu (Harmonia Mundi CD # 907324). (An Adda CD in 1988 contained his three Opus 28 sonatas, played by Laure Colladant, who also recorded the sonatas Opus 6 for Adès in 1993 and the three Opus 33 sonatas for the label Mandala in 1995.)

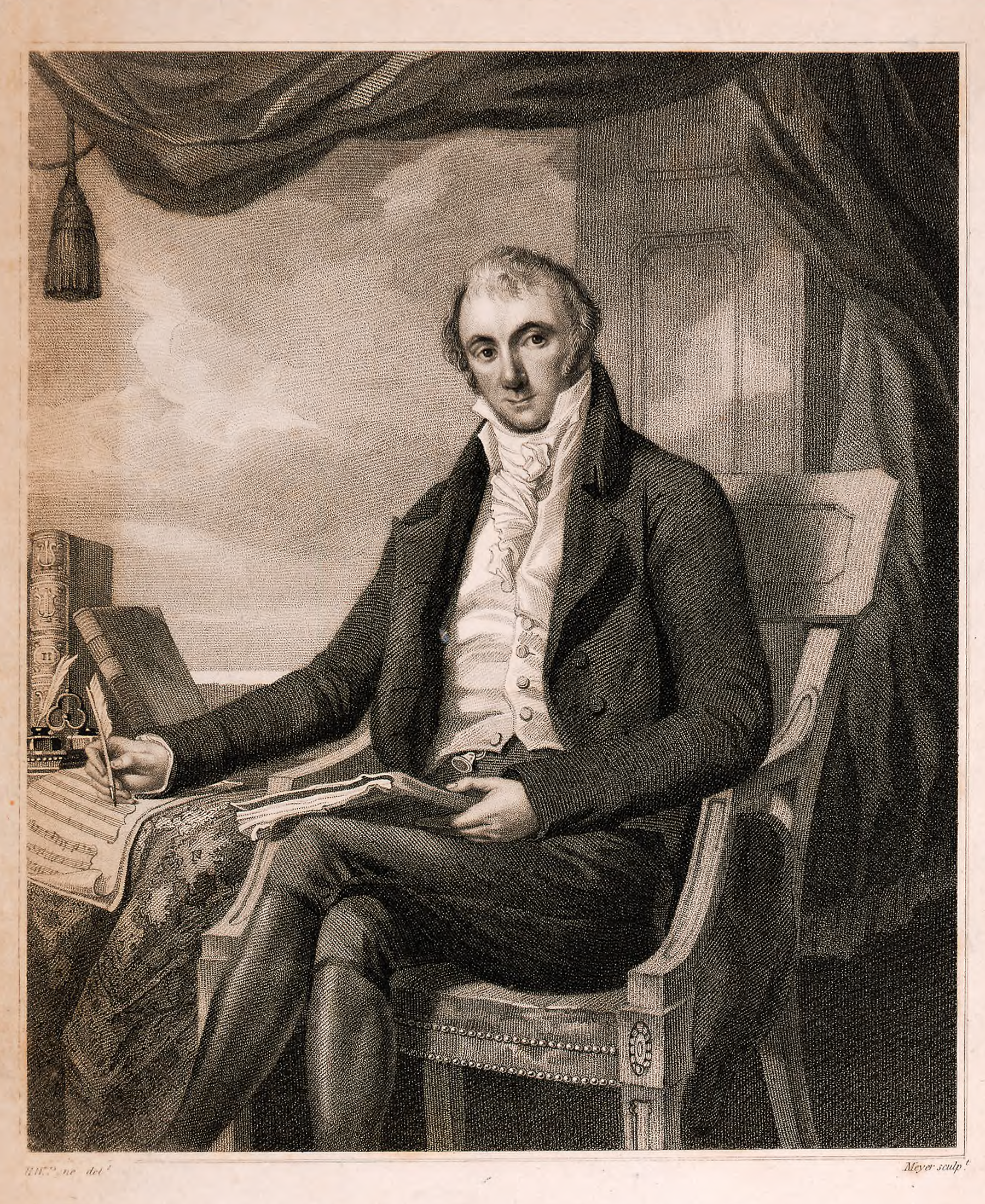
Joseph Woelfl (1811)

In 2006, German pianist Yorck Kronenberg recorded Woelfl's piano concertos 1, 5 and 6 in addition to the second movement from the piano concerto 4, which was otherwise a re-release of concerto 1. The piano concertos closely resemble the later piano concertos of Mozart, who had revolutionized the genre; they can be distinguished from Mozart's works by the larger range of the piano, which had been extended shortly after Mozart's death. Nataša Veljković has since recorded the 2nd and 3rd Piano Concertos and the Concerto da Camera in E-flat major (1810) on CPO.

There are also now recordings of the two symphonies (Pratum Integrum Orchestra, 2008), three string quartets (Quatuor Mosaïques, 2012), and the Grand Duo for cello and piano. Toccata Classics has issued two CDs of the piano music (2017 and 2021). In 2021, Dutch pianist Mattias Spee recorded an album with works by Joseph Woelfl with record label TRPTK.

== Works ==
=== Piano concertos ===
- Piano Concerto No. 1, Op. 20 in G major (c. 1802–1803)
- Piano Concerto No. 2, Op. 26 in E major (published c. 1806)
- Piano Concerto No. 3, Op. 32 in F major
- Piano Concerto No. 4, Op. 36 in G major "The Calm" (published c.1808)
- Piano Concerto No. 5, Op. 43 in C major "Grand Military Concerto" (1799?)
- Piano Concerto No. 6, Op. 49 in D major "The Cuckoo" (published 1809)

=== Symphonies ===
- Symphony in G minor, Op. 40. Dedicated to Luigi Cherubini. OCLC 905233658 This work is rather larger in dimensions (320+ bars in each of first movement and finale) than Woelfl's Op. 41.
- Symphony in C major, Op. 41. Dedicated to Johann Peter Salomon. OCLC 905233657.
- IMSLP has an autograph manuscript of an 1807 Symphony No. 3 by Woelfl (in one movement, or one movement of a larger work).
- A publication ca.1825 was made of 3 Grand Symphonies by Wölfl. (The British Library record does not give an opus number.)
- The Moldenhauer archive has (in manuscript, though possibly not autograph) part of what is described as "J. Woelfl's 5th grand sinfonia: for full band".OCLC 122417037. Dated March 1808.

=== String quartets ===
- 3 String Quartets, Op. 4, dedicated to Leopold Staudinger
- String Quartets, Op. 5 (3 or more?)
- 6 String Quartets, Op. 10. Dedicated to Count Moritz Fries.
- 3 String Quartets, Op. 30. Dedicated to Mr. Bassi Guaita. OCLC 905231734
- Six String Quartets, Op. 51. Published by Lavenu in London (British Library Holdings).

=== Operas ===
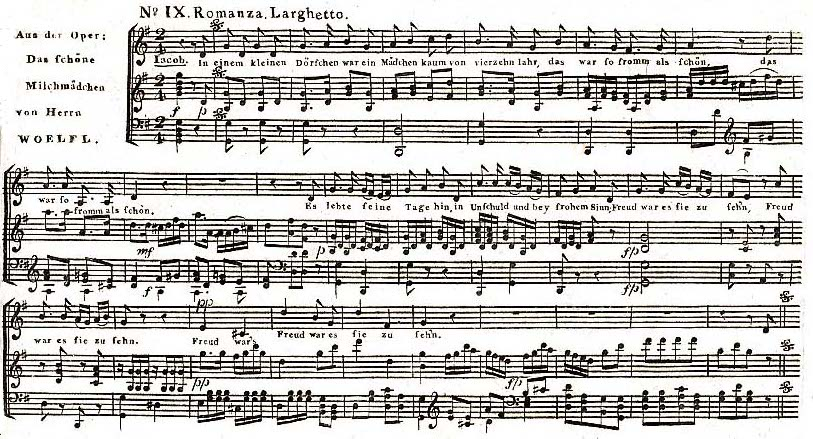
"Romanza" of the Opera Das schöne Milchmädchen

- Der Höllenberg (Theater auf der Wieden 1795), libretto by Emanuel Schikaneder
- Das schöne Milchmädchen, oder Der Guckkasten (1797)
- Der Kopf ohne Mann (1798)
- Liebe macht kurzen Prozess, oder Heirat auf gewisse Art (1798)
- Das trojanische Pferd (1799)
- L'Amour romanesque (1804)
- Fernando, ou Les maures (1805)

=== Other works ===
- 68 Sonatas for the piano, several sonatas for piano and violin, 18 piano trios, and some 4-hands music
- Grand Duo in D minor for Pianoforte and Violoncello, Op. 31, dedicated to Madame Hollander
- Clarinet concerto in B♭ major (premiered 1796)
- Variations, Rondós, German dances...
