= Frederick Marvin =

American pianist and music scholar

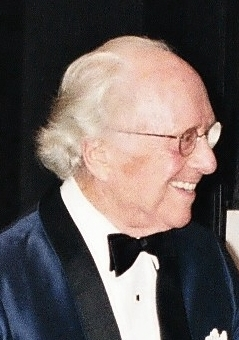
Portrait of Frederick Marvin

Frederick Marvin (June 11, 1920 – May 11, 2017) was an American concert pianist and music scholar. He studied with Milan Blanchet, Artur Schnabel, Rudolf Serkin, and Claudio Arrau, who became Marvin's mentor. Marvin performed at New York's Carnegie Hall in 1948 and received an award for the best debut of the season.

Marvin moved to Syracuse, New York in 1968 where he was initially an artist-in-residence and later professor and head of the piano department at Syracuse University. He also was a visiting professor at the German Phillips University of Marburg.

He was the recipient of various grants including two Del Amo Foundation grants, three Fulbright Fellowships, and three grants from the United States-Spanish Joint Committee for Cultural and Educational Cooperation for his research on Soler.

He is known for rediscovering Antonio Soler and Jan Ladislav Dussek.

== Personal life ==
Marvin met his husband Ernst Schuh in 1959, while visiting the grave of composer Anton Bruckner in Austria. Schuh was an opera critic, and also managed Marvin's career as a concert pianist. They lived together as partners for 52 years until New York State legalized same sex marriage. They were married in Austria and Syracuse, NY in 2011, with Mayor Stephanie Miner performing the ceremony in Syracuse.
