= Čáslav =

- Town
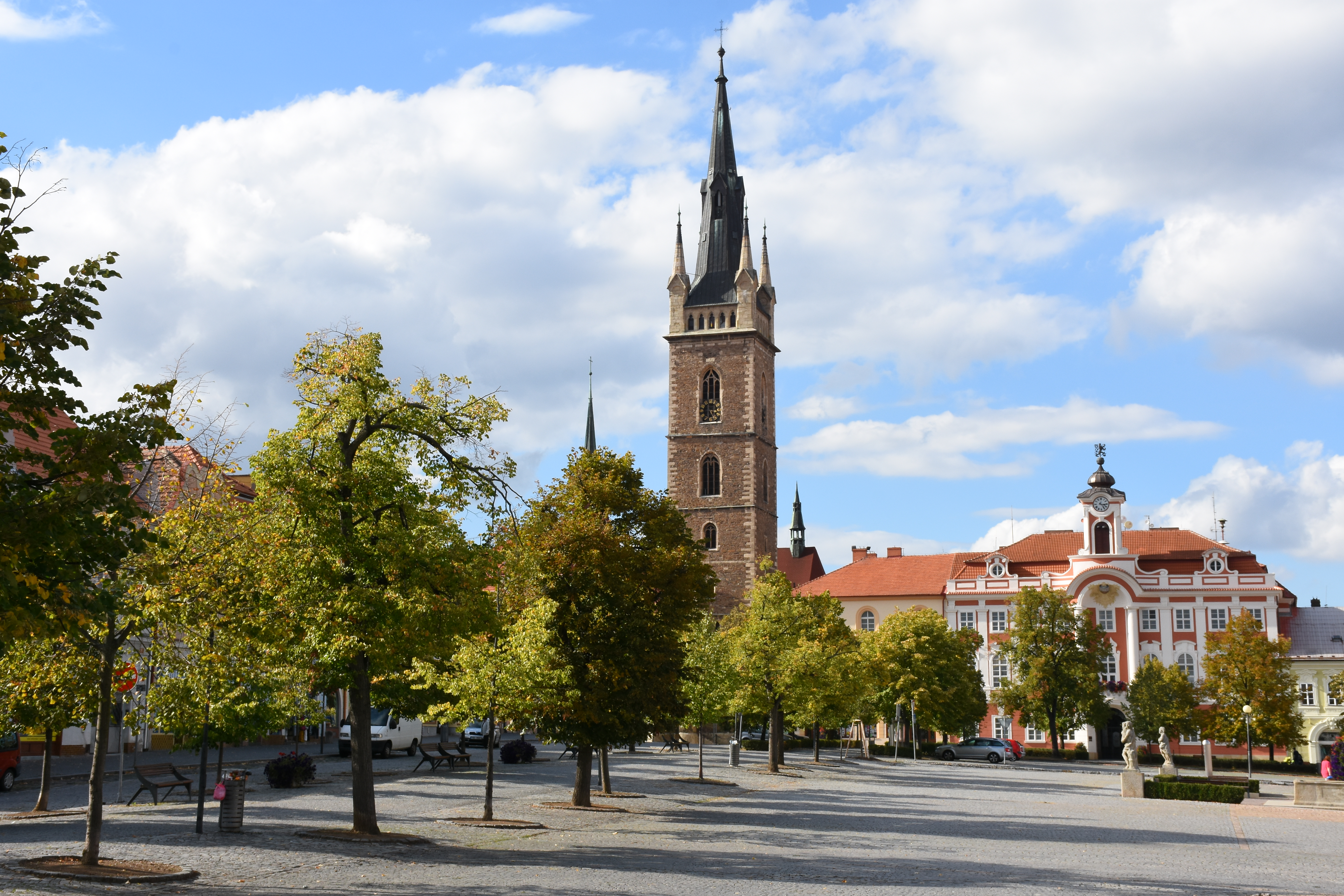
- Town square with the town hall and Church of Saints Peter and Paul

- Flag Coat of arms

- Location in the Czech Republic
- Coordinates: 49°54′42″N 15°23′42″E
- Country: Czech Republic
- Region: Central Bohemian
- District: Kutná Hora
- First mentioned: 1052

Government
  - Mayor: Jaromír Strnad

Area
  - Total: 26.46 km^{2} (10.22 sq mi)
- Elevation: 231 m (758 ft)

Population (2026-01-01)
  - Total: 10,387
  - Density: 392.6/km^{2} (1,017/sq mi)
- Time zone: UTC+1 (CET)
  - Summer (DST): UTC+2 (CEST)
- Postal code: 286 01
- Website: www.meucaslav.cz

Čáslav (Czech pronunciation: [ˈtʃaːslaf]; German: Tschaslau) is a town in Kutná Hora District in the Central Bohemian Region of the Czech Republic. It has about 10,000 inhabitants. The town is located on the Brslenka Stream in the Central Elbe Table.

Čáslav is known for an air base of the Czech Air Force with the military Čáslav Airport. The historic town centre is well preserved and is protected as an urban monument zone. The main landmark of Čáslav is the Church of Saints Peter and Paul.

== Administrative division ==
Čáslav consists of three municipal parts (in brackets population according to the 2021 census):

- Čáslav-Nové Město (9,078)
- Čáslav-Staré Město (894)
- Filipov (182)

== Etymology ==
The name is derived from the personal name Čáslav.

== Geography ==
Čáslav is located about 9 kilometres (6 mi) southeast of Kutná Hora and 30 km (19 mi) southwest of Pardubice. It lies in a flat agricultural landscape in the Central Elbe Table. The Brslenka Stream flows through the town and supplies several ponds, including Podměstský rybník in the town centre. The Klejnárka River crosses the western part of the municipal territory.

== History ==
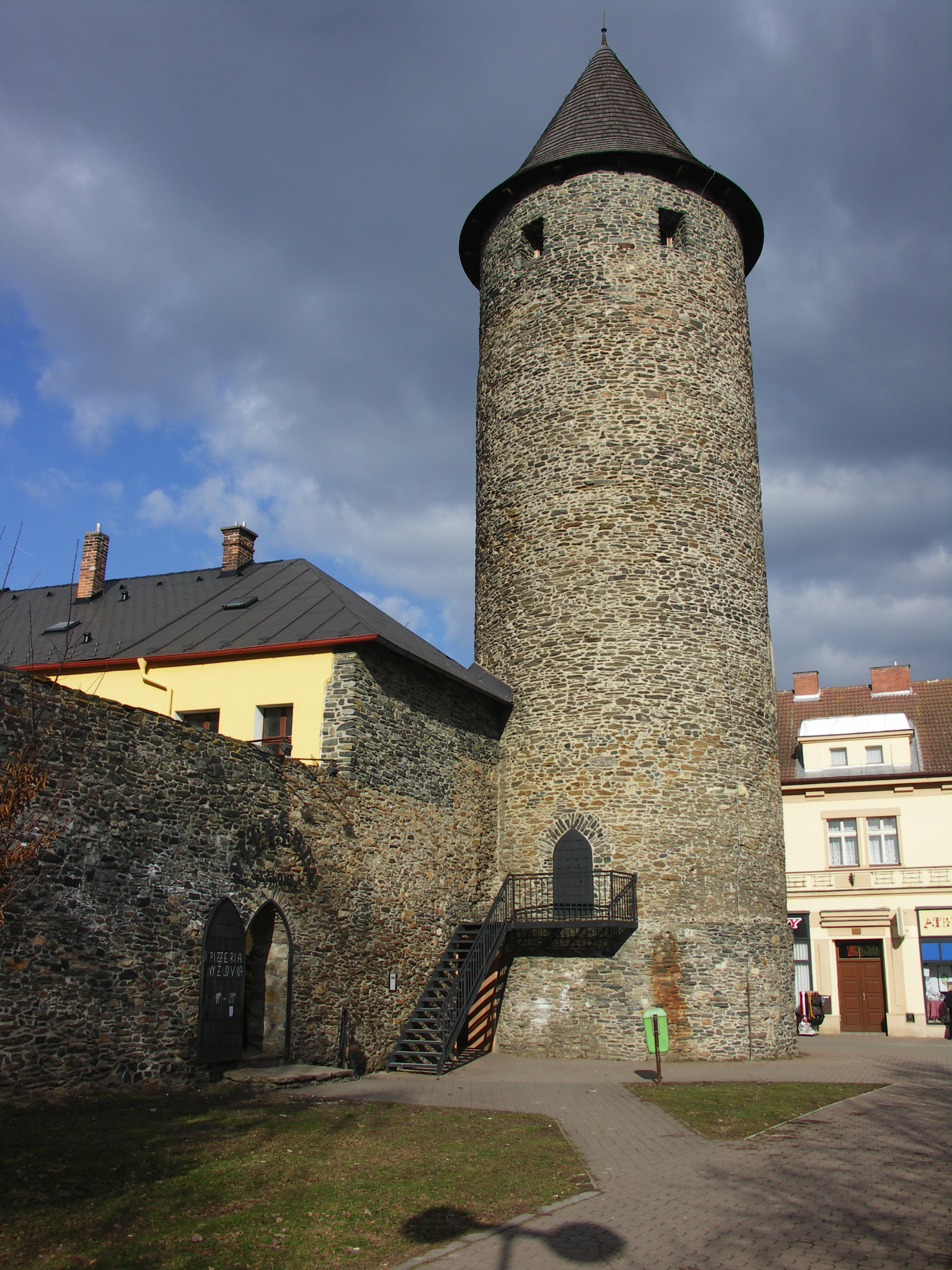
Otakar's Tower

The history of Čáslav begins in the 9th century with the founding of a gord and settlement called Hrádek. In the 11th century, it became a Přemyslid administrative centre. A new royal town with a huge square was founded by King Ottokar II of Bohemia next to Hrádek around 1250. In 1421, Bohemian parliament debated in Čáslav and voted in a new Hussite government.

Two large fires in 1452 and 1522 severely damaged the town. During the Thirty Years' War, in 1639 and 1642, Čáslav was devastated and burned down by Swedish troops. The town however recovered and in 1715, Čáslav became the centre of a region.

=== Jewish population ===
From the 14th century there was a Jewish settlement in Čáslav, but in the 15th century the Jews were expelled. In the middle of the 19th century, only one Jewish family lived in the town. After the equality of the Jews in 1867, many from the area moved to the town of Čáslav. Around 1893, 245 Jews lived in the town, which was about 1–2% of the population.

== Demographics ==
Historical population

Year	Pop.	±%
1869	6,312	—
1880	7,178	+13.7%
1890	8,396	+17.0%
1900	9,174	+9.3%
1910	9,318	+1.6%

Year	Pop.	±%
1921	9,460	+1.5%
1930	10,635	+12.4%
1950	9,407	−11.5%
1961	10,107	+7.4%
1970	10,317	+2.1%

Year	Pop.	±%
1980	9,950	−3.6%
1991	10,107	+1.6%
2001	9,904	−2.0%
2011	10,129	+2.3%
2021	10,154	+0.2%

Source: Censuses

== Air base ==
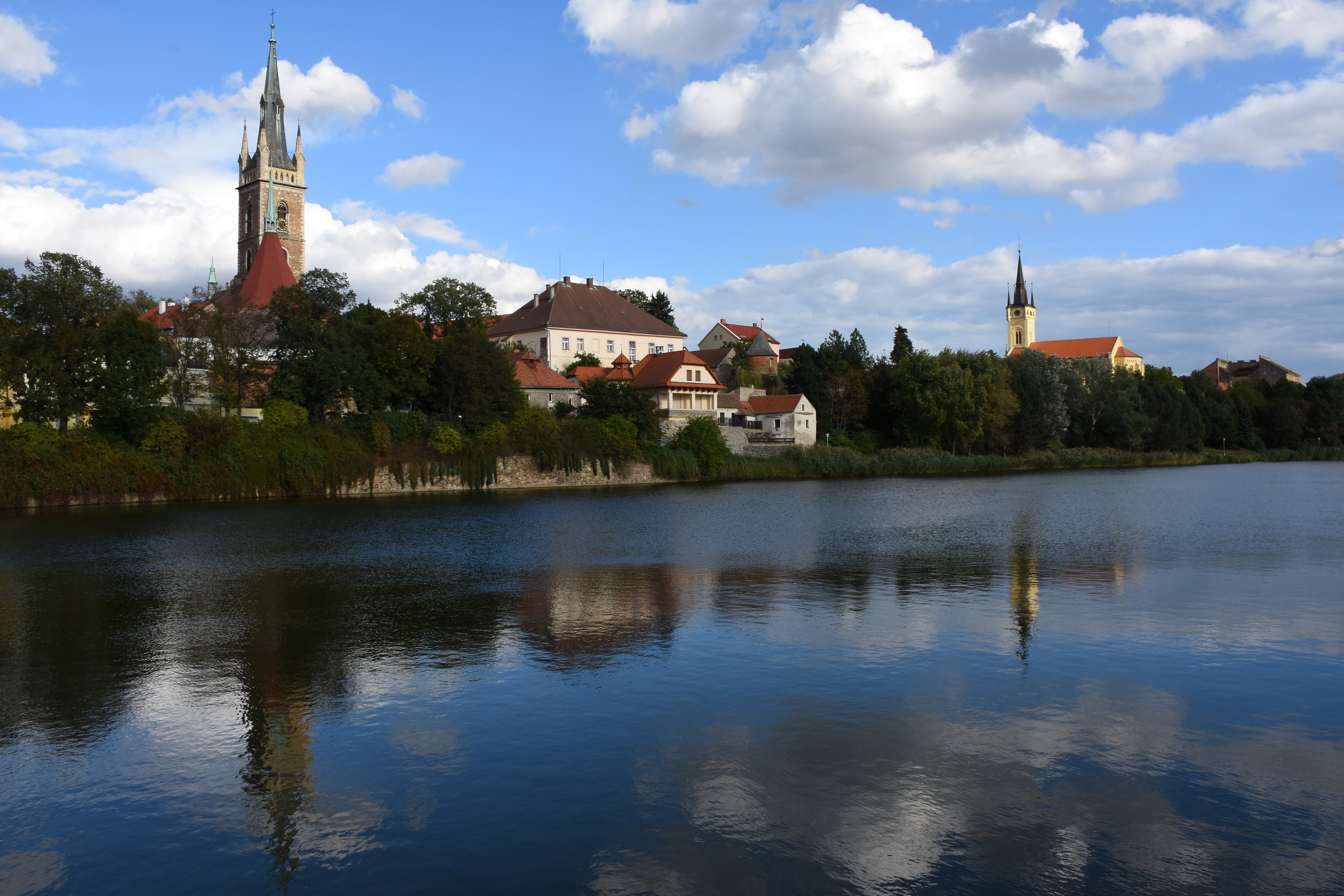
Old Town across Podměstský rybník

To the northeast of the town, there is an active air base of the Czech Air Force, called the 21st Tactical Air Force Base, with the military Čáslav Airport. This base is responsible for protecting the airspace of the Czech Republic.

== Transport ==
Čáslav is located on the interregional railway line Prague–Žďár nad Sázavou. It is also the starting point of a line of local importance to Třemošnice.

== Sport ==
The town's football club, FK Čáslav, plays in the lower amateur tiers. The club was founded in 1902 as SK STELLA (Hvězda) Čáslav. In 2006–2013, the club played in the Czech National Football League.

Notable is the Athletics Club Čáslav. Two of its most known sportswomen are Ludmila Formanová and Jarmila Kratochvílová, both natives of Čáslav that were world champions in 800 m sprint.

== Sights ==
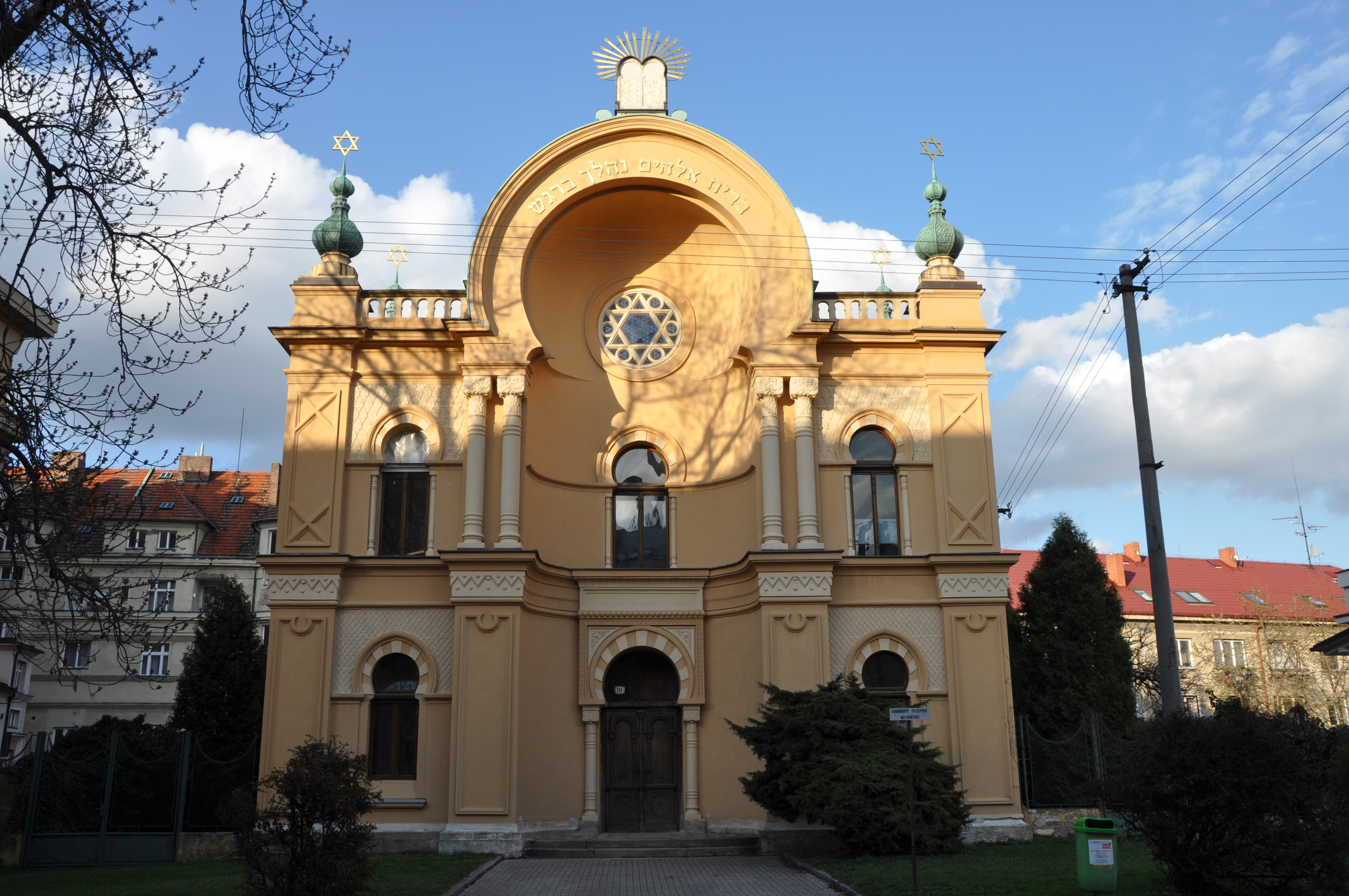
Synagogue

The main landmark of Čáslav is the Church of Saints Peter and Paul. A Romanesque church from the 12th century dedicated to St. Michael originally stood in its place. At the end of the 13th century, it was completely rebuilt in the early Gothic style. However, part of the old church was incorporated into the new church as the sacristy and has remained preserved to this day. In the 14th and 15th centuries, the church was further expanded. The Renaissance reconstruction took place in 1537–1539. The church tower was rebuilt many times due to frequent fires. In 1908–1911, the church was renovated by the architect Kamil Hilbert and cleaned of newer modifications. It is considered one of the most successful works of this architect.

The town area was delimited by walls, which are preserved in one third of their original length. A unique monument of the Čáslav Gothic fortifications is the cylindrical Otakar's Tower, which stood at the Brod Gate.

Čáslav Town Museum was founded in 1864, which makes it one of the oldest regional museums in Bohemia. The museum building dates from 1884.

The synagogue was built between 1899 and 1900 in Moorish style, designed by architect Wilhelm Stiassny. It was used until 1939 by the local Jewish community, which was then almost totally wiped out during the Holocaust. After World War II, the abandoned building was used as a warehouse, and then (between 1970 and 1989) as an art gallery. In 1994, however, it was returned to the Jewish Community in Prague and has recently been restored.

In 1910, part of the skull of the Hussite general Jan Žižka was discovered in Čáslav parish church. The skull is exhibited in Žižka's Hall of Čáslav Town Hall.

== Notable people ==
- Jan Ladislav Dussek (1760–1812), composer and pianist
- František Josef Dusík (1765 – after 1816), composer and instrumentalist
- Antonín Chittussi (1847–1891), Impressionist painter
- Rudolf Těsnohlídek (1882–1928), writer
- Jiří Mahen (1882–1939), writer
- Jaroslav Eminger (1886–1964), military officer
- František Moravec (1895–1966), military intelligence officer
- Zdeněk Špinar (1916–1995), paleontologist
- Josef Svoboda (1920–2002), scenographer
- Eli Urbanová (1922–2012), poet, novelist and Esperantist
- Antonín Rükl (1932–2016), astronomer
- Miloš Forman (1932–2018), film director
- Aleš Veselý (1935–2015), sculptor and graphic artist
- Jarmila Kratochvílová (born 1951), athlete
- Ludmila Formanová (born 1974), athlete
- David Jarolím (born 1979), footballer

== Twin towns – sister cities ==
Čáslav is twinned with:

- Opfikon, Switzerland
