= Olivia Buckley =

English harpist, organist and composer

Olivia Francisca Buckley née Dussek (1799–1847) was an English harpist, organist and composer. She was born in London, the daughter of Czech composer Jan Ladislav Dussek and Scottish composer Sophia Corri. Dussek left his wife, and Olivia was taught the harp and piano by her mother, making her debut at the age of eight at the Argyle Rooms. She married Richard William Buckley and had ten children.

Buckley taught music, and around 1840 became organist at Kensington parish church. She used the pen name O. B. Dussek for the publication of her music.

== Works ==
Buckley composed for harp and vocal works. Selected compositions include:

- The third Royal Infant opera, composed for Their Royal Highnesses Prince Alfred & Princess Alice
- The Harpist's Friend, collection
- Fairy Songs and Ballads for the Young, collection
