= František Josef Dusík =

František Josef Benedikt Dusík (known in Italy as Cormundi; German: Franz Joseph Benedikt Dussek; 22 March 1765 – after 1816) was a Czech instrumentalist and composer.

== Life ==
Dusík was born on 22 March 1765 in Čáslav. He came from a large musical family. His father was the cantor and composer Jan Josef Dusík from Čáslav and his older brother was the famous piano virtuoso (and also composer) Jan Ladislav Dussek. His mother Veronika née Štěbetová was also a good harpist and singer. He learned to play the piano, violin and cello from childhood and often replaced his father at the organ.

In 1782 he was accepted into the foundation of the monastery in Žďár nad Sázavou. He continued his studies in Prague, where he was a pupil of Augustin Šenkýř and during his studies he became an organist at the Benedictine Emmaus Monastery in Prague.

After his studies, he was accepted into the service of Count Lützow, with whose support he went to Italy. He worked as a concertmaster in Mortara, at the S. Benedetto Theatre in Venice and in 1786 at the opera house of La Scala, Milan. From 1790 he was a military bandmaster in Ljubljana and Venice. He also married in Ljubljana. His wife was Anna Fokke, whose brother was an official of the Control Office in Stična.

The circumstances of the last years of his life are not clear. It is known that he was an organist in Ljubljana and it is believed that he died sometime after 1816, in or near Stična in Slovenia (in the vicinity of the village of Ivančna Gorica).

== Compositions ==
=== Operas ===
List of operas written by him:

- Sultan Wampum (premièred 26 December 1796, Ljubljana)
- Eugen der zweyte oder Der Held unserer Zeit (prem. 7 November 1797, Ljubljana)
- Die Lederers Tochter oder Der weibliche Kadet (prem. 1800, Ljubljana)
- La caffeteria di spirito (The spirit cafe)
- La ferita mortale (The mortal wound)
- La feudataria (performed 14 August 1806, Milan, La Scala) [ 3 ] Stanford
- Il fortunato successo (Il felice successo) (prem. Carnival 1810, Pavia)
- L'impostore (performed at the Teatro di Brescia, 1806)
- L'incatesimo senza magia (The spell without magic)
- Matrimonio e divorzio in sol giorno ossia Angiolina
- Voglia di dote e non di moglie
- Ombra ossia il ravvedimento (comic opera, prem. 22 February 1816, Venice)
- Roma salvata (opera seria, prem. 4 June 1816, Venice)

=== Other works ===
- Gerusalemme distrutta (oratorio)
- Sinfonia

The Czech Museum of Music houses:

- Trio in G major for three flutes (Allegro-Menuetto-Rondo)
- Trio in D minor (Adagio-Romance-Rondo)
- Serenata for Two Violins, 2 Oboes (Clarinets), 2 French horns, Violoncello and Basso
