= Piano Sonata No. 18 (Dussek) =

Piano sonata composed by Jan Ladislav Dussek

- by Jan Ladislav Dussek
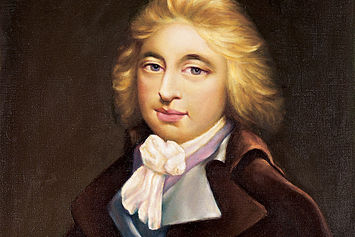
- Dussek at an unknown date
- Key: E♭ major
- Opus: 81
- Composed: 1800
- Dedication: Muzio Clementi
- Published: 1800
- Publisher: Sieber
- Duration: 30 minutes
- Movements: 4
- Scoring: piano

Jan Ladislav Dussek's Piano Sonata No. 18 in E♭ major, Op. 44, known as Les Adieux ("The Farewell"), was written and published in 1800. It was dedicated to Dussek's fellow composer and virtuoso pianist, Muzio Clementi. This sonata is the longest of Dussek's piano sonatas. This sonata had a major influence on Ludwig van Beethoven's sonata with the same nickname.

== Structure ==
The sonata has four movements:

1. Introduzione: Grave - Allegro moderato
2. Molto adagio e sostenuto (in B major)
3. Tempo di minuetto più tosto allegro (Minuet in G♯ minor and Trio in A♭ major)
4. Rondo. Allegro moderato ed espressivo

The first movement is in sonata form with an introduction. It starts with a slow introduction in E♭ minor, which the English music journalist Ebenezer Prout says that "we meet the organist Dussek...the sustained harmonies and suspensions which abound in the music being quite appropriate for the 'king of instruments.' The Allegro after the introduction is in 6/8 time.

The second movement, marked Molto adagio e sostenuto, is in B major and 2/4 time. This movement is very harmonically advanced for its time, prefiguring the works of piano composers such as Chopin, Liszt, and Alkan and "must have greatly astonished the musical public..."

The third movement is in minuet and trio form in 3/4 time. The minuet is in G♯ minor and the trio is in A♭ major.

The fourth and last movement is in rondo form and returns to the sonata's home key of E♭ major. Prout says that "this movement must rank as among the very best of its author's works."

== Relation to Beethoven's Sonata ==
The pianist Frederick Marvin said that "The work actually could have been a model for the Les Adieux Sonata by Beethoven ten years later." Marvin further points out the similarities in motives and form in Beethoven's sonata to Dussek's.
