= Piano Sonata No. 28 (Dussek) =

Piano sonata composed by Jan Ladislav Dussek

- by Jan Ladislav Dussek
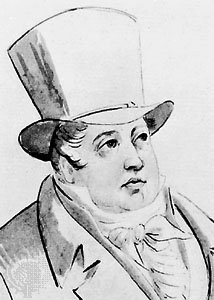
- Dussek in the last years of his life.
- Key: F minor
- Opus: 77
- Composed: 1812
- Dedication: Mlle Betsy Ouvrard
- Published: 1812
- Publisher: Naderman
- Duration: 23–25 minutes
- Movements: 4
- Scoring: piano

Jan Ladislav Dussek's Piano Sonata No. 28 in F minor, Op. 77, known as "L'Invocation" ("The Summoning"), was written and published in 1812. This was the last major work that Dussek wrote.

== Structure ==
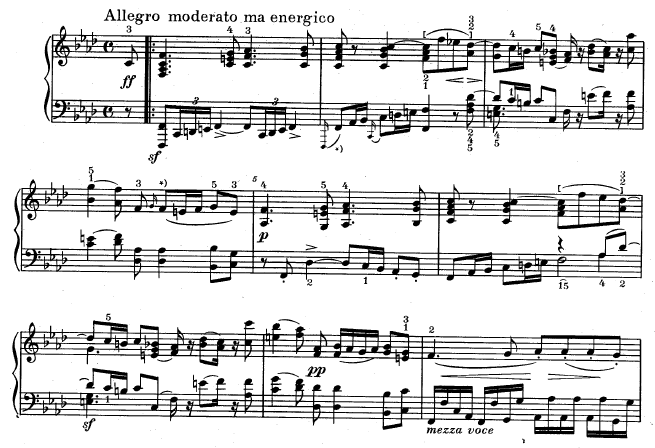
The first nine measures of the first movement

This sonata has four movements:

1. Allegro moderato ma energico
2. Tempo di minuetto con moto. Canone alla seconda (Trio in F major)
3. Adagio non troppo ma solenne (in D♭ major)
4. Rondo. Allegro moderato

The first movement is in sonata form. The English music journalist, Ebenezer Prout, says that this movement is "distinguished by the dignified grace of its melodies, and by the brilliance of its passage work."

The second movement is in minuet and trio form in 3/4 time. The minuet is a canon in F minor and the trio is in F major.

The third movement, marked Adagio non troppo ma solenne, is in D♭ major and 3/8 time.

The fourth and last movement is in rondo form and returns to the sonata's home key of F minor.
