= Jan Ladislav Dussek =

Czech composer and pianist (1760–1812)

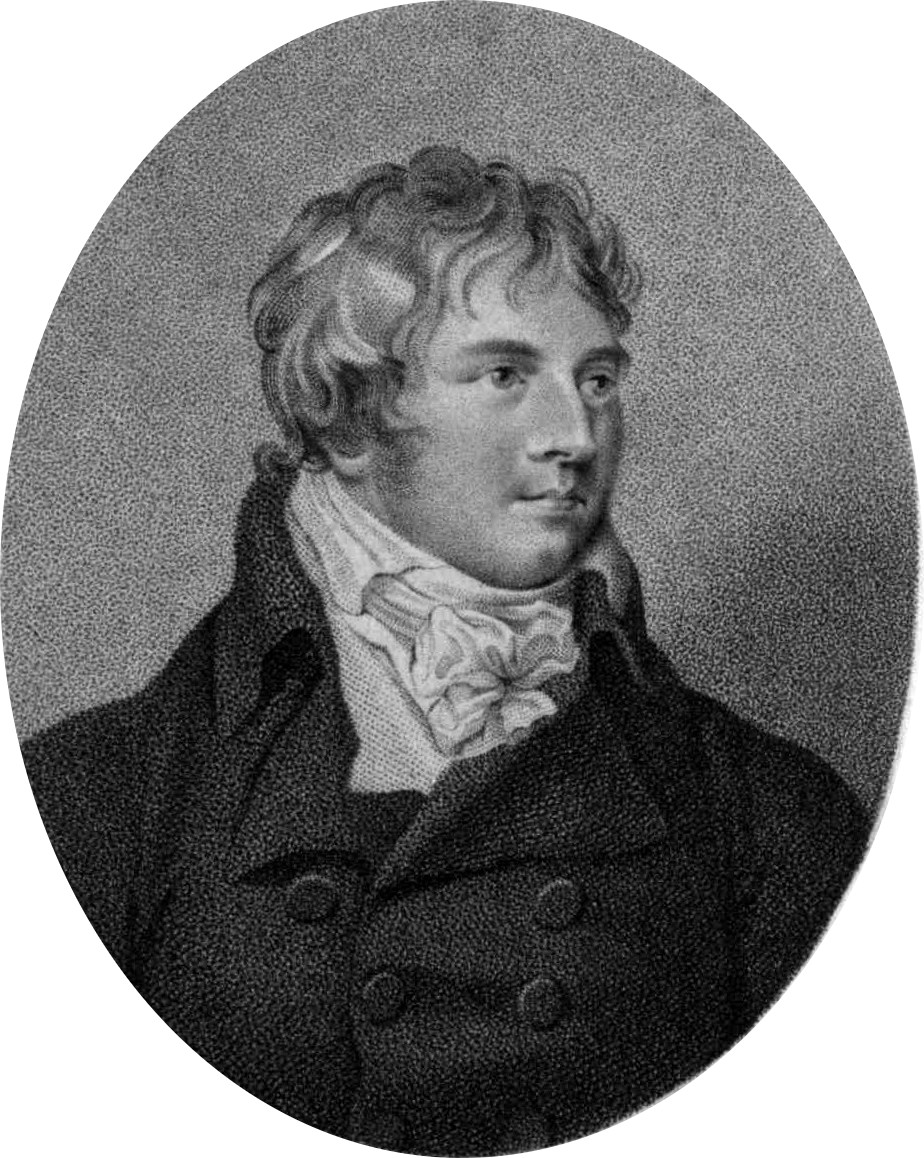
- Engraved portrait of Dussek, published in 1867
- Born: 12 February 1760; Čáslav, Bohemia, Holy Roman Empire
- Died: 20 March 1812 (aged 52); Saint-Germain-en-Laye, Napoleonic France
- Era: Classical
- Spouse: Sophia Dussek (m. 1792)
- Children: Olivia Buckley

Jan Ladislav Dussek (baptised Jan Václav Dusík, with surname also written as Duschek or Düssek; 12 February 1760 – 20 March 1812) was a Czech classical period composer and virtuoso pianist. He was an important representative of Czech music abroad in the second half of the 18th century and the beginning of the 19th century. Some of his more forward-looking piano works have traits often associated with Romanticism.

Dussek was one of the first piano virtuosos to travel widely throughout Europe. He performed at courts and concert venues from London to Saint Petersburg to Milan, and was celebrated for his technical prowess. During a nearly ten-year stay in London, he was instrumental (sic) in extending the size of the pianoforte, and was the recipient of one of John Broadwood's first 6-octave pianos, CC-c4. Harold Schonberg wrote that he was the first pianist to sit at the piano with his profile to the audience, earning him the appellation "le beau visage." All subsequent pianists have sat on stage in this manner. He was one of the best-regarded pianists in Europe before Beethoven's rise to prominence.

His music is marked by lyricism interrupted by sudden dynamic contrasts. As well as his many compositions for the piano, he also composed for the harp: his music for that instrument contains a great variety of figuration within a largely diatonic harmony, avoids chromatic passages. His music is considered standard repertoire for all harpists, particularly his Six Sonatas/Sonatinas and especially the Sonata in C minor. Less well known to the general public than that of his more renowned Classical period contemporaries, his piano music is highly valued by many teachers and not infrequently programmed. Franz Liszt has been called an indirect successor of Dussek in the composition and performance of virtuoso piano music. His music remained popular to some degree in 19th-century Great Britain and the USA, some still in print, with more available in period editions online.

== Life ==
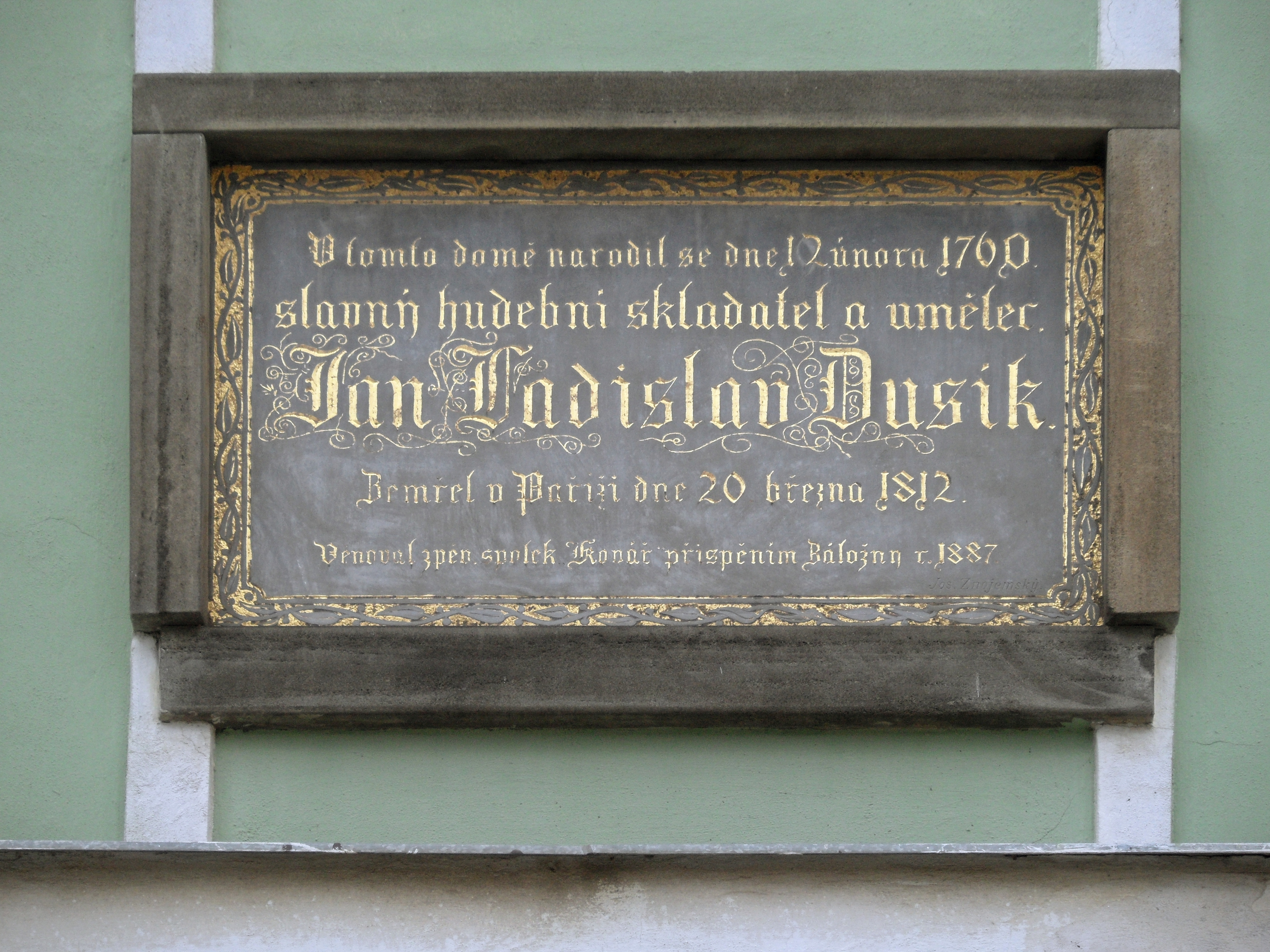
Memorial plaque in Čáslav, his birthplace

=== Early years ===
The Dussek family had a long history as professional musicians, starting at least as early as Jan Ladislav's grandfather Jan Josef Dusík (b. 1712), and lasting in the Moravian branch of the family at least into the 1970s. Jan Ladislav's mother, Veronika Dusíková (née Štěbetová), played the harp, an instrument, along with the piano, for which her son went on to write much music. His father, Jan Josef, was also a well-known organist and composer. His sister, Kateřina Veronika Anna Dusíkova, was also a musician and composer.

Jan Ladislav, the oldest of three children, was born on 12 February 1760 in the Bohemian town of Čáslav, where his father taught and played the organ. His first musical instruction came from his father, who began teaching him piano at 5, and organ at age 9. His voice was also found to be good, so he also sang in the church choir.

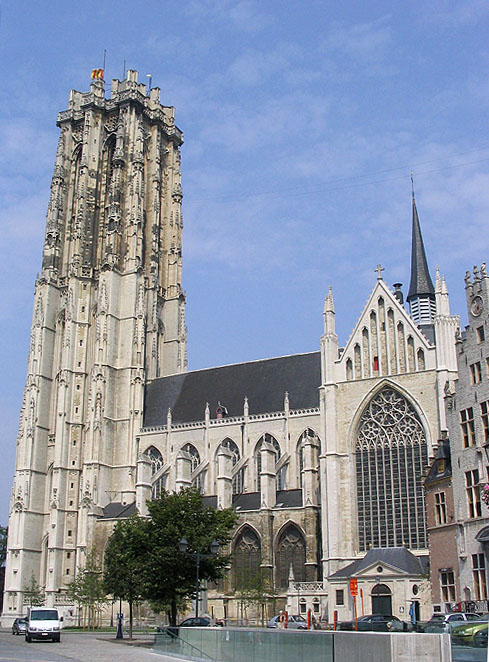
St. Rumbold's Cathedral in Mechelen

He studied music at the Jesuit gymnasium in Jihlava, where he studied with Ladislav Špinar, its choir director; his grades were reported to be poor. From 1774 to 1776 he studied at the Jesuit gymnasium in Kutná Hora, where he also served as organist in the Santa Barbara Jesuit church. In 1776 he went to the New City Gymnasium in Prague, where he was again reported to be a lazy student. In 1777 he enrolled in the University of Prague, where he lasted one semester.

=== Netherlands and Hamburg ===
After these early studies in Bohemia he entered the services of one Captain Männer, an Austrian military man, in 1778. Dussek traveled with the Captain to what has since become Belgium in 1779, where he was - by some sources - appointed organist at St. Rumbold's cathedral in Mechelen. Georges Van Doorslaer, a well acclaimed musicologist from Mechelen, studied the question in 1911 and refutes that claim: Dusseks name is never mentioned in the city's expense records (i.e. he did not receive payment for the commission), and the position at St. Rumbold's was not vacant at the time of Dusseks stay in Mechelen. However, he did perform there: he gave a harpsichord recital in the Kleerkoper's Hall (Botermarkt) on December 16, 1779. He then travelled to the Dutch Republic, where a well-received concert in Amsterdam brought him to the royalty's attention. He was invited to The Hague, where he gave lessons to the three children of Stadtholder William V. While at the Hague he gave a performance before Kaiser Joseph II of Austria, who acknowledged Dussek's prowess.

By 1782, after leaving Männer's service, he was in Hamburg, where he gave a concert on the "new English fortepiano". While in Hamburg, he may have studied with C. P. E. Bach. He also published his first works, three piano concertos and 3 violin sonatas (C 2–7), all of which were assigned Opus 1.

=== Eastern and Central Europe ===
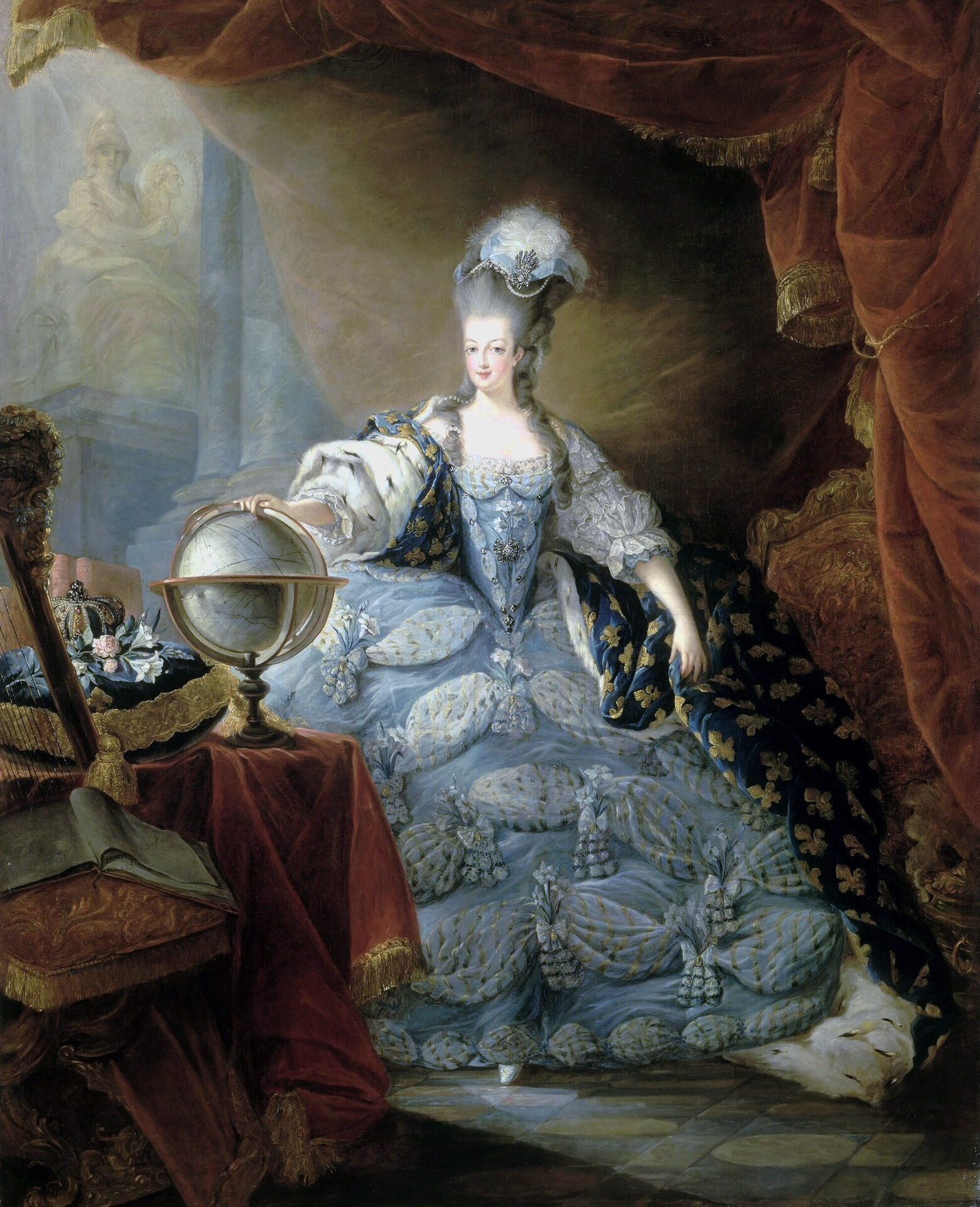
Marie Antoinette was one of Dussek's patrons.

From Hamburg he moved to Saint Petersburg, where he was a favorite of Catherine the Great. While there he was introduced to a technician named Hessel, who had developed a keyboard version of the glass harmonica, an instrument Dussek went on to master. Dussek was forced to leave Russia quite abruptly, just ahead of Catherine's secret police, amid suspicions of his involvement in a plot to assassinate Catherine. In a possibly apocryphal tale surrounding his departure, he was en route to play for Catherine when he found a ring, which he put on. Catherine recognized the ring as belonging to a known conspirator, raising her suspicions about Dussek.

After Dussek left Saint Petersburg, he took a position as music director for Prince Antoni Radziwiłł in Lithuania, where he stayed about a year. His departure from Lithuania may have been prompted by an affair he was rumored to have with the Prince's wife, the Princess of Thurn und Taxis. He toured Germany for the next few years as a virtuoso performer on the piano and on the glass harmonica, eventually arriving in Paris in 1786. The German tour was a significant success for him. One review of a Berlin concert said, "He obtained great distinction as a pianist, and was little less admired for his playing on the [glass] harmonica ... some critics pretend to trace to his skill upon this instrument many of his specialities of style both as a pianist and composer". Another reviewer wrote, of a concert in Kassel, "He entranced all listeners with a slow, harmonic, and studiously modulated prelude and chorale." He may also have been in Ludwigslust in 1786, where he would have performed his Extract from an Easter Canata (C 26) for the Duke of Mecklenburg-Schwerin.

=== France and Italy ===
In Paris Dussek became a favorite of Marie Antoinette, who tried to dissuade him from going on a performing tour to Milan in 1788. However, she was unsuccessful, as Dussek wanted to visit his brother František in Milan. Dussek's trip to Milan was quite successful; his performances "produce[d] quite a sensation". He returned to Paris, where he stayed until shortly before the outbreak of the Revolution in 1789. There he published a series of violin sonatas (C 27–29) dedicated to Eugénie de Beaumarchais, daughter of writer Pierre Beaumarchais.

=== London ===
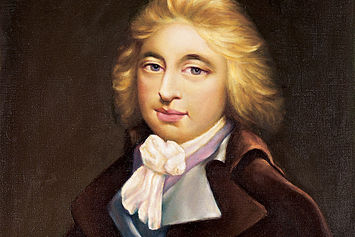
Portrait of Dussek (unknown date and author)

Dussek left France for England in May or June 1789, where he settled in London. It is sometimes alleged that he took with him the harpist wife of the composer Jean-Baptiste Krumpholtz, who drowned himself in the Seine as a consequence; however, this is likely untrue, as Anne-Marie Krumpholtz went to London in 1788. It is also uncertain whether he left Paris because of the looming crisis in France, or if it was merely coincidental. Early biographers have generally claimed that he left because of the impending revolution. He is reported to have had a concert engagement in London in early June 1789; this would have required his departure from Paris before some of the critical steps early in the Revolution.

Dussek made London his home until 1799. By 1790 he was well established as a performer and teacher. He was in such demand that Davison, in an 1860 biographic sketch, noted that "he became one of the most fashionable professors of the day, and his lessons were both sought with avidity and remunerated at a rate of payment which knew no precedent except in the instance of John Cramer." He had also established a relationship with pianomaker John Broadwood, taking delivery of one of the first 5½ octave pianos (FF-c4): Broadwood noted in his business journal for 13 November 1793: "We have made some 5 ½ octave grands these three years past, the first to please Dussek, which being liked, Cramer junior had one". His collaboration with Broadwood would continue to bear fruit when, in 1794, he also received the first 6-octave (CC-c4) piano

I am happy to inform you that you have an upstanding, polite, and musically gifted son. I love him as you do, as he has earned it. Give him your blessing, so that he will be always happy, something that I wish for him, given his great talents.

— Joseph Haydn, in a letter to Dussek's father, 26 February 1792

In the spring of 1791, Dussek appeared in a series of concerts, a number of which featured Sophia, the young daughter of music publisher Domenico Corri. In a concert on 15 June that year, the pair played a piano duet together; they were married in September 1792. Sophia Corri was a singer, pianist, and harpist who became known in her own right. They had a daughter, Olivia, but the marriage was not happy, involving liaisons by both parties.

Some of the concerts in 1791 and 1792 featured both Dussek and Joseph Haydn; the older Haydn wrote quite favorably of Dussek in a letter to the latter's father following one of the 1792 concerts. The other highlights of 1792 (above and beyond his marriage to Sophia) included the beginning of a music publishing venture with Sophia's father Domenico. This business, while successful at first, fared poorly in later years, and the circumstances of its failure spurred Dussek to leave London in 1799, leaving Corri in debtors' prison.

Dussek's business venture apparently had little impact on his performing and composing while in London. Every year, he performed in a series of concerts, at least some of which also featured Sophia, and which frequently featured new works. Some works were so successful they were repeated at later concerts in the series. Of one work, a reviewer wrote in 1798, "Dussek's Military Concerto was repeated. We think it very deserving of encomium." The concerto (C 153), which the reviewer reported as having been a repeat performance, was played again the following week.

In 1796, Dussek and his wife began having serious marital troubles. In an account of uncertain veracity, it was reported that Sophia, who had fallen in love with another man, asked Dussek for money to repair her harp. She then used the money to leave the house, removing her belongings in her harp case, and claiming to have left for dinner with a female friend. A suspicious Dussek went with his father-in-law to the man's house, where Sophia locked herself in. She and Dussek argued, and she cursed him, claiming to be pregnant by the other man. Dussek, relenting, promised her freedom to do what she wanted; this led to a reconciliation of sorts. It seems unlikely that Dussek ever saw Sophia and his daughter Olivia after he left London in 1799; Sophia had to wait until she knew Dussek had died before she could remarry, which she did in 1812.

Some of Dussek's compositions included arrangements of operatic and theatrical overtures for piano. He decided to try his hand at opera in 1798; the result was The Captive of Spilberg, with a libretto by Prince Hoare. The opera opened at Drury Lane on 14 November 1798, and the music was well received, with the European Magazine's critic writing, "the music, by Mr. Dussek, was such as to intitle him to rank with the first composers of the time."

Though the plot may be considered of a nature rather too gloomy for an after-piece, it possesses a considerable degree of interest ... Mr. Dussek, in the music which is entirely new, has displayed a complete knowledge of the principles of the art. ... The melody throughout is natural and the choruses are, without exception, as perfect specimens as we can find in the works of the theatrical composers of the present day. The overture ... was received with repeated plaudits.

— Review of The Captive of Spilberg in The Times

==== Business failure ====
In 1799, the business venture with Corri, which had never been very successful, ran into financial difficulties. Dussek and Corri managed to convince the librettist Lorenzo Da Ponte to lend them money to cover their debts. The failure to repay this debt put Corri into Newgate Prison and caused Dussek to flee. Da Ponte believed that Dussek fled to Paris; in fact he returned to Hamburg. The affair ended up bankrupting both Corri and Da Ponte.

Dussek then toured Germany, where he became one of the first "glamour" pianists, preceding Franz Liszt. According to Louis Spohr, Dussek was the first to turn the piano sideways on the stage "so that the ladies could admire his handsome profile." Before long he took up a position with Prince Louis Ferdinand of Prussia, who treated him more as a friend and colleague than as an employee. Together, they sometimes enjoyed what were called "musical orgies." When Prince Louis Ferdinand was killed in the Battle of Saalfeld, Dussek wrote the moving Sonata in F sharp minor, Elégie harmonique, Op. 61 (C 211).

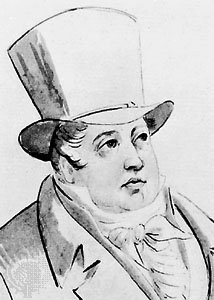
Jan Ladislav Dussek, detail of a drawing by Pierre Condé

=== Later years ===
In 1807, despite his earlier affiliation with Marie Antoinette, Dussek returned to Paris in the employ of Talleyrand, the powerful French foreign minister. Having no doubt made the acquaintance of Sébastien Érard in London, he became closely associated with the Érard brothers' piano-making activities, signing an Érard grand piano of 1808 still to be seen at Talleyrand's château at Valençay, and giving the first public performance on their new stirrup-action grand in 1810. He wrote a powerful sonata (Sonata in A♭ major, Op. 64, C 221) called Le Retour à Paris (The Return to Paris). This imposing sonata also received the nickname Plus Ultra in heated response to a piano sonata by Joseph Woelfl, said to be the last word in pianistic difficulties, entitled Non Plus Ultra. The remainder of his life he spent performing, teaching and composing in Prussia and France. His personal beauty had faded and he became grossly fat. He also developed a fondness for strong drink which probably hastened his death. Dussek died of gout on 20 March 1812, in Saint-Germain-en-Laye.

== Style ==
Dussek was a predecessor of the Romantic composers for piano, especially Chopin, Schumann and Mendelssohn. Many of his works are strikingly at odds with the prevailing late Classical style of other composers of the time like Beethoven, Hummel, and Schubert. The evolution of style found in Dussek's piano writing suggests he pursued an independent line of development, one that anticipated but did not influence early Romanticism.

His more notable works include several large-scale solo piano pieces, piano sonatas, many piano concertos, sonatas for violin and piano, a musical drama, and various works of chamber music, including a Trio for piano, horn and violin, and the highly unusual sonata for piano, violin, cello and percussion entitled The Naval Battle and Total Defeat of the Dutch by Admiral Duncan (1797, C 152), which is an extremely rare example of pre-20th-century chamber music that includes percussion.

=== Solo piano works ===
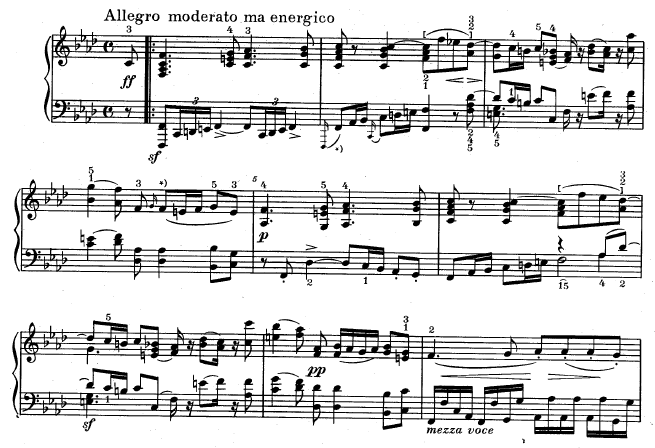
The opening of Dussek's Grand Sonata in F minor, Op. 77.

Dussek was one of a number of foreign-born composers, including Muzio Clementi and John Field, who contributed significantly to the development of a distinct "London" school of pianoforte composition. In part, this was due to the particular nature of piano manufacture in England. Joseph Haydn, for instance, composed his famous E♭ sonata after playing a piano of greater range lent to him by Dussek. Much of Dussek's piano writing drew upon the more modulable and powerful tonal qualities and greater keyboard range of English-manufactured pianofortes. The enhanced possibilities offered by the instrument help explain some of his stylistic innovations.

Dussek wrote numerous solo piano works, including 34 Piano Sonatas as well as a number of programmatic compositions. His The Sufferings of the Queen of France (composed in 1793, C 98), for example, is an episodic account of Marie Antoinette with interpolated texts relating to the Queen's misfortunes, including her sorrow at being separated from her children and her final moments on the scaffold before the guillotine.

Along with Clementi, Dussek may have been a source of stylistic inspiration and influence for Beethoven, whose expansion upon the idiomatic innovations of the London school led to their rapid penumbration with the appearance of Beethoven's own keyboard works. Stylistic, melodic, dynamic and even structural similarities have been observed, for instance, between Beethoven's Sonata Opus 10, No. 3 and Dussek's Sonatas Opus 31, No. 2 and Opus 35, No. 2. Similarly, the opening of Beethoven's Sonata Opus 10, No. 1 quotes directly Dussek's Sonata Opus 39, No. 3 (see image).

It is also possible that Dussek's influence can be seen in Beethoven's famous Sonata Opus 81a, les Adieux: "both the program and the realization owed a great deal to Dussek's The Farewell, Opus 44."

=== Piano concertos ===
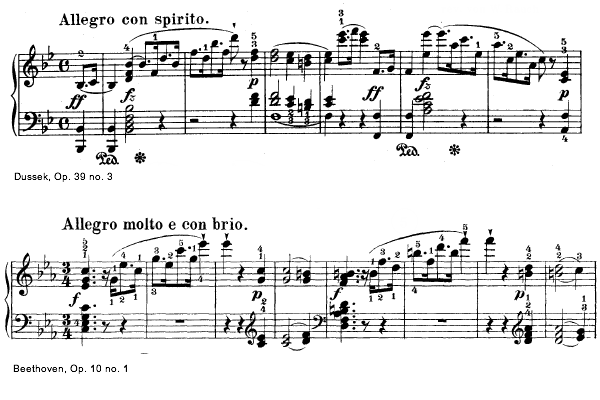
The opening of Dussek's Sonata Opus 39/3 and Beethoven's Opus 10/1.

Dussek composed a number of piano concertos between 1779 and 1810, eighteen of which survive. Dussek introduced one noteworthy stylistic innovation to the piano concerto form. In variance with the prevailing classical concerto style, exemplified by Mozart's piano concertos, Dussek eliminated the soloist cadenza in the opening movement in all of his concertos written after 1792.

Other individual characteristics are also noteworthy. His Concerto in C major, Op. 29, published in 1795, starts with an introductory Larghetto in 3/8 time, a solemn thematic declamation that is unique to the classical concerto. His last surviving work in the genre, Opus 70 in E♭ major, was one of the first to lengthen substantially the opening movement: at 570 measures long, it is roughly a third longer than his previous contributions, and foreshadows the practice of a dominant opening movement in concerto writing, found, for example, in the concertos of Chopin and the two minor concerti Opus 85 and Opus 89 by Johann Nepomuk Hummel as well as Beethoven's fifth.

== Innovations to the piano ==
Apart from his own music, Dussek is important in the history of music because of his friendship with John Broadwood, the developer of the "English Action" piano. Because his own music demanded strength and range not available in the then current pianos, he pushed Broadwood into several extensions of the range and sonority of the instrument. It was a Broadwood instrument with Dussek's improvements that was sent to Beethoven.

Dussek was also the first composer to write indications for using piano pedals.

== Works list ==
The vast majority of Dussek's music involves the piano or harp in some way. He wrote 35 sonatas for piano and 11 for piano duet, as well as numerous other works for both configurations. His chamber music output includes 65 violin sonatas, 24 piano (or harp) trios, and a variety of works for harp, harp or piano, or harp and piano. Some sonatas had trio parts added by J. B. Cramer. Orchestral works were limited to concertos, including 16 for piano (one of them is lost and two of them of dubious attribution), six for harp (three of them lost), and one for two pianos. He wrote a modest number of vocal works, include 12 songs, a cantata, a mass, and one opera, The Captive of Spilberg. His compositions also included arrangements of other works, especially opera overtures, for piano.

Cataloging Dussek's compositions has a history of its own. Dussek's oeuvre has historically been difficult to organize, due in part to the number of publishers who originally published his work, and to the fact that some of his works were published by more than one publisher. Some works published by multiple publishers were assigned different opus numbers; sometimes different works were given the same opus number by different publishers. Dussek further complicated this by arranging works for different instrument combinations.

The Artaria Company published a thematic catalog of his works that is incomplete, prompting Howard Craw to develop a new thematic catalog in 1964. Works are numbered in the order they were written prefixed by "C" or "Craw"; works of dubious origin are listed in a separately numbered section prefixed by "Craw D".

== Theoretical works ==
- Dussek's Instructions on the Art of Playing the Pianoforte or Harpsichord (London, Corri c. 1796)
- Kleine theoretisch-praktische Klavierschule von Pleyel, Dussek und Cramer (Vienna, Haslinger, undated)
- Méthode pour le Piano Contenant tous les principes généraux du Doigté, 24 Leçons faciles et graduées des Exercices progressifs ainsi que des passages difficiles, terminée par une Fantaisie et Fugue composée Par I.L. Dussek (Paris, undated)
- Dodici lezzioni progress. con arie caratteristiche di diff. nazioni (autograph in the library of the Conservatory in Florence)

== Selected discography ==
- J. L. Dussek: Violin Sonatas Vol. 1, 2, 3, Julia Huber (violin), Miriam Altmann (fortepiano), Brilliant Classics (to be continued).
- Dussek, Jan Ladislav & Sophia: Harp sonatas by Kyunghee Kim-Sutre (Sonarti records, 2013, RT01)
- J.L. Dussek: Sonatas for Harp and Fortepiano by Kyunghee Kim-Sutre and Laure Colladant (Mandala, 1995, MAN4854)
