= Ludwig van Beethoven (disambiguation) =

Ludwig van Beethoven (1770–1827) was a German composer and pianist.

Ludwig van Beethoven may also refer to:

- Ludwig van Beethoven (1712–1773), German singer, music director, and grandfather of the composer
- Ludwig van Beethoven (Baerer), a series of sculptures in the United States
- Louis van Beethoven (film), a 2020 German film
