= Louis van Beethoven (film) =

- Directed by: Niki Stein
- Written by: Niki Stein
- Produced by: Ernst Ludwig Ganzert
- Starring: Tobias Moretti; Colin Pütz; Anselm Bresgott; Ulrich Noethen; Silke Bodenbender
- Cinematography: Arthur W. Ahrweiler
- Edited by: Jan Henrik Pusch
- Distributed by: Degeto, WDR, ORF
- Release date: December 2020
- Running time: 120 minutes
- Countries: Germany, Czech Republic, Austria
- Language: German

Louis van Beethoven is a 2020 international co-production biographical film released at the 250th anniversary of Beethoven's birth. The movie shows the story of the world-famous composer from different perspectives. The title shows the name that was used in his youth.

== Plot ==
The film moves back and forth between Beethoven's final year and his early life in Bonn. The Beethoven we meet as an adult (Tobias Moretti) has long been deaf. He has come to his brother Johann's home in Gneixendorf along with their nephew Karl (Peter Lewys Preston) after Karl's attempted suicide. There Louis is in constant battle with everyone around him. This is the background that leads to memories of his earlier life.

As a child in Bonn, Louis (Colin Pütz) was a musical prodigy. He is pushed by his father, who has dreams of him being a new Mozart. Through his father's connections as a singer in the court of the Elector, the young Beethoven comes under the supervision of other musicians. He also comes in contact with Tobias Pfeiffer (Sabin Tambrea), a local actor who rooms with the family.

As he becomes a young man, Louis (Anselm Bresgott) continues to grow as a musician. He also suffers the loss of his mother, which sends his father into grief and alcoholism. He comes under the patronage of the von Breuning family and falls in love with Eleonore von Breuning (Caroline Hellwig). But he is below the family's social station and any match between them is forbidden. To recreate the atmosphere of Beethoven's era, it was decided to use a few replicas of period instruments made by a modern piano maker Paul McNulty.

== Cast ==
- Tobias Moretti - Ludwig van Beethoven
- Colin Pütz - Louis van Beethoven (8–12 years old)
- Anselm Bresgott - Louis van Beethoven (17–21 years old)
- Ulrich Noethen - Christian Gottlob Neefe
- Silke Bodenbender - Helene von Breuning
- Caroline Hellwig - Eleonore von Breuning (17–21 years old)
- Cornelius Obonya - Nikolaus Johann van Beethoven
- Johanna Gastdorf - Therese van Beethoven
- Ronald Kukulies - Johann van Beethoven
- Peter Lewys Preston - Karl van Beethoven
- Sabin Tambrea - Tobias Pfeiffer

== Release ==
The movie was released in Germany on 27 October 2020; in Spain on 4 December; in Russia on 19 December; and in the United States on 25 December. It was presented at the Sedona Film Festival in Arizona in May 2021.

== Reception ==
Neely Swanson, writing for the Los Angeles Times, stated that the movie "honors the struggles that gnawed at brilliance but is itself little more than an elegantly tailored time-filler", and feels like a "three-part miniseries crammed into one brisk viewing". The blogger Roger Moore praised the movie, calling the actors and setting "first rate, across the board". The blogger noted, however, that the movie was "almost entirely humorless, with precious little joy springing from the music". Clara Weiss, writing for the World Socialist Web Site, states that a viewer of the film would feel "contradictory feelings and, ultimately, disappointment and dissatisfaction", but despite this, that it will help people "engage more deeply with Beethoven and his epoch".
