= Colin Pütz =

German child prodigy (born 2007)

Colin Alexander Pütz (born 10 June 2007 in Bergisch Gladbach) is a German pianist. He also portrayed the young Ludwig Van Beethoven in 2020 TV Louis Van Beethoven. Pütz performed Beethoven's early works on historical instruments like clavichord, harpsichord, organ and fortepiano.

== Biography ==
Pütz says he began playing the piano at the age of five. Since October 2017, he has been enrolled as a junior student at the Pre College of the Cologne University of Music and Dance under Florence Millet. He won several awards at a young age, including multiple prizes in regional, state, and national competitions of ‘Jugend musiziert,’ the International Henle Piano Competition, the Westfälischer van Bremen Piano Competition, the International César Franck Piano Competition in Brussels, and the International Competition for Young Pianists Carl Maria von Weber in Dresden. One of his first public concert appearances was the Beethovenfest in Bonn, where he performed piano sonatas from 2015 to 2017.

His debut as a soloist with an orchestra took place on August 26, 2017, at the Erholungshaus in Leverkusen, performing Mozart’s 12th Piano Concerto in A major. Further regular performances with orchestras followed at the Spring Peak Concerts organized by the Rotary Clubs Köln-Kapitol and Köln-Kastell in cooperation with the Pre College Cologne since 2018. He played, among others, alongside the Neuen Philharmonie Westfalen, the WDR Symphony Orchestra, and the Bergische Symphoniker. In September 2020, Pütz performed as a pianist with the Beethoven Orchestra Bonn under Dirk Kaftan, playing three self-composed cadenzas in the Rondo in B-flat major, WoO 6, by Ludwig van Beethoven. In July 2022, Colin Pütz performed with the Jenaer Philharmonie at the closing concert of the 62nd Weimar Masterclasses.

In September 2021, he performed in Évian-les-Bains with the Orchestre National de France under the baton of Cristian Măcelaru, playing Frédéric Chopin’s Piano Concerto No. 2 in F minor. Then, in November 2022, he played Wolfgang Amadeus Mozart’s Piano Concerto No. 21 in C major, K. 467, alongside the Filarmonica George Enescu in Bucharest, also conducted by Măcelaru.

Colin Pütz had solo performances at the Festival Pro Constantia in Bad Honnef (broadcast on Deutschlandfunk Kultur), during the European Cultural Award ceremony, at Bonn's Beethovenfest, the Klavierfestival Ruhr, and in the Philharmonie Köln.
