= Franz Gerhard Wegeler =

German physician (1765–1848)

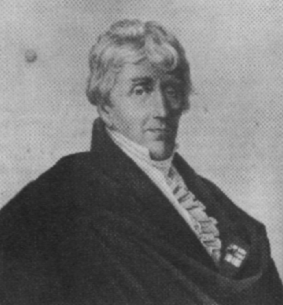
Franz Gerhard Wegeler

Franz Gerhard Wegeler (22 August 1765 – 7 May 1848) was a German medical doctor from Bonn, who, in his youth, was a close friend of composer Ludwig van Beethoven. He was the father of historian Julius Stephan Wegeler (1807-1883).

Wegeler studied medicine at the Universities of Bonn and Vienna. After completing his studies in Austria, he returned to Bonn, where he became a tenured professor of legal medicine and obstetrics in 1789. In 1794, he fled Bonn during the French Revolutionary Wars, returning to Vienna, where he renewed his friendship with Beethoven. After spending two years in Vienna, he again returned to Bonn as an instructor and a general practitioner of medicine.

In 1802, he married Eleonore von Breuning, the daughter of Helene von Breuning. Eleonore was a former piano student and 'first love' of Beethoven. The marriage produced four children. The descendants include Helena Josepha Theresia (1803–1832) and Julius Stephan Wegeler (1807–1883).

In 1807, Wegeler relocated to Koblenz, where he joined the Prussian civil service and received several prestigious awards.

Wegeler was a Freemason; Beethoven corresponded with him on the subject of Beethoven's music (not masonic music) being used in lodge ceremonies. Beethoven offered to compose a better piece than he had heard was being used.

A distinguished physician, Wegeler is remembered for his 1838 biography of Beethoven (Biographische Notizen über Ludwig van Beethoven), co-written with Beethoven's friend and pupil, composer Ferdinand Ries (1784–1838) and published eleven years after Beethoven's death. Historians consider these memoirs to be an important and reliable source of information regarding the early life of the great composer. According to this memoir, Wegeler and Beethoven first met when they were respectively aged 17 and 12, leading Andrew Crumey to suggest they were "brought together under Illuminist auspices – perhaps some educational event or programme to foster local talent."
