= Helene von Breuning =

German noblewoman (1750–1838)

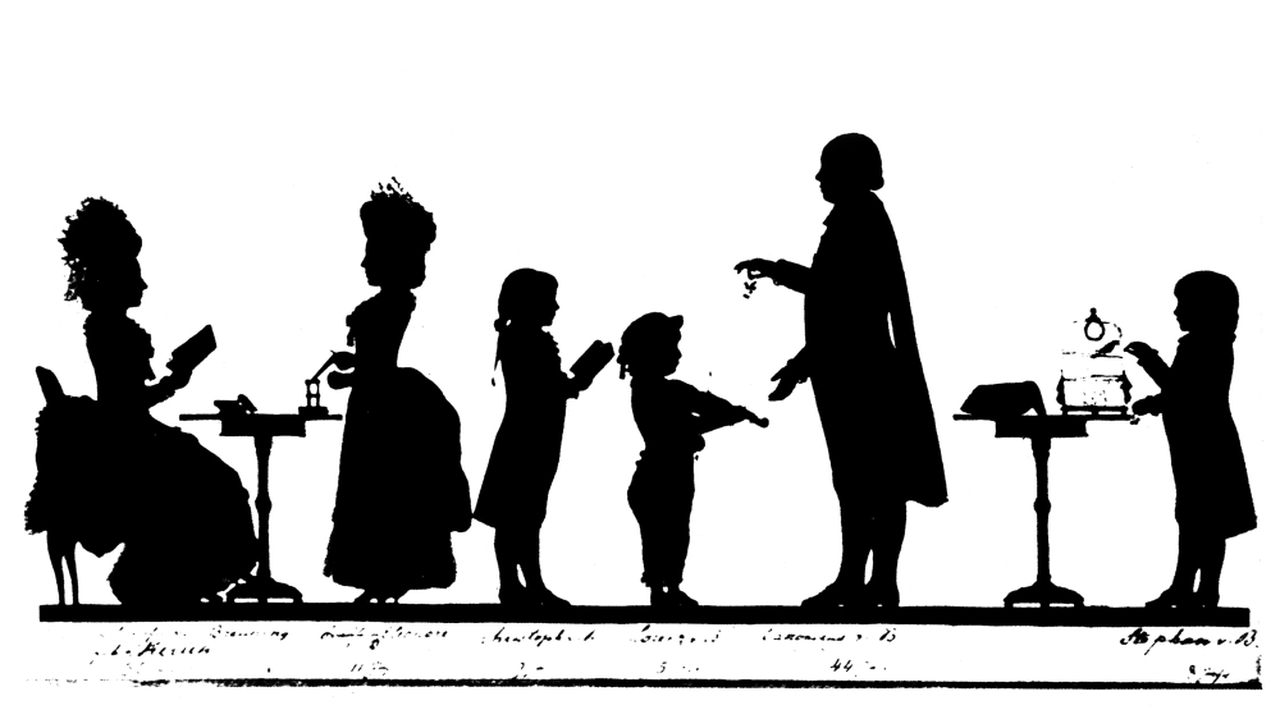
Helene von Breuning with her children: Eleonore (Beethoven's first love), Christoph, Lorenz, and Stephan (Beethoven's lifelong friend), plus her brother Abraham

Helene von Breuning (née von Kerich; 3 January 1750, Cologne – 9 December 1838) was a member of the Bonn upper class, who engaged young Ludwig van Beethoven to teach music to her children, helped him with his education and introduced him into social circles. Due to the close ties, she was later referred to as his "second mother" because she favourably shaped his early career.

== Life ==
Helene von Kerich was the daughter of Stephan von Kerich, privy councilor and personal physician to the last Archduke Maximilian Francis of Austria the Elector of Cologne. Her brother Abraham became a canon and Scholaster at the Archidiakonalstift zu Bonn. She married the Electoral Court Councilor Emanuel Joseph von Breuning (* 1741, † January 15, 1777 Bonn), who died trying to save files from the Electoral Palace fire in Bonn. With her four children, Christoph, Eleonore (nicknamed Lorchen), Stephan (Beethoven's lifelong friend) and Lorenz (nicknamed Lenz), the widowed Helene lived in Bonn until 1815 and later in Kerpen and Beul (Bad Neuenahr).

== Relationship with Beethoven ==
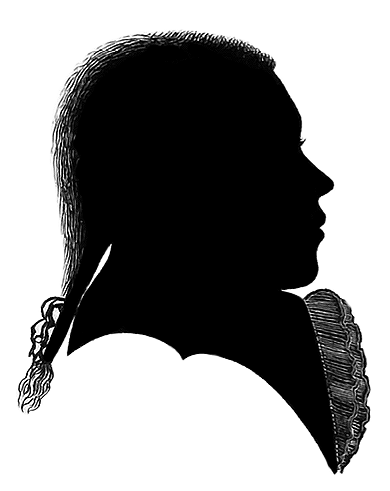
Silhouette image made of Beethoven when he was sixteen. He wears the uniform and wig suited to his employment as a court musician in Bonn

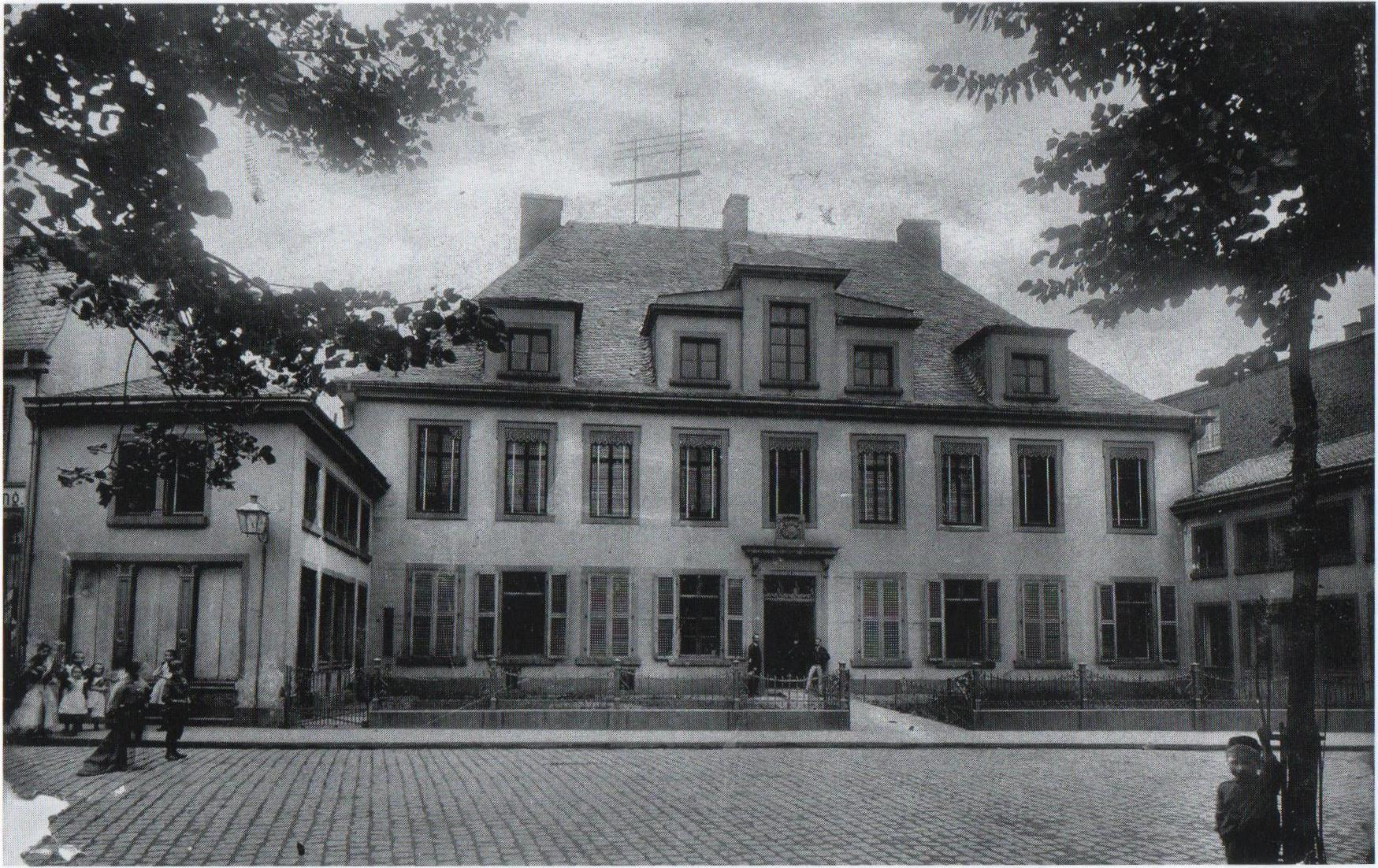
The former home of the v. Breuning family on Münsterplatz in Bonn, photographed around 1890

From 1785, when Beethoven was 14 years old, until 1792, when he left Bonn for Vienna permanently, the Breuning home on Bonn's Münsterplatz was a happy retreat for the young composer and pianist. Beethoven was employed as a piano teacher for the two youngest children, Lorchen and Lenz, who were two and seven years younger, respectively. Beethoven's dysfunctional home life during his childhood and adolescence was extremely unhappy and stressful and he was drawn to the warmth and closeness of the Breuning family. Helene was impressed by young Beethoven's talent, sensitivity and intelligence and she embraced him as one of her children. Beethoven visited the Breuning home almost daily; he often ate his meals there and was a frequent overnight guest. Lorchen was young Beethoven's first love, but she later married another long-time friend of Beethoven, Franz Gerhard Wegeler. Beethoven and Stephan Von Breuning, four years younger than the composer, remained close friends for the rest of their lives (Stephan died just two months following Beethoven's death in 1827). It was with Helene's help that the young Beethoven largely overcame his excessive diffidence and learned more refined social manners. According to Wegeler, the Breuning family helped to cultivate Beethoven's lifelong passion for literature and poetry.
