= Ludwig van Beethoven =

German composer (1770–1827)

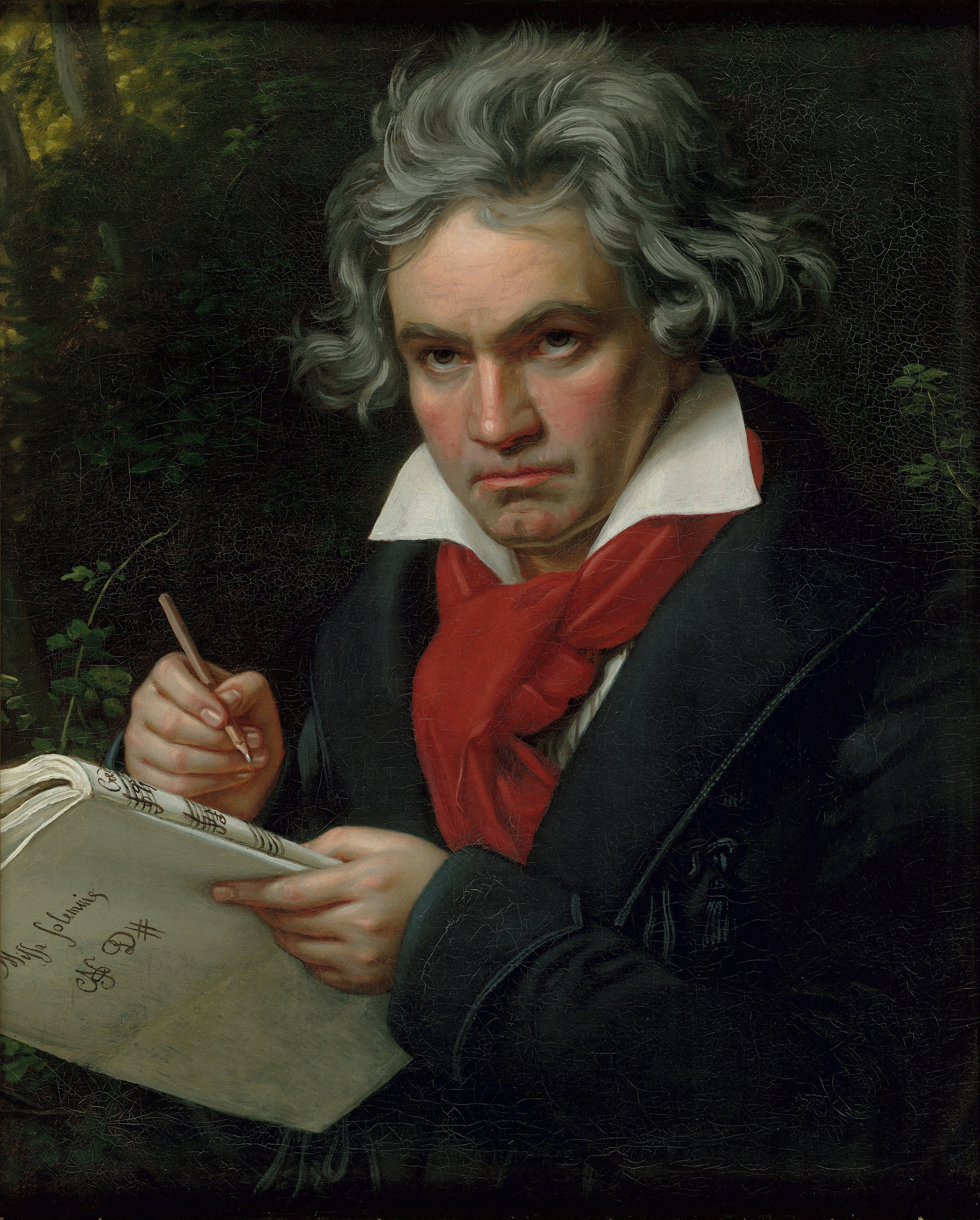
- Beethoven with the Manuscript of the Missa Solemnis (1820)
- Born: Bonn
- Baptised: 17 December 1770
- Died: 26 March 1827 (aged 56); Vienna
- Occupations: Composer; pianist
- Works: List of compositions
- Parents: Johann van Beethoven; Maria Magdalena Keverich

Ludwig van Beethoven (Note: German: [ˈluːtvɪç fan ˈbeːtˌhoːfn̩]. The surname is pronounced /ˈbeɪtoʊvən/ BAY-toh-vən in English.) (baptised 17 December 1770 – 26 March 1827) was a German composer and pianist. A seminal figure in the history of music, his personal style was a key driver of the transition from Classical to Romantic music. He expanded instrumental forms such as the symphony, the piano sonata, and the string quartet. Beethoven is widely revered as one of the greatest composers of all time, and his compositions are among the most performed in the world.

Born in Bonn, Beethoven was a musical prodigy. He was initially taught intensively by his father, Johann van Beethoven, and later by Christian Gottlob Neefe. He found relief from a dysfunctional home life with the family of Helene von Breuning, whose children he loved, befriended, and taught piano. At age 21, he moved to Vienna, which became his base, and studied composition with Joseph Haydn. Beethoven gained a reputation as a virtuoso pianist, and was soon patronized by Karl Alois, Prince Lichnowsky for compositions, which resulted in his three Piano Trios, Op. 1, the earliest works to which he accorded an opus number, in 1795. His Pathétique Sonata was composed in 1798. Around this time, Beethoven began experiencing symptoms of hearing loss.

His career is divided into three periods. In the first, he composed in the classical style of Haydn and Wolfgang Amadeus Mozart. Beethoven's First Symphony premiered in 1800, and his first set of string quartets was published in 1801. The Moonlight Sonata, dedicated to his pupil Julie Guicciardi, is one of his most popular works. In the middle period (1802–1812), he developed a distinctive style. His Third (Eroica) and Fifth Symphonies premiered in 1805 and 1808, respectively. The former was unprecedented in scale and scope. His opera, Fidelio, premiered in 1805, and was later revised. His Violin Concerto appeared in 1806. His Razumovsky quartets were published in 1808. Other middle works include the Waldstein and Appassionata sonatas for piano, the Kreutzer sonata for violin and his Seventh Symphony. His Emperor piano concerto premiered in 1811, without the composer as soloist.

His late period (1812–1827) included some of his most innovative works. His Missa solemnis and his final symphony, the Ninth, premiered in 1824. The latter was the first major example of a choral symphony. His Diabelli Variations and late piano sonatas, particularly the Hammerklavier, are summits of the keyboard literature. His late string quartets, including the Große Fuge, of 1825–1826, are considered pinnacles of the genre. After several months of illness, which left him bedridden, Beethoven died on 26 March 1827 at the age of 56.

== Life and career ==
=== Early life and education ===
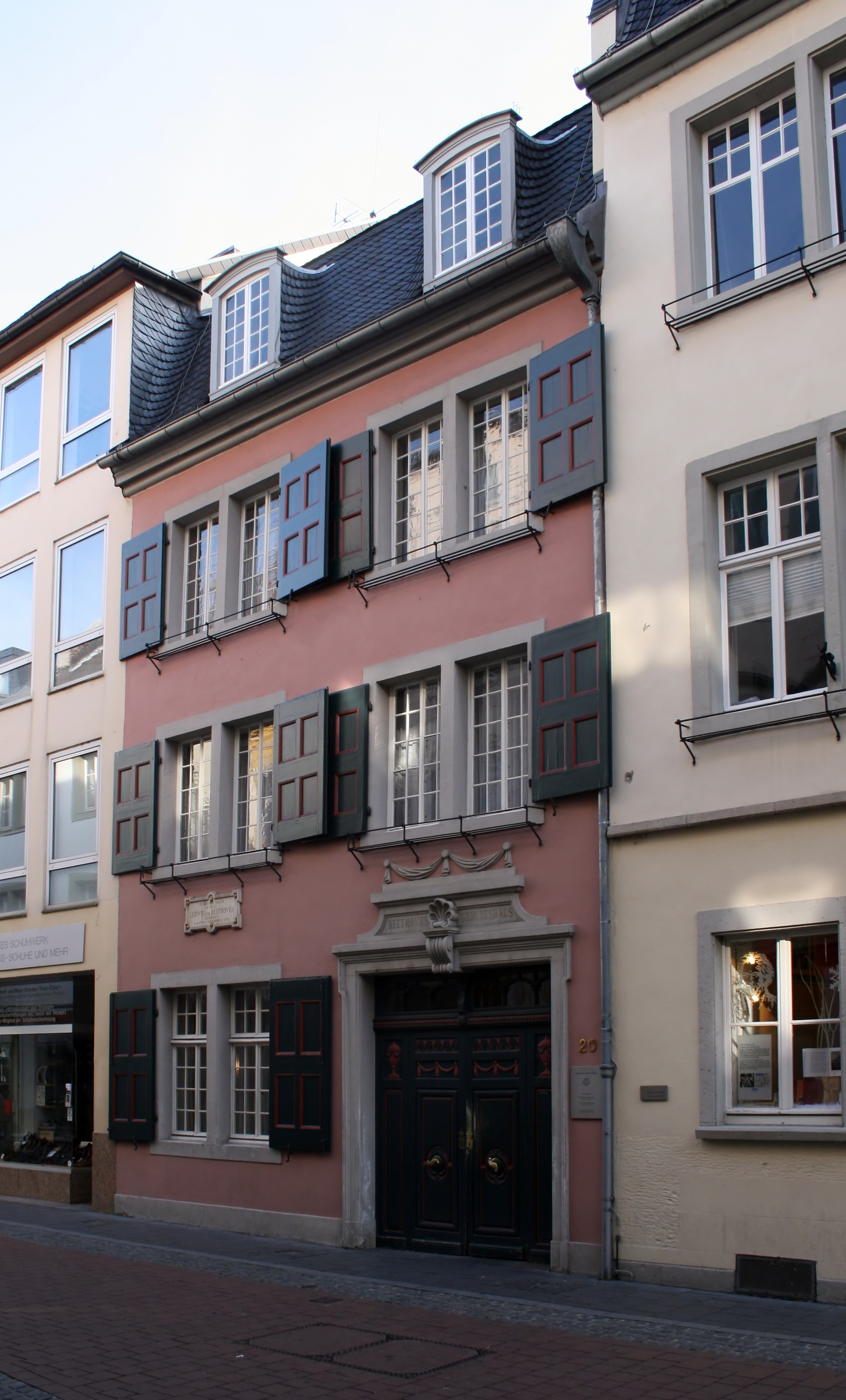
Beethoven's birthplace at Bonngasse 20 in Bonn is now the Beethoven-Haus museum.

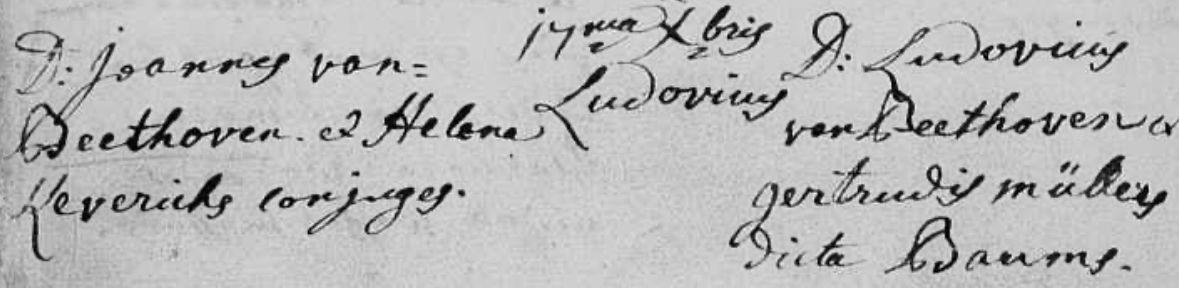
Ludwig van Beethoven baptismal document

Beethoven was the grandson of Ludwig van Beethoven, (Note: The prefix van to the surname Beethoven reflects the Flemish origins of the family name.) a musician from the city of Mechelen in Austrian Netherlands (now Belgium), who moved to Bonn at the age of 21. Ludwig was employed as a bass singer at the court of Clemens August, Archbishop-Elector of Cologne, eventually rising to become, in 1761, Kapellmeister (music director) and hence a preeminent musician in Bonn. The portrait he commissioned of himself toward the end of his life remained displayed in his grandson's rooms as a talisman of his musical heritage. Ludwig had two sons, the younger of whom, Johann, worked as a tenor in the same musical establishment and gave keyboard and violin lessons to supplement his income.

Johann married Maria Magdalena Keverich in 1767; she was the daughter of Heinrich Keverich (1701–1751), who was head chef at the court of Johann IX Philipp von Walderdorff, Archbishop of Trier. Beethoven was born of this marriage in Bonn, at what is now the Beethoven House Museum, Bonngasse 20. There is no authentic record of the date of his birth; but the registry of his baptism, in the Catholic Parish of St. Remigius on 17 December 1770, survives, and the custom in the region at the time was to carry out baptism within 24 hours of birth. There is a consensus (with which Beethoven himself agreed) that his birth date was 16 December, but there is no documented proof of this.

Of the seven children born to Johann van Beethoven, only Ludwig, the second-born, and two younger brothers survived infancy. Kaspar Anton Karl (generally known as Karl) was born on 8 April 1774, and Nikolaus Johann, who was generally known as Johann, the youngest, was born on 2 October 1776.

Beethoven's father was his first music teacher. He later had other local teachers, including the court organist Gilles van den Eeden (d. 1782), Tobias Friedrich Pfeiffer, a family friend, who provided keyboard tuition, Franz Rovantini, a relative who instructed him in playing the violin and viola, and court concertmaster Franz Anton Ries, who instructed Beethoven on the violin. His tuition began in his fifth year. The regime was harsh and intensive, often reducing him to tears. With the involvement of Pfeiffer, who was an insomniac, there were irregular late-night sessions with the young Beethoven dragged from his bed to the keyboard. Beethoven's musical talent became obvious at a young age. Aware of Leopold Mozart's successes in this area with his son Wolfgang and daughter Nannerl, Johann attempted to promote his son as a child prodigy, claiming that Ludwig was six (he was seven) on the posters for his first public performance in March 1778.

Beethoven's musical abilities far exceeded his mathematical capabilities. As a student at the Tirocinium, Beethoven learned how to add numbers but he could neither divide nor multiply. Throughout Beethoven's life, he multiplied numbers by addition (e.g. adding up a column of sixteen sevens, rather than multiplying 16 × 7).

=== 1780–1792: Bonn ===
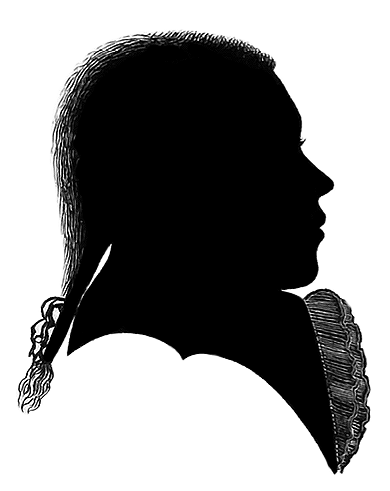
A silhouette image made of Beethoven "in his 16th year", c. 1786, age 15. He wears the uniform and wig suited to his employment as a court musician in Bonn.

In 1780 or 1781, Beethoven began his studies with his most important teacher in Bonn, Christian Gottlob Neefe. Neefe taught him composition; in March 1783, Beethoven's first published work appeared, a set of keyboard variations (WoO 63). (Note: Most of Beethoven's early works and those to which he did not give an opus number were listed by Georg Kinsky and Hans Halm as "WoO", works without opus number. Kinsky and Halm also listed 18 doubtful works in their appendix ("WoO Anhang"). In addition, some minor works not listed with opus numbers or in the WoO list have Hess catalogue numbers.) Beethoven soon began working with Neefe as assistant organist, at first unpaid (1782), and then as a paid employee (1784) of the court chapel. His first three piano sonatas, WoO 47, sometimes known as Kurfürst (Elector) for their dedication to Elector Maximilian Friedrich, were published in 1783.

In 1783, the first printed reference to Beethoven appeared in the Magazin der Musik – "Louis van Beethoven [sic] ... a boy of 11 years and most promising talent. He plays the piano very skilfully and with power, reads at sight very well ... the chief piece he plays is Das wohltemperierte Klavier of Sebastian Bach, which Herr Neefe puts into his hands". Maximilian Friedrich's successor as Elector of Cologne was Maximilian Franz. He gave some support to Beethoven, appointing him Court Organist and assisting financially with Beethoven's move to Vienna in 1792.

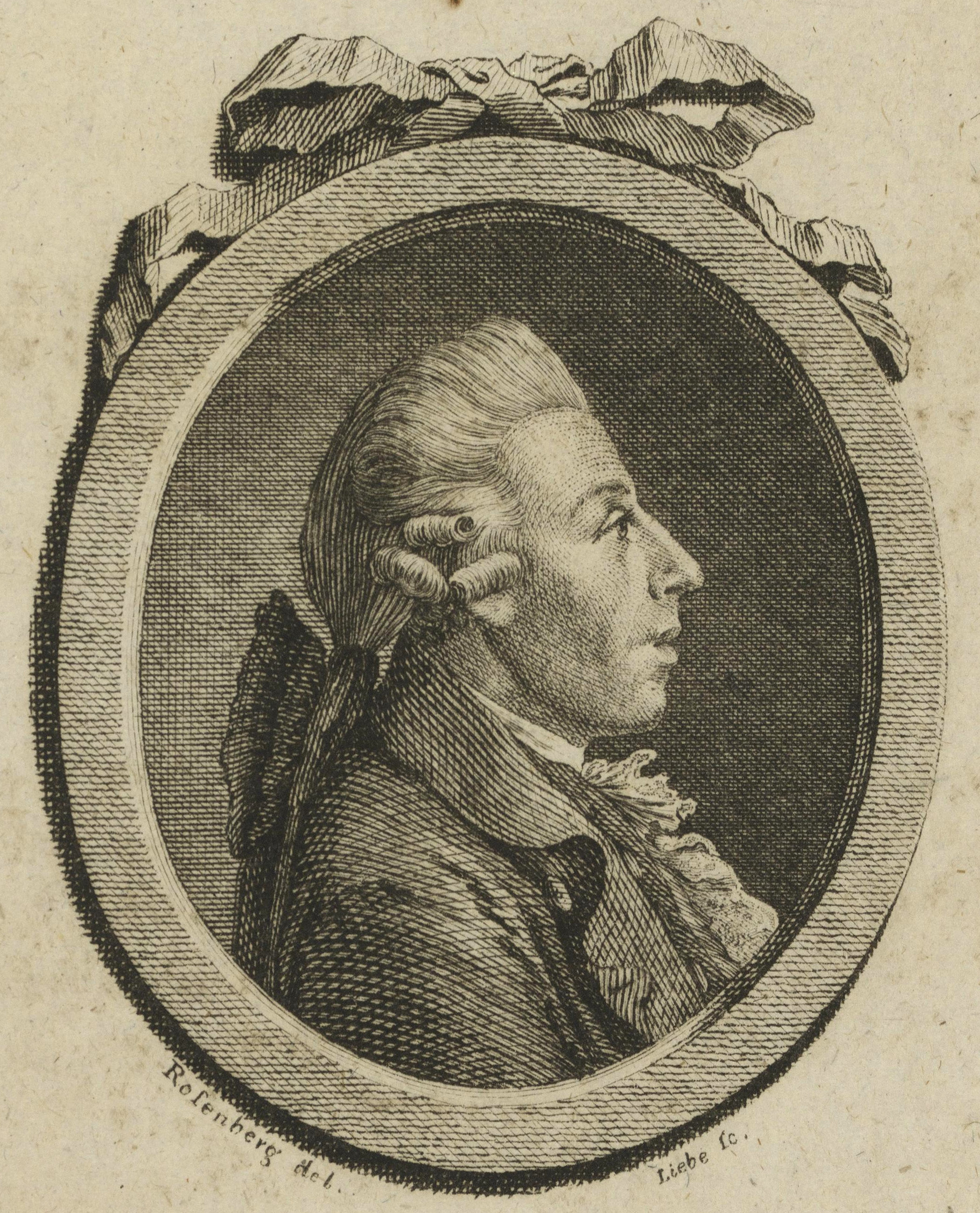
Christian Gottlob Neefe, one of Beethoven's first music teachers, depicted in a c. 1798 engraving

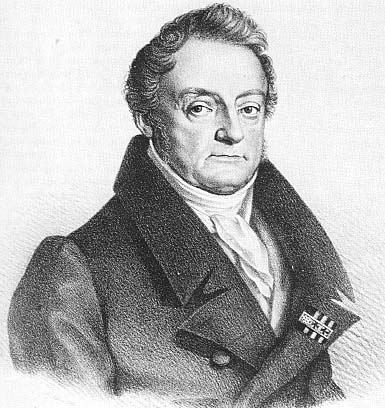
Count Waldstein, depicted in a c. 1800 portrait by Antonín Machek

Beethoven developed a close relationship with the upper-class von Breuning family, and gave piano lessons to some of the children. The widowed Helene von Breuning became a "second mother" to Beethoven, taught him more refined manners and nurtured his passion for literature and poetry. The warmth and closeness of the von Breuning family offered the young Beethoven a retreat from his unhappy home life, dominated by Johann's's decline due to alcoholism. Beethoven also met Franz Wegeler, a young medical student, who became a lifelong friend and married one of the von Breuning daughters. Another frequenter of the von Breunings was Count Ferdinand von Waldstein, who became a friend and financial supporter of Beethoven during this period. In 1791, Waldstein commissioned Beethoven's first work for the stage, the ballet Musik zu einem Ritterballett (WoO 1).

The period of 1785 to 1790 includes virtually no record of Beethoven's activity as a composer. This may be attributed to the varied response his initial publications attracted, and also to ongoing issues in his family. While passing through Augsburg, Beethoven visited with composer Anna von Schaden and her husband, who gave him money to return to Bonn to be with his ailing mother. Beethoven's mother died in July 1787, shortly after his return from Vienna, where he stayed for around two weeks.

In 1789, due to his chronic alcoholism, Johann was forced to retire from the service of the Court and it was ordered that half of his father's pension be paid directly to Ludwig for support of the family. Ludwig contributed further to the family's income by teaching, to which Wegeler said he had "an extraordinary aversion", and by playing viola in the court orchestra. This familiarised him with a variety of operas, including works by Mozart, Gluck and Paisiello. There he also befriended Anton Reicha, a composer, flutist, and violinist of about his own age who was a nephew of the court orchestra's conductor, Josef Reicha.

From 1790 to 1792, Beethoven composed several works, only one of which (the piano variation set on Righini's "Venni amore", WoO 65) was published at the time; they showed a growing range and maturity. It was perhaps on Neefe's recommendation that Beethoven received his first commissions; the Literary Society in Bonn commissioned a cantata to mark the recent death of Joseph II (WoO 87), and a further cantata, to celebrate the subsequent accession of Leopold II as Holy Roman Emperor (WoO 88), may have been commissioned by the Elector. These two Emperor Cantatas were not performed during Beethoven's lifetime and became lost until the 1880s.

Beethoven was probably first introduced to Joseph Haydn in December 1790, when Haydn was travelling to London and made a brief stop in Bonn around Christmastime. In July 1792, they met again in Bonn on Haydn's return trip from London to Vienna, when Beethoven played in the orchestra at the Redoute in Godesberg. Arrangements were likely made at that time for Beethoven to study with Haydn. Waldstein wrote to Beethoven before his departure: "You are going to Vienna in fulfilment of your long-frustrated wishes ... With the help of assiduous labour you shall receive Mozart's spirit from Haydn's hands."

=== 1792–1802: Vienna – the early years ===
In November 1792, Beethoven moved permanently to Vienna from Bonn amid rumours of war spilling out of France. Shortly after his departure, Beethoven learned that his father had died. Over the next few years, he responded to the widespread feeling that he was a successor to the recently deceased Mozart by studying Mozart's work and writing works with a distinctly Mozartian flavour; see Beethoven and Mozart.

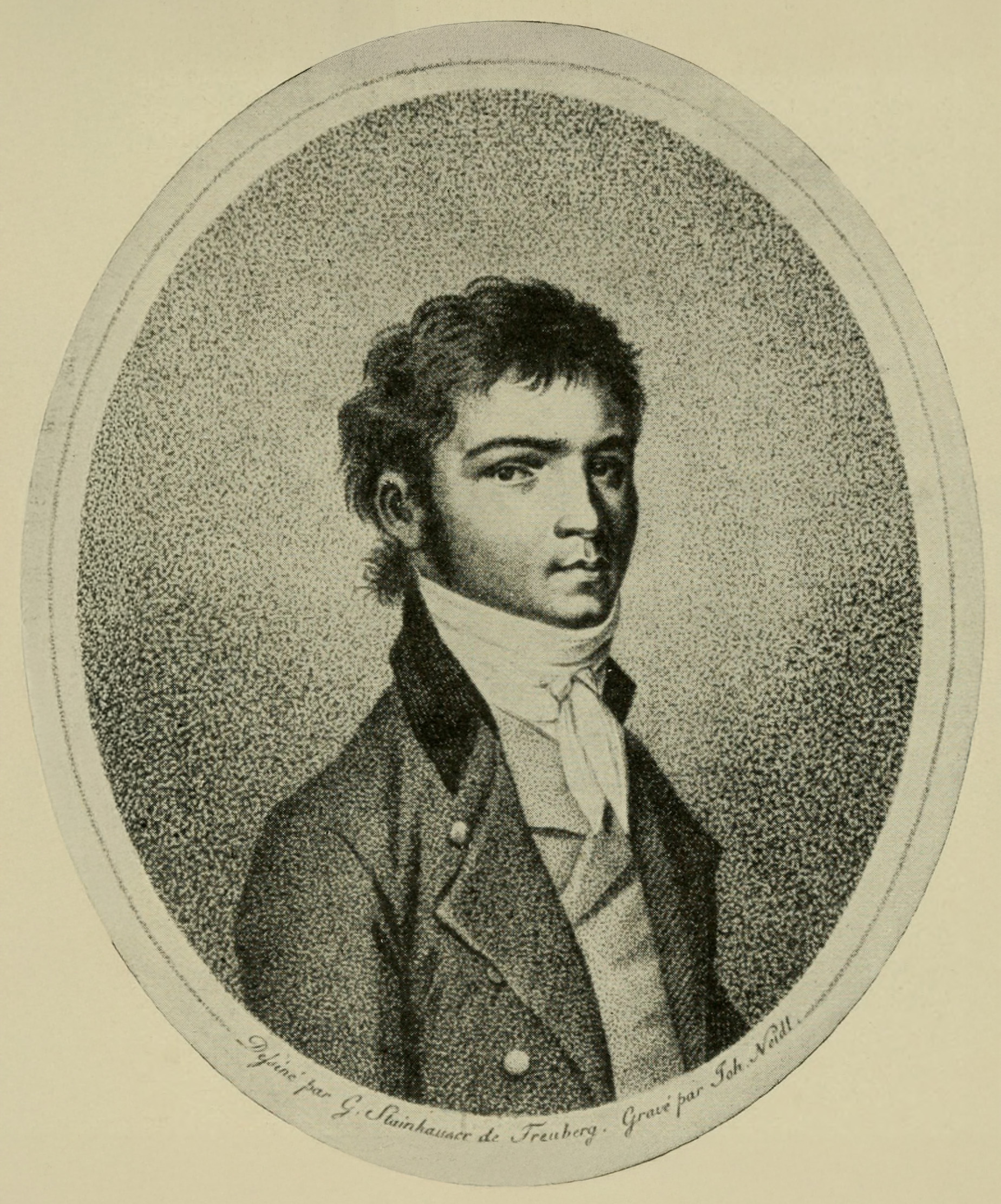
The earliest known portrait of Beethoven as an adult, age 29. An engraving, c. 1801 by Johann Joseph Neidl after a now-lost portrait by Gandolph Ernst Stainhauser von Treuberg, c. 1800.

Beethoven did not immediately set out to establish himself as a composer but rather devoted himself to study and performance. Working under Haydn's direction, he sought to master counterpoint. He also studied violin under Ignaz Schuppanzigh. Early in this period, he also began receiving occasional instruction from Antonio Salieri, primarily in Italian vocal composition style; this relationship persisted until at least 1802, and possibly as late as 1809.

in 1794, with Haydn's departure for England, Beethoven was expected by the Elector to return home to Bonn. He chose instead to remain in Vienna, continuing his instruction in counterpoint with Johann Albrechtsberger and other teachers. In any case, by this time it must have seemed clear to his employer that Bonn would fall to the French, as it did in October 1794, effectively leaving Beethoven without a stipend or the necessity to return. Several Viennese noblemen had already recognised his ability and offered him financial support, among them Prince Joseph Franz Lobkowitz, Prince Karl Lichnowsky, and Baron Gottfried van Swieten.

Assisted by his connections with Haydn and Waldstein, Beethoven began to develop a reputation as a performer and improviser in the salons of the Viennese nobility. His friend Nikolaus Simrock began publishing his compositions, starting with a set of keyboard variations on a theme of Carl Ditters von Dittersdorf (WoO 66). By 1793, he had established a reputation in Vienna as a piano virtuoso, but he apparently withheld works from publication so that their eventual appearance would have greater impact.

In 1795, Beethoven made his public debut in Vienna over three days, beginning with a performance of one of his own piano concertos on 29 March at the Burgtheater (Note: It is uncertain whether this was the First (Op. 15) or Second (Op. 19 which was in fact written earlier than Op. 15). Documentary evidence is lacking, and both concertos were still in manuscript (neither was completed or published for several years). Some authorities favour Op. 15, but Oxford Music Online suggests it was probably Op. 19.) and ending with an unspecified Mozart concerto on 31 March. By this year he had two piano concertos available for performance, one in B♭ major he had begun composing before moving to Vienna and had worked on for over a decade, and one in C major composed for the most part during 1795. Viewing the latter as the more substantive work, he chose to designate it his first piano concerto, publishing it in March 1801 as Opus 15, before publishing the former as Opus 19 the following December. He wrote new cadenzas for both in 1809.

Shortly after his public debut, Beethoven arranged for the publication of the first of his compositions to which he assigned an opus number, the three piano trios, Opus 1. These works were dedicated to his patron Prince Lichnowsky and were a financial success; Beethoven's profits were nearly sufficient to cover his living expenses for a year. In 1799, Beethoven participated in (and won) a notorious piano 'duel' at the home of Baron Raimund Wetzlar (a former patron of Mozart) against the virtuoso Joseph Wölfl; and the next year he similarly triumphed against Daniel Steibelt at the salon of Count Moritz von Fries. Beethoven's eighth piano sonata, the Pathétique (Op. 13, published in 1799), is described by the musicologist Barry Cooper as "surpass[ing] any of his previous compositions, in strength of character, depth of emotion, level of originality, and ingenuity of motivic and tonal manipulation".

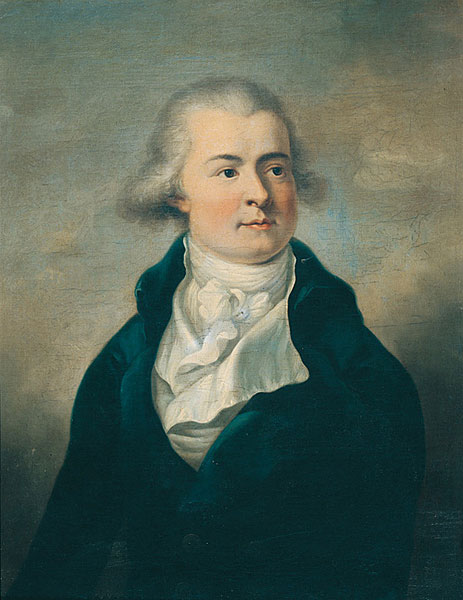
A portrait of Prince Lobkowitz by August Friedrich Oelenhainz

Between 1798 and 1800, Beethoven composed his first six string quartets (Op. 18) (commissioned by, and dedicated to, Prince Lobkowitz), published in 1801. He also completed his Septet (Op. 20) in 1799, a work which was extremely popular during Beethoven's lifetime. With premieres of his First and Second Symphonies in 1800 and 1803, Beethoven became regarded as one of the most important of a generation of young composers following Haydn and Mozart. But his melodies, musical development, use of modulation and texture, and characterisation of emotion all set him apart from his influences, and heightened the impact some of his early works made when they were first published.

For the premiere of his First Symphony, he hired the Burgtheater on 2 April 1800, and staged an extensive programme, including works by Haydn and Mozart, as well as his Septet, the Symphony, and one of his piano concertos (the latter three works all then unpublished). The concert, which the Allgemeine musikalische Zeitung called "the most interesting concert in a long time", was not without difficulties; among the criticisms was that "the players did not bother to pay any attention to the soloist". By the end of 1800, Beethoven and his music were already much in demand from patrons and publishers.

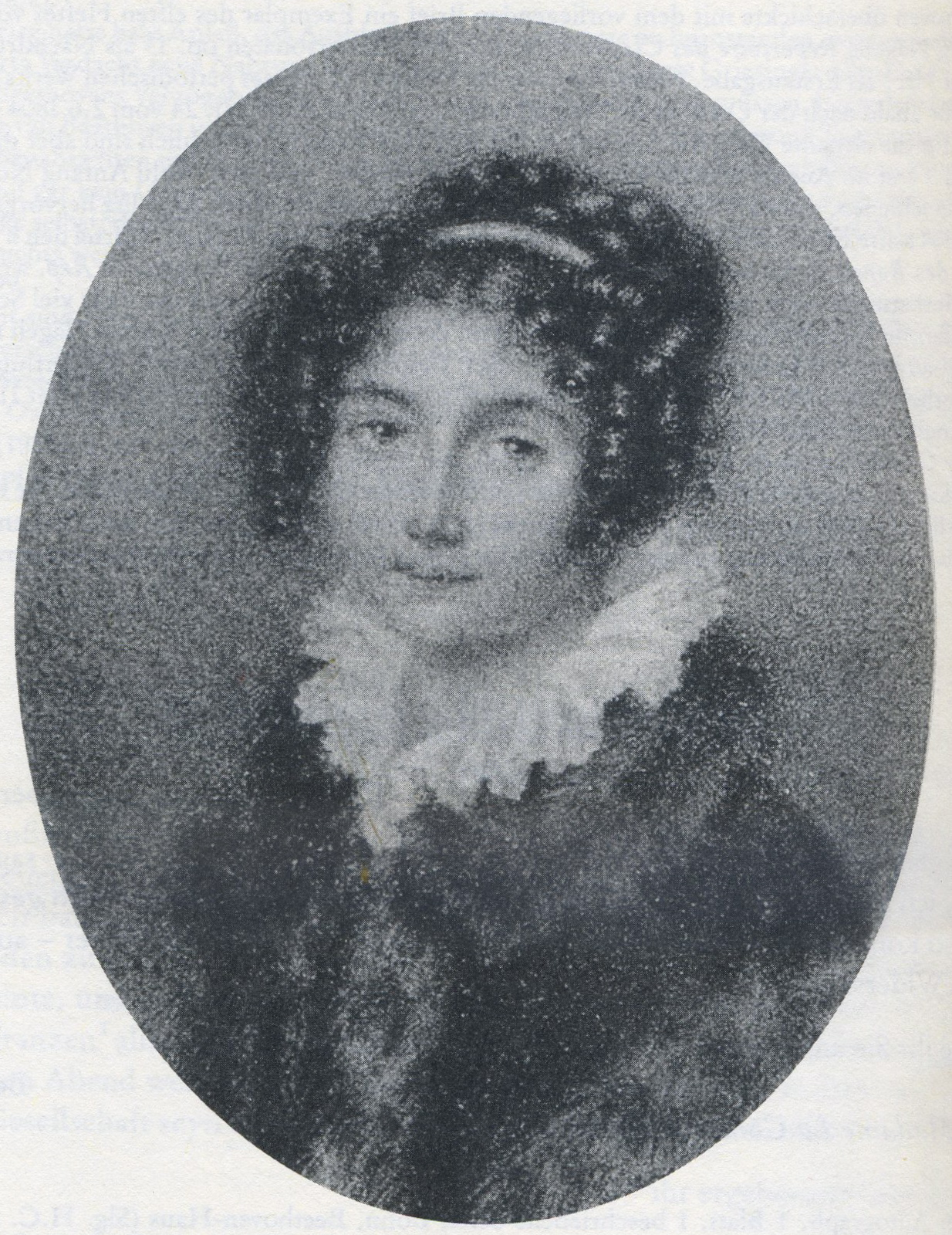
A pre-1804 sketch of Josephine Brunsvik

In May 1799, Beethoven taught piano to the daughters of Hungarian Countess Anna Brunsvik. During this time, he fell in love with the younger daughter, Josephine. Among his other students, from 1801 to 1805, he tutored Ferdinand Ries, who went on to become a composer and later wrote about their encounters. The young Carl Czerny, who later became a renowned pianist and music teacher himself, studied with Beethoven from 1801 to 1803. Czerny described his teacher at their initial meeting in 1801:

Beethoven was dressed in a jacket of shaggy dark grey material and matching trousers, and he reminded me immediately of Campe's Robinson Crusoe, whose book I was reading just then. His jet-black hair bristled shaggily around his head. His beard, unshaven for several days, made the lower part of his swarthy face still darker.

In late 1801, Beethoven met a young countess, Julie Guicciardi, through the Brunsvik family; he mentions his love for Julie in a November 1801 letter to a friend, but class difference prevented any consideration of pursuing it. He dedicated his 1802 Sonata Op. 27 No. 2, now commonly known as the Moonlight, to her.

In the spring of 1801, Beethoven completed a ballet, The Creatures of Prometheus (Op. 43). The work received numerous performances in 1801 and 1802 and he rushed to publish a piano arrangement to capitalise on its early popularity. Beethoven completed his Second Symphony in 1802, intended for performance at a concert that was cancelled. The symphony received its premiere one year later, at a subscription concert in April 1803 at the Theater an der Wien, where Beethoven had been appointed composer in residence. In addition to the Second Symphony, the concert featured the First Symphony, the Third Piano Concerto, and the oratorio Christ on the Mount of Olives. Reviews of the concert were mixed, but it was a financial success; Beethoven was able to charge three times the cost of a typical concert ticket.

In 1802, Beethoven's brother Kaspar began to assist the composer in handling his affairs, particularly his business dealings with music publishers. In addition to successfully negotiating higher payments for Beethoven's latest works, Kaspar also began selling several of Beethoven's earlier unpublished compositions and encouraged his brother (against Beethoven's preference) to make arrangements and transcriptions of his more popular works for other instruments and combinations. Beethoven decided to accede to these requests, as he was powerless to prevent publishers from hiring others to do similar arrangements of his works.

=== 1802–1812: The "heroic" period ===
==== Deafness ====
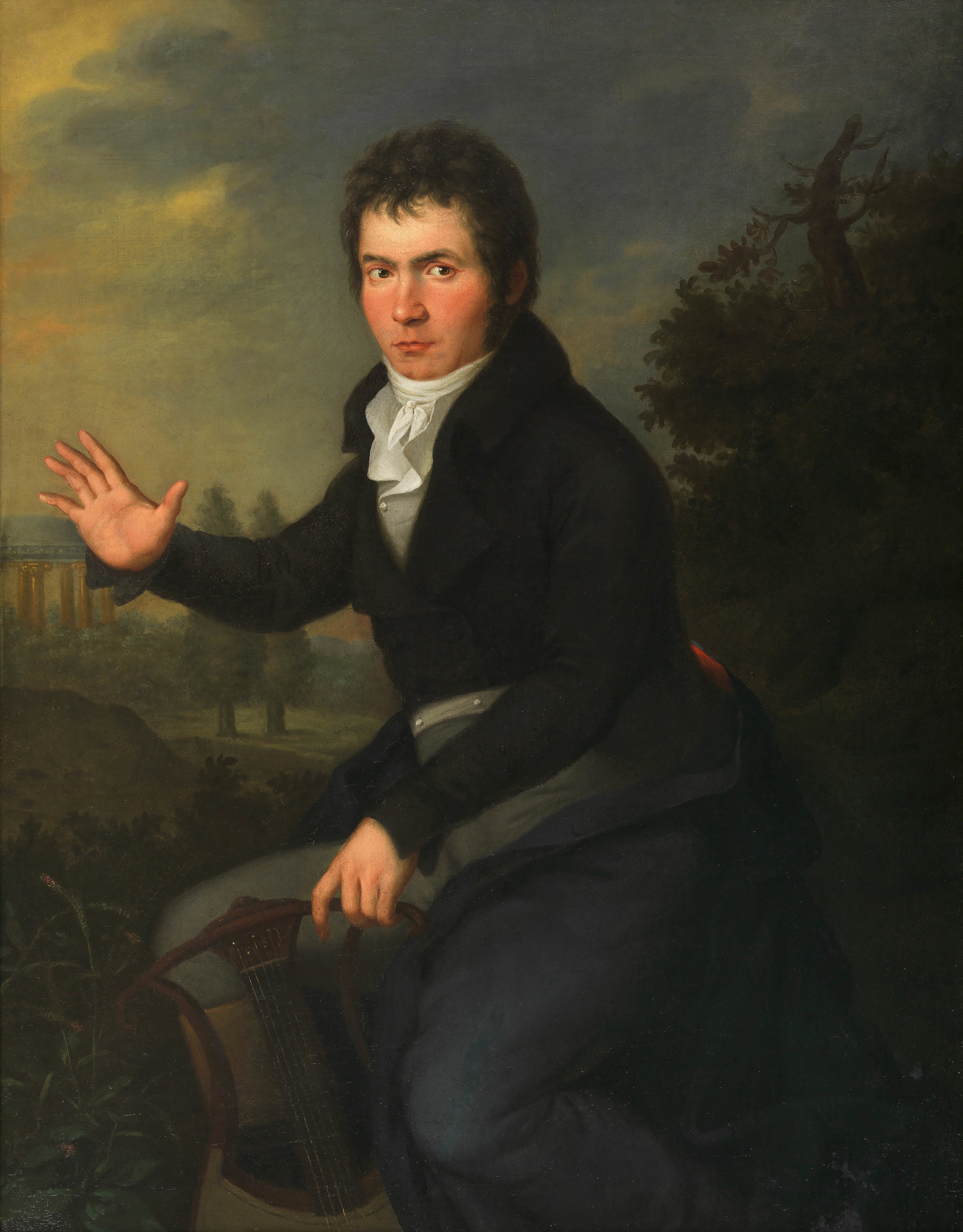
A portrait of Beethoven at age 33, with a lyre-guitar by Joseph Willibrord Mähler, c. 1804

Beethoven told the English pianist Charles Neate (in 1815) that his hearing loss began in 1798, during a heated quarrel with a singer. During its gradual decline, his hearing was further impeded by a severe form of tinnitus. As early as 1801, he wrote to close friends Wegeler and Carl Amenda describing his symptoms and the difficulties they caused in both professional and social settings (although it is likely some of his other close friends were already aware of the issues). The cause was probably otosclerosis, possibly accompanied by degeneration of the auditory nerve. (Note: The cause of Beethoven's deafness has also variously been attributed to, among other possibilities, lead poisoning from Beethoven's preferred wines. In 2024, researchers found very high lead concentrations in souvenir strands of Beethoven's hair, providing evidence for the theory of lead poisoning. Another possibility is that it was caused by complications from a case of murine typhus from 1796.)

On his doctor's advice, Beethoven moved to the small Austrian town of Heiligenstadt, just outside Vienna, from April to October 1802 in an attempt to come to terms with his condition. There he wrote the document now known as the Heiligenstadt Testament, a letter to his brothers that records his thoughts of suicide due to his growing deafness and his resolution to continue living for and through his art. The letter was never sent and was discovered in his papers after his death. The letters to Wegeler and Amenda were not so despairing; in them Beethoven commented on his ongoing professional and financial success at this period, and his determination, as he expressed it to Wegeler, to "seize Fate by the throat; it shall certainly not crush me completely". In 1806, Beethoven noted on one of his musical sketches: "Let your deafness no longer be a secret—even in art."

Although Beethoven's hearing loss did not prevent him from composing music, it made playing at concerts, an important source of income at this phase of his life, increasingly difficult. It also contributed substantially to his social withdrawal. Czerny remarked that Beethoven could still hear speech and music normally until 1812. Contrary to common belief, Beethoven never became totally deaf; in his final years, he was still able to distinguish low tones and sudden loud sounds.

==== Heroic style ====
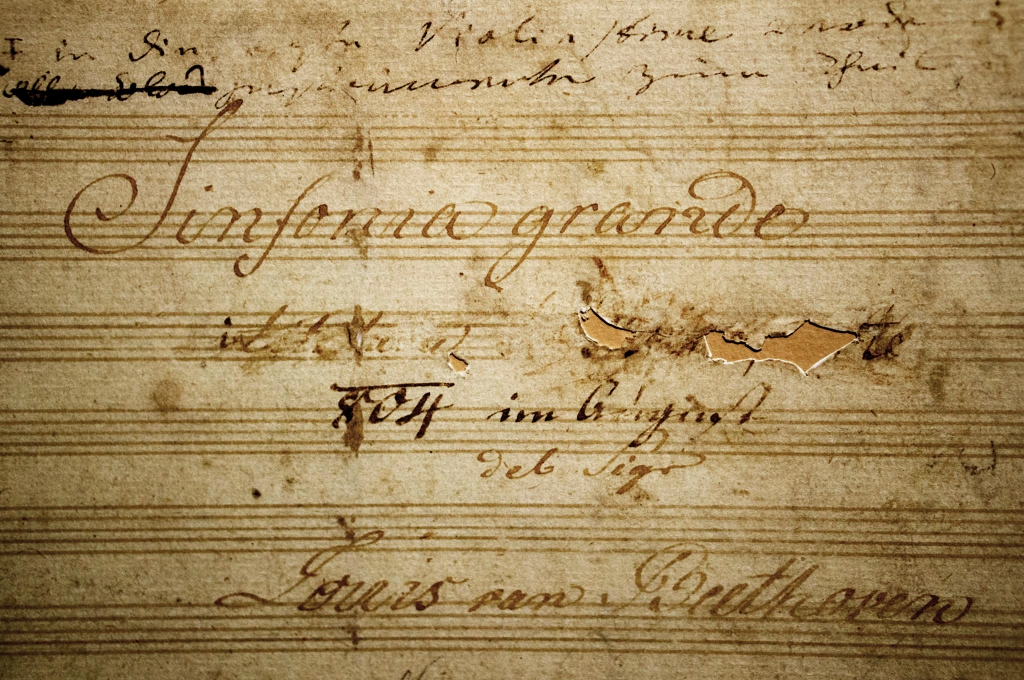
The title page of the manuscript of the Eroica Symphony with Napoleon's name scored through by Beethoven

Beethoven's return to Vienna from Heiligenstadt was marked by a change in musical style, and is now often designated as the start of his middle or "heroic" period, characterised by many original works composed on a grand scale. According to Czerny, Beethoven said: "I am not satisfied with the work I have done so far. From now on I intend to take a new way." A work employing this new style was the Third Symphony in E♭, Op. 55, known as the Eroica, written in 1803–04. The idea of creating a symphony based on the career of Napoleon may have been suggested to Beethoven by General Bernadotte in 1798.

Sympathetic to the ideal of the revolutionary leader, Beethoven originally titled the symphony the "Bonaparte" but, disillusioned by Napoleon declaring himself Emperor in 1804, he scratched Napoleon's name from the manuscript's title page, and the symphony was published in 1806 with its present title, subtitled "to celebrate the memory of a great man". The Eroica was longer and larger in scope than any previous symphony. When it premiered in early 1805 it received a mixed reception. Some listeners objected to its length or disliked its structure, while others viewed it as a masterpiece. In 1807, after a performance in Leipzig, the public demanded it to be played again a week later.

Other middle-period works extend in the same dramatic manner the musical language Beethoven had inherited. The Razumovsky string quartets and the Waldstein and Appassionata piano sonatas share the Third Symphony's heroic spirit. Other works of this period include the Fourth through Eighth Symphonies, the oratorio Christ on the Mount of Olives, the opera Fidelio, and the Violin Concerto. The violinist Felix Radicati said that the Razumovsky quartets were "not music". Beethoven replied, "Oh, they are not for you, but for a later age!"

Beethoven was hailed in 1810 by E. T. A. Hoffmann, in an influential review in the Allgemeine musikalische Zeitung, as the greatest of (what he considered) the three Romantic composers (that is, ahead of Haydn and Mozart). Beethoven's Fifth Symphony, wrote Hoffmann, "sets in motion terror, fear, horror, pain, and awakens the infinite yearning that is the essence of romanticism".

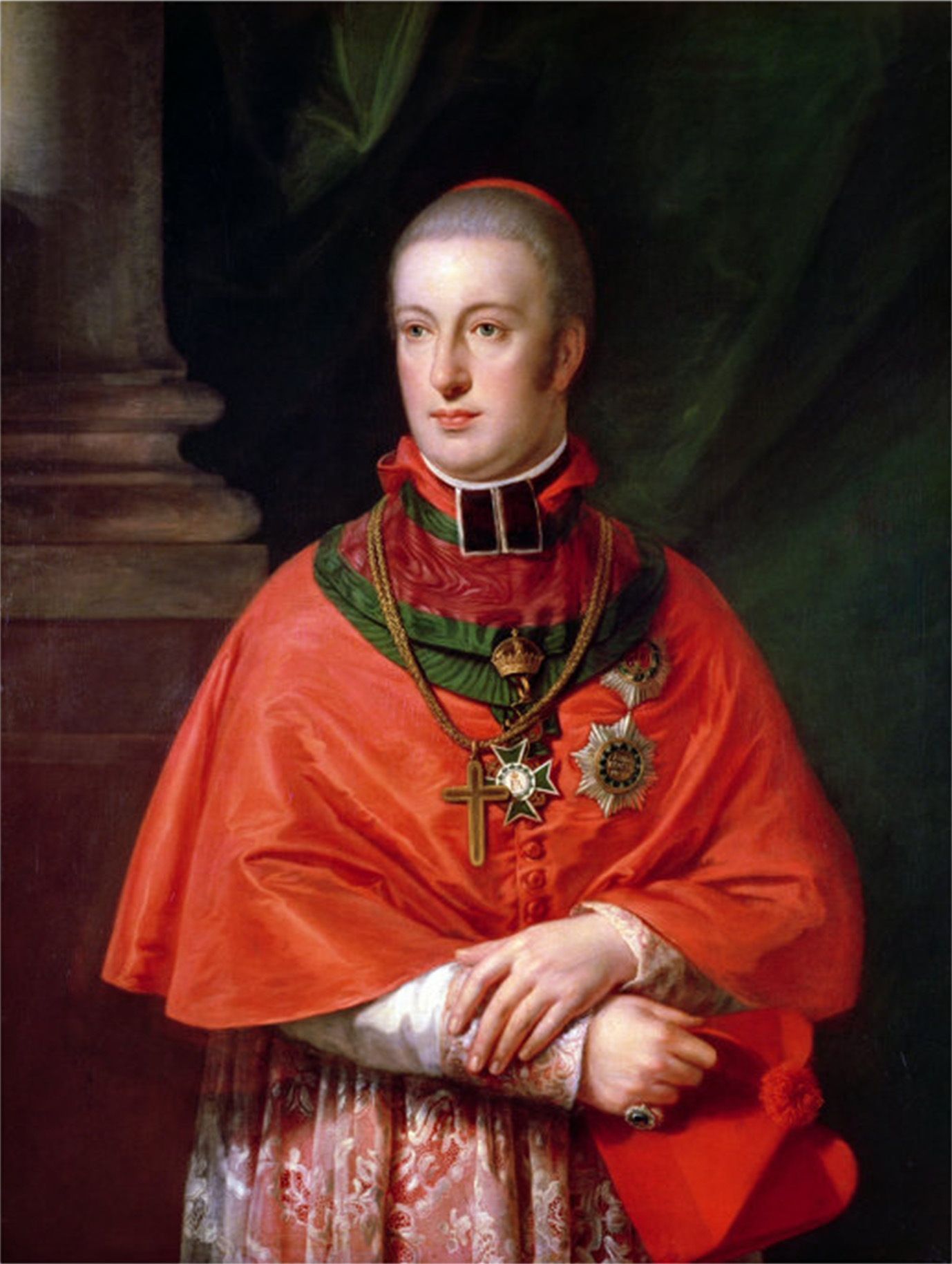
A portrait of Beethoven's patron Archduke Rudolf, by Johann Baptist von Lampi

During this time, Beethoven's income came from publishing his works, from performances of them, and from his patrons, for whom he gave private performances and copies of works they commissioned for an exclusive period before their publication. Some of his early patrons, including Lobkowitz and Lichnowsky, gave him annual stipends in addition to commissioning works and purchasing published works. Perhaps his most important aristocratic patron was Archduke Rudolf of Austria, the youngest son of Emperor Leopold II, who in 1803 or 1804 began to study piano and composition with him. They became friends, and their meetings continued until 1824. Beethoven dedicated 14 compositions to Rudolf, including such major works as the Archduke Trio Op. 97 (1811).

His position at the Theater an der Wien was terminated when the theatre changed management in early 1804, and he was forced to move temporarily to the suburbs of Vienna with his friend Stephan von Breuning. This slowed work on Leonore (his original title for his opera), his largest work to date, for a time. It was delayed again by the Austrian censor and finally premiered, under its present title of Fidelio, in November 1805 to houses that were nearly empty because of the French occupation of the city. This version of Fidelio was a critical and financial failure, and Beethoven began revising it.

Despite this failure, Beethoven continued to attract recognition. In 1807 the musician and publisher Muzio Clementi secured the rights to publish his works in England, and Haydn's former patron Prince Esterházy commissioned the Mass in C, Op. 86, for his wife's name-day. But he could not count on such recognition alone. A colossal benefit concert he organised in December 1808, widely advertised, included the premieres of the Fifth and Sixth (Pastoral) symphonies, the Fourth Piano Concerto, extracts from the Mass in C, the scena and aria "Ah! perfido" Op. 65 and the Choral Fantasy op. 80. There was a large audience (including Czerny and the young Ignaz Moscheles), but it was under-rehearsed, involved many stops and starts, and during the Fantasia Beethoven was noted shouting at the musicians "badly played, wrong, again!" The financial outcome is unknown.

In the autumn of 1808, after having been rejected for a position at the Royal Theatre, Beethoven received an offer from Napoleon's brother Jérôme Bonaparte, then king of Westphalia, for a well-paid position as Kapellmeister at the court in Cassel. To persuade him to stay in Vienna, Archduke Rudolf, Prince Kinsky and Prince Lobkowitz, after receiving representations from Beethoven's friends, pledged to pay him a pension of 4000 florins a year. In the event, Rudolf paid his share of the pension on the agreed date. Kinsky, immediately called to military duty, did not contribute and died in November 1812 after falling from his horse. The Austrian currency destabilised and Lobkowitz went bankrupt in 1811 so that to benefit from the agreement Beethoven eventually had recourse to the law, which in 1815 brought him some recompense.

The imminence of war reaching Vienna was felt in early 1809. In April, Beethoven completed writing his Piano Concerto No. 5 in E♭ major, Op. 73, which the musicologist Alfred Einstein has called "the apotheosis of the military concept" in Beethoven's music. Rudolf left the capital with the Imperial family in early May, prompting Beethoven's piano sonata Les Adieux (Sonata No. 26, Op. 81a), actually titled by Beethoven in German Das Lebewohl (The Farewell), of which the final movement, Das Wiedersehen (The Return), is dated in the manuscript with the date of Rudolf's homecoming of 30 January 1810.

During the French bombardment of Vienna in May, Beethoven took refuge in the cellar of his brother Kaspar's house. The subsequent occupation of Vienna and disruptions to cultural life and to Beethoven's publishers, together with Beethoven's poor health at the end of 1809, explain his significantly reduced output during this period, although other notable works of the year include his String Quartet No. 10 in E♭ major, Op. 74 (The Harp) and the Piano Sonata No. 24 in F♯ major, Op. 78, dedicated to Josephine's sister Therese Brunsvik.

==== Goethe ====
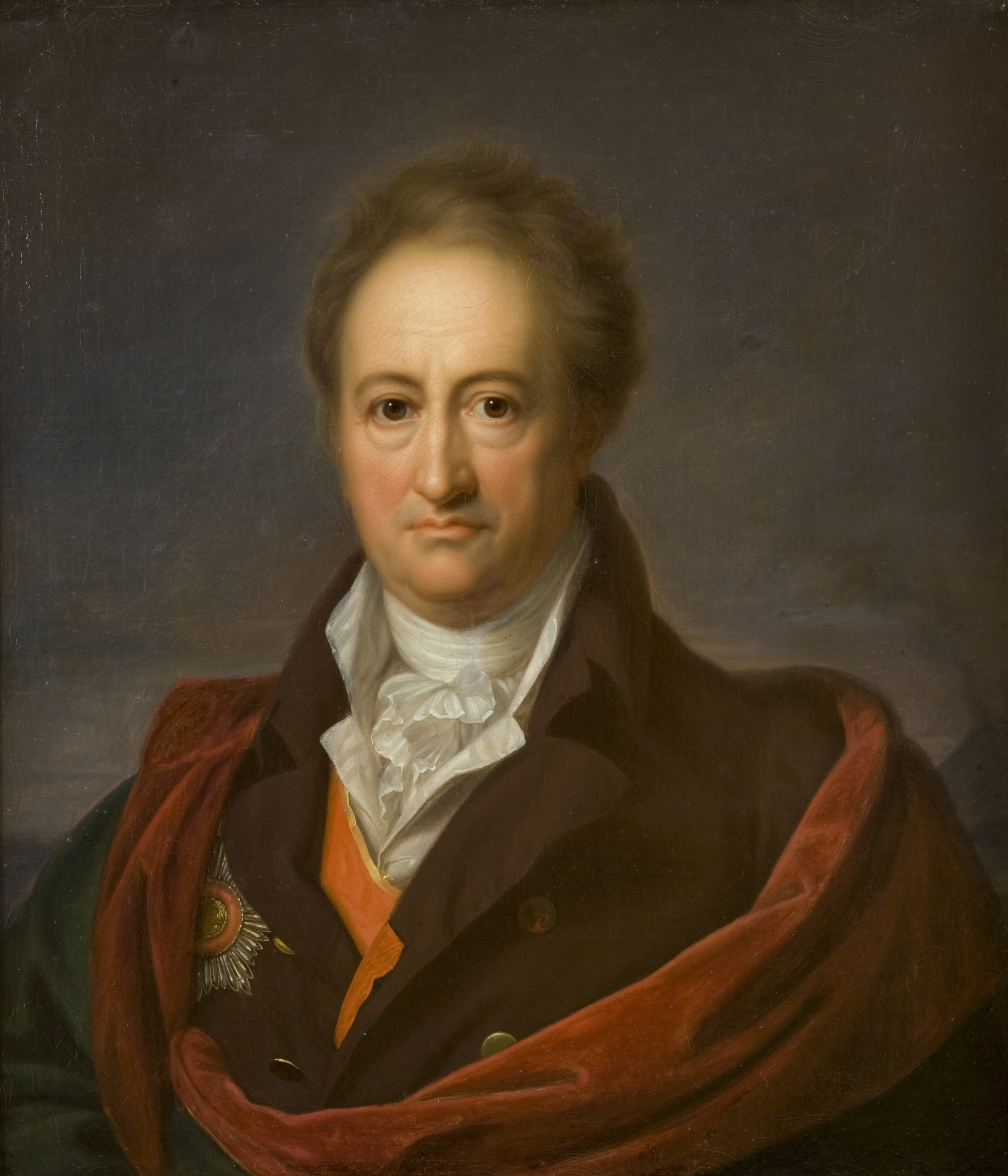
Goethe depicted in a portrait by Gerhard von Kügelgen (1808)

At the end of 1809, Beethoven was commissioned to write incidental music for Goethe's play Egmont. The result (an overture, and nine additional entractes and vocal pieces, Op. 84), which appeared in 1810, fit well with Beethoven's heroic style and he became interested in Goethe, setting three of his poems as songs (Op. 83) and learning about him from a mutual acquaintance, Bettina Brentano (who also wrote to Goethe at this time about Beethoven). Other works of this period in a similar vein were the F minor String Quartet Op. 95, to which Beethoven gave the subtitle Quartetto serioso, and the Op. 97 Piano Trio in B♭ major, known from its dedication to his patron Rudolph, as the Archduke Trio.

In the spring of 1811, Beethoven became seriously ill, with headaches and high fever. His doctor Johann Malfatti recommended he take a cure at the spa of Teplitz (now Teplice in the Czech Republic), where he wrote two more overtures and sets of incidental music for dramas, this time by August von Kotzebue – King Stephen Op. 117 and The Ruins of Athens Op. 113. Advised again to visit Teplitz in 1812, he met there with Goethe, who wrote of Beethoven: "His talent amazed me; unfortunately he is an utterly untamed personality, who is not altogether wrong in finding the world detestable, but surely he does not make it any more enjoyable... by his attitude." Beethoven wrote to his publishers Breitkopf and Härtel, "Goethe delights far too much in the court atmosphere, far more than is becoming in a poet." But following their meeting he began a setting for choir and orchestra of Goethe's Meeresstille und glückliche Fahrt (Calm Sea and Prosperous Voyage), Op. 112, completed in 1815. After it was published in 1822 with a dedication to the poet, Beethoven wrote to him: "The admiration, the love and esteem which already in my youth I cherished for the one and only immortal Goethe have persisted."

==== The Immortal Beloved ====
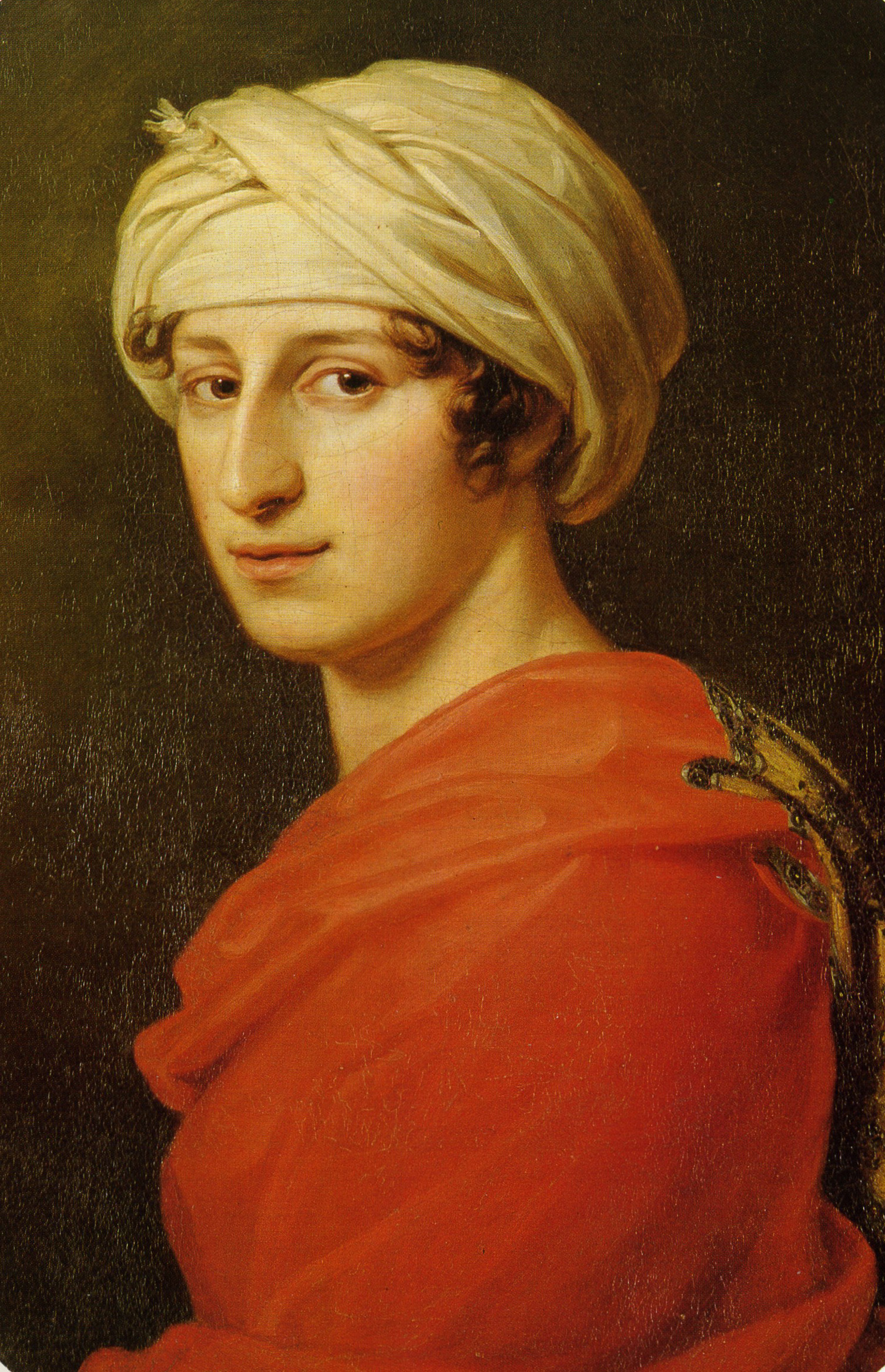
A portrait of Antonie Brentano by Joseph Karl Stieler (1808)

While Beethoven was at Teplitz in 1812, he wrote a ten-page love letter to his "Immortal Beloved", which he never sent. The identity of the intended recipient was long a subject of debate, although the musicologist Maynard Solomon has argued that the intended recipient was Antonie Brentano; other candidates included Julie Guicciardi, Therese Malfatti, Anna Maria Erdődy, and Josephine Brunsvik. (Note: Solomon sets out his case in detail in his biography of Beethoven.)

All of these had been regarded by Beethoven as possible soulmates during his first decade in Vienna. Although Guicciardi flirted with Beethoven, she probably never had any serious interest in him and married Wenzel Robert von Gallenberg in November 1803. (According to Anton Schindler, Beethoven's later secretary and biographer, Beethoven insisted to him that Guicciardi had "sought me out, crying, but I scorned her".) Josephine had, since Beethoven's initial infatuation with her, married the elderly Count Joseph Deym, who died in 1804. Beethoven began to visit her and commenced a passionate correspondence. Initially, he accepted that Josephine could not love him, but he continued to address himself to her even after she had moved to Budapest. Only by 1807, in his last correspondence with her, did he acknowledge that she held little feeling for him in his statement "I thank you for wishing still to appear as if I were not altogether banished from your memory". Malfatti was the niece of Beethoven's doctor and he had proposed to her in 1810, when he was 40 and she was 19; the proposal was rejected. She is now remembered as the possible recipient of the piano bagatelle known as "Für Elise". (Note: The manuscript (now lost) was found in Therese Malfatti's papers after her death by Beethoven's early biographer Ludwig Nohl. It has been suggested that Nohl possibly misread the title, which may have been Für Therese.)

Antonie (Toni) Brentano (née von Birkenstock), ten years younger than Beethoven, was the wife of Franz Dominicus Brentano, the half-brother of Bettina Brentano, who provided Beethoven's introduction to the family. It would seem that Antonie and Beethoven had an affair during 1811–1812. Antonie left Vienna with her husband in late 1812 and never met with (or apparently corresponded with) Beethoven again, although in her later years, she wrote and spoke fondly of him. Some speculate that Beethoven was the father of Antonie's son Karl Josef; "the boy, born in 1813 and never seen by the composer, became ill aged four with a condition that limited his movements and mental capacity."

After 1812, there are no reports of any romantic liaisons of Beethoven's; however, it is clear from his correspondence of the period and, later, from the conversation books, that he occasionally engaged the services of prostitutes.

=== 1813–1822: Acclaim ===
==== Family issues ====
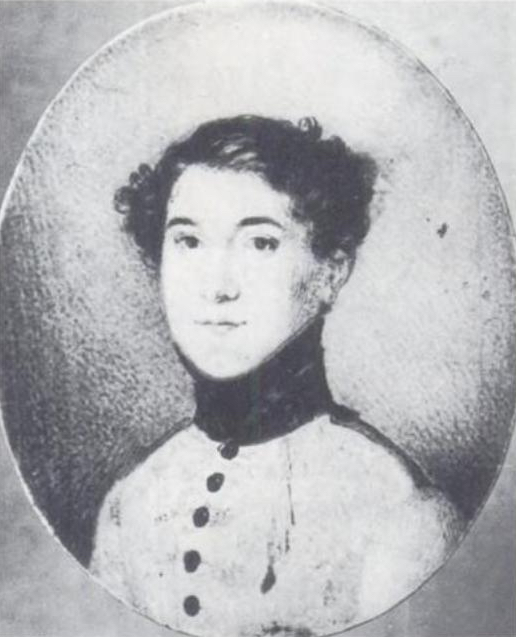
Karl van Beethoven depicted in a miniature portrait (c. 1820)

In early 1813, Beethoven apparently went through a difficult emotional period, and his compositional output dropped. His personal appearance degraded, as did his manners in public, notably when dining.

Family issues could have played a part in this. Beethoven had visited his brother Johann at the end of October 1812. He wished to end Johann's cohabitation with Therese Obermayer, a woman who already had an illegitimate child. He was unable to convince Johann to end the relationship and appealed to the local civic and religious authorities, but Johann and Therese married on 8 November.

The illness and eventual death of his brother Kaspar from tuberculosis became an increasing concern. Kaspar had been ill for some time; in 1813 Beethoven lent him 1500 florins, to procure the repayment of which he was ultimately led to complex legal measures. After Kaspar died on 15 November 1815, Beethoven immediately became embroiled in a protracted legal dispute with Kaspar's widow Johanna over custody of their son Karl, then nine years old. Beethoven had successfully applied to Kaspar to have himself named the sole guardian of the boy. A late codicil to Kaspar's will gave him and Johanna joint guardianship. While Beethoven was successful at having his nephew removed from her custody in January 1816 and had him removed to a private school, in 1818, he was again preoccupied with the legal processes around Karl. While giving evidence to the court for the nobility, the Landrechte, Beethoven was unable to prove that he was of noble birth and as a consequence, on 18 December 1818 the case was transferred to the civil magistrate of Vienna, where he lost sole guardianship. (Note: Their ruling stated: "It ... appears from the statement of Ludwig van Beethoven ... is unable to prove nobility: hence the matter of guardianship is transferred to the Magistrate".) He regained custody after intensive legal struggles in 1820. During the years that followed, Beethoven frequently interfered in his nephew's life in what Karl perceived as an overbearing manner.

==== Post-war Vienna ====
Beethoven was finally motivated to begin significant composition again in June 1813 when news arrived of the French defeat at the Battle of Vitoria by a coalition led by the Duke of Wellington. The inventor Johann Nepomuk Maelzel persuaded him to write a work commemorating the event for his mechanical instrument the Panharmonicon. This Beethoven also transcribed for orchestra as Wellington's Victory (Op. 91, also known as the Battle Symphony). (Note: The work is not a true symphony, but a programmatic piece including French and British soldiers' songs, a battle scene with artillery effects and a fugal treatment of "God Save the King".) It was first performed on 8 December, along with his Seventh Symphony, Op. 92, at a charity concert for victims of the war, a concert whose success led to its repeat on 12 December. The orchestra included several leading and rising musicians who happened to be in Vienna at the time, including Giacomo Meyerbeer and Domenico Dragonetti. The work received repeat performances at concerts staged by Beethoven in January and February 1814. These concerts were the most profitable of Beethoven's career and enabled him to buy the bank shares that were the most valuable assets in his estate at his death. The Allegretto proved particularly popular. In response to Gottfried Weber's negative review, Beethoven wrote "What I shit is better than anything you have ever thought."

Beethoven's renewed popularity led to demands for a revival of Fidelio, which, in its third revised version, was well received at its July opening in Vienna, and was frequently staged there during the following years. Beethoven's publisher, Artaria, commissioned the 20-year-old Moscheles to prepare a piano score of the opera, which he inscribed "Finished, with God's help!"—to which Beethoven added "O Man, help thyself." (Note: "Fine mit Gottes Hülfe" – "O, Mensch, hilf dir selber.") That summer Beethoven composed a piano sonata for the first time in five years, his Sonata in E minor, Opus 90. He was one of many composers who produced music in a patriotic vein to entertain the many heads of state and diplomats who came to the Congress of Vienna that began in November 1814, with the cantata Der glorreiche Augenblick (The Glorious Moment) (Op. 136) and similar choral works which, in the words of Maynard Solomon, "broadened Beethoven's popularity, [but] did little to enhance his reputation as a serious composer".

In April and May 1814, playing in his Archduke Trio, Beethoven made his last public appearances as a soloist. The composer Louis Spohr noted: "the piano was badly out of tune, which Beethoven minded little, since he did not hear it ... there was scarcely anything left of the virtuosity of the artist ... I was deeply saddened." From 1814 onward, Beethoven used for conversation ear-trumpets designed by Johann Nepomuk Maelzel (a number of these are on display at the Beethoven-Haus in Bonn).

His 1815 compositions include an expressive second setting of the poem An die Hoffnung (Op. 94) in 1815. Compared to its first setting in 1805 (a gift for Josephine Brunsvik), it was "far more dramatic ... The entire spirit is that of an operatic scena." But his energy seemed to be dropping: apart from these works, he wrote the two Cello Sonatas Op. 102 nos. 1 and 2, and a few minor pieces, and began but abandoned a sixth piano concerto.

==== Pause ====
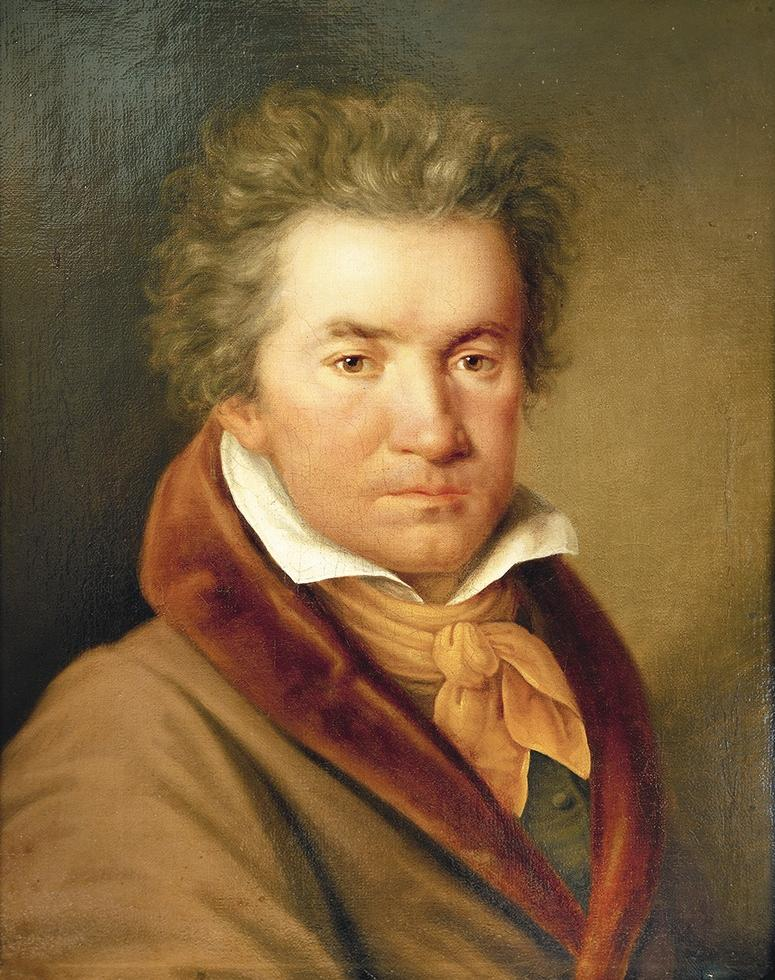
Beethoven (age 44) depicted in a portrait by Joseph Willibrord Mähler (1815)

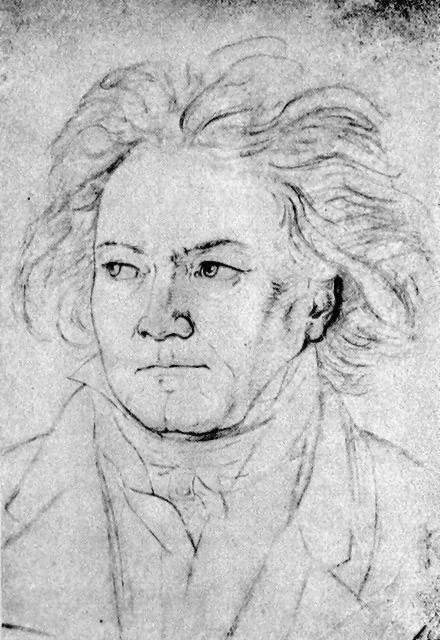
Beethoven (age 47) by August Klöber (1818)

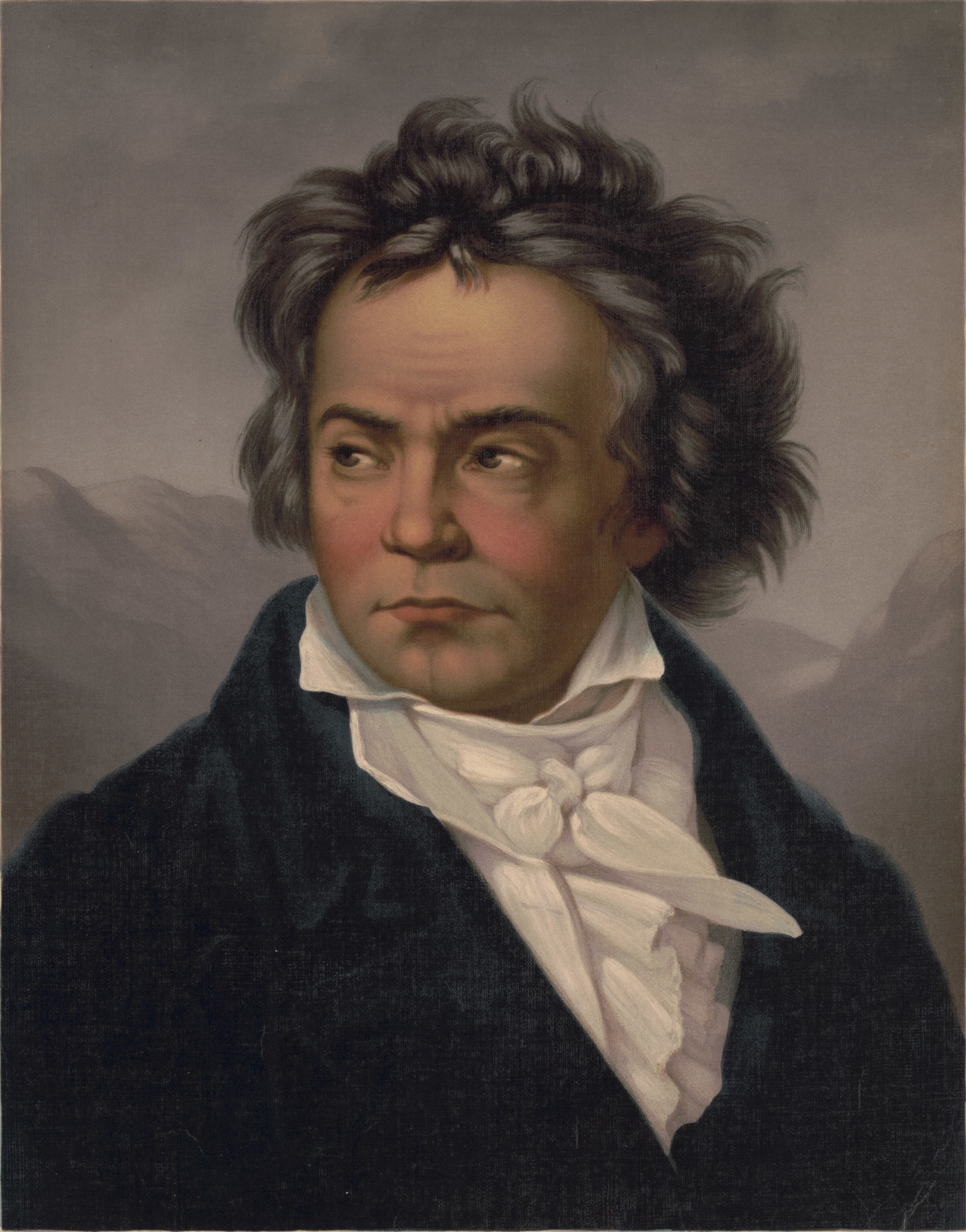
Beethoven (age 48) depicted in a portrait by Ferdinand Schimon (1819)

Between 1815 and 1819, Beethoven's output dropped again to a level unique in his mature life. He attributed part of this to a lengthy illness that he called an inflammatory fever that he had for more than a year starting in October 1816. Solomon suggests it is also doubtless a consequence of the ongoing legal problems concerning his nephew Karl, and of Beethoven finding himself increasingly at odds with current musical trends. Unsympathetic to developments in German romanticism that featured the supernatural (as in operas by Spohr, Heinrich Marschner and Carl Maria von Weber), he also "resisted the impending Romantic fragmentation of the ... cyclic forms of the Classical era into small forms and lyric mood pieces" and turned towards study of Bach, Handel and Palestrina. An old connection was renewed in 1817 when Maelzel sought, and obtained, Beethoven's endorsement for his newly developed metronome. During these years he completed his settings of poems by Alois Jeitteles, An die ferne Geliebte Op. 98 (1816), which introduced the song cycle into classical repertoire. The Hammerklavier Sonata (1818) is considered a summit of the piano literature; the first public performance was in 1836 by Franz Liszt. Upon finishing it, Beethoven wrote "Now I know how to write music."

By early 1818, Beethoven's health had improved, and his nephew Karl, now aged 11, moved in with him in January (although within a year Karl's mother had won him back in the courts). By now, Beethoven's hearing had again seriously deteriorated, necessitating that he and his interlocutors write in notebooks to carry out conversations. These 'conversation books' are a rich written resource for his life from this period onward. They contain discussions about music, business, and personal life; they are also a valuable source for his contacts and for investigations into how he intended his music should be performed, and of his opinions of the art of music. (Note: It was suggested by Beethoven's biographer Alexander Wheelock Thayer that, of 400 conversation books, 264 were destroyed (and others were altered) after his death by his secretary Schindler, who wished only an idealised biography to survive. The music historian Theodore Albrecht has, however, demonstrated that Thayer's allegations were over the top. "[It is now] abundantly clear that Schindler never possessed as many as c. 400 conversation books, and that he never destroyed roughly five-eighths of that number." Schindler did however insert a number of fraudulent entries that bolstered his own profile and his prejudices. Presently 136 books covering the period 1819–1827 are preserved at the Staatsbibliothek Berlin, with another two at the Beethoven-Haus in Bonn.) His household management had also improved somewhat with the help of Nannette Streicher. A proprietor of the Stein piano workshop and a personal friend, Streicher had assisted in Beethoven's care during his illness; she continued to provide some support, and in her he finally found a skilled cook. A testimonial to the esteem in which Beethoven was held in England was the presentation to him in this year by Thomas Broadwood, the proprietor of the company, of a Broadwood piano, for which Beethoven expressed thanks. He was not well enough, however, to carry out a visit to London that year which had been proposed by the Philharmonic Society. (Note: The Broadwood piano is now in the collection of the Hungarian National Museum in Budapest.)

==== Resurgence ====
Despite the time occupied by his ongoing legal struggles over Karl, which involved continuing extensive correspondence and lobbying, two events sparked off Beethoven's major composition projects in 1819. The first was the announcement of Archduke Rudolf's promotion to Cardinal-Archbishop as Archbishop of Olomouc (now in the Czech Republic), which triggered the Missa solemnis Op. 123, intended to be ready for his installation in Olomouc in March 1820. The other was the invitation by the publisher Antonio Diabelli to 50 Viennese composers, including Beethoven, Franz Schubert, Czerny and the 8-year-old Franz Liszt, to compose a variation each on a theme which he provided. Beethoven was spurred to outdo the competition and by mid-1819 had already completed 20 variations of what were to become the 33 Diabelli Variations Op. 120. Neither of these works was completed for a few years. A significant tribute of 1819, however, was Archduke Rudolf's set of 40 piano variations on a theme written for him by Beethoven (WoO 200) and dedicated to the master. Beethoven's portrait by Ferdinand Schimon of this year, which was one of the most familiar images of him for the next century, was described by Schindler as, despite its artistic weaknesses, "in the rendering of that particular look, the majestic forehead ... the firmly shut mouth and the chin shaped like a shell, ... truer to nature than any other picture". Joseph Karl Stieler also created his own portrait of Beethoven.

Beethoven's determination over the following years to write the Mass for Rudolf was likely not motivated by any devout Catholicism. Although he had been born a Catholic, the form of religion as practised at the court in Bonn where he grew up was, in the words of Solomon, "a compromise ideology that permitted a relatively peaceful coexistence between the Church and rationalism". Beethoven's Tagebuch (a diary he kept on an occasional basis between 1812 and 1818) shows his interest in a variety of religious philosophies, including the Rig-Veda. In a letter to Rudolf of July 1821, Beethoven shows his belief in a personal God: "God ... sees into my innermost heart and knows that as a man I perform most conscientiously and on all occasions the duties which Humanity, God, and Nature enjoin upon me." On one of the sketches for the Missa solemnis he wrote "Plea for inner and outer peace". In this same regard, it is of further interest that when A. C. Kalischer posthumously published a volume on the personal letters of Beethoven, he was advised by the curators of the British Museum's Oriental Department to consult texts by the German-British philologist Max Müller for his translations of the Upanishads, as well as a German book on Indian Philosophy published at Jena in 1816, because "many sentences [were] very similar to those in the Beethoven document".

Beethoven's status was confirmed by the series of Concerts sprituels given in Vienna by the choirmaster Franz Xaver Gebauer in the 1819/1820 and 1820/1821 seasons, during which all eight of his symphonies to date, plus the oratorio Christus and the Mass in C, were performed. Beethoven was typically underwhelmed: when in an April 1820 conversation book a friend mentioned Gebauer, Beethoven wrote in reply "Geh! Bauer" (Begone, peasant!)

In 1819, Beethoven was first approached by the publisher Moritz Schlesinger, who won the suspicious composer round, while visiting him at Mödling, by procuring for him a plate of roast veal. One consequence of this was that Schlesinger secured Beethoven's three last piano sonatas and his final quartets; part of the attraction to Beethoven was that Schlesinger had publishing facilities in Germany and France, and connections in England, which could overcome problems of copyright piracy. The first of the three sonatas, for which Beethoven contracted with Schlesinger in 1820 at 30 ducats per sonata (further delaying completion of the Mass), was sent to the publisher at the end of that year (the Sonata in E major, Op. 109, dedicated to Maximiliane von Blittersdorf, Antonie Brentano's daughter).

Piano Sonata No. 32 in C minor, Op. 111
I. Maestoso – Allegro con brio ed appassionato

II. Arietta: Adagio molto semplice e cantabile
Performed by Artur Schnabel in 1932

In early 1821, Beethoven was once again in poor health with rheumatism and jaundice. Despite this, he continued work on the remaining piano sonatas he had promised to Schlesinger (the Sonata in A♭ major Op. 110 was published in December), and on the Mass. In early 1822 Beethoven sought a reconciliation with his brother Johann, whose marriage in 1812 had met with his disapproval, and Johann now became a regular visitor (as witnessed by the conversation books of the period) and began to assist him in his business affairs, including lending him money against ownership of some of his compositions. He also sought some reconciliation with the mother of his nephew, including supporting her income, although this did not meet with the approval of the contrary Karl. Two commissions at the end of 1822 improved Beethoven's financial prospects. In November the Philharmonic Society of London offered a commission for a symphony, which he accepted with delight, as an appropriate home for the Ninth Symphony on which he was working. Also in November Prince Nikolai Galitzin of Saint Petersburg offered to pay Beethoven's asking price for three string quartets. Beethoven set the price at the high level of 50 ducats per quartet in a letter dictated to his nephew Karl, who was then living with him.

During 1822, Anton Schindler, who in 1840 became one of Beethoven's earliest and most influential (but not always reliable) biographers, began to work as the composer's unpaid secretary. He later claimed that he had been a member of Beethoven's circle since 1814, but there is no evidence for this. Cooper suggests that "Beethoven greatly appreciated his assistance, but did not think much of him as a man".

=== 1823–1827: Final years ===
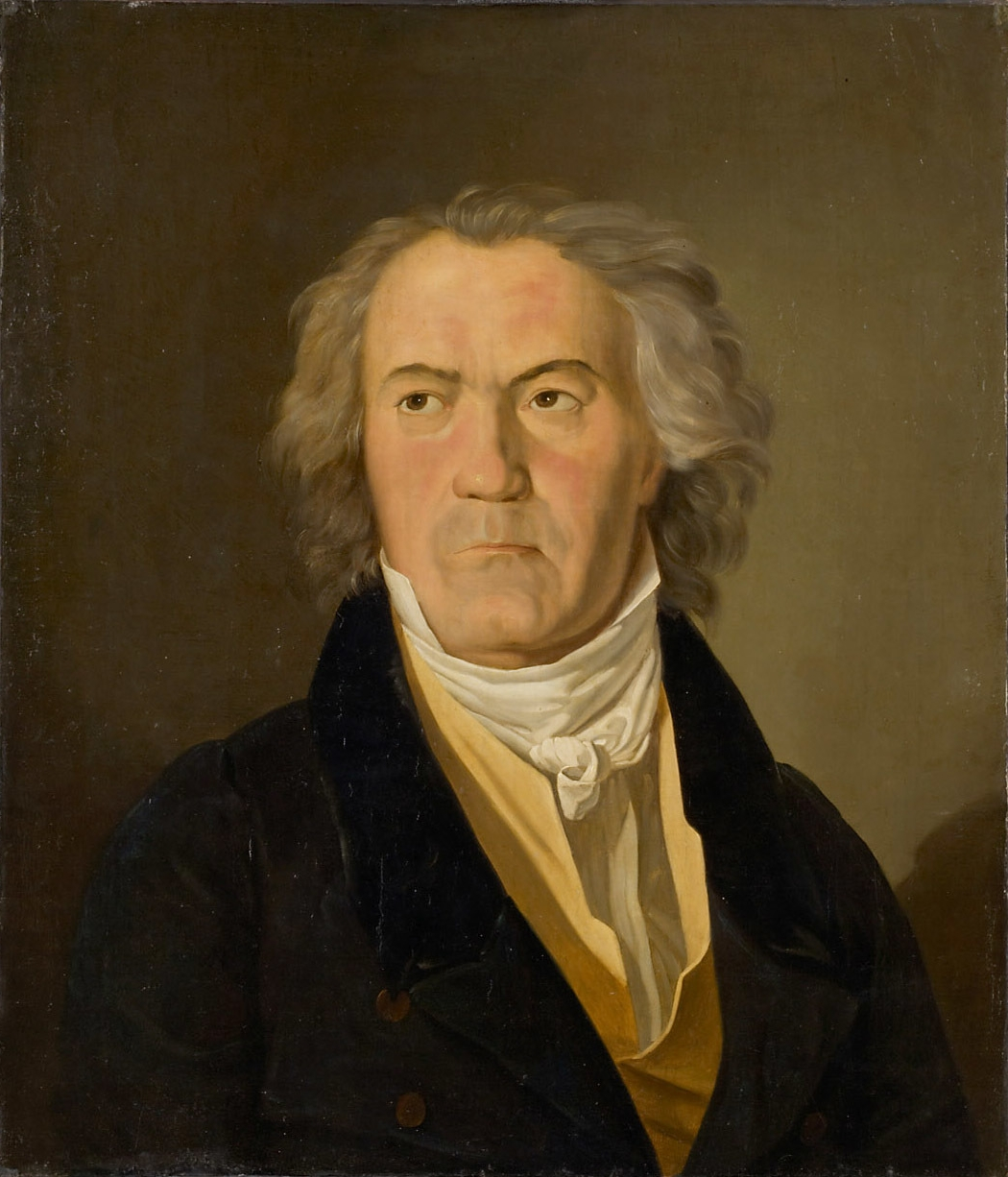
Beethoven (age 52) by Ferdinand Georg Waldmüller (1823)

The year 1823 saw the completion of three notable works, all of which had occupied Beethoven for some years: the Missa solemnis, the Ninth Symphony, and the Diabelli Variations.

Beethoven at last presented the manuscript of the completed Missa solemnis to Rudolph on 19 March (more than a year after the archduke's enthronement as archbishop). But he was in no hurry to get it published or performed as he had formed a notion that he could profitably sell manuscripts of the work to various courts in Germany and Europe at 50 ducats each. One of the few who took up this offer was Louis XVIII of France, who also sent Beethoven a heavy gold medallion. The Symphony and the variations took up most of the rest of Beethoven's working year. Diabelli hoped to publish both works, but the potential prize of the Mass excited many other publishers to lobby Beethoven for it, including Schlesinger and Carl Friedrich Peters. (In the end, it was obtained by Schotts).

Beethoven had become critical of the Viennese reception of his works. He told the visiting Johann Friedrich Rochlitz in 1822:

You will hear nothing of me here ... Fidelio? They cannot give it, nor do they want to listen to it. The symphonies? They have no time for them. My concertos? Everyone grinds out only the stuff he himself has made. The solo pieces? They went out of fashion long ago, and here fashion is everything. At the most, Schuppanzigh occasionally digs up a quartet.

He therefore inquired about premiering the Missa and the Ninth Symphony in Berlin. When his Viennese admirers learnt of this, they pleaded with him to arrange local performances. Beethoven was won over, and the symphony was first performed, along with sections of the Missa solemnis, on 7 May 1824, to great acclaim at the Kärntnertortheater. (Note: The first full performance of the Missa solemnis had already been given in St. Petersburg by Galitzin, who had been a subscriber for the manuscript 'preview' that Beethoven had arranged.) Beethoven stood by the conductor Michael Umlauf during the concert beating time (although Umlauf had warned the singers and orchestra to ignore him). Harold C. Schonberg writes that "the chorus had trouble singing the music and pleaded for the high notes to be taken down, just as the contralto soloist, Caroline Unger, also begged for changes. Beethoven refused ... The scherzo made a big impression however, and Unger turned Beethoven around to see the applause he could not hear."

The Allgemeine musikalische Zeitung gushed, "inexhaustible genius had shown us a new world", and Carl Czerny wrote that the Symphony "breathes such a fresh, lively, indeed youthful spirit ... so much power, innovation, and beauty as ever [came] from the head of this original man, although he certainly sometimes led the old wigs to shake their heads". The concert did not net Beethoven much money, as the expenses of mounting it were very high. A second concert on 24 May, in which the producer guaranteed him a minimum fee, was poorly attended; nephew Karl noted that "many people [had] already gone into the country". It was Beethoven's last public concert. Beethoven accused Schindler of either cheating him or mismanaging the ticket receipts; this led to the replacement of Schindler as Beethoven's secretary by Karl Holz, the second violinist in the Schuppanzigh Quartet, although by 1826 Beethoven and Schindler reconciled. The Missa was inscribed to Beethoven's foremost patron as well as pupil and friend. The copy presented to Rudolf was inscribed "Von Herzen—Möge es wieder—Zu Herzen gehn!" ("From the heart – may it return to the heart!")

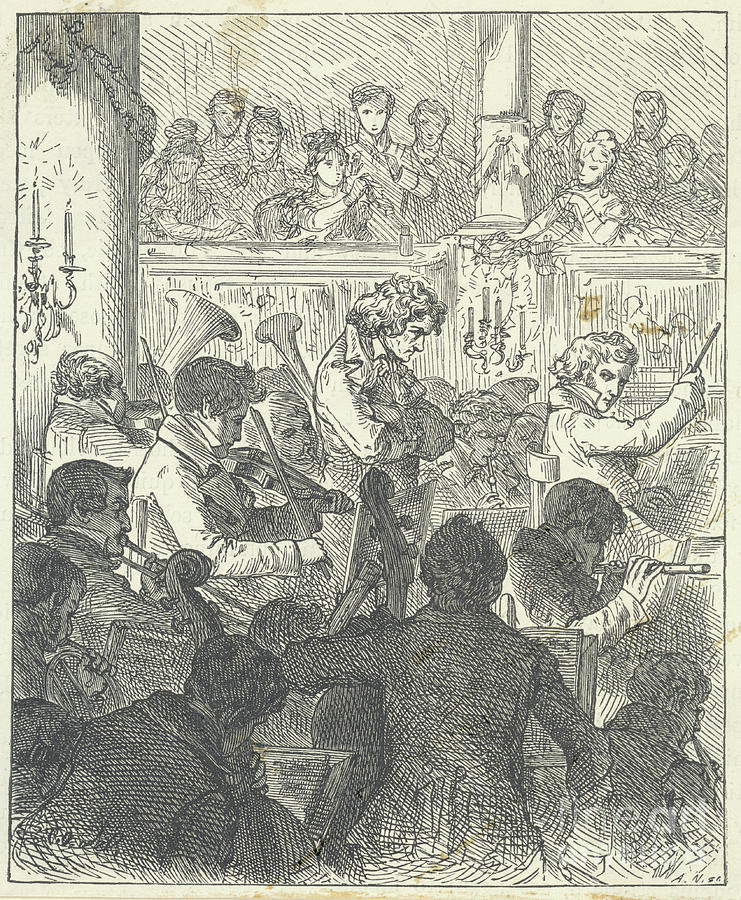
19th-century lithograph by Carl Offterdinger, depicting the premiere of the Ninth Symphony. Beethoven stands in the centre.

Beethoven then turned to writing the string quartets for Galitzin, despite failing health. The first of these, the String Quartet No. 12 was premiered by the Schuppanzigh Quartet in March 1825. While writing the next, the String Quartet No. 15, in April 1825, he was struck by a sudden illness. Recuperating in Baden, he included in the quartet its slow movement to which he gave the title "Holy song of thanks (Heiliger Dankgesang) to the Divinity, from a convalescent, in the Lydian mode". The next quartet to be completed was the String Quartet No. 13. In six movements, the last, contrapuntal movement proved very difficult for both the performers and the audience at its premiere in March 1826 (again by the Schuppanzigh Quartet). Beethoven was persuaded by the publisher Artaria to write a new finale, and to issue the last movement as a separate work (the Große Fuge, Op. 133). Beethoven's rated the String Quartet No. 14 as his most perfect single work.

Beethoven's relations with Karl had continued to be stormy; Beethoven's letters to him were demanding and reproachful. In August, Karl, who had been seeing his mother again against Beethoven's wishes, attempted suicide by shooting himself. He survived and after discharge from hospital went to recuperate in the village of Gneixendorf with Beethoven and his uncle Johann. In Gneixendorf, Beethoven completed the (Quartet in F major, Op. 135), which he sent to Schlesinger. Under the introductory slow chords in the last movement, Beethoven wrote in the manuscript "Muss es sein?" (Must it be?); the response, over the faster main theme of the movement, is "Es muss sein!" (It must be!). The whole movement is headed Der schwer gefasste Entschluss (The difficult decision). Following this in November Beethoven completed his final composition, the replacement finale for the Op. 130 quartet. Beethoven at this time was already ill and depressed; he began to quarrel with Johann, insisting that Johann make Karl his heir, in preference to Johann's wife. Submitting the late quartets to his publisher, Beethoven wrote "Thank God, there is less lack of imagination than ever before."

=== Death ===
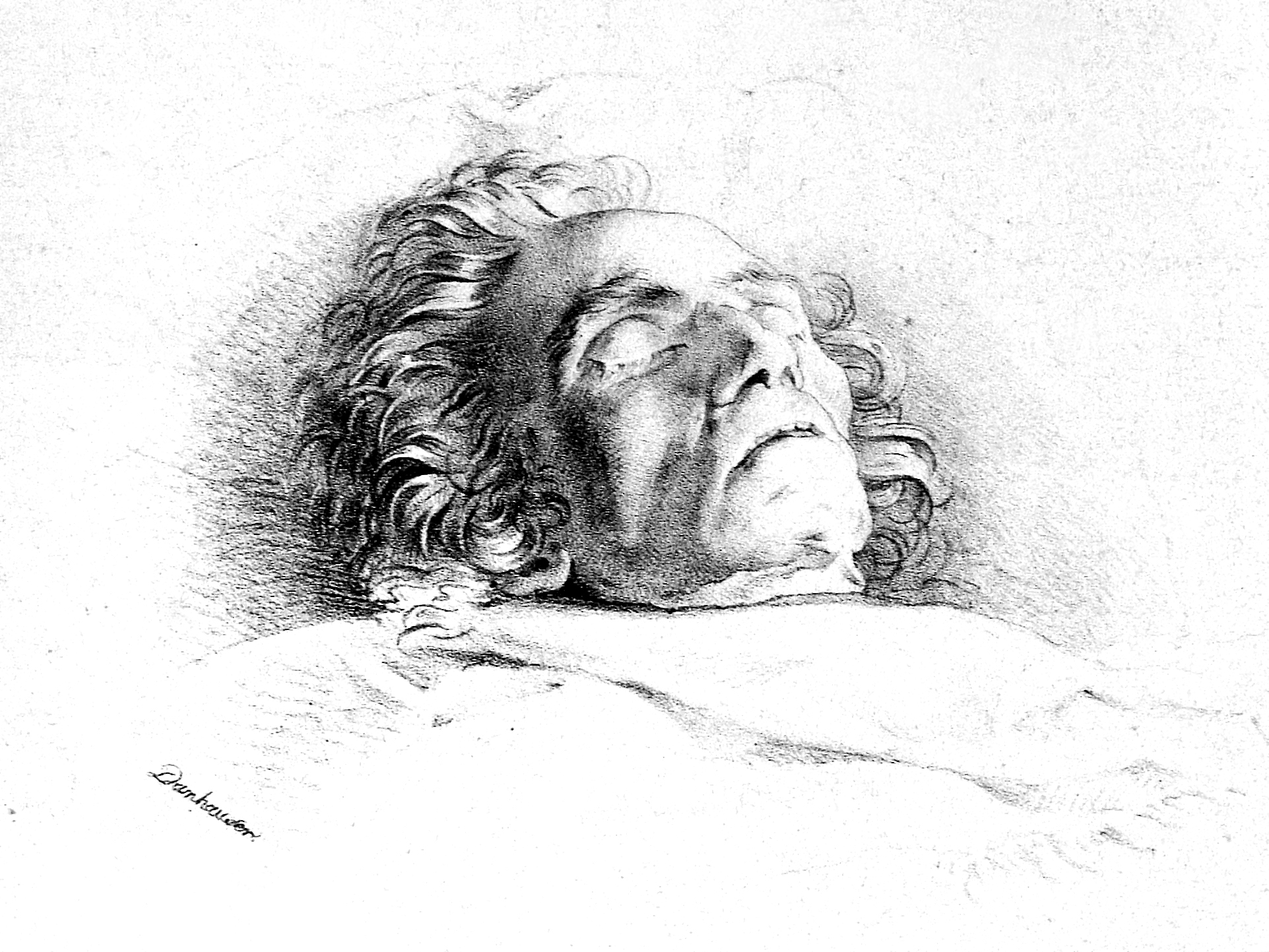
Beethoven (age 56) on his deathbed as depicted in a Josef Danhauser sketch (1827)

On his return journey to Vienna from Gneixendorf in December 1826, illness struck Beethoven again. He was attended until his death by Andreas Ignaz Wawruch, who throughout December noticed symptoms including fever, jaundice and dropsy, with swollen limbs, coughing and breathing difficulties. Several operations were carried out to tap off the excess fluid from Beethoven's abdomen. Karl stayed by Beethoven's bedside during December but left after the beginning of January to join the army at Iglau and did not see his uncle again, although he wrote to him shortly afterwards: "My dear father ... I am living in contentment and regret only that I am separated from you." Immediately following Karl's departure, Beethoven wrote a will making his nephew his sole heir.

Later, in January 1827, Beethoven was attended by Dr. Malfatti, whose treatment (recognizing the seriousness of his patient's condition) was largely centred on alcohol. As the news spread of the severity of Beethoven's condition, many old friends came to visit, including Diabelli, Schuppanzigh, Lichnowsky, Schindler, the composer Johann Nepomuk Hummel, and his pupil Ferdinand Hiller. Many tributes and gifts were also sent, including £100 from the Philharmonic Society in London and a case of expensive wine from Schotts. During this period, Beethoven was almost completely bedridden despite occasional efforts to rouse himself. On 24 March he was given the Last Rites by a Roman Catholic priest.

On 24 March 1827, he said to Schindler and the others present: "Plaudite, amici, comoedia finita est" ("Applaud, friends, the comedy is over"). Later that day, when the wine from Schotts arrived, he whispered: "Pity – too late."

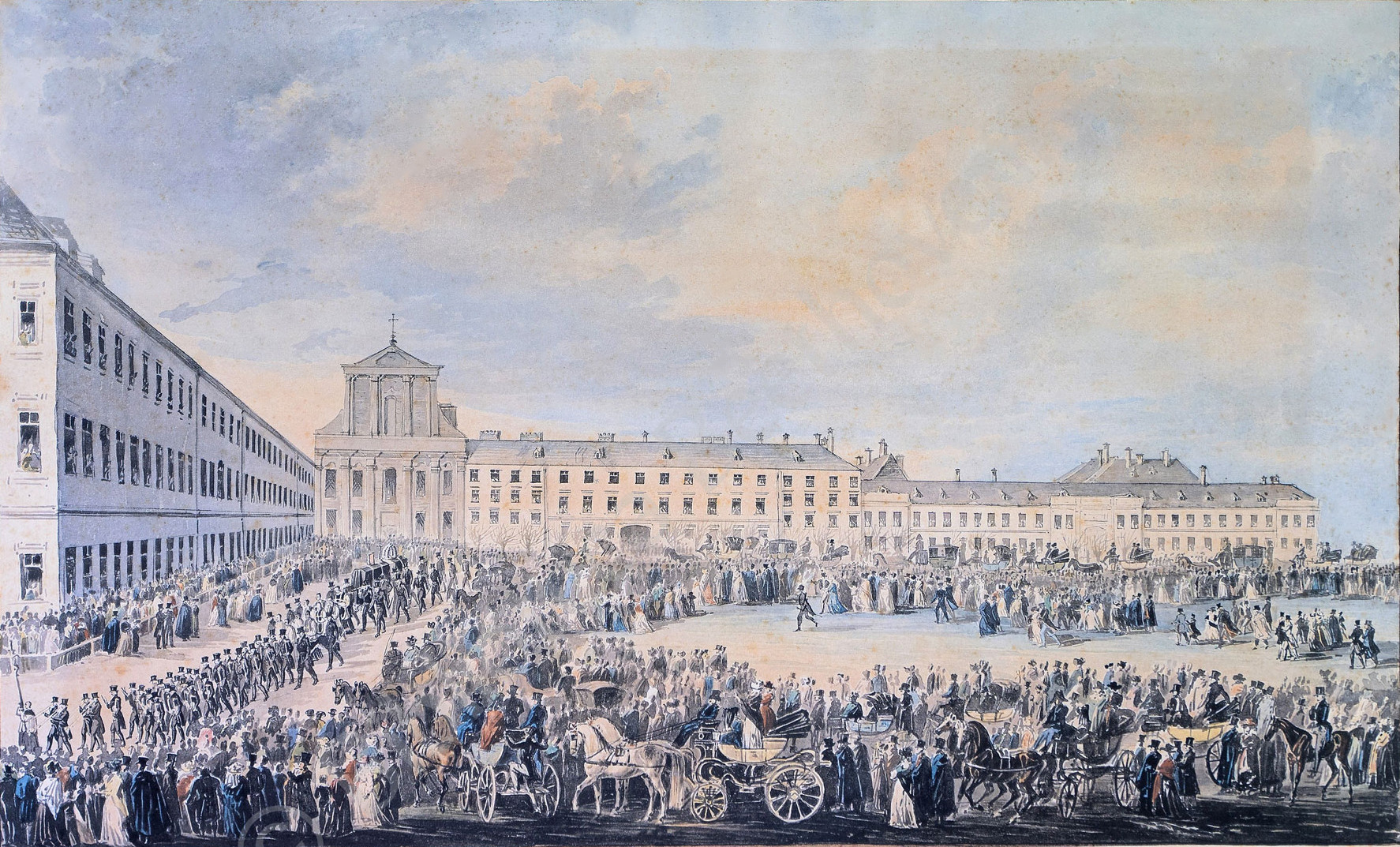
Beethoven's funeral procession (1827)

On 26 March 1827, Beethoven died at the age of 56; only his friend Anselm Hüttenbrenner and a "Frau van Beethoven" (possibly his old enemy Johanna van Beethoven) were present. According to Hüttenbrenner, at about 5 pm local time (17:00), there was a flash of lightning and a clap of thunder: "Beethoven opened his eyes, lifted his right hand and looked up for several seconds with his fist clenched ... not another breath, not a heartbeat more."

Many visitors came to the deathbed; some locks of the dead man's hair were retained by Hüttenbrenner and Hiller, among others. An autopsy revealed Beethoven had significant liver damage, which could have been due to his heavy alcohol consumption, and also considerable dilation of the auditory and other related nerves. (Note: There is dispute about the actual cause of his death: alcoholic cirrhosis, syphilis, infectious hepatitis, lead poisoning, sarcoidosis and Whipple's disease have all been proposed. Surviving locks of his hair have been subjected to additional analysis, as have skull fragments removed during an 1863 exhumation. Some of these analyses have led to controversial assertions that he was accidentally poisoned by excessive doses of lead-based treatments administered under instruction from his doctor.)

Beethoven's funeral procession in Vienna on 29 March 1827 was attended by an estimated 10,000 people. Franz Schubert and the violinist Joseph Mayseder were among the torchbearers. A funeral oration by the poet Franz Grillparzer (who would also write Schubert's epitaph) was read by the actor Heinrich Anschütz.

Beethoven was buried in the Währing cemetery, north-west of Vienna, after a requiem mass at the church of the Holy Trinity (Dreifaltigkeitskirche) on Alser Straße. Beethoven's remains were exhumed for study in 1863, and moved in 1888 to Vienna's Zentralfriedhof where they were reinterred in a grave adjacent to Schubert's.

== Music ==
=== The three periods ===
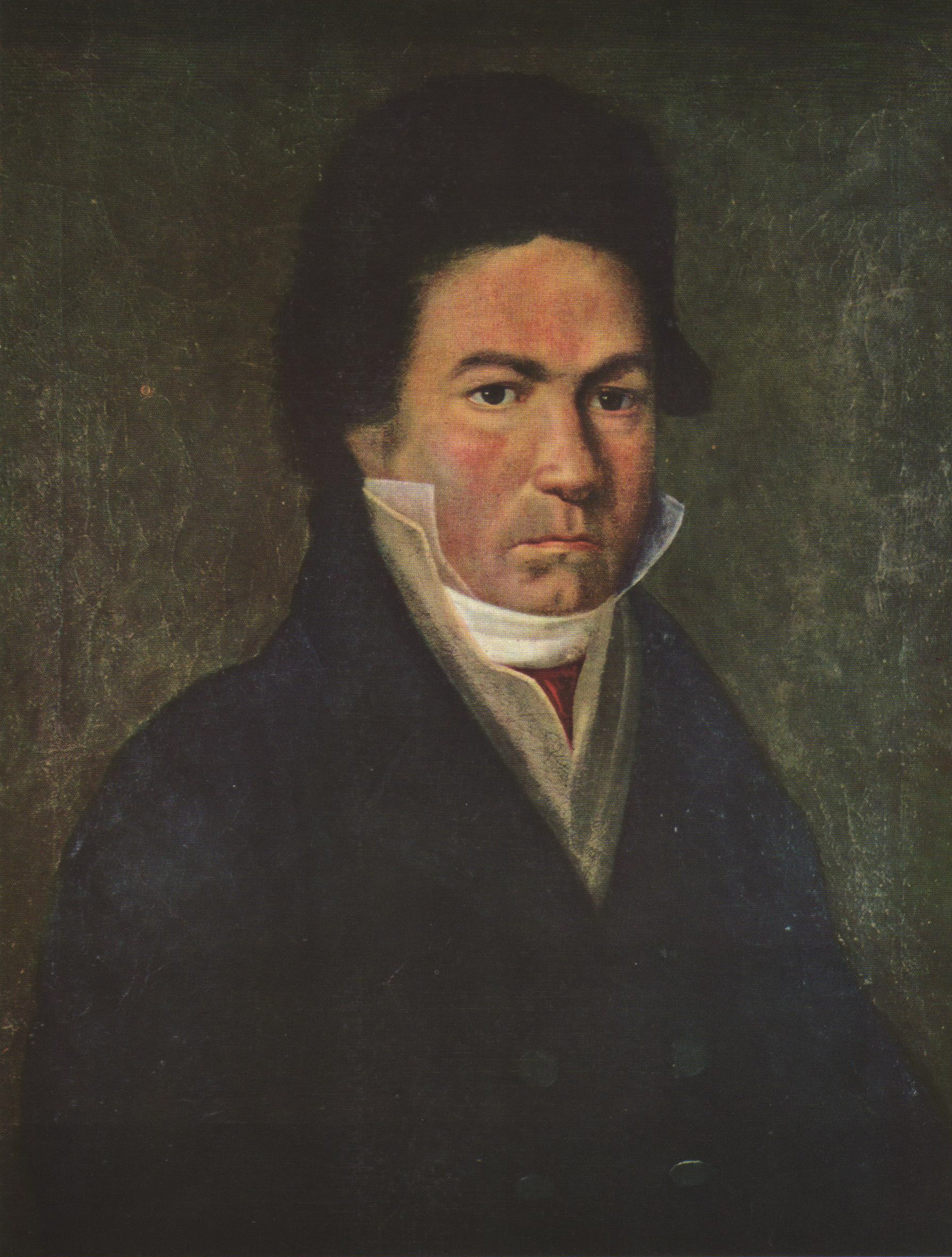
A portrait of Beethoven by Christoph Heckel, 1815

The historian William Drabkin notes that as early as 1818 a writer had proposed a three-period division of Beethoven's works and that such a division (albeit often adopting different dates or works to denote changes in period) eventually became a convention adopted by all of Beethoven's biographers, starting with Schindler, F.-J. Fétis and Wilhelm von Lenz. Later writers sought to identify sub-periods within this generally accepted structure. Its drawbacks include that it generally omits a fourth period, that is, the early years in Bonn, whose works are less often considered; and that it ignores the differential development of Beethoven's composing styles over the years for different categories of work. The piano sonatas, for example, were written throughout Beethoven's life in a progression that can be interpreted as continuous development; the symphonies do not all demonstrate linear progress; of all of the types of composition, perhaps the quartets, which seem to group themselves in three periods (Op. 18 in 1801–1802, Opp. 59, 74 and 95 in 1806–1814, and the quartets, today known as 'late', from 1824 onwards) fit this categorisation most neatly. Drabkin concludes that "now that we have lived with them so long ... as long as there are programme notes, essays written to accompany recordings, and all-Beethoven recitals, it is hard to imagine us ever giving up the notion of discrete stylistic periods."

=== Bonn 1782–1792 ===
Some forty compositions, including ten very early works written by Beethoven up to 1785, survive from the years that Beethoven lived in Bonn. It has been suggested that Beethoven largely abandoned composition between 1785 and 1790, possibly as a result of negative critical reaction to his first published works. A 1784 review in Johann Nikolaus Forkel's influential Musikalischer Almanack compared Beethoven's efforts to those of rank beginners. The three early piano quartets of 1785 (WoO 36), closely modelled on violin sonatas of Mozart, show his dependency on the music of the period. Beethoven did not give any of the Bonn works an opus number, except for those which he reworked for use later in his career, for example, some of the songs in his Op. 52 collection (1805) and the Wind Octet reworked in Vienna in 1793 to become his String Quintet, Op. 4. Charles Rosen points out that Bonn was something of a backwater compared to Vienna; Beethoven was unlikely to be acquainted with the mature works of Haydn or Mozart, and Rosen opines that his early style was closer to that of Hummel or Muzio Clementi. Kernan suggests that at this stage Beethoven was not especially notable for his works in sonata style, but more for his vocal music; his move to Vienna in 1792 set him on the path to develop the music in the genres he became known for.

=== First period ===
From the autograph score of the Piano Sonata No. 14

The conventional first period began after Beethoven's arrival in Vienna in 1792. In the first few years, he seems to have composed less than he did at Bonn, and his Piano Trios, Op. 1 were not published until 1795. From this point onward, he had mastered the 'Viennese style' of Haydn and Mozart and was making it his own. His works from 1795 to 1800 are larger in scale than was the norm (writing sonatas in four movements, not three, for instance); typically he uses a scherzo rather than a minuet and trio; and his music often includes extreme dynamics and tempi and chromatic harmony. It was this that led Haydn to believe the third trio of Op. 1 was too difficult for an audience to appreciate.

He also explored new directions and gradually expanded the scope and ambition of his work. Some important pieces of the early period are the First and Second symphonies, the String Quartets Nos. 1–6, Op. 18, the first two piano concertos, and the first twenty piano sonatas, including the famous Pathétique, Op. 13.

=== Middle period ===
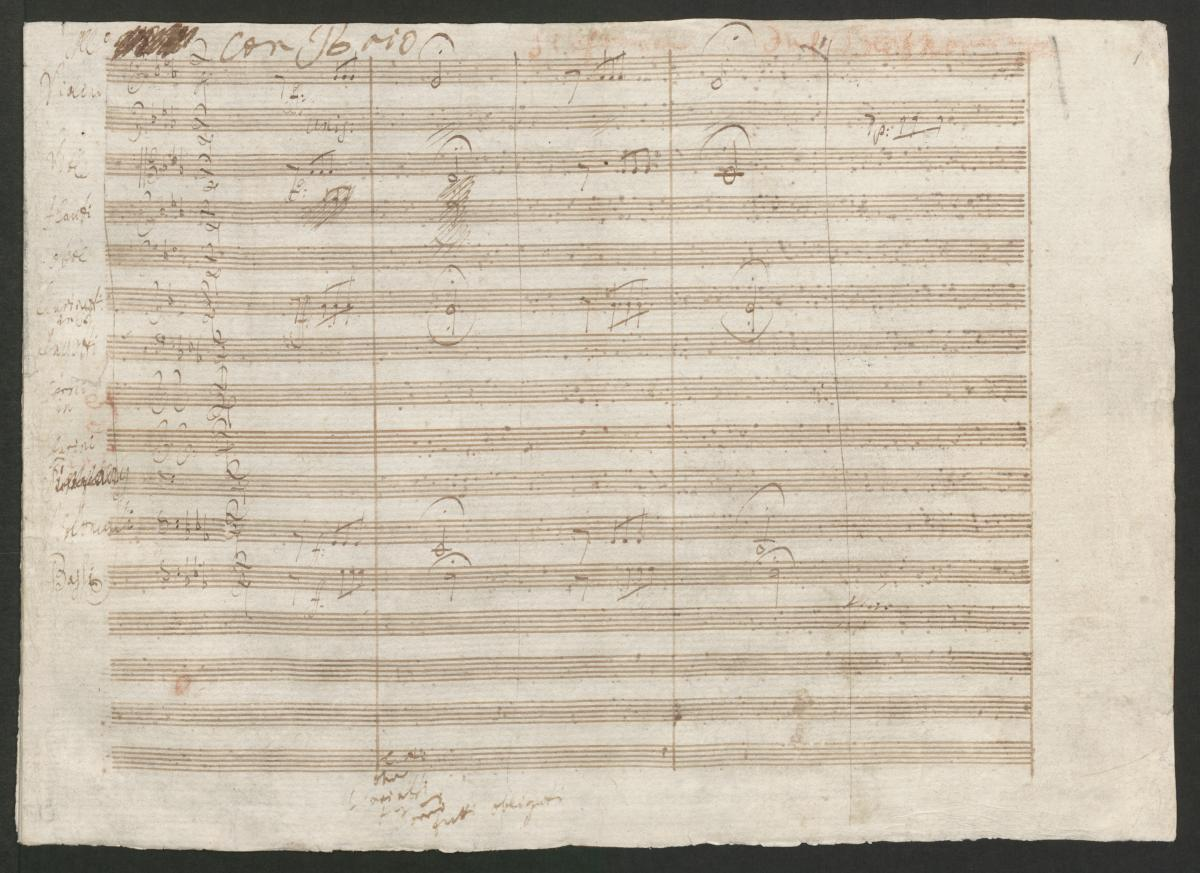
A holograph manuscript of Beethoven's Fifth Symphony, 1807.

His middle period began shortly after the personal crisis brought on by his recognition of encroaching deafness. It includes large-scale works that express heroism and struggle. Middle-period works include Symphonies 3–8, the last two piano concertos, the Triple Concerto and Violin Concerto, five string quartets (Nos. 7–11), several piano sonatas (including the Waldstein and Appassionata sonatas), the Kreutzer violin sonata and his opera, Fidelio.

This period is sometimes associated with a heroic manner of composing, but the use of the term "heroic" has become increasingly controversial in Beethoven scholarship. The term is more frequently used as an alternative name for the middle period. The appropriateness of the term heroic to describe the whole middle period has been questioned as well: while some works, like the Third (Eroica) and Fifth Symphonies, are easy to describe as heroic, many others, like his Symphony No. 6 (Pastoral) or his Piano Sonata No. 24, are not.

Schonberg notes that the Eroica was a landmark not only for Beethoven but for music: "a symphony longer than any previously written and much more difficult to play (it really was composed for an orchestra of the future); a symphony with complex harmonies; a symphony of titanic force; a symphony of fierce dissonances; a symphony with a funeral march that is paralyzing in its intensity."

=== Late period ===
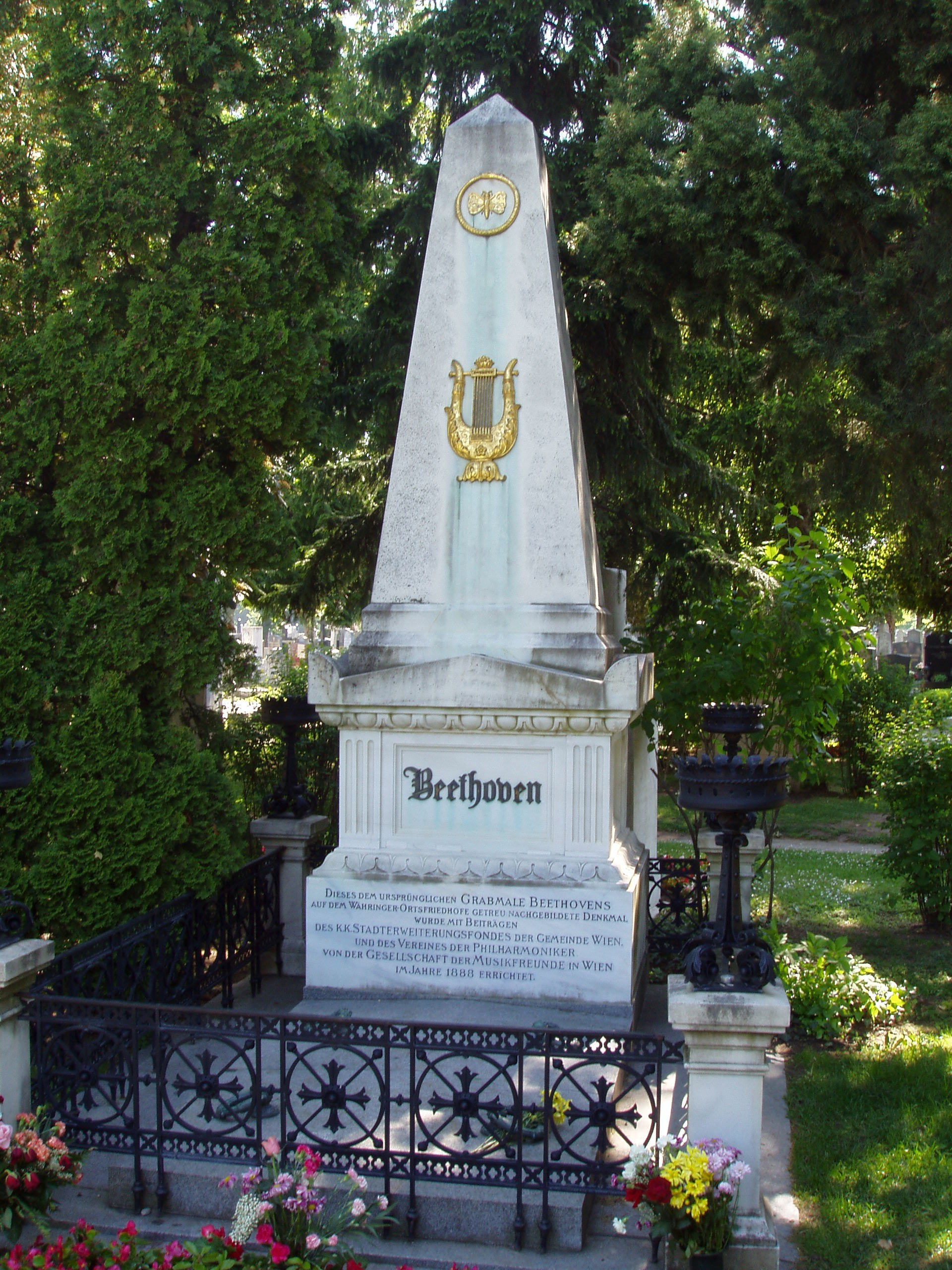
Beethoven's grave at Zentralfriedhof in Vienna

Beethoven's late period began in the decade 1810–1819. He began a renewed study of older music, including Gregorian chants and works by Palestrina, Bach, and George Frideric Handel, whom Beethoven considered "the greatest composer who ever lived". Beethoven's late works incorporated polyphony, church modes, and Baroque-era devices. For example, the overture The Consecration of the House (1822) included a fugue influenced by Handel.

A new style emerged, as he returned to the keyboard to compose his first piano sonatas in almost a decade. The works of the late period include the last five piano sonatas and the Diabelli Variations, the last two sonatas for cello and piano, the late string quartets (including the massive Große Fuge), and two works for very large forces: the Missa solemnis and the Ninth Symphony. Works from this period are characterised by their intellectual depth, their formal innovations, and their intense, highly personal expression. The String Quartet No. 14, Op. 131 has seven linked movements, and the Ninth Symphony adds choral forces to the orchestra in the last movement. Schonberg writes that "he had started as a composer in the classic tradition and had ended as composer beyond time and space, using a language that he himself had forged, a language compressed, cryptic and explosive, expressed in forms of his own devising."

=== Beethoven's pianos ===
Beethoven's earlier preferred pianos included those of Johann Andreas Stein; he may have been given a Stein piano by Count Waldstein. From 1786 onwards there is evidence of Beethoven's cooperation with Johann Andreas Streicher, who had married Stein's daughter Nannette. Streicher left Stein's business to set up his own firm in 1803, and Beethoven continued to admire his products, writing to him in 1817 of his "special preference" for his pianos.

Among the other pianos Beethoven possessed was an Érard piano given to him by the manufacturer in 1803. The Érard piano, with its exceptional resonance, may have influenced Beethoven's piano style – shortly after receiving it he began writing his Waldstein Sonata – but despite initial enthusiasm he seems to have abandoned it before 1810 when he wrote that it was "simply not of any use any more"; in 1824 he gave it to his brother Johann. (Note: The piano is now in the Oberösterreichisches Landesmuseum in Linz.)

In 1818, Beethoven received, also as a gift, a grand piano by John Broadwood & Sons. Although Beethoven was proud to receive it, he seems to have been dissatisfied by its tone (a dissatisfaction which was perhaps also a consequence of his increasing deafness), and sought to get it remodelled to make it louder. (Note: The piano is now in the Hungarian National Museum, Budapest, to which it was donated by Franz Liszt; it was restored to playing condition in 1991.) In 1825 Beethoven commissioned a piano from Conrad Graf, which was equipped with quadruple strings and a special resonator to make it audible to him, but it failed in this task. (Note: Now in the Beethoven-Haus, Bonn.)

== Legacy ==
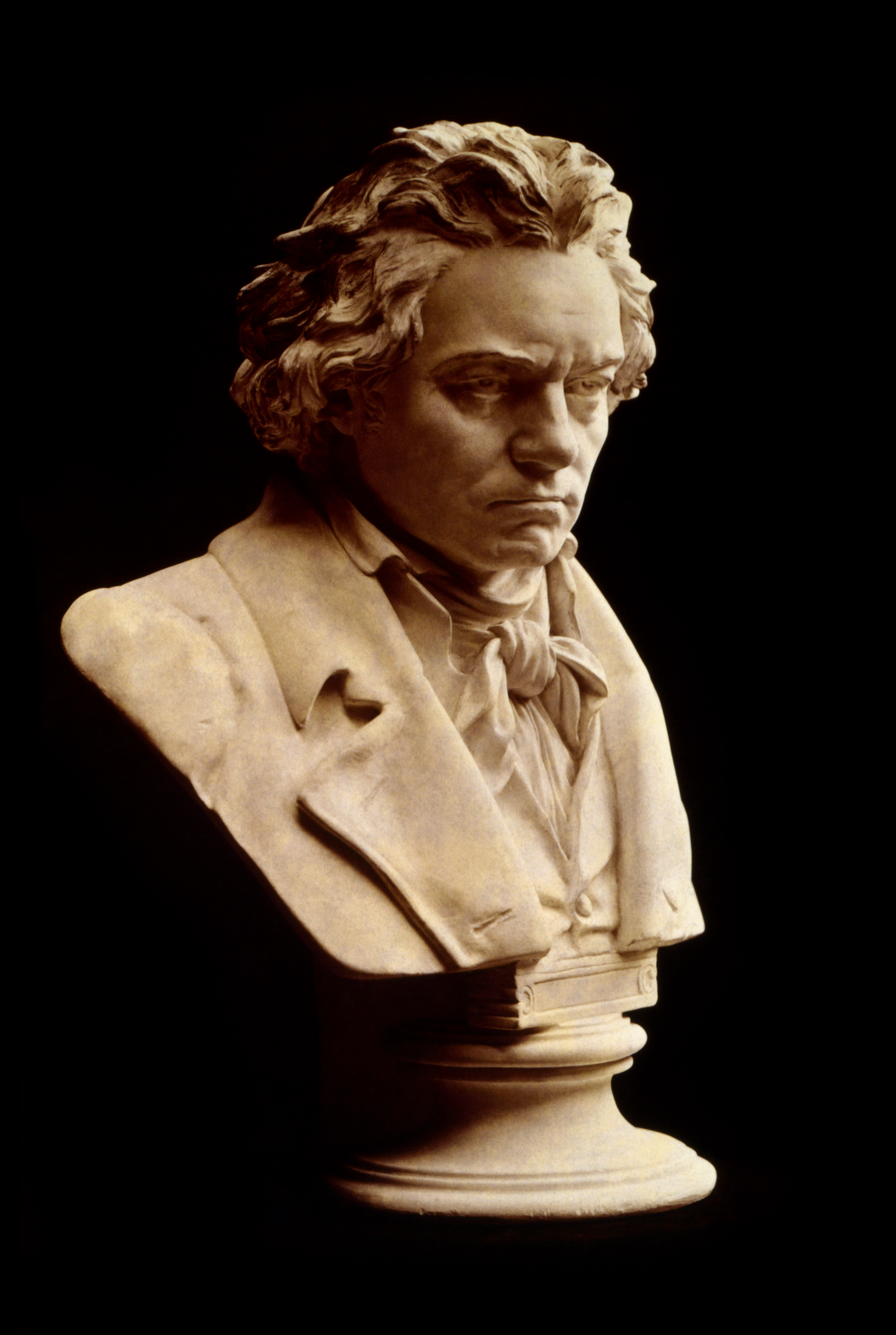
A bust of Beethoven by Hugo Hagen, 1892, Library of Congress in Washington, D.C.

=== Musical ===
Alex Ross writes "He not only left his mark on all subsequent composers but also molded entire institutions. The professional orchestra arose, in large measure, as a vehicle for the incessant performance of Beethoven's symphonies. The art of conducting emerged in his wake. The modern piano bears the imprint of his demand for a more resonant and flexible instrument. Recording technology evolved with Beethoven in mind: the first commercial 33⅓ r.p.m. LP, in 1931, contained the Fifth Symphony, and the duration of first-generation compact disks was fixed at seventy-five minutes so that the Ninth Symphony could unfurl without interruption. ... More than anything, the mesmerizing intricacy of Beethoven's constructions—his way of building large structures from the obsessive development of curt motifs—that made the repertory culture of classical music possible."

Beethoven was a key influence on the Romantic generation. Schonberg writes that "The Ninth Symphony was the Beethoven work that most influenced Berlioz and Wagner. ... To the Romantics, and many people today, the Ninth Symphony is something more than music. It is an ethos." Johannes Brahms's First Symphony quotes the "Ode to Joy" theme from the Ninth Symphony; Hans von Bülow dubbed it "Beethoven's Tenth".

Beethoven's having written nine symphonies was the original source of the so-called curse of the ninth, a superstition that composers were doomed to die before they could complete a tenth symphony.

=== Literary ===
Beethoven's life and work have inspired poets and novelists. T. S. Eliot's Four Quartets were heavily influenced by Beethoven's late quartets. Anthony Burgess's Napoleon Symphony is structured on the Eroica. Rita Dove's "Beethoven Returns to Vienna" imagines the composer confronting his deafness.

=== Museums ===
There is a museum, the Beethoven House, in the place of his birth in Bonn. Bonn has also hosted a musical festival, the Beethovenfest, since 1845. The festival was initially irregular but since 2007 has been organised annually.

Two museums in Vienna are devoted to Beethoven. The Beethoven Museum in Probusgasse is where he wrote the Heiligenstadt Testament and the first sketches for the Eroica symphony. The Pasqualatihaus (Mölker Bastei 8) was his most enduring place of residence in Vienna, and is where he wrote the final versions of his Symphonies Nos. 5 and 6.

The Ira F. Brilliant Center for Beethoven Studies, in the Dr. Martin Luther King Jr. Library, on the campus of San Jose State University, California, serves as a museum, research centre, and host of lectures and performances devoted solely to Beethoven's life and works.

=== Sculptures ===
Bonn's Beethoven Monument inwas unveiled in August 1845, in honour of the 75th anniversary of Beethoven's birth. Robert Schumann's Fantasie in C and Felix Mendelssohn's Variations sérieuses were originally conceived as contributions to the fundraising effort. The Beethoven Monument was the first statue of a composer created in Germany, and the music festival that accompanied the unveiling was the impetus for the swift construction of the original Beethovenhalle in Bonn (it was designed and built within less than a month, on the urging of Franz Liszt). Vienna honoured Beethoven with a statue in 1880.

=== Other ===
During World War II, the opening motif of Beethoven's Fifth Symphony, whose rhythm corresponds to dot-dot-dot-dash, "V" in Morse code, was used by the Allies to signify "victory," and the BBC played it at the beginning of wartime news broadcasts.

Bonn's principal orchestra is the Beethoven Orchester.

The Beethoven Quartet was a leading Soviet string quartet that premiered thirteen of Shostakovich's fifteen quartets.

The Beethoven Conservatory in St. Louis, Missouri, was named for the composer.

In 2001, Beethoven's manuscript of the Ninth Symphony became the first musical score added to the Memory of the World International Register established by UNESCO.

The Voyager Golden Record, a sample of the sights and sounds of Earth sent into space with the Voyager spacecraft, includes the first movement from the Fifth Symphony, played by the Philharmonia Orchestra conducted by Otto Klemperer. The record closes with the Cavatina from the String Quartet No. 13, played by the Budapest String Quartet.

=== Popular culture ===
Beethoven is the favorite composer of Alex, the antihero of the novel and movie A Clockwork Orange, and Beethoven's music figures prominently in the story and the film's soundtrack.

Beethoven is also the favorite composer of Schroeder in Charles Schulz's Peanuts. He frequently – if improbably – plays Beethoven on his toy piano. Schroeder lives in a house whose street address number is 1770 (the year Beethoven was born).

John Taylor, the hero of the acclaimed and popular BBC series Ludwig is obsessed with Beethoven, to the point of using the composer's first name as his pseudonym. The show's score consists largely of loose arrangements of Beethoven's music.
