= Beethoven (disambiguation) =

Ludwig van Beethoven (1770–1827) was a German composer and pianist.

Beethoven may also refer to:

== Arts and entertainment ==
- Beethoven (sculpture), a 1902 sculpture by Max Klinger
- Beethoven (film), a 1992 family film about a dog named Beethoven
  - Beethoven (franchise), a series of eight films
  - Beethoven (TV series), an animated show loosely based on the film
- Beethoven (band), a late 1980s band formed by former members of the Irish band Five Go Down to the Sea?
- "Beethoven (I Love to Listen To)", a 1987 song by Eurythmics
- "Beethoven" (song), by Union J
- "Roll Over Beethoven", a 1956 song by Chuck Berry

== Outer space ==
- Beethoven quadrangle, an area of the planet Mercury
  - Beethoven (crater), a crater within the quadrangle
- 1815 Beethoven, an asteroid

== People ==
- Johann van Beethoven (1740–1792), father of Ludwig van Beethoven
- Johanna van Beethoven (1786–1869), sister-in-law of Ludwig
- Kaspar Anton Karl van Beethoven (1774–1815), brother of Ludwig
- Ludwig van Beethoven the Elder (1712–1773), grandfather of Ludwig
- Beethoven Javier (1947–2017), Uruguayan football player
- Michael V. (Beethoven del Valle Bunagan, born 1969), Filipino television personality

== Other uses ==
- Beethoven (horse) (born 2007), a Thoroughbred racehorse
- Van Beethoven (train), a train linking Amsterdam and Bonn

== See also ==
- Bettenhoven, the ancestral village of the musical family
