= Abendlied unterm gestirnten Himmel =

1820 song by Ludwig van Beethoven

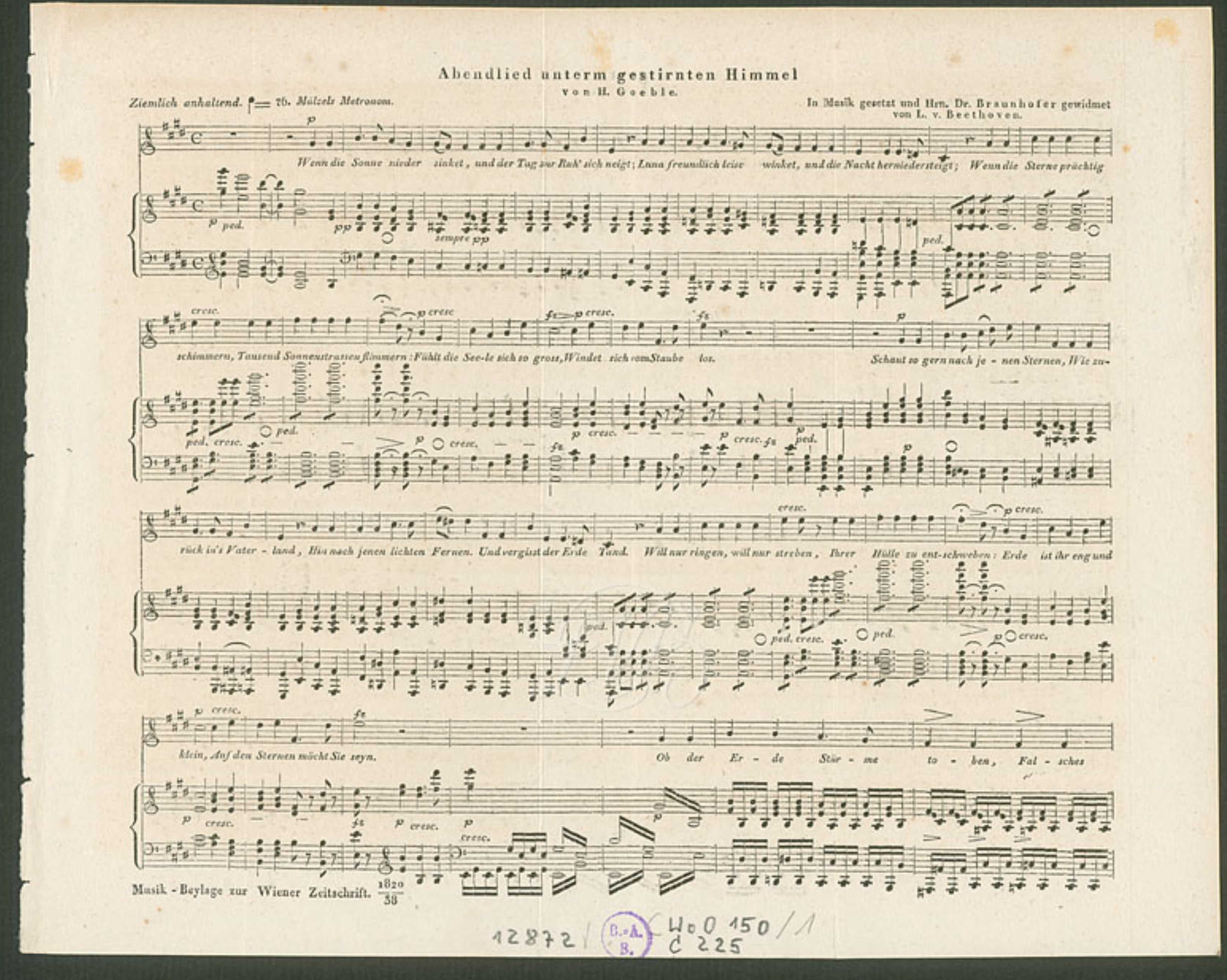
First page of the first printed edition, 1820

"Abendlied unterm gestirntem Himmel" (Evening song under the starry heaven), WoO 150, is a song for high voice and piano by Ludwig van Beethoven composed in 1820. The work is a setting of a poem believed to be by Otto Heinrich von Loeben, who wrote it under the pseudonym H. Goeble. Theodore Albrecht summarized the message of the song thus: it "describes the soul, after the sun has set, contemplating the starry heavens, longing to return there, and finally rising up to the heavenly light. The earthly witness realizes that his pilgrimage below will not last long, and that he too will soon soar above to his heavenly reward before God's throne." Barry Cooper has called the song "one of the finest examples of Beethoven's combination of simplicity and profundity that is so characteristic of his late style."

== Composition history ==
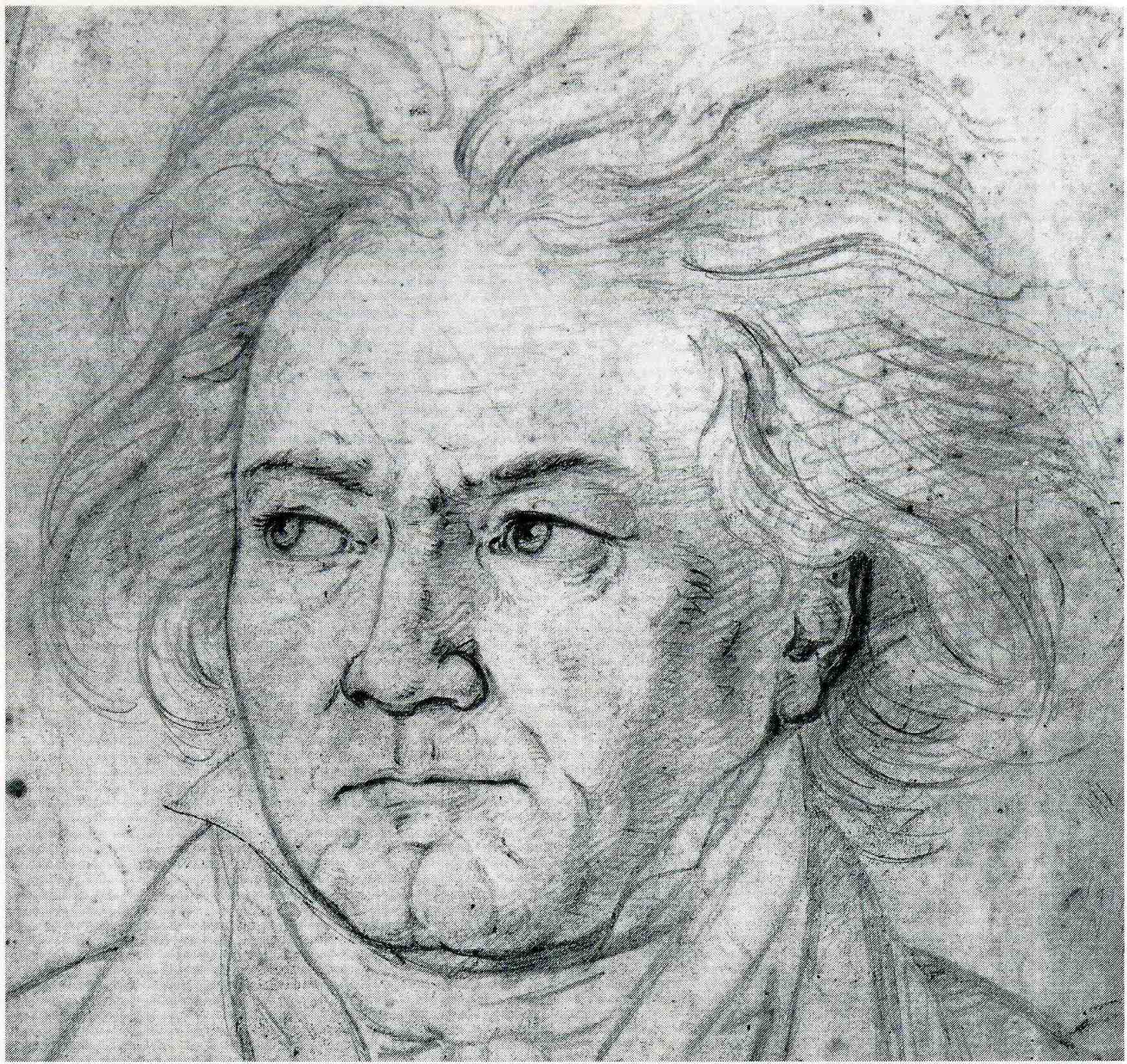
Beethoven as portrayed by August von Kloeber in 1818

In 1820, when Beethoven wrote "Abendlied", he was 49 years old. 1820 was a year in which the sorrows of his life (deafness, illness, failure to find a marriage partner) (Note: These are documented across the pages of Swafford (2014) and other biographies. Deafness had set in starting about 1798, and grew steadily worse; it was nearly total by 1820. Illness was very frequent, though its severity went up and down. Solomon (2001), ch. 15 provides a long list of women who, over the years, Beethoven approached, courted, or proposed to, in vain.) were augmented by the climactic phase of his legal confrontation with his sister-in-law Johanna van Beethoven over custody of his nephew (Johanna's son) Karl. The composition of "Abendlied" competed for Beethoven's time with the preparation of a massive (48-page) legal document intended to win this case. Cooper is led to speculate whether the consolatory message of the "Abendlied" poem, and its mention of evil foes, may have inclined Beethoven to set this text in song.

As was his practice, Beethoven made sketches for this work. A few of these survive, in a sketchbook that Beethoven employed from April 1819 to April 1820. The "Abendlied" sketches appear immediately after sketches for the Missa solemnis and precede sketches for what became the Op. 109 piano sonata. All of the surviving "Abendlied" sketch material consists of dead ends and none of it appears in the finished work.

A version of the song in Beethoven's own hand, now kept in the Austrian National Library, was dated by him 4 March 1820. According to Albrecht, this was not Beethoven's final version but an "advanced draft". Only the printed version reflects the composer's final intentions, for no other drafts or copies survive.

Beethoven dedicated the work to Dr. Anton Braunhofer (1780–1845), a physician and a professor at the University of Vienna. Braunhofer had treated both Beethoven and the composer's nephew Karl.

== Text ==
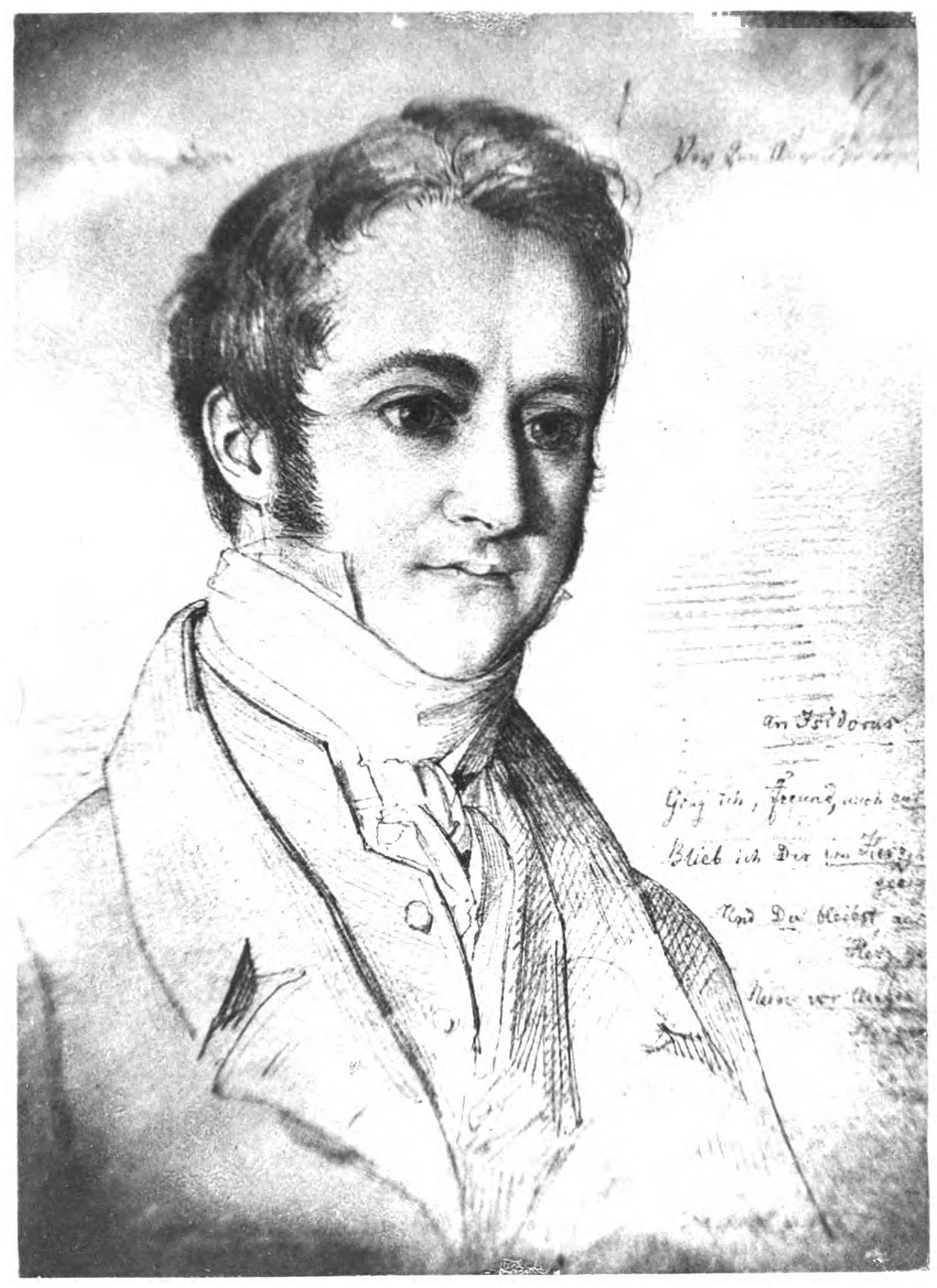
Otto Heinrich von Loeben, conjectured as the author of the text of "Abendlied". Portrait by Wilhelm Hensel

The title page of the song gives "H. Goeble" as the author of the verses. The identity of this poet was a mystery to scholars for many years; for example Cooper (2001) calls the poet "completely unknown". However, more recent research by Theodore Albrecht suggests a plausible candidate: Count Otto Heinrich von Loeben (1786–1825), using "Goeble" as a pseudonym. The basis of Albrecht's case is close parallels in autobiographical detail between the poems published by Loeben under his own name and those published by "Goeble". (Note: Albrecht's conjecture is accepted by the authorities of the Beethoven-Haus in Bonn and by Stroh (2012), Richter & Spahn (2020), p. 32, and Cheng (2020); but is regarded as an "alternative theory" by Pilcher (2012), p. 173.)

Count Loeben was the son of a high-ranking government official in Protestant Dresden. He originally studied law, but chose to pursue a literary career, publishing novels as well as poetry in various journals.

Loeben's poem was published in Vienna, under the "Goeble" pseudonym, a few months before Beethoven set it to music, in the Wiener allgemeine Theaterzeitung (May 11, 1819). Albrecht and Cooper suggest that Beethoven may have received the poem from a different source, however; see below.

The German words of the poem, with English translation, are given below.

Wenn die Sonne nieder sinket
Und der Tag zur Ruh sich neigt;
Luna freundlich leise winket,
Und die Nacht herniedersteigt;
Wenn die Sterne prachtig schimmern,
Tausend Sonnenstrassen flimmern;
Fühlt die Seele sich so gross,
Windet sich vom Staube los.

Schaut so gern nach jenen Sternen,
Wie zurück in's Vaterland,
Hin nach jenen lichten Fernen,
Und vergisst der Erde Tand;
Will nur ringen, will nur streben,
Ihrer Hülle zu entschweben
Erde ist ihr eng und klein,
Auf den Sternen möcht' sie sein.

Ob der Erde Stürme toben,
Falsches Glück den Bösen lohnt
Hoffend blicket sie nach oben,
Wo der Sternenrichter thront.
Keine Furcht kann sie mehr quälen,
Keine Macht kann ihr befehlen;
Mit verklärtem Angesicht
Schwingt sie sich zum Himmelslicht.

Eine leise Ahnung schauert
Mich aus jenen Welten an;
Lange, lange nicht mehr dauert
Meine Erdenpilgerbahn,
Bald hab' ich das Ziel errungen,
Bald zu euch mich aufgeschwungen,
Ernte bald an Gottes Thron
Meiner Leiden schönen Lohn.

When the sun sinks down
And the day tilts to its rest,
Luna beckons gently and kindly,
And the night descends;
When the stars gleam splendidly,
And a thousand sun-roads twinkle;
The soul feels so immense,
And wrenches free from the dust.

It gazes so gladly at those stars,
As if back to its fatherland,
Towards those distant lights,
And forgets all worldly trifles;
It wants only to struggle and strive
To soar away from its mortal frame:
The world is too narrow and small,
Among the stars it longs to be.

Though earth's storms are raging,
And false fortune rewards the evil,
Full of hope it looks upwards
Where the Star-judge sits enthroned.
No fear can torment it any longer,
No power can command it;
With transfigured countenance
It soars upward toward the heavenly light.

A gentle hint thrills
Me from those worlds;
Not much longer will last
My earthly pilgrimage.
Soon I shall have reached the goal,
Soon soared up to you,
I will reap at God's throne
The beautiful reward of my earthly sorrows.

The poem employs standard principles of German versification. Its meter is trochaic tetrameter, with four falling feet per line. Half of the lines are catalectic, meaning they leave off the final stressless syllable and thus have seven syllables total instead of the normal eight. The rhyme scheme of each stanza is ABABCCDD, where lines marked B or D are catalectic.

== Music ==
Beethoven composed the song in E major, a key that William Kinderman suggests "was associated by Beethoven with work of a reflective, elevated, and often ethereal or religious character". (Note: Source: Kinderman (2009), p. 263. As illustrations Kinderman mentions three instrumental slow movements in E major, from the second "Razumovsky" quartet, the Piano Sonata opus 2 no. 3, and the Third Piano Concerto. He also mentions various songs and the variation finale of the Piano Sonata Op. 109 (composed at the same time as "Abendlied").) The vocal line best fits a high voice (tenor or soprano), though in concerts and recordings it has also been sung by lower voices in transposition.

Beethoven's intended tempo is very moderate, as indicated both by his direction "ziemlich anhaltend" ("rather sustained"), as well as a metronome marking specifying = 76. (Note: The metronome was new at the time and the first edition of the song actually mentions its champion, Johann Nepomuk Maelzel, who was for a time a friend of Beethoven.) A performance at this tempo lasts about five minutes.

Beethoven's musical setting is basically in strophic form; there is a single melody that is sung four times, once for each verse of the poem. However, in no two verses does the melody take exactly the same form; and Cooper (2001), in his published description of the song, describes how Beethoven reshapes his melody in various ways to fit the words of each verse.

As Cooper notes, the piano accompaniment is also varied from stanza to stanza; especially for the fifth and sixth lines of each stanza. In the first, second, and final stanzas, the accompaniment for these lines consists of repeated chordal triplets, which for Cooper evoke the twinkling of stars; but in the third stanza, which depicts the rising soul immune to all adversity, the corresponding lines are set to powerful chords in dotted rhythm.

The song ends with a brief coda, with text Beethoven modified from the last two verse lines. In the final notes, the piano alone repeats the last notes of the singer's part, sempre pianissimo, "always very soft".

== Publication ==
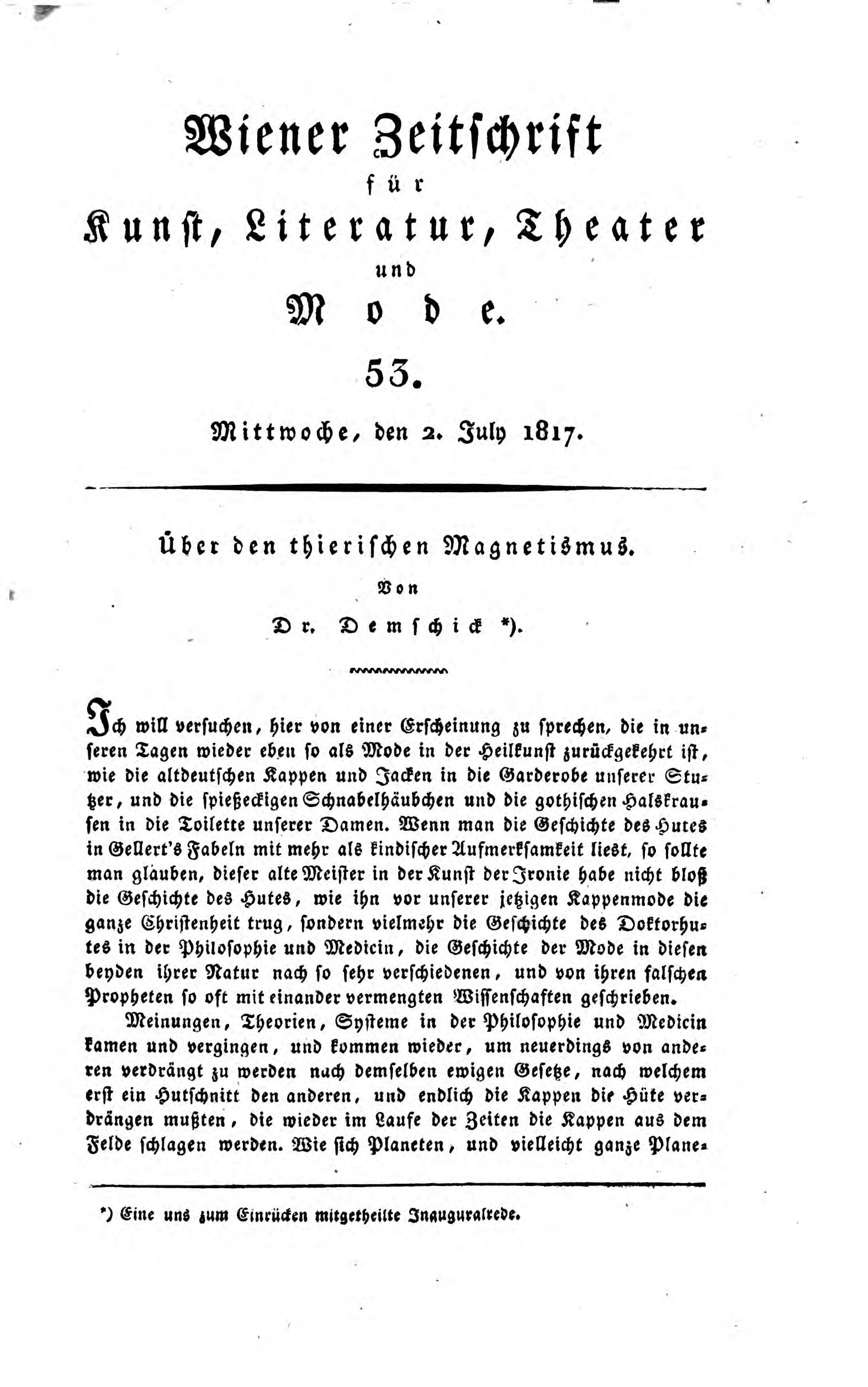
Front page of the Wiener Zeitschrift for 2 July 1817. The cover article is about animal magnetism.

"Abendlied" was first printed in a magazine of Beethoven's time, the Wiener Zeitschrift für Kunst, Literatur, Theater und Mode (Viennese journal of art, literature, theater, and fashion), founded 1816, as a supplement to their issue of 28 March 1820. At the time, it was not uncommon for magazines to include musical supplements, intended for their readers to perform and enjoy in their homes. The editor of the journal, Johann Schickh (1770–1835), had already published three Beethoven songs as supplements; (Note: "Das Geheimnis" (1816), "So oder so" (1817), and "Resignation" (1818)) and the Wiener Zeitschrift went on to publish Franz Schubert's now-famous song "Die Forelle" (December 1820) as well as eleven other Schubert songs. The magazine also published poetry, including a number of (attributed) poems by Count Loeben, the apparent author of "Abendlied". The story behind the magazine's solicitation of the song is unusually well documented, since by 1820 Beethoven's hearing had become so feeble that he used conversation books (still preserved) to allow people to communicate with him.

Editor Schickh urged Beethoven to provide songs and other material for his journal, and at least once he provided Beethoven with a pile of sheets of poetry, hoping to assist by providing a poem that would appeal to him. Both Albrecht and Cooper suggest that Beethoven discovered "Abendlied" by reading through the pile.

Editor Schickh was also in contact with Loeben, which whom he worked by correspondence. It appears that Loeben knew Beethoven's work and indeed yearned for the glory of having one of his poems set by him; thus Schickh writes in Beethoven's conversation books, "How is it then with my Lieder [songs]? Shall I have the pleasure of receiving some from you? Count Loeben is plaguing me about it, and would be very honored to be immortalized through you." Schickh probably did not divulge to Beethoven Loeben's identity as author of "Abendlied". (Note: In particular, in conversation with the pianist Joseph Czerny, Beethoven seems to have asked him if he knew who Goeble was, receiving the reply "There is also a Gebel who is a painter." (referring to Carl Peter Goebel))

Albrecht (2012) discusses Beethoven's motivation for providing Schickh with a song. Most obviously, he received his normal fee of eight ducats, and continued a useful business relationship (which included a free subscription). Another reason may have been that Beethoven decided to take Schickh's side in a power struggle at the journal, pitting Schickh against Joseph Carl Bernard, a Bohemian-born journalist who had been commissioned by the Gesellschaft der Musikfreunde to write an oratorio libretto for Beethoven. Albrecht suggests that Bernard was bigoted against several groups of people – Protestants, female intellectuals, and Jews – and he freely shared his offensive views in conversations with Beethoven. It was shortly after Bernard shared a particularly unpleasant anti-Semitic story with Beethoven that the composer commenced work on the song that Schickh had been hoping for; he also cut back on his interactions with Bernard. Albrecht suggests that Beethoven had simply had enough of Bernard's remarks.

Beethoven's conversation books for the days before "Abendlied" was published provide a vivid picture of the process by which his creations were rendered in print (Note: The process is discussed in detail in Tyson (1971).) — even though we see only Schickh's side of the conversations (Beethoven usually contributed to a conversation orally). The editor patiently addresses Beethoven's concerns about getting an accurate hand copy made, about the chosen printer, and about fixing typos in the proofs ("All of these marks will be removed. The man is correcting all of these printing errors."). On Schickh's side, it was a matter of concern to keep Beethoven's perfectionism from leading him to miss the deadline ("But it must come out tomorrow; it was already announced. The corrections can definitely be finished in a half hour. Then it will go swiftly, and there's no reason why it cannot come out tomorrow. They run the presses at night as they do during the day.") In the end, the song was indeed printed overnight, just making the deadline for the 30 March issue of the Wiener Zeitschrift.

A later, possibly pirated, edition appeared in February 1823, issued by a Vienna firm, Sauer & Leidesdorf. (Note: The edition included three other songs Beethoven had published in the Wiener Zeitschrift; it may be viewed at the web site of the Beethoven House, Bonn. For whether the work was authorized by Beethoven, see Cooper (2001), pp. 247–248, who expresses doubt, and this site, whose author judges that the work was pirated; both are interpreting a conversation between Beethoven and Schenckh that took place after the edition appeared.)

Beethoven assigned no opus number to "Abendlied", following his consistent practice for the fifteen works that he published in magazines. The WoO 150 number that identifies the song (WoO = Werk ohne Opuszahl, work without opus number) was assigned much later (1955) in the Beethoven catalog created by Georg Kinsky and Hans Halm.

== Critical opinion ==
The pianist Graham Johnson, who has recorded the work, admires how Beethoven creates his effects from very modest resources: "This is music of unaccountable majesty; any other composer would make something banal out of these rather ordinary chord progressions dressed up in rather hackneyed throbbing triplets. And yet, seemingly as a result of sheer willpower, the composer has created something worthy of these exalted poetic images—he conjures a vista of sound with the broadest horizons."

Barry Cooper relates the song to the composer's own life and feelings: "'Abendlied' is exceptionally rich in concepts that had great significance for Beethoven — indeed almost every line of the poem bears direct or indirect relevance to some of his own deepest thoughts and desires. By making a musical setting of it, he was able to meditate at length on each of its phrases, and the profundity of his meditations is reflected in the subtlety with which he follows every nuance of the text."

Beethoven's younger contemporary Franz Schubert made a copy of the song, transposed down to D major. Graham Johnson conjectures that the copy was intended for performance with Schubert's friend and collaborator, the baritone Johann Michael Vogl.

=== God beyond the stars ===
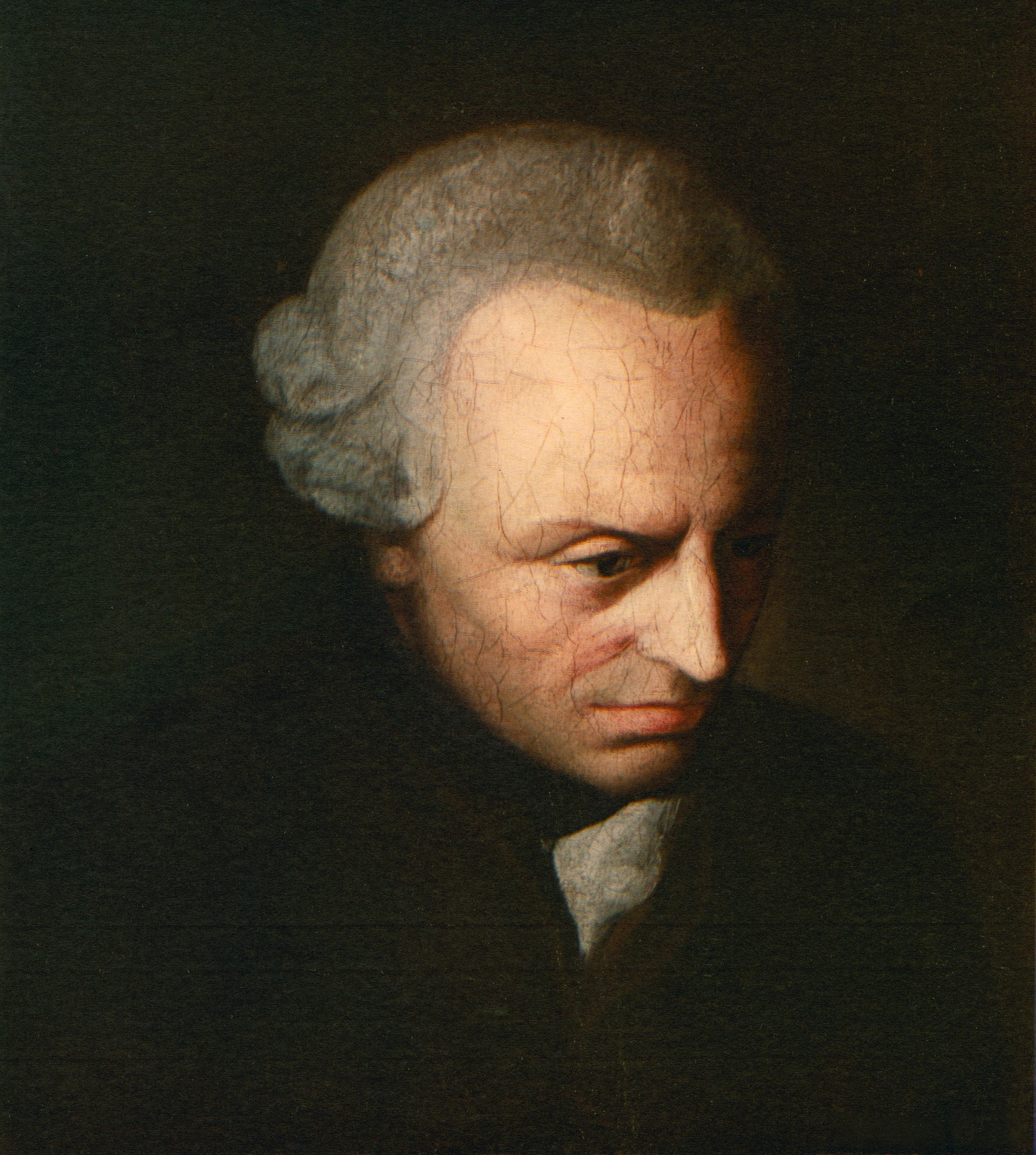
The philosopher Immanuel Kant; anonymous portrait from about 1790

Loeben's poem includes the line "Wo der Sternenrichter thront"; literally "Where the star-judge is enthroned". This reflects a religious belief shared by Beethoven and mentioned by Beethoven scholars: that there is a just God who dwells among or beyond the stars. Cooper notes that "Beethoven is reported to have loved gazing at the stars, and according to Czerny was inspired to write the slow movement of the second 'Razumovsky' quartet by doing so." (Note: Cooper (2001), p. 242. As noted above, the movement is composed in E major, like "Abendlied".) Beethoven said much the same to his friend and secretary Karl Holz, who later reported that "the Adagio [of the quartet] was inspired on a night when 'the clear stars illuminated the heavens', and Beethoven, wandering through the fields of grain near Baden, glanced upward 'questioningly, longingly, into the infinite expanse'."

The idea of a God beyond the stars was invoked by another poet, Friedrich Schiller, in his famous Ode to Joy:

Ahnest du den Schöpfer, Welt?
Such' ihn über'm Sternenzelt!
Über Sternen muß er wohnen.

Do you sense your Creator, O world?
Seek Him above the canopy of stars!
He must dwell beyond the stars.

This passage was later set to music by Beethoven in the Ninth Symphony.

As Cooper notes, the connection of the starry canopy with a just God, and by extension with the human moral sense, can be found in an item Beethoven read shortly before composing "Abendlied"; it comes from the work of the philosopher Immanuel Kant (1724–1804). Beethoven was evidently reading the 1 February 1820 issue of the Wiener Zeitschrift (probably his own copy; see above), and encountered, at the end of an astronomy article, a paraphrase of a famous saying by Kant, taken from his Critique of Practical Reason: "Two things fill my mind with ever-increasing wonder and awe: ... the starry heavens above me and the moral law within me." (Note: The passage is widely quoted (e.g. in web compilations of Kant's sayings), and is inscribed on the philosopher's tombstone.) Beethoven was moved to jot down the paraphrase in a conversation book, with emphasis: "'The moral law within us, and the starry sky above us' Kant!!!"

=== Musical pictorialism ===
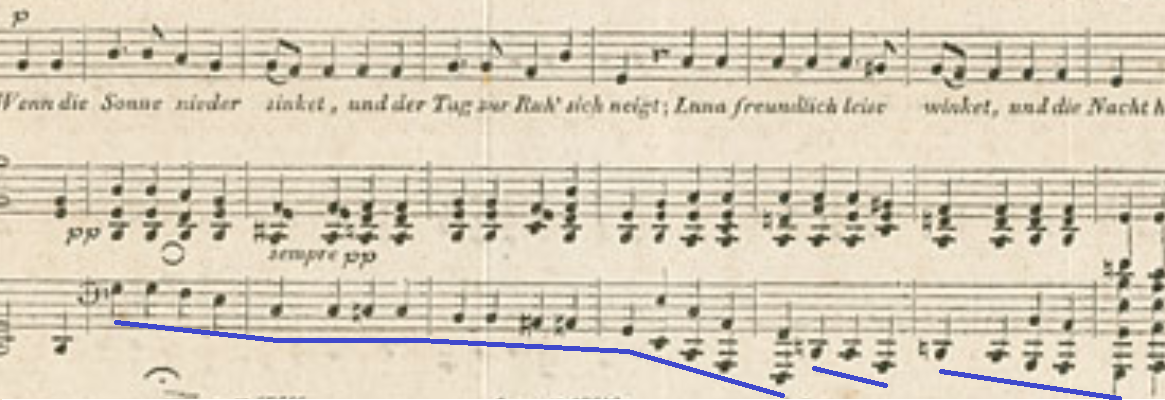
The descending bass line for the setting sun remarked on by Youens. Beethoven shifts up an octave twice as the bass line descends below the range of his keyboard.

Youens (2009) suggests that Beethoven uses particular musical patterns pictorially. Thus, where the singer has "Wenn die Sonne nieder sinket," the piano part includes a "bass sinking downwards like the setting sun".

At the second musical phrase, the piano part breaks into triplet chords, suggested by Cooper (2001) to depict the twinkling of the stars. Youens describes the same passage: "at the first invocation of the shimmering stars, the musical cosmos is filled with pulsating, full-textured chords traveling in a majestic circle of fifths. This is the music of the spheres, and its pulsations [will] recur, gloriously, in the last song of An die ferne Geliebte and elsewhere in Beethoven's oeuvre." (Note: Youens's remark can be fleshed out from comments by other authors. Hirschberg (1928), pp. 9–10 points out the starry reference in the last song of An die ferne Geliebte: bars 17–25, where the music has triplet chords in the piano part, while the lyrics describe the last moments of a fading sunset — per Hirschberg, "the twinkling of the first stars". For Youens's "elsewhere", a likely passage is in the Ninth Symphony, last movement, bars 612–625, where, with shimmering triplet accompaniment, the chorus sings the line from Schiller quoted above, "über Sternen muss er wohnen," "he must dwell above the stars". This example is noticed both by Hirschberg and by Lodes (2000), p. 332, who in addition notices a passage from the much earlier Adelaide (1795) in which the chordal triplets accompany the words "im Gefilde der Sterne"; "in the realm of the stars".)

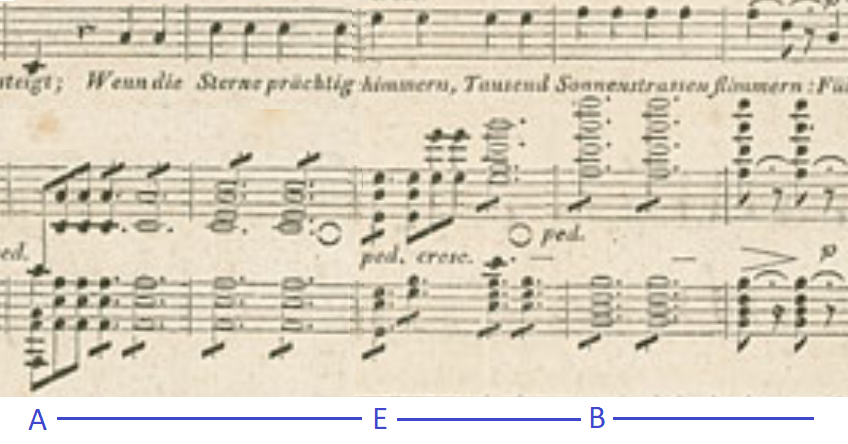
The shining stars, expressed in triplets (Cooper). The harmony rises by fifths: A–E–B.

At the very end of "Abendlied", performed by the piano alone, the treble and bass notes are widely separated. John Palmer suggests, "The great space between the right and left hands at the final chord of the song suggests the distance between earthly and heavenly realms." Leslie Orrey also hears the final right-hand notes as a portrayal of heaven, and notes it as an influence on the later music of Franz Liszt.

=== Effortful performance in Beethoven's music ===
"Abendlied" requires the singer four times to execute a crescendo on high F#, culminating in the same pitch sung on a fermata. This is something concert singers can do, but even so, the tenor Mark Padmore and his pianist partner Julius Drake, in a joint interview, make it clear that the song is not entirely easy even for professionals — and that a sense of effort is part of their approach to performing the song.

[Padmore] went on to speak of the way Beethoven is insistent with his musical material, that a song such as "Abendlied unterm gestirnten Himmel" consistently sits up "at the top of the voice"; of the way that Beethoven "keeps going with a musical idea; it doesn't matter how hard it is, if it breaks a string on a piano or fiddle, there is a raw power that is glorious. Nothing stops Beethoven." Beethoven knew he was pushing boundaries, Drake continued: "Some things are impossible" but Beethoven is asking for music of such intensity, and is so genuine, "his longing for what he wants is so honest" that performers are compelled to try to fulfil his wishes.
