= Karl van Beethoven =

Nephew of Ludwig van Beethoven

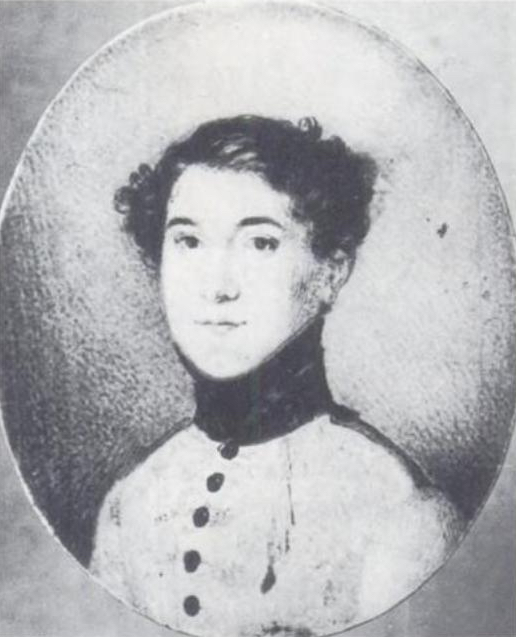
- Born: Karl van Beethoven; 4 September 1806; Vienna, Austrian Empire
- Died: 13 April 1858 (aged 51); Vienna, Austrian Empire
- Spouse: Caroline Naske
- Children: Karoline Johanna; Marie Anna; Ludwig Johann; Gabriele; Hermine
- Parent(s): Kaspar Anton Karl van Beethoven; Johanna van Beethoven
- Relatives: Ludwig van Beethoven (paternal uncle); Nikolaus Johann van Beethoven (paternal uncle); Johann van Beethoven (paternal grandfather); Maria Magdalena Keverich (paternal grandmother)

Karl van Beethoven (4 September 1806 – 13 April 1858) was the only child born to Kaspar Anton Karl van Beethoven and Johanna van Beethoven (née Reiß: Reiss) and the sole nephew of composer Ludwig van Beethoven. He is mainly remembered for being the center of a bitter custody battle between his mother and famous uncle after his father's death.

== Early years ==
Beethoven (hereinafter referred to as Karl) was the grandson of Johann van Beethoven, a Flemish-German musician, teacher, and singer. Johann married Maria Magdalena Keverich and had seven children, three of whom survived into adulthood: Ludwig, Kaspar Anton Karl, and Nikolaus Johann.

Karl's mother, Johanna Reiß, was six months pregnant with him when she married Kaspar Anton Karl van Beethoven on 25 May 1806. He was born three months later on 4 September 1806.

== Custody battle ==
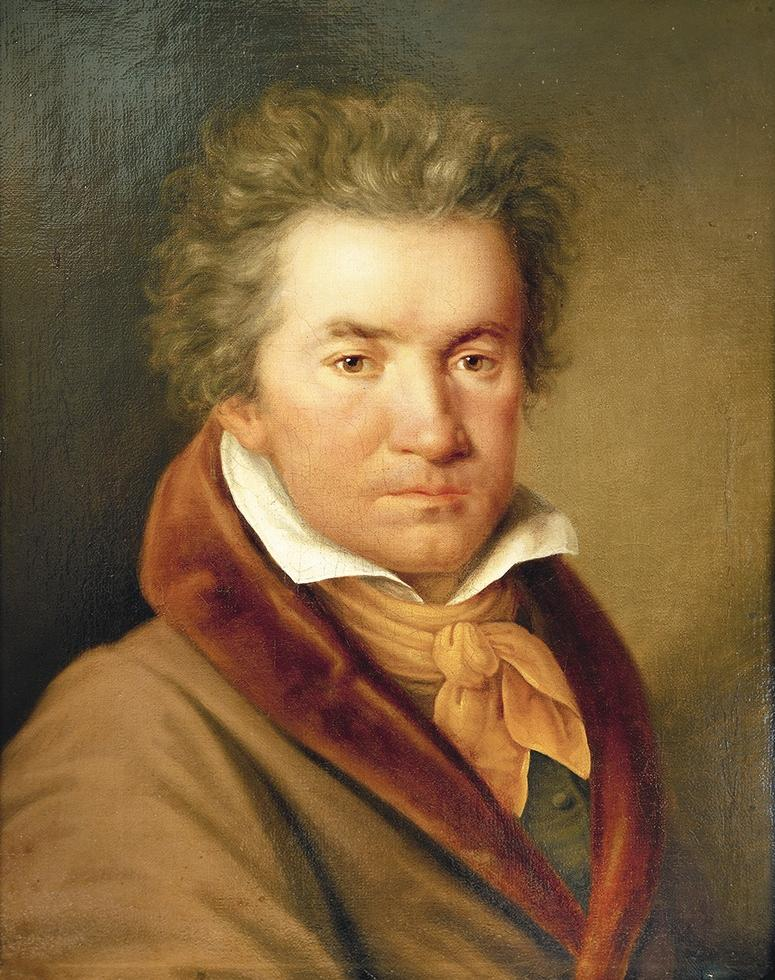
Ludwig van Beethoven in 1815, the year his brother Kaspar Anton Karl died

Following Kaspar's death in 1815, his brother Ludwig sought to take legal action against his wife, Johanna, for sole custody of her son, Karl. Ludwig found Johanna to be an unfit and immoral mother. In addition, Kaspar had left his brother custody of Karl in Article V of his last will and testament dated 14 November 1815: "I make my brother Ludwig van Beethoven the guardian of my son Karl ..." The original last will, drawn up two days before Kaspar died, read: "Along with my wife I appoint my brother Ludwig Van Beethoven co–guardian." Ludwig objected to the phrases, "Along with my wife" and "co–" and forced them to be deleted. Later, he would recall: "This I had my brother bring about since I did not wish to be bound up in this with such a bad woman in a matter of such importance as the education of the child."

After the amendment, however, Kaspar, drew up a codicil which stated: "God permit [my wife and brother] to be harmonious for the sake of my child's welfare." Four days following his death, Johanna and Ludwig were made co–guardians of Karl. Ludwig immediately filed a petition to the Imperial Royal Landrechete requesting sole guardianship. On 9 January 1816, the Landrechete awarded custody of Karl to his uncle. The ongoing custody battles between Karl's mother and his uncle took place between the years 1815 and 1820.

The numerous trials took an emotional toll on Karl. Not only was he compelled to give testimony shortly after his father's death in 1815; but he was denied from seeing his mother once his uncle took custody of him in 1816. When Karl disobeyed these orders, he was forcibly returned to his uncle by the police. Ludwig told his staff that Karl would benefit from little to no contact with his mother. During his teenage years, under his uncle's ward, Karl was enrolled in various schools. He was forced to take piano lessons from pianist and composer Carl Czerny. Ludwig was angered when Czerny told him that Karl had little musical ability or talent. Many of Ludwig's closest friends implored him to end the fight for his nephew, but he seemed obsessed with becoming the boy's father. Despite this obsession, it has been noted that Karl was considered to be lazy and dishonest. On the other hand, his disobedience and character development seems to coincide with certain events and direct influences within his life. For instance, Ludwig's constant barrage of insults toward Johanna as a "bad" and even "poisonous" presence in his life, seemed to have created the same "bad" identification in Karl. As well, his school reports declined dramatically as the Appellate Court hearing drew near.

On account of this behavior, Ludwig enrolled Karl in the Vienna boarding house Giannatasio del Rio from 1817 to 1818, and the Pensionat Blöchlinger in 1819. When Karl's mother attempted to visit him at his school, the director informed his uncle asking that she not interfere with his studies. Ludwig sought an injunction so that Johanna could not see Karl without his consent. Johanna became so incensed by this that she brought a series of court suits against Ludwig. The obsession, Ludwig claimed, was more in keeping with a promise to his brother's last will: ". . . since my greatly beloved brother has helped me so often with truly brotherly love in the most magnanimous and generous fashion that he will in the future transfer the love so often shown me as well as the friendship to my son Karl and that I expect with full confidence and in full reliance on his noble heart; I trust that he will do everything in his power for the mental education of my son and for his further career and I know that my brother will not refuse this my request.”

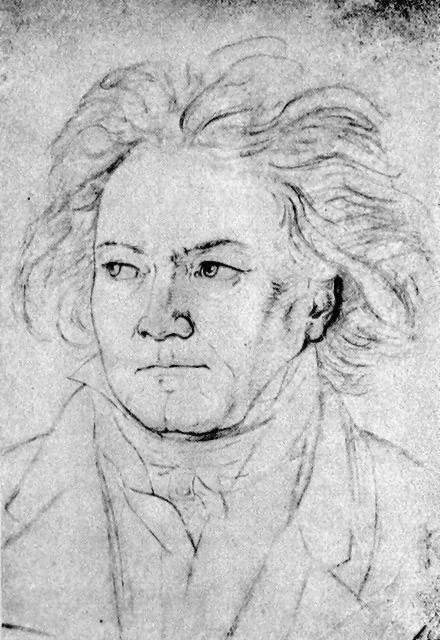
Ludwig van Beethoven in 1818

Johanna brought suit against Ludwig three times in September and October 1818; each time, her petitions were rejected. Coincidentally, it was reported in December 1818, that Karl had been abusive to one of his uncle's servants and had stolen money. Despite the teenager's unruly behavior, his uncle retained a faithful and affectionate care for him. In a letter dated 17 May 1825, he prefaced the letter to Karl with: "My son ..." and signed it with: "Your good and faithful father." This did not deter Karl's objection to the custody battle and its rules. During one of Karl's attempted escapes from his uncle, Johanna took Ludwig back to court in an attempt to show his lack of regard for her son's wellbeing. The Landrechete summoned Johanna, Ludwig, and Karl to a hearing on 11 December 1818. When asked who he wished to live with, Karl revealed that his uncle treated him well and if an interpreter could be provided, he would choose to reside with his uncle.

Due to an error on Ludwig's part, the case was moved to the Vienna Magistrat and a hearing was held on 11 January 1819. During this time, Karl stayed with his mother. While the Magistrat considered its ruling, Ludwig considered smuggling Karl out of the country; and even solicited the aid of Archduke Rudolf of Austria. In addition, he approached the magisterial councillor, Matthias von Tuscher to accept co-guardianship of Karl. The court recognized the co–guardianship; however, when von Tuscher recommended that Karl be sent away, Ludwig broke off the friendship and regained sole guardianship. On account of this, the Magistrat ruled against Ludwig, stating that Karl had been "subject to the whims of [his uncle] and have been tossed back and forth like a ball from one educational institution to another." It decreed on 17 September 1819 that Johanna be awarded custody of Karl with a co–guardian.

Ludwig retaliated by retaining one of Vienna's leading legal attorneys and appealed the decision. In an attempt to overturn the ruling, he approached a judge and two other members of the Appellate Court for "private talks". In a letter, Ludwig wrote, "Such a contingency would certainly provoke the disapproval of our civilized world." On 8 April 1820, the court found in his favor, and once again Karl was awarded to his uncle under the provision of a joint guardianship with his friend, Karl Peters. Despite Johanna's plea to the Emperor himself, the decree remained, and Karl was sent back to the Blöchlinger Institute, where he immediately ran away and had to be returned against his will. When the court battles were finally ended in 1820, Johanna lost all custody of her son.

Johann van Beethoven, Karl's other uncle, wrote to him years later on 10 June 1825 and tried to offer him counsel on the situation: "If you, however, think of all the things your uncle has already done for you, you must realize that he has spent probably in excess of 10,000 florins on your behalf, and what trouble and sorrows have you caused him! When one is young one does not see such things, but you will understand it much better as you get older..."

Karl's life with his famous uncle was greeted with complete misery, until he enrolled in the University of Vienna to study languages in 1825 at the age of 19. Despite his seeming lack of direction in life, he showed an adept talent for business relations. On account of this, his uncle assigned him the duties of handling his financial transactions. While at the university, his uncle moved to the country, but kept a close eye on his every move: At times, Ludwig would employ his friends to spy on Karl.

== Suicide attempt ==
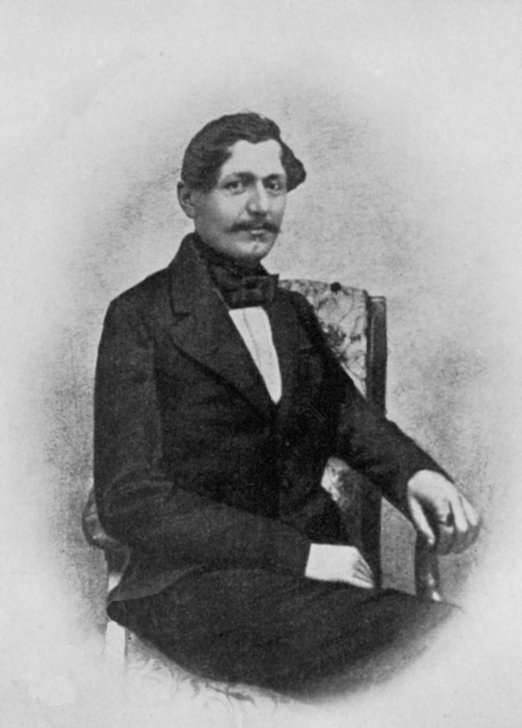
Karl van Beethoven in later life. His hair combed over his temple to hide the attempted suicide scar.

The revelation that Karl sought a career in the military sent his uncle into a severe fit of anger. Finding himself in utter distress, in July 1826, Karl bought a pistol with the intent of committing suicide. On 29 July, he pawned his watch and purchased a second pistol. Ascending to the castle Rauhenstein ruins in Baden bei Wien, armed with two pistols and gunpowder, Karl loaded both guns and pointed the first one toward his head. The fired shot missed him completely. Karl then took aim with the second pistol, fired, and this time the bullet grazed his temple. When Karl was discovered by a wagon driver the next day, he requested to be taken to his mother's house. The news of the attempted suicide and request to be brought to his sister-in-law's house deeply disturbed Karl's uncle, Ludwig. When the police questioned Karl, he replied: "my uncle has tormented me too much" and "I became worse because my uncle wanted me to be better."

Due to the suicide attempt, Karl was recommended for religious counseling and admitted to a hospital. Following his release in September, he was allowed by his uncle to travel to Bohemia for military service. A month before he left for duty, his uncle's health deteriorated. Karl stayed by his bedside throughout December 1826. The day after he left for duty, Ludwig drew up his last will and testament, leaving his entire estate to Karl.

Karl began to comb his hair forward over his temple to hide the attempted suicide scar. While Karl was serving in the military, Ludwig van Beethoven died on 26 March 1827; Karl returned three days later to attend the funeral.

== Later years ==
Karl retired from military service in 1832, and married Caroline Barbara Charlotte Naske. They had four daughters: Karoline Johanna (5 November 1831 – 30 August 1919), Marie Anna (31 August 1835 – 29 September 1891), Gabriele (24 March 1844 – 10 October 1914), Hermine (31 July 1852 – 7 April 1887) and one son, Ludwig Johann (baptised 31 March 1839 – died between 1890 and 1916). Although he attempted to make a living as a manager of agricultural lands, Karl and Caroline were able to live comfortably from willed inheritance from his uncles. Karl van Beethoven died from liver disease at the age of 51 on 13 April 1858. He was buried on 15 April 1858 in the Schmelz cemetery (today's März Park in Vienna's 15th District). His wife Caroline died of tracheitis at the age of 83 on 15 November 1891.

On 20 April 1903, Karl van Beethoven's grave was disinterred. According to Robert Homolka, the only attending witness was Karl's great-grandson Raoul Emil Weidinger. He stated: "... the grave was located roughly near the wall. I cannot remember anymore whether Karl van Beethoven had a tombstone. As the grave was opened, one could see that the deceased must have been a very tall man. The body was well preserved. I particularly noted the full snow-white hair. However, as soon as it came into contact with air, everything fell apart quickly." Karl's remains were transferred to the Dornbach cemetery on 20 April 1903, along with the remains of his wife and her granddaughter Eugenie Weidinger.

== Louis von Hoven ==
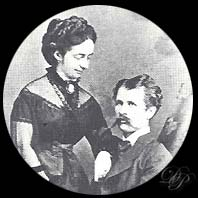
Louis von Hoven in America with his wife, Marie

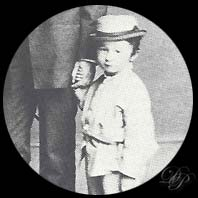
Karl Julius Maria van Beethoven

Karl van Beethoven and his wife Caroline had four daughters and a son, Ludwig (named after Karl's famous uncle), who was born on 8 March 1839 in Friehaus auf der Wieden "8. Stiege. 2. Stock, No.51."

Ludwig received a formidable education at the Piarist Gymnasium before serving in the military. Run-ins with the law began in 1862 when he stole money from his regiment. His mother, Caroline, relinquished the remaining savings of her inheritance to keep him from being arrested. Following his service, Ludwig became a journalist for the magazine Die Glocke. In 1868, Ludwig had to escape Vienna from both creditors and criminal court, by means of his mother's money a second time, and fled to Munich. There he became acquainted with Ludwig Nohl, who introduced him to composer Richard Wagner, who in turn requested his services to King Ludwig II of Bavaria. It was during this time that Ludwig began falsely claiming himself as the grandson of Ludwig van Beethoven. This direct line of musical nobility so impressed the King that he gave Ludwig a healthy salary on which to live. It was also at this time that Ludwig married his wife Marie (née Nitsche), a gifted pianist in her own right. He also began passing himself off as a Baron, and cheating people out of their wages. By 30 August 1871, facing four years in jail for his various offenses, Ludwig and Marie (who also faced six months), along with their son Karl Julius Maria (born 8 May 1870 in Munich) fled to Hamburg where they set sail for America. While in America, Ludwig changed his name to Louis von Hoven, to separate himself from his famous surname and (as he disclosed to his sister): "[save me from] being continuously faced with annoying questions." Louis and his wife Marie had six children: two of which are unknown, Marie (1865–1865), Meta (1874–sometime before 1890), and Heinrich (1871–1872). Their oldest son, Karl Julius, survived into adulthood.

During his stay in America, Louis worked for the Michigan Central Railroad in Detroit, began various businesses and found brief success as an inventor. Marie van Beethoven found success as a piano teacher and concert pianist, touring the United States and Montreal. By 1875, Louis became general manager of the New York Commissionaire Company. The music critic for The New Yorker magazine, Alex Ross, states however that Louis "ran a scheme renting wheelchairs to elderly people at the 1876 Centennial Exposition in Philadelphia" Louis and his family left America and were reported to have stayed in Vienna briefly in 1878.

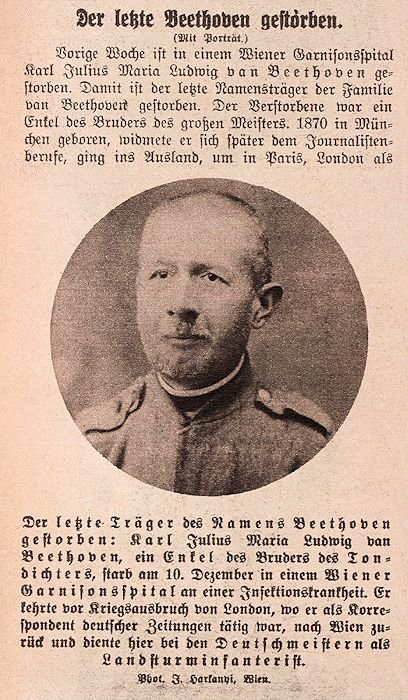
Photograph published in Das interessante Blatt 20 December 1917 of Karl Julius Maria van Beethoven

Historical documentation of Louis's whereabouts diminish considerably after the late 1870s. One of the last recorded evidences of him is found in author Paul Nettl's article "Beethoven's Grand-Nephew in America" where he is said to have been seen in Paris in 1890, sick and impoverished. It was thought that the place and date of his death were unknown; however, a discovered note drawn up by the Hietzing Court in Maria van Beethoven's probate file reveals that Louis von Hoven (aka Ludwig Johann van Beethoven) died in Brussels on 15 October 1913.

In 1907, the von Hoven family moved to Brussels. Karl Julius was old enough to work and took employment at numerous Belgian, French and English journals. On 26 September 1916, he enlisted in the Austrian Army for a short time. Marie van Beethoven, living alone and unable to care for herself, was moved to a nursing home where she died on 19 May 1917. Karl Julius did not attend his mother's funeral due to complications resulting from anemia, neurasthenia and malnutrition. He had been admitted to Garrison Hospital in April; and it took until August for the authorities to notify him of his mother's death. By June, his health had improved and he was re–assigned "unarmed office duty". On 1 September 1917, Karl Julius was awarded his mother's final belongings: a ring, an alarm clock, and 27 Kronen and 31 Heller cash.

On 3 December 1917, Karl Julius underwent surgery for an intestinal blockage. A few days later, on 9 December, he died of peritonitis. Although all his next of kin were listed as "deceased", the probate file stated that his aunt, Karoline Weidinger (widowed), was supposedly still living. Karl Julius was buried on 13 December 1917 next to his mother. His death as being the "last Beethoven" attracted media attention: "Yesterday the last bearer of the name Beethoven died in the Garrison Hospital. Karl Julius van Beethoven, a grandson of the great master's brother, was born in 1870 in Munich ..." (Nueus Wiener Journal, 11 December 1917); "The relatives who attended the funeral were ... Dr. Raoul E. Wedinger, his mother Hermine Weidinger, and their daughter Elsa. They were related to Mr. van Beethoven only in female lineage." (Fremden-Blatt, 17 December 1917); and the Das interessante Blatt published a photograph of Karl, dated 20 December 1917.

== In popular culture ==
Hans Teuscher portrayed Karl van Beethoven in the 1976 German film Beethoven 1 Tage aus einem Leben (Beethoven – Days in a Life).

In 1985, actor Dietmar Prinz played Karl van Beethoven in Paul Morrissey's film Beethoven's Nephew. A homoerotic atmosphere is heavily present within the storyline, although no such theory has ever been suggested by historians.

In the film Immortal Beloved, starring Gary Oldman as Ludwig van Beethoven, actor Marco Hofschneider portrays his nephew. The premise of the film's title concentrates on a ten-page letter that Ludwig van Beethoven wrote to an anonymous recipient: an "Immortal Beloved". Although most facts within the film are historically correct, the final presentation of the letter to Ludwig's sister-in-law, Johanna (Karl's mother), suggests that she is his true love, which scholars have never presented as a plausible theory.

The 2005 BBC TV miniseries The Genius of Beethoven devoted an entire episode, "Faith and Fury", to Ludwig van Beethoven and his nephew Karl.

In the 2006 film Copying Beethoven, the part of Karl van Beethoven is played by actor Joe Anderson.

The 2014 novel Conversations with Beethoven by Stanford Friedman follows the last year of Ludwig van Beethoven's life and explores the relationship and history between the composer and his nephew.

== Bibliography ==
- Magnani, Luigi (1977). Beethoven's Nephew. W. H. Allen. ISBN 978-0491016889.
- Sterba, Editha (1954). Beethoven and his nephew: A psychoanalytic study of their relationship. Schocken Books. ISBN 978-0-8052028-9-2.
- Torfs, Ana (1977). Beethoven's Nephew. Gevaert. ISBN 978-2930128115.
