= Beethoven's Nephew =

1985 film by Paul Morrissey

Beethoven's Nephew (Original French title: Le neveu de Beethoven) is a 1985 French-German film directed by Paul Morrissey.

== Synopsis ==
Ludwig van Beethoven, a man with a difficult character, becomes the guardian of his nephew Karl. He helps him, watches him, and intervenes in his first romantic experience.

== Cast ==
- Wolfgang Reichmann as Ludwig van Beethoven
- Dietmar Prinz as Karl
- Jane Birkin as Johanna
- Nathalie Baye as Leonore
- Mathieu Carrière as Archduke Rudolf
- Ulrich Berr as Schindler
