= Maria Magdalena van Beethoven =

Mother of Ludwig van Beethoven (1746–1787)

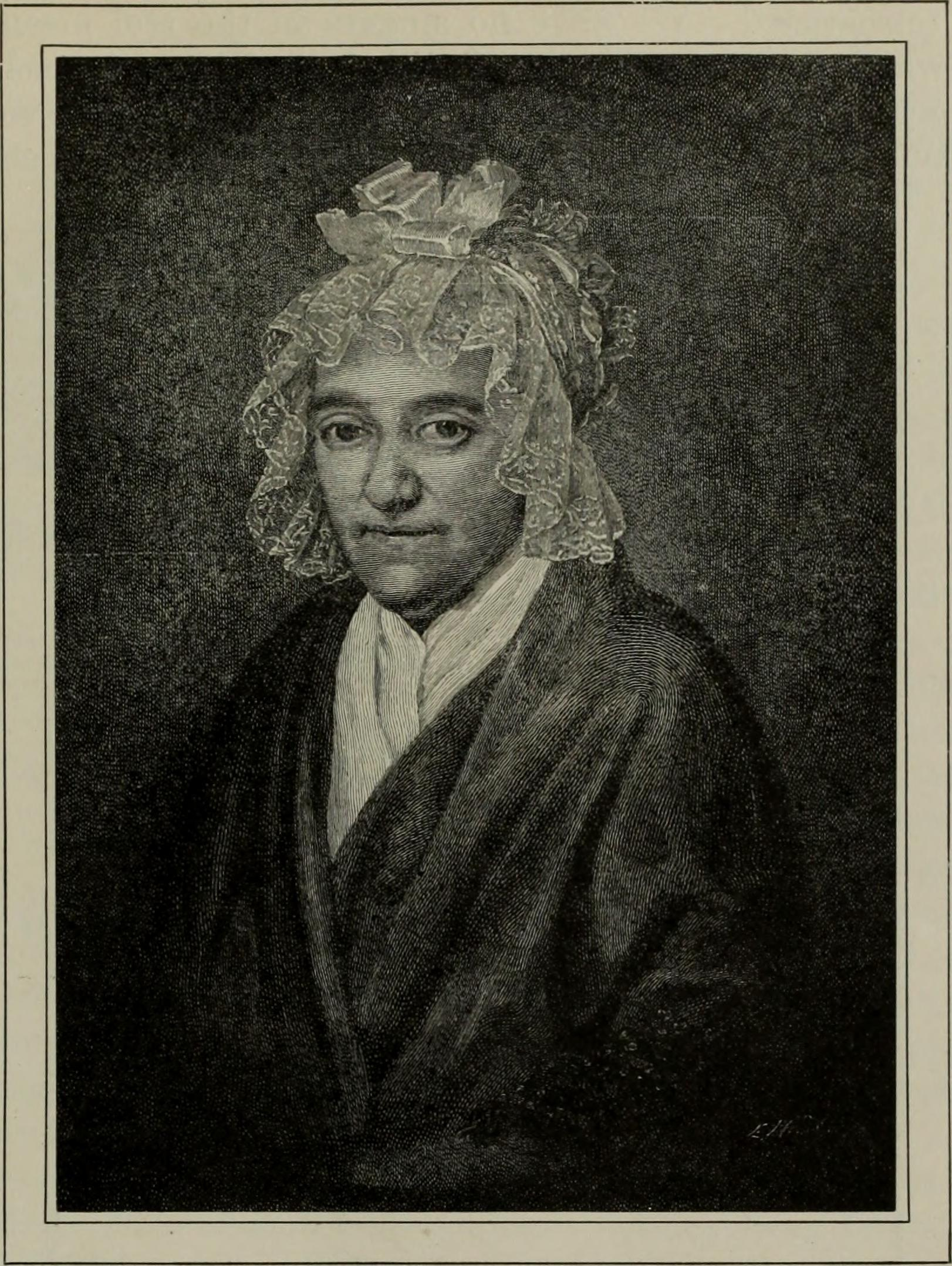
- Painting by Benedikt Beckenkamp. The portrait's authenticity is disputed: Alexander Wheelock Thayer writes that it rests on "uncertain tradition" and "lacks authoritative attestation".
- Born: Maria Magdalena Keverich; 19 December 1746; Ehrenbreitstein
- Died: 17 July 1787 (aged 40); Bonn
- Other name: Maria Magdalena Leym
- Spouse: Johann van Beethoven
- Children: 7, including Ludwig van Beethoven; Kaspar Anton Karl van Beethoven; Nikolaus Johann van Beethoven

Maria Magdalena van Beethoven, née Keverich (19 December 1746 – 17 July 1787) was the wife of the Bonn court musician Johann van Beethoven and the mother of the composer Ludwig van Beethoven.

== Life ==
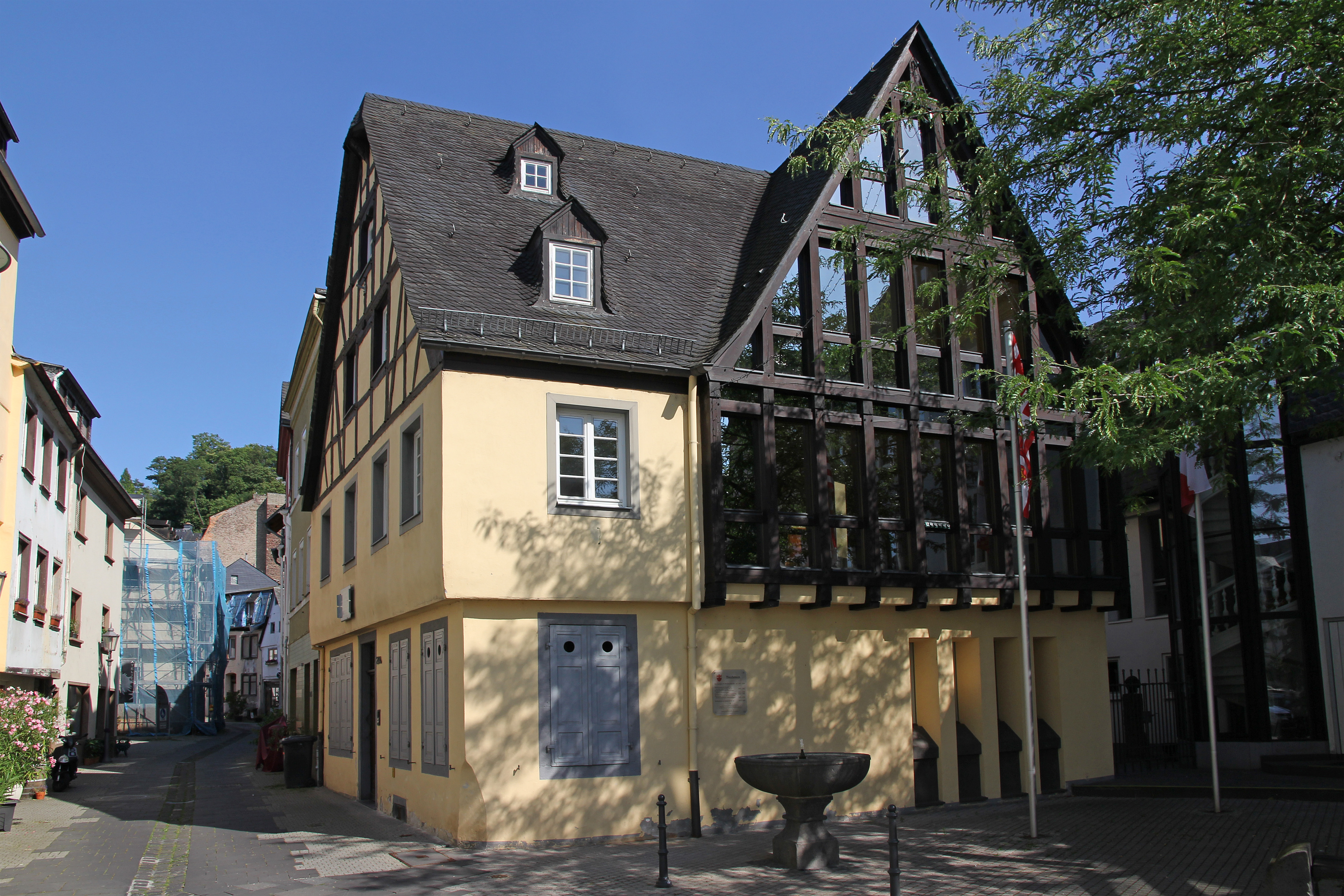
Birthplace of Maria Magdalena van Beethoven, née Keverich, in Ehrenbreitstein, now a museum

Maria Magdalena Keverich was born in Ehrenbreitstein, a village on the Rhine opposite Koblenz (and now part of Koblenz). Her birthplace is now a museum, named Mutter-Beethoven-Haus. Her parents were Johann Heinrich Keverich and Anna Klara (Clara) née Westorff, who married in 1731. From 1733, Johann was head cook at the court of Franz Georg von Schönborn, the Elector of Trier, at Schloss Philippsburg in Ehrenbreitstein. Maria Magdalena was the youngest of their six children. Of the six births to Johann and Anna Klara, she and her brother Johann Peter Keverich were the only ones to survive into adulthood. Johann Peter became a priest (taking the name Father Hubertus), and later prior, of the Carmelite Monastery in Koblenz. Their father died when Maria Magdalena was 12.

=== Marriage to Johann Georg Leym ===
On 30 January 1763, she married Johann Georg Leym, 13 years her senior, who was in the service of the Archbishop of Trier. In 1764 they had a son, Johann Peter Anton Leym, who died in infancy ('within a few days', by one source, 'after a month', by another). Johann Georg Leym died in 1765.

As a teenage widow, she returned to living with her widowed mother.

=== Marriage to Johann van Beethoven ===
She married Johann van Beethoven at the Church of St Remigius, Bonn on 12 November 1767. Johann's father was Kapellmeister at the court of the Electorate of Cologne, which was in Bonn, and Johann was a court musician there. Johann and Maria van Beethoven had seven children, three of whom lived into adulthood:

- Ludwig Maria van Beethoven (2 April 1769 – 6 April 1769)
- Ludwig van Beethoven (16 December 1770 in Bonn, Kurköln – 26 March 1827)
- Kaspar Anton Karl van Beethoven (8 April 1774 – 15 November 1815)
- Nikolaus Johann van Beethoven (2 October 1776 – 12 January 1848)
- Anna Maria Franziska van Beethoven (23 February 1779 – 27 February 1779)
- Franz Georg van Beethoven (17 January 1781 – 16 August 1783)
- Maria Margarete Josepha van Beethoven (5 May 1786 – 26 November 1787)

=== Death ===
Maria died in Bonn on 17 July 1787 of tuberculosis, aged 40. She was buried in the Alter Friedhof ('Old Cemetery'), Bonn.
