= Burgruine Rauhenstein =

Castle ruins in Baden, Lower Austria

Coordinates: 48°00′47″N 16°12′20″E

- Lower Austria, Austria
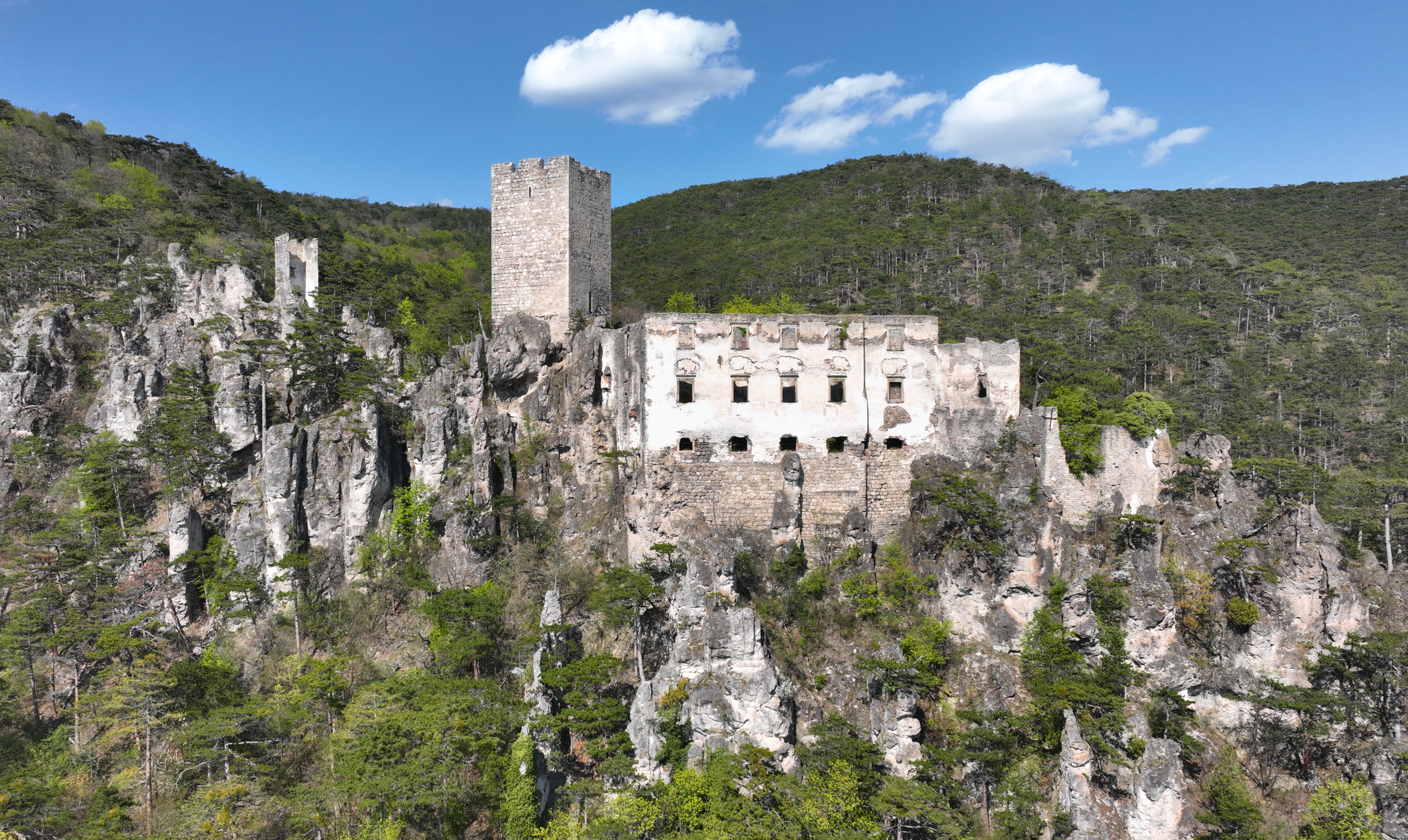
- Ruins of Burgruine Rauhenstein viewed from the south-west in 2022

Site information
- Type: Castle

Site history
- Built: 12th century

Burgruine Rauhenstein is a ruinous medieval castle in Baden bei Wien, Lower Austria, Austria, built in the 12th century. Its tower stands 20 metres high. It is the location where Karl van Beethoven, Ludwig van Beethoven's nephew, attempted suicide in July 1826.

== See also ==
- List of castles in Austria
