= Birthplace of Beethoven's mother =

Cultural heritage monument in Rhineland-Palatinate, Germany

- Mutter-Beethoven-Haus
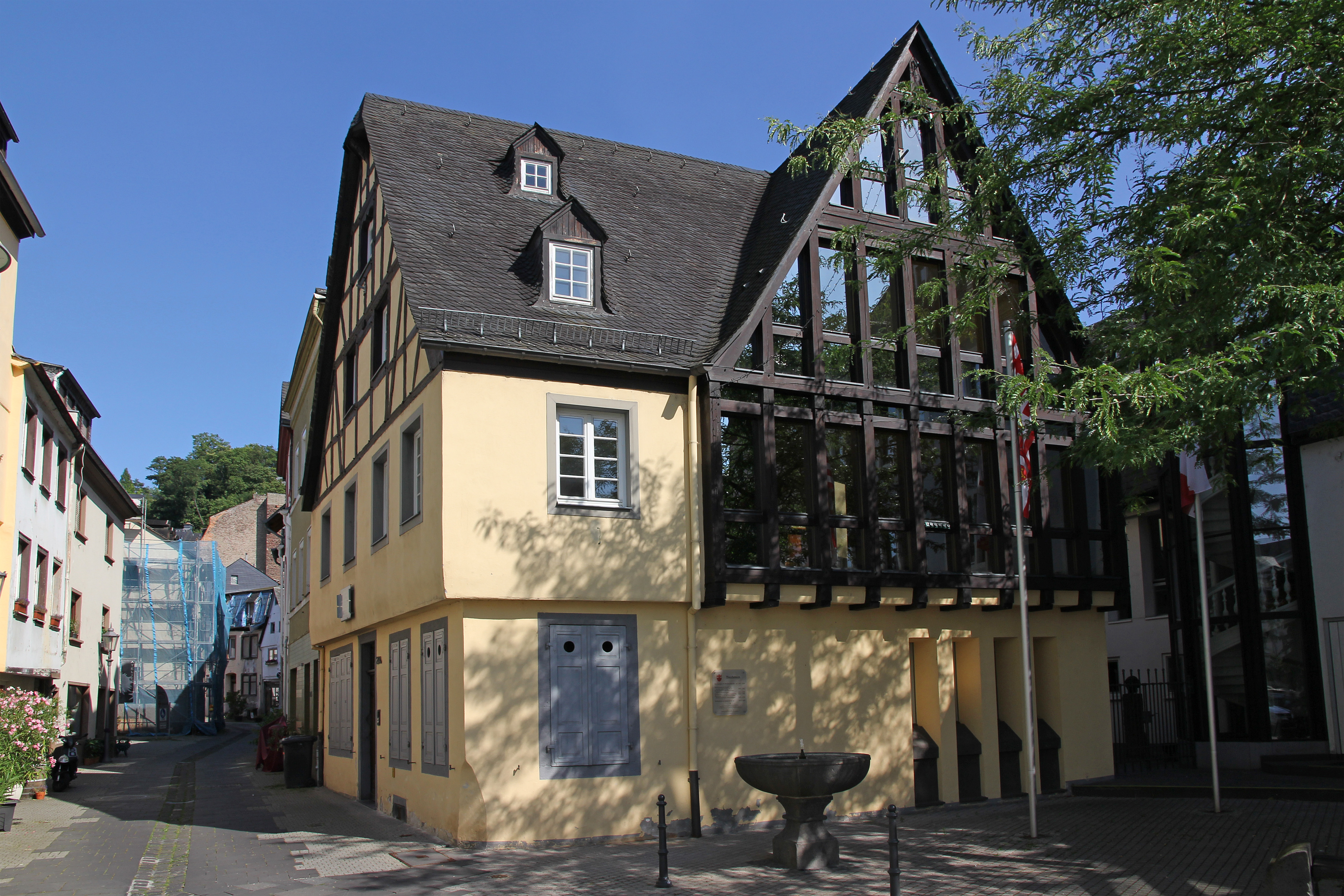
- Interactive map of the Birthplace of Beethoven's mother area

General information
- Location: Wambachstrasse 204; 56077 Koblenz-Ehrenbreitstein, Germany
- Coordinates: 50°21′35.37″N 7°36′39.24″E

Website
- www.mutter-beethoven-haus.de

The Birthplace of Beethoven's mother (German: Mutter-Beethoven-Haus) is a cultural heritage monument in Ehrenbreitstein, on the River Rhine opposite Koblenz, in Rhineland-Palatinate, Germany. Maria Magdalena van Beethoven, mother of the composer Ludwig van Beethoven, was born here in 1746; it is now a museum.

== Description ==
=== Family history ===
Maria Magdalena's parents, Johann Heinrich Keverich (1702–1759) and Anna Klara Westorff (1707–1768), were married in 1731. From 1733, Johann was head cook at the court of Franz Georg von Schönborn, the Elector of Trier, at Schloss Philippsburg in Ehrenbreitstein. Maria Magdalena, the youngest of several children, was born on 19 December 1746.

=== The building ===
The building, with a ground floor of stone and a half-timbered upper floor, dates from the 17th century. The façade was plastered in the following century. It was bought in 1960 by the city of Koblenz, and it was opened in 1975 as a memorial to Beethoven. After fire severely damaged the building, it was renovated in 1987–89, and a concert hall for chamber music was created from an adjoining building.

=== Present day ===
The museum is owned by the Mittelrhein-Museum in Koblenz. There is a permanent exhibition: themes include the history of Ehrenbreitstein, music at the Electoral Court and the Keverich family as servants at the court, musical culture in the Biedermeier period, and notable past residents of Ehrenbreitstein: Sophie von La Roche, Clemens Brentano and Henriette Sonntag. Special exhibitions are shown.

Concerts regularly take place in the chamber music hall.
