= Otto Heinrich von Loeben =

German writer

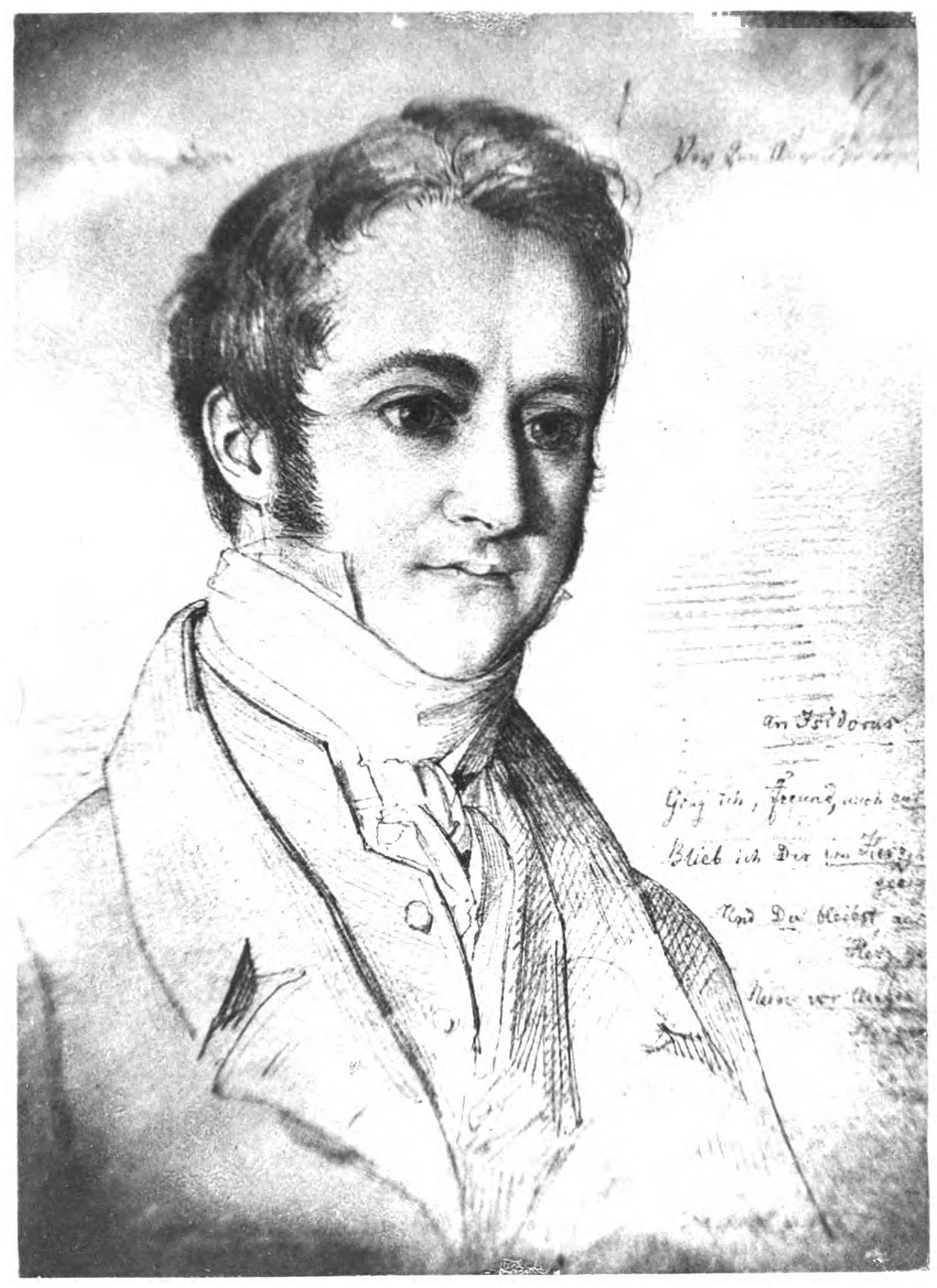
Otto Heinrich von Loeben

Ferdinand August Otto Heinrich, Graf von Loeben (18 August 1786 in Dresden – 3 April 1825 in Dresden) was a German writer.

== Biography ==
He was born into an aristocratic Protestant family, and was educated by private tutors. From 1804 he studied law at the University of Wittenberg, but moved to Heidelberg in 1807, where he befriended Joseph von Eichendorff, also meeting Achim von Arnim, Clemens Brentano and Johann Joseph von Görres. Over the next few years he travelled between Vienna, Dresden and Berlin, meeting Friedrich de la Motte Fouqué at Nennhausen. He was involved in the campaign of 1813–14; after his return, he married Johanna Victoria Gottliebe née von Bressler and spent the rest of his life in Dresden. A stroke suffered in 1822 left him an invalid until his death.

Graf von Loeben was a very prolific writer of the Dresden school, and he influenced Eichendorff and Ludwig Tieck among others, but quickly fell out of favour, most later critics viewing his work as bordering on parody. His most important novel is Guido, written under the pen-name "Isidorus Orientalis". Under a second pseudonym, Heinrich Goeble (sometimes just H. Goeble), he authored the poem Abendlied unterm gestirten Himmel, set to music by Ludwig van Beethoven as WoO 150.

An article about him can be found in the Allgemeine deutsche Biographie, and a monograph by Raimund Pissin was published in Berlin in 1905. On the basis of these two sources, Porterfield enumerates his known works as "one conventional drama, one musical-romantic drama, two narrative poems, one of which is on Ferdusi, three collections of poems, between 30 and 40 novelettes, fairy tales and [several thousand] aphorisms and detached thoughts." He is discussed by his friend Eichendorff in Ahnung und Gegenwart (ch. 12) and Erlebtes (ch. 10).

== Selected works ==
- Guido, novel
- Das weisse Ross, eine altdeutsche Familienchronik in 36 Bildern, a novelette (1817)
- Die Sonnenkinder, short story
- Die Perle und die Maiblume, novelette
- Cephalus und Procris, play
- Ferdusi
- Persiens Ritter, short story
- Die Zaubernächte am Bosporus
- Prinz Floridio, fairy-tale
- Leda, short story
- Weinmärchen, fairy-tales
- Gesänge
- Abendlied unterm gestirnten Himmel (set to music by Beethoven)
