= Girolamo Donnini (composer) =

Girolamo Donnini (fl. 1719 - died 1752) was an Italian composer and conductor active in Bonn, Electorate of Cologne, Holy Roman Empire, during the first half of the 18th century.

== Life and career ==
Nothing is known about Girolamo Donnini's early life other than he was born in an unknown year somewhere in Italy. The first certain record of the composer dates to the year 1719, when he was in service as a Konzertmeister to Joseph Clemens of Bavaria in the city of Bonn, Electorate of Cologne; although it is possible he may have been in that role as early as 1714. He was one of three Konzertmeisters working for Clemens, and his responsibilities mainly involved conducting operas. He also worked as a court composer, with his first known work being the three-act opera Ester, which was written and performed for the royal visit of the sons of Maximilian II Emanuel, Elector of Bavaria: Princes Albert Charles (later Holy Roman Emperor) and Ferdinand.

In 1723, Clemens appointed Donnini to the post of chamber music composer. Clemens died later that year and was succeeded as elector by Clemens August of Bavaria. Clemens August appointed Donnini to the post of Kapellmeister in Bonn on 29 March 1732, after the death of Kappelmeister Gioseffo Trevisani. He remained in that role until his death in early 1752. Ludwig van Beethoven the Elder, the grandfather of Ludwig van Beethoven, was one of the singers under Donnini while he was Kappelmeister.
