= Theodore Albrecht =

American music historian (born 1945)

Theodore Albrecht (September 24, 1945 – June 11, 2025) was a music historian who specialized in the life and music of Ludwig van Beethoven.

== Biography ==
Albrecht was born in Jamestown, New York, and grew up in San Antonio, Texas. He was a 1967 graduate of St. Mary's University in San Antonio (B.M.E., music education) and of North Texas State University (now University of North Texas) in Denton, Texas in 1969 (M.M., musicology and music literature) and 1975 (Ph.D., musicology and history).

After teaching at various colleges across the United States, Albrecht joined the faculty of Kent State University in 1992.

Albrecht's scholarly papers were published in music journals including Journal of the Conductor's Guild and The Beethoven Journal. He was responsible for work that advanced historical musicology in various ways, notably in translating and editing the complete conversation notebooks used by the deaf Ludwig van Beethoven to communicate in the later stages of his life. Albrecht uncovered evidence that the degree of Beethoven's hearing loss was not as absolute as previously believed. He was also responsible for the identification, to the satisfaction of most scholars, of the pseudonymous author of the text of Beethoven's song "Abendlied unterm gestirnten Himmel," a longstanding mystery.

Albrecht gave lectures before performances of various music ensembles, notably the Cleveland Orchestra and Opera Cleveland.

== Bibliography ==
- Albrecht, Theodore; American Beethoven Society; Ira F. Brilliant Center for Beethoven Studies (1996). Letters to Beethoven and other correspondence. Lincoln, Nebraska, US: University of Nebraska Press. Volume 1: ISBN 978-0-80321-033-2; Volume 2: ISBN 978-0-80321-039-4; Volume 3: ISBN 978-0-80321-040-0
- van Beethoven, Ludwig. Theodore Albrecht (ed.). Beethoven's Conversation Books [English translation]. Martlesham, Suffolk, UK: Boydell & Brewer. Volume 1: ISBN 978-1-78327-150-4 (2018); Volume 2: ISBN 978-1-78327-151-1 (2019); Volume 3: ISBN 978-1-78327-152-8 (2020); Volume 4: ISBN 978-1-78327-621-9 (2022)
- Albrecht, Theodore (2024). Beethoven's Ninth Symphony: Rehearsing and Performing Its 1824 Premiere. Martlesham, Suffolk, UK: Boydell & Brewer. doi:10.2307/jj.5806809. ISBN 978-1-83765-105-4. JSTOR jj.5806809.
