= St. Maria Lyskirchen, Cologne =

Romanesque church in Cologne, Germany

Coordinates: 50°55′59″N 6°57′45″E

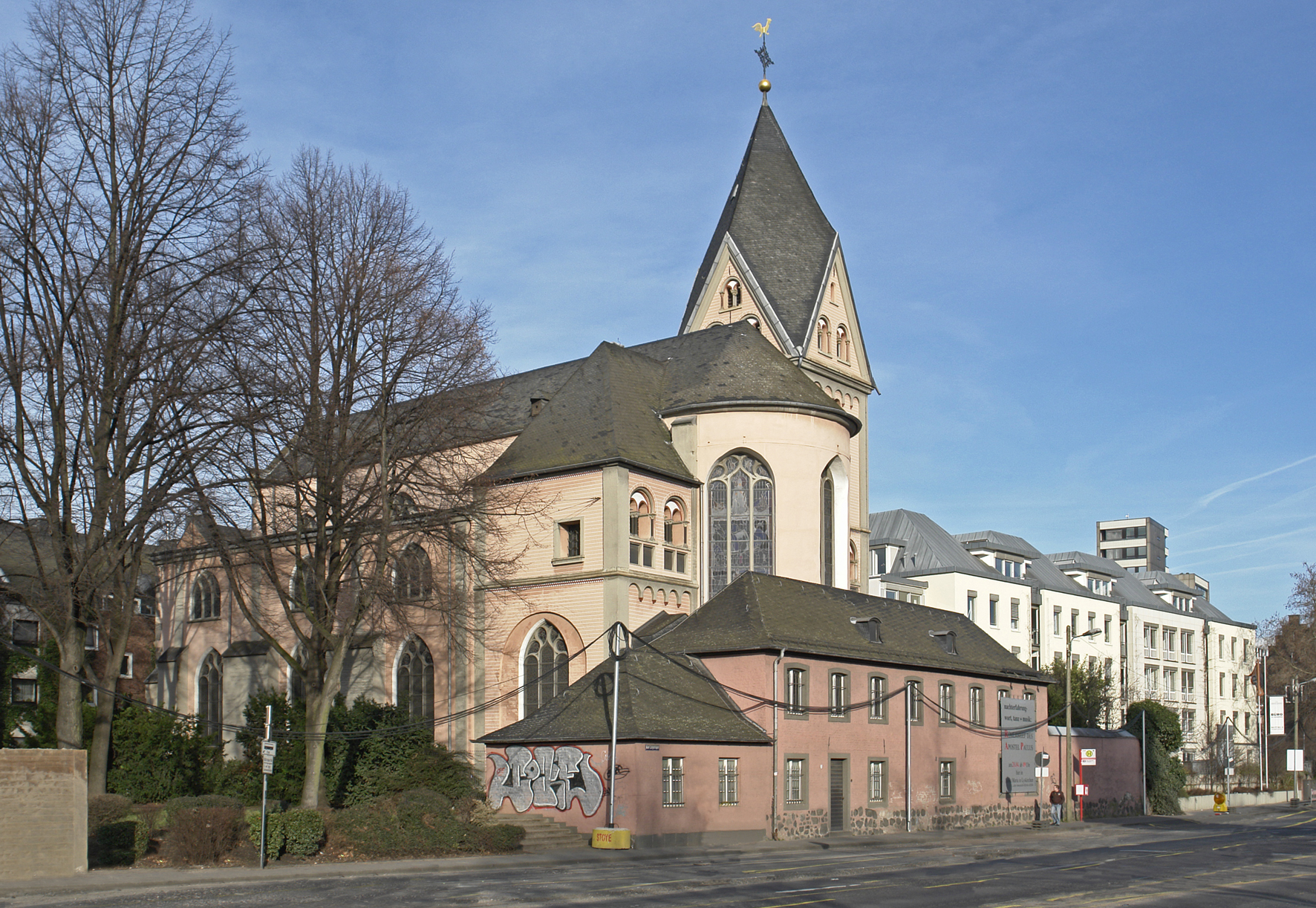
St. Maria Lyskirchen

St. Maria Lyskirchen is one of twelve Romanesque churches in Cologne, Germany.

== History ==
St. Maria Lyskirchen is the smallest of the twelve Romanesque churches in Cologne. It was founded in 948, and the present building dates from 1210 to 1220, with some later additions in the Gothic style. The upper parts of the west front were rebuilt in the 19th century. The church is in the form of a three-aisled basilica, with a chancel flanked by two towers, only one of which was constructed to its full height, and an eastern apse. The building received only minor damage during the wars.

The church has a sculptured Romanesque portal, and a cycle of 13th century ceiling paintings. Rediscovered in the 19th century, they are unique in Cologne and show stories from the Old and New Testaments. The church contains the "Schiffermadonna" (Seaman's Madonna), a wooden statue of 1420. A triptych by Joos van Cleve, with a central panel of the Lamentation, was sold in 1812; a few years later it was replaced with a copy by Benedikt Beckenkamp, which remains in the church.

== Gallery ==
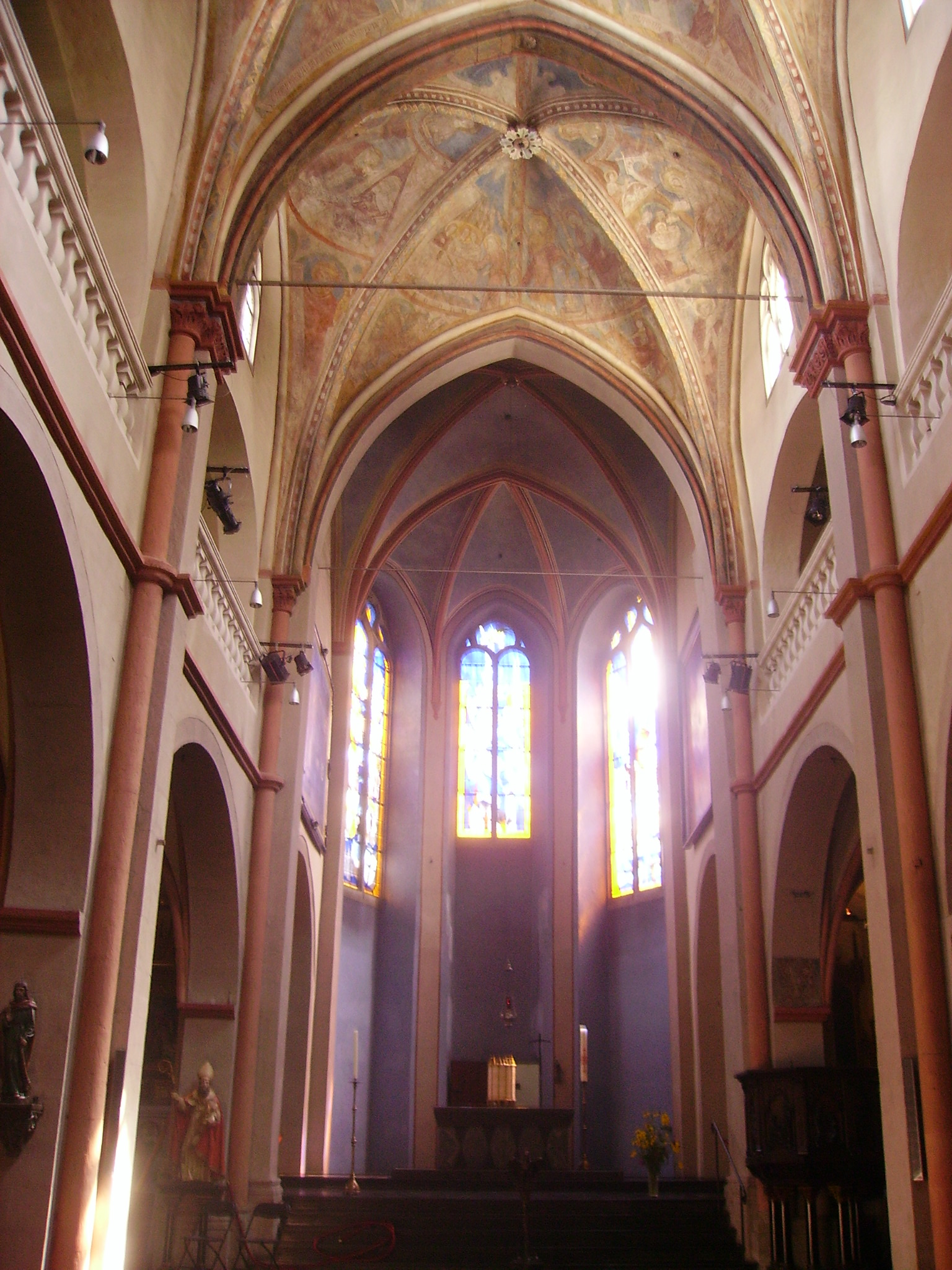
The interior

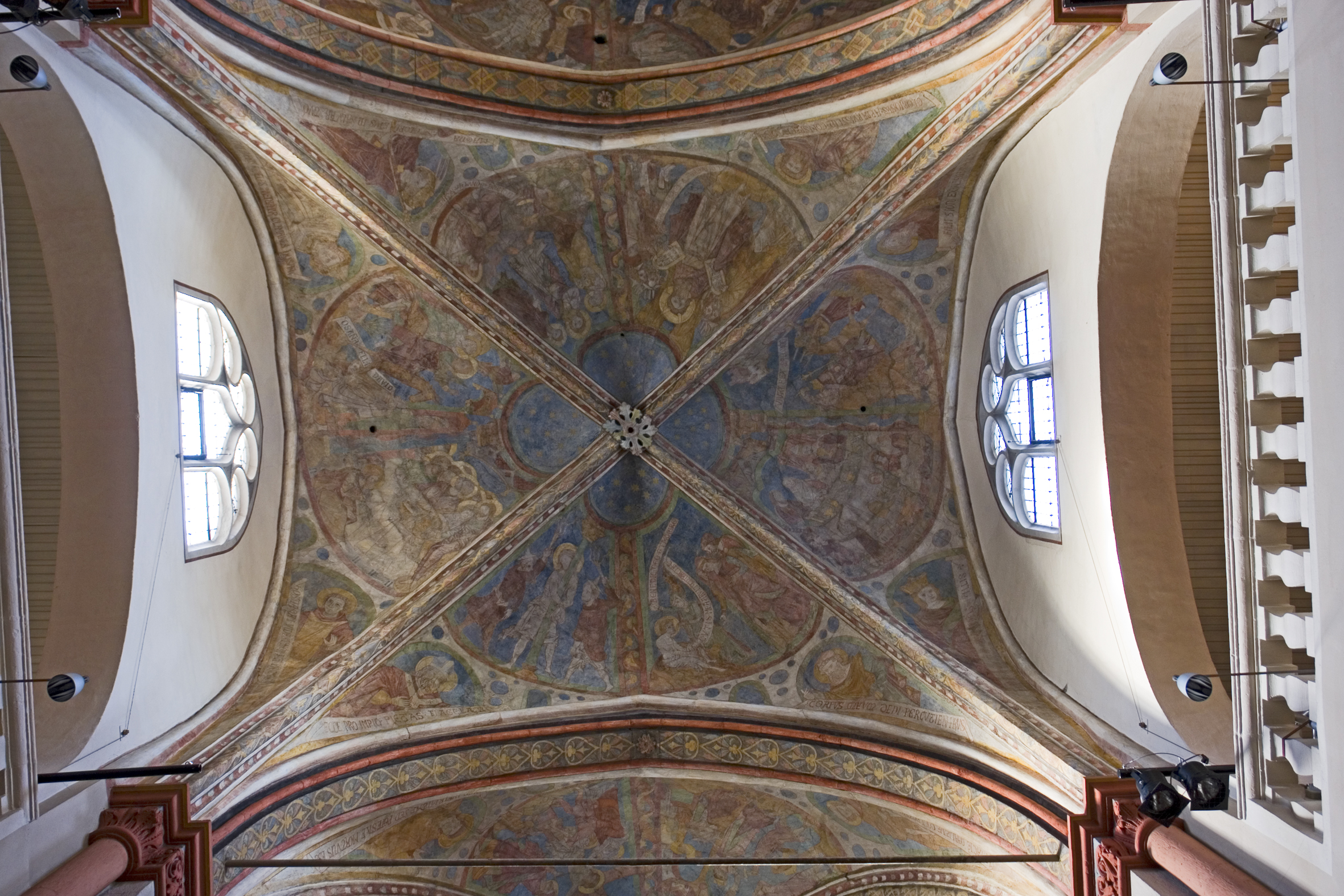
The painted ceiling

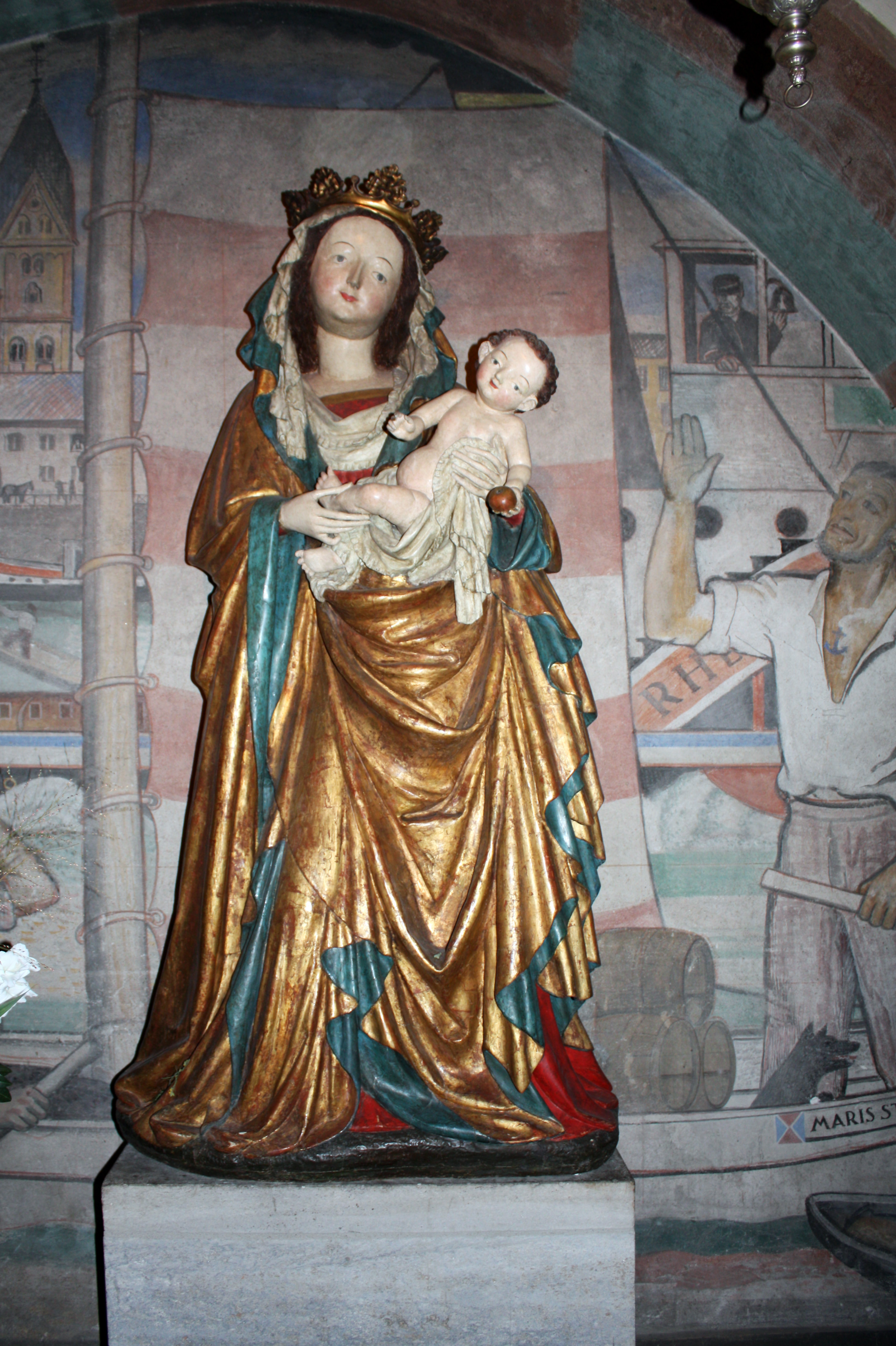
The Seaman's Madonna

== See also ==
- Twelve Romanesque churches of Cologne
- Cologne Cathedral
- German architecture
- Romanesque architecture
- List of regional characteristics of Romanesque churches
- Romanesque secular and domestic architecture
