= St. Remigius, Bonn =

St. Remigius
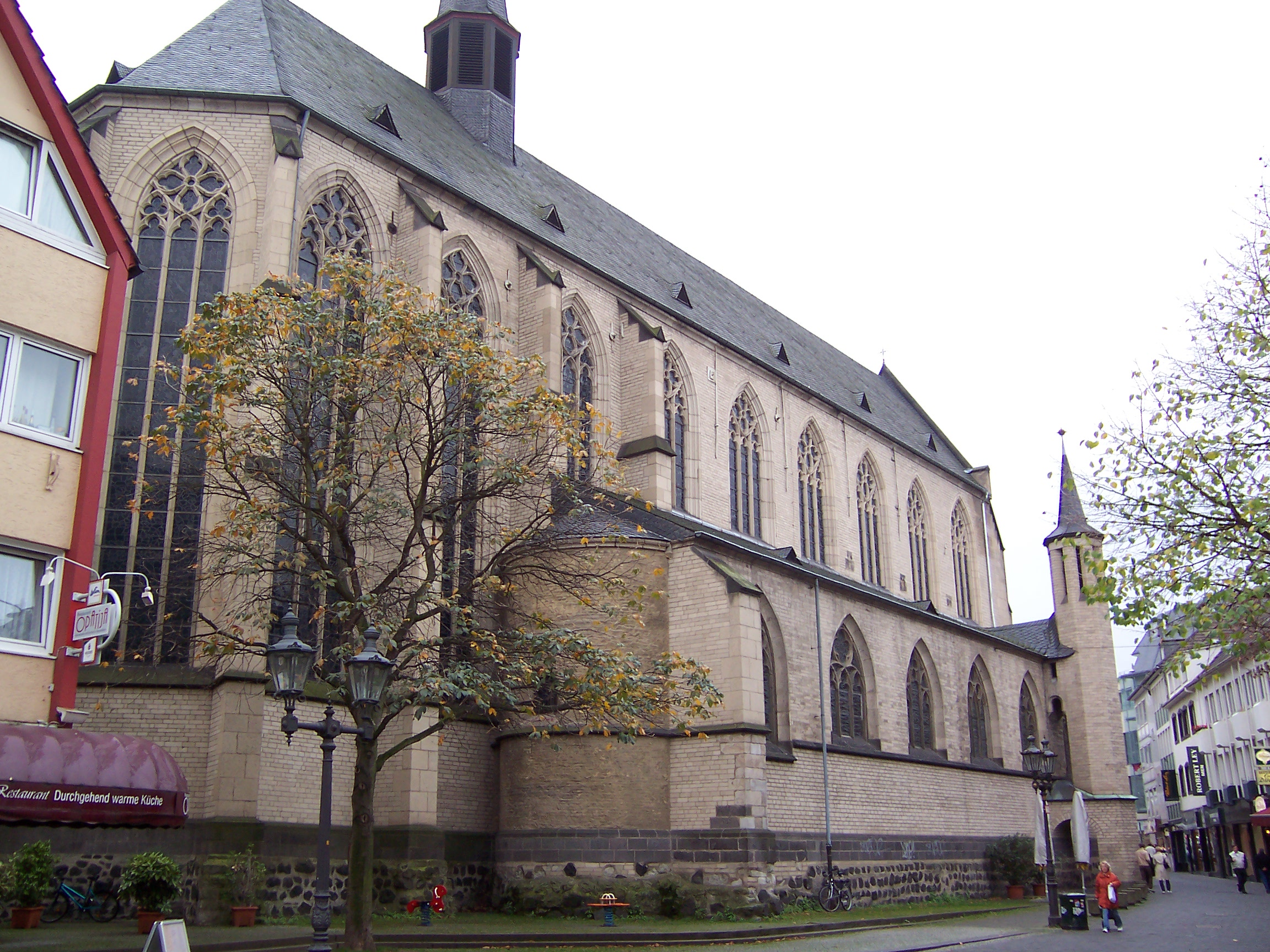
- St. Remigius
- 50°44′10″N 7°06′12″E
- Location: Brüdergasse 8; 53111 Bonn
- Country: Germany
- Denomination: Catholic

History
- Dedication: Saint Remigius
- Consecrated: 1307

Architecture
- Style: Gothic

St. Remigius is a Catholic church and parish in Bonn, Germany. The building was completed in 1307, in Gothic style.

== History ==
Construction of the church, originally intended as a monastery church, was begun in 1272 by the Franciscan Order. It was completed and consecrated in 1307, dedicated to Louis of Toulouse. In 1806 the church was taken over by the parish of St. Remigius, after the church in that parish was struck by lightning in 1800.

The building was damaged when Bonn came under siege by Brandenburg troops in 1689, and was damaged by a fire in 1888. It again suffered damage during the Second World War.

From 1957 to 2007 it was again a monastery church under the care of the Franciscans. In 2006 the independent parish of St. Remigius merged with the parish of St. Martin.

== Association with Beethoven ==
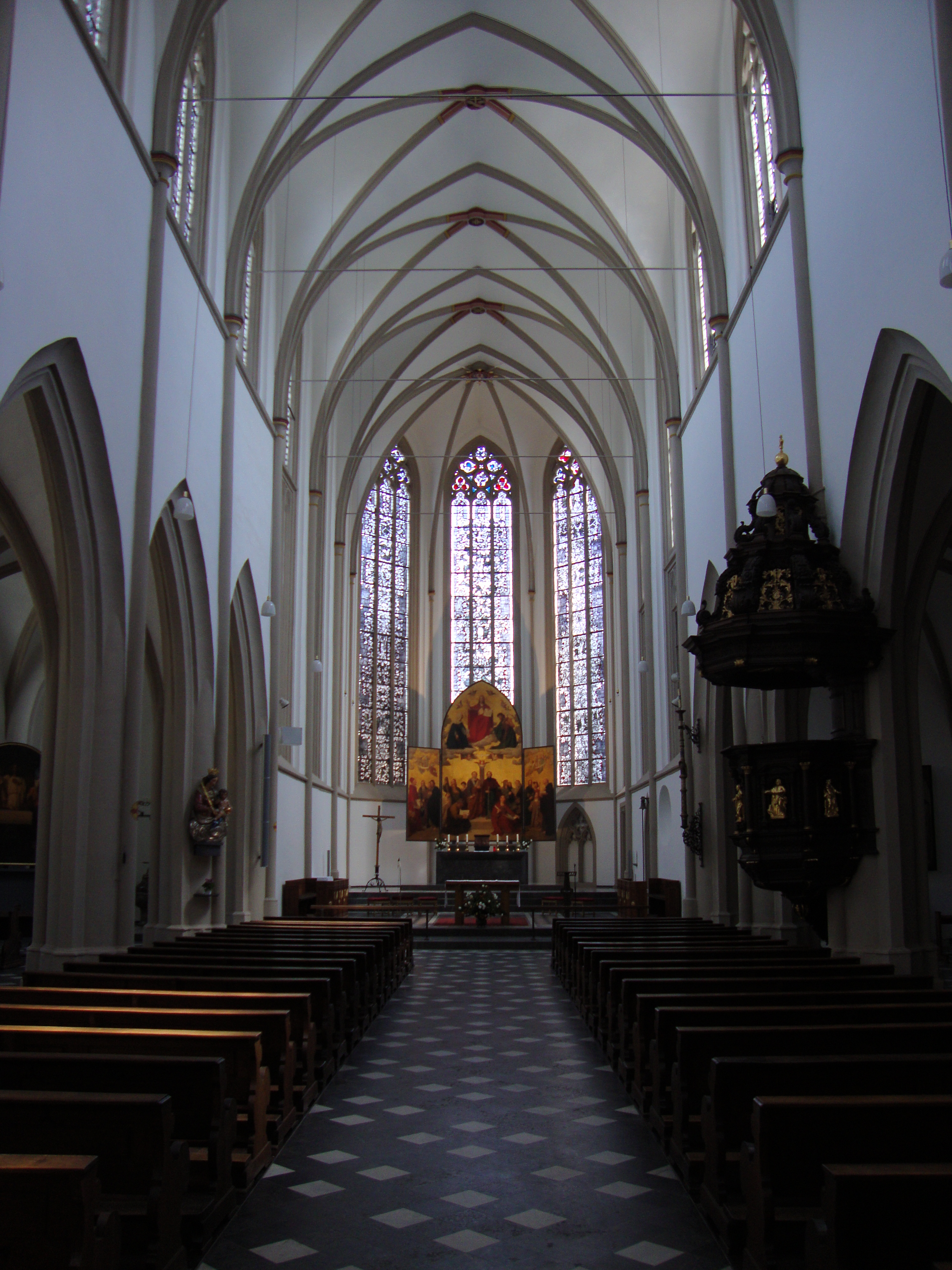
Interior, looking towards the altar

Johann van Beethoven and Maria Magdalena Keverich were married in the church on 12 November 1767. Their son Ludwig van Beethoven was baptized here on 17 December 1770.

At that time the Baroque organ of the church was the largest in Bonn, with 33 registers. Beethoven, aged 12, substituted the main organist, playing the morning mass in the church, and was engaged as assistant organist the following year.

During bombardment in 1944 the organ was destroyed. However the organ console had been replaced during an earlier renovation, and in 1905 the old console was given to the Beethoven House in Bonn.
