= Ludwig van Beethoven the Elder =

Grandfather of Ludwig van Beethoven (1712–1773)

Ludwig van Beethoven
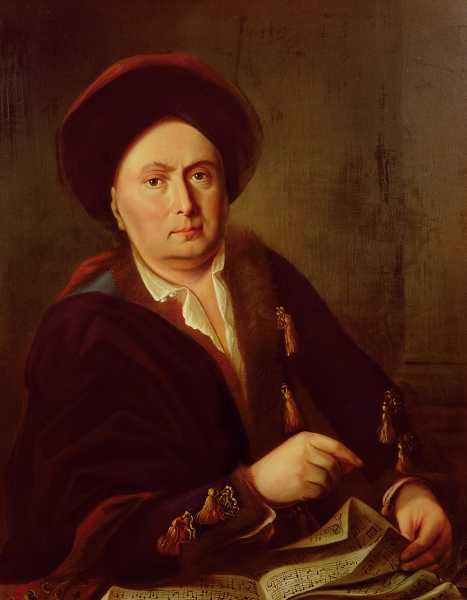
- Portrait by Amelius Radoux, 1773, now in the Beethoven House, Bonn
- Born: Lodewijk van Beethoven c. 5 January 1712; Mechelen, Spanish Netherlands
- Died: 24 December 1773 (aged 61); Bonn, Cologne
- Other name: Ludwig van Beethoven the Elder
- Occupations: Singer; music director
- Spouse: Maria Josepha Poll
- Children: 3, including Johann van Beethoven
- Relatives: Ludwig van Beethoven (grandson)

Ludwig van Beethoven the Elder (born Lodewijk van Beethoven; c. 5 January 1712 – 24 December 1773) was a Flemish professional singer and music director, best known as the grandfather of the composer Ludwig van Beethoven. In the baptismal register he was named Ludovicus van Beethoven. During his life, his first name was written variously as Lodewyk, Lodewyck, Lodewijck, Lodewijk, Louis, and Ludwig.

== Ancestry and birth ==
The family name means "from (van) a place called Beethoven", possibly Bettenhoven.

A number of authors, such as Alexander Wheelock Thayer and Donald W. MacArdle in his book The Family van Beethoven, point to the fact that in 1712 two boys named Ludwig van Beethoven were born. The two families were distantly related:

- Ludwig van Beethoven, born 5 January 1712, in Mechelen, son of Michael van Beethoven
- Ludwig van Beethoven, born 23 December 1712, in Antwerp, son of Henry Adelard van Beethoven

He further writes that it is not certain "which Ludwig" actually settled in Bonn in 1733. The first biographer of the composer Beethoven "made no attempt to trace his genealogy beyond his grandfather Ludwig".

The Ludwig van Beethoven from Mechelen, generally assumed to be Beethoven's grandfather, was the third son of master baker Michael van Beethoven (baptized 15 February 1684 in Mechelen, died 28 June 1749, in Bonn) and his wife Maria Louise Stuyckers (24 April 1685, Mechelen – 8 December 1749, Bonn). Michael van Beethoven, besides the bakery trade, participated also in the local real estate market and in the purchase and sale of antique furniture and paintings.

Michael van Beethoven had three other children:

- Kornelius van Beethoven (baptized 25 September 1708, Mechelen, died 16 July 1764, Bonn)
- Ludwig van Beethoven (baptized 23 June 1710 in Mechelen, died 22 September 1710, Mechelen)
- Lambert Michael van Beethoven (baptized 25 July 1715, Mechelen, died 21 September 1715, Mechelen)

== Life ==
On 10 December 1717, going on the age of just six years, Ludwig van Beethoven the Elder, having "a beautiful voice", was granted admission to the choir boys seminar of St. Rumbold's Cathedral in Mechelen, effectively becoming a choirboy.

On 12 October 1725, he began studies under Anton Colfs, chief organist and carillonneur of St. Rumbold's Cathedral. Instruction focused on tablature and figured bass as well as the harpsichord and organ. No records exist of the years following the end of his apprenticeship in spring of 1727.

On 9 November 1731, he became a tenor singer at St. Peter's Church in Leuven; he is also mentioned as a substitute for the Kapellmeister. This appointment was probably promoted by Rombout van Kiel, a canon of the St. Peter's Church and former classmate of father Michael van Beethoven.

By 2 September 1732, Beethoven is registered as a bass singer at Saint Lambert's Cathedral, Liège. This new appointment might be attributed to the support of Francois Stoupy, director of the Liège College in Leuven and friend of Rombout van Kiel.

In March 1733, Clemens August of Bavaria, archbishop-elector of Cologne, summoned Beethoven to his court in Bonn after hearing him sing in Liège, where Beethoven had been a substitute conductor:

"Once Ludwig van Beethoven senior was established there, his destitute parents also fled to Bonn."

In Bonn, Ludwig sang under the Kapellmeister Girolamo Donnini from 1733 until Donnini's death in 1752. His long-cherished hopes of one day becoming Kapellmeister himself went unfulfilled in 1760 when a much younger colleague, Joseph Touchemoulin, got the assignment instead. Unlike Beethoven, Touchemoulin was an experienced violinist and an accomplished composer.

On 6 February 1761, upon the death of Archbishop Clemens August of Bavaria, his successor Maximilian Friedrich von Königsegg-Rothenfels immediately began to implement strict austerity measures. Ludwig van Beethoven the Elder was made new Kapellmeister with the duties of singer and conductor combined. The disillusioned Touchemoulin consequently left Bonn to find work in Regensburg. As a separate occupation Ludwig van Beethoven the Elder maintained a wine trade business, which he had developed over the course of many years, exporting Rhine and Moselle wine to Flanders. Nothing is known about the volume, success and profitability of these undertakings.

On 24 December 1773, Ludwig van Beethoven the Elder died from a stroke in Bonn. Although he bequeathed debts to his son Johann, the father's holdings in commodities that were also bestowed on the son more than made up the difference, resulting in the total inheritance having a net surplus.

== Family ==
On 17 November 1733, Ludwig van Beethoven the Elder married Maria Josepha Poll (born Ball) (born about 1714, died 30 September 1775, Bonn). The marriage produced three children:

- Maria Ludovica Bernhardine van Beethoven (baptized 28 August 1734, Bonn, died 17 October 1735, Bonn)
- Mark Joseph van Beethoven (baptized 25 April 1736, Bonn, died unknown)
- Johann van Beethoven (born c. 1740, probably in Bonn, died 18 December 1792, Bonn); father of the composer Ludwig van Beethoven

The family of Ludwig van Beethoven the Elder initially resided in the former Jesuit college in Wenzelgasse, then in an estate, owned by master baker Fischer in Rheingasse 386 and finally in a coaching inn in Bonngasse 386, opposite the Beethoven-Haus (Bonngasse 515).

Maria van Beethoven was to become an alcoholic, which resulted in her being placed in a clinic until her death in 1775, and his son Johann was ultimately to descend into alcoholism as well. Their alcoholism may have been related to the family wine trade business.

== Assessments ==
Master baker Fischer described the appearance of Ludwig van Beethoven the Elder, of whom Amelius Radoux (1704 – c. 1773) had produced a contemporary oil portrait, as follows: "Stature of the court's Kapellmeister: A big beautiful man, learned man's face, broad forehead, round nose, large eyes, full red cheeks, very serious face". According to physician Franz Gerhard Wegeler, who later became a childhood friend of the composer Ludwig van Beethoven, Ludwig the Elder "was a small, vigorous man with extremely lively eyes".

Fischer and Wegeler describe him as a man with a serious and honorable character, diligent in professional practice and financial management, as well as being generally helpful and sociable.

Although his famous grandchild Ludwig van Beethoven was only three years old when Ludwig van Beethoven the Elder died, the younger Beethoven apparently had clear memories of his grandfather and developed a lasting love and admiration for him. In each of the countless times he changed lodgings during his years in Vienna, Beethoven would carry the Radoux oil portrait of his grandfather in person hurrying "to award it a place of honor" in the new home.
