= Kaspar Anton Karl van Beethoven =

Brother of Ludwig van Beethoven

- Born: Bonn, Electorate of Cologne, Holy Roman Empire
- Baptized: 8 April 1774
- Died: 15 November 1815 (aged 41); Vienna, Austrian Empire
- Occupation: Clerk
- Spouse: Johanna Reiß (m. 1806)
- Children: 2, including Karl
- Parents: Johann van Beethoven; Maria Magdalena Keverich
- Relatives: Ludwig van Beethoven (brother); Nikolaus Johann van Beethoven (brother)

Kaspar Anton Karl van Beethoven (baptized 8 April 1774 – 15 November 1815) was a German clerk and a brother of the composer Ludwig van Beethoven.

== Youth ==
Kaspar van Beethoven was born in Bonn, the second son of Johann van Beethoven and Maria Magdalena Keverich. He lost his mother at age 13 when she died on 17 July 1787. He trained as a music teacher.

== Career ==
In 1794, Kaspar moved from the family home in Bonn to Vienna, where Ludwig had moved not long before. Ludwig's biographer Thayer suggests that Ludwig at first helped him financially and also helped him in finding pupils. Soon he was self-supporting. Kaspar also tried his hand at musical composition, though he never reached any level of eminence in this area.

In 1800, Kaspar began working as a clerk in the Department of Finance. Also at this time he worked closely with Ludwig, serving as a part-time secretary and managing his business relations with music publishers. In this respect he is judged to have done a poor job; the publishers who dealt with him found him arrogant and tactless. Here is an example of the sort of letter he wrote to publishers (in this case, to the publisher Johann André in Offenbach):

Vienna, 23 November 1802

Dear Sir:

We have received your letter asking for some of my brother's pieces, for which we thank you very much.

At the moment we have nothing but a symphony and a grand piano concerto, each priced at 300 florins. If you should want three piano sonatas I shall have to have 900 florins for them, all in Viennese currency, and these you cannot have immediately, but one every five or six weeks, as my brother doesn't bother much any more with such trifles, but writes only oratorios, operas, etc.

We would expect eight copies of any piece you might print. In any case, whether you care for the pieces or not, please answer, because otherwise I would be delayed in selling them to somebody else.

We also have two adagios for violin with complete instrumental accompaniment which would cost 135 florins, and two little easy sonatas of two movements each which are yours for 280 florins. Please give my best wishes to our friend Koch.

Your most humble
K. v. Beethoven
R. k. Treasury Official

One publisher, Nicolaus Simrock, wrote a letter (30 July 1805) expressing his resentment at having to deal with Kaspar as follows: "I still understand German quite well, but I fail to comprehend what you wish to convey by the word "our" publishers and by "we". I bought the sonata Opus 47 from Louis van Beethoven, and in his letter about it there is no mention of a company."

Kaspar's work also created tension between the brothers. At one point (1801 or 1802) Kaspar sold his brother's recently completed set of piano sonatas (the three sonatas of Opus 31) to a publisher in Leipzig, when Beethoven had already promised them to the Nägeli publishing firm. According to Beethoven's early biographer Ferdinand Ries the resulting quarrel actually "came to blows." Kaspar did little work in representing his brother after 1806.

In 1809, Kaspar received a promotion at his government job, advancing to the position of Deputy Liquidator, at a salary of 1000 florins plus 160 for rent. Unfortunately for him, the Austrian government was in severe financial straits, and paid its bureaucrats in paper money, which circulated far below par. By this time, however, he was benefiting from rental income from a house in the Alservorstadt suburb, which his wife (see below) had inherited from her father.

== Family ==
On 25 May 1806 Kaspar married Johanna Reiß (1786–1869), who was six months pregnant with his son, whom they named Karl (1806–1858). Ludwig and Johanna were on bad terms from the start, and relations between the two brothers deteriorated after Kaspar's marriage.

Kaspar's home was the scene of an anecdote often told about Ludwig. The night of 11 August 1809, Vienna was shelled by Napoleon's invading army. The composer, already extremely concerned about his extensive hearing loss, took shelter in the cellar of his brother's house, covering his head with pillows in hopes that this would preserve what hearing he had left.

== Illness and death ==
In 1812, Kaspar fell ill with tuberculosis. Ludwig helped to support the family. He mentioned to the Princess Kinsky that he was "obliged to completely support an unfortunate sick brother and all his family."

When, in 1813, Kaspar's health began to seriously deteriorate, he signed a declaration appointing Ludwig guardian of his son, then aged six, in the event of his death. The same day, Ludwig granted him a loan of 1,500 florins, for which his wife stood security. Kaspar died on 15 November 1815. In his will dated the previous day, he assigned guardianship of his son both to his wife and to Ludwig, apparently hoping that the two would put aside their long-standing animosity. This effort failed entirely, as after his death Ludwig and Johanna engaged in a lengthy and bitter custody struggle over Karl; for details see Johanna van Beethoven.

== Compositions ==
- 12 Minuets for Orchestra, WoO 12 (1799)
- Piano Trio in D major, Anh. 3 (1799)
- Rondo for piano in B♭ major, Anh. 6 (1799)
