= Benedikt Beckenkamp =

German painter

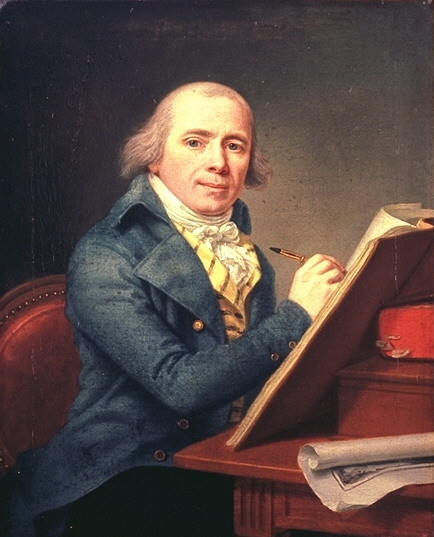
Self portrait, circa 1800

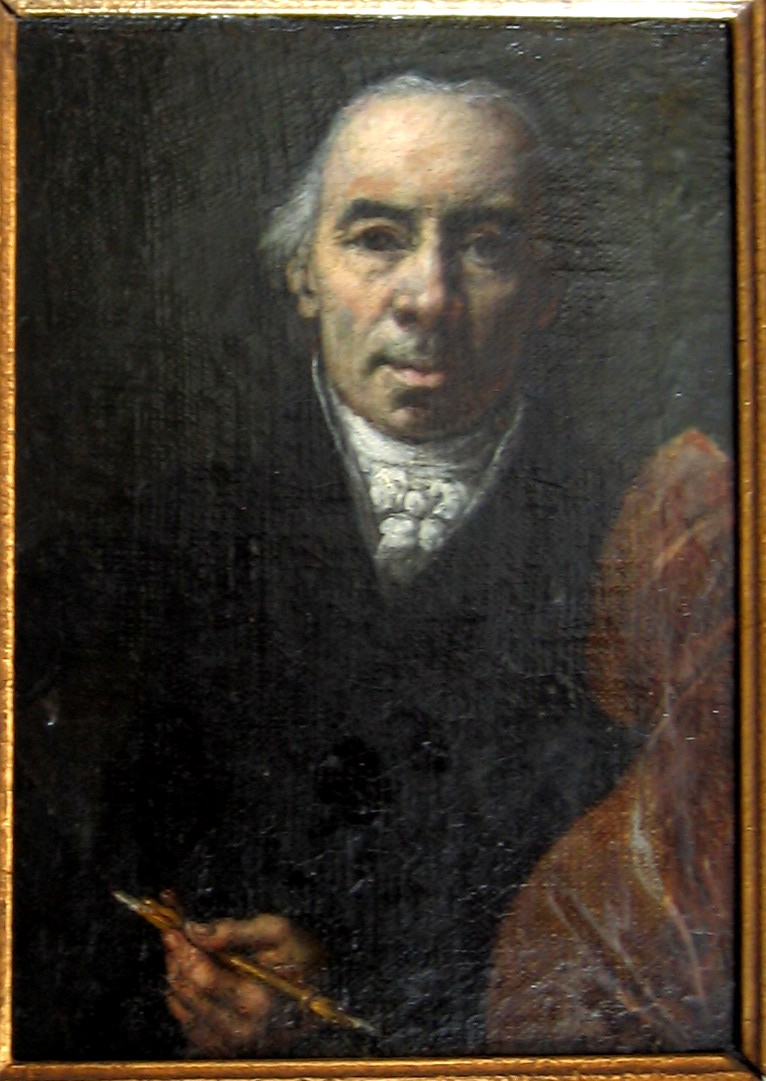
Self Portrait of Benedikt Beckenkamp

Johann (Kaspar) Benedikt Beckenkamp (1747–1828) was a German painter.

== Life ==
Beckenkamp was born in 1747 in the valley of Ehrenbreitstein, near Koblenz. He studied under his father, Lorenz Beckenkamp and Jan Zick, at Koblenz. At first, he devoted himself to painting landscapes, after C. G. Schütz; but later changed to portraiture. He settled at Cologne, and successfully imitated the style of painting of the old German masters.

Several portraits by Beckenkamp are in the Wallraf Museum, Cologne. For the church of St Maria Lyskirchen in Cologne, he painted a copy of a triptych with a central panel of the Pietà by Joos van Cleve, the original of which (now in the Städelsches Kunstinstitut in Frankfurt) had been sold a few years before.

He died in Cologne in 1828.

== See also ==
- List of German painters
