= Johanna van Beethoven =

Beethoven's sister-in-law (1786–1869)

- Born: Johanna Reiß c. 1786; Vienna, Austrian Empire
- Died: 2 February 1868 (aged 81–82); Vienna, Austrian Empire
- Spouse: Kaspar Anton Karl van Beethoven (m. 1806; died 1815)
- Children: 2, including Karl
- Relatives: Ludwig van Beethoven (brother-in-law); Nikolaus Johann van Beethoven (brother-in-law); Johann van Beethoven (father-in-law)

Johanna van Beethoven (née Reiß [Reiss]; c. 1786 – 2 February 1868) was the sister-in-law of the composer Ludwig van Beethoven. She is remembered for the bitter custody battle between herself and the composer over her son Karl, one of the ugliest and most traumatic episodes in the composer's life.

== Earlier years ==
She was the daughter of Anton Reiß (Reiss), a prosperous Viennese upholsterer. Her mother was the daughter of a wine merchant and local mayor.

She was accused of theft by her parents in 1804, an event that would later play a role in her lawsuit with Beethoven.

On 25 May 1806 she married the younger brother of Ludwig van Beethoven, Kaspar Anton Karl. Their only child, Karl van Beethoven, was born about three months later, on 4 September of the same year.

== Embezzlement and conviction ==
On 19 July 1811, Johanna agreed to sell a pearl necklace, worth 20,000 florins, on commission. The pearls were the joint property of three people: a Frau Kojowitz (who gave the necklace to Johanna to sell), Elisabeth Duchateau, and Josef Gessward. Johanna then faked a burglary in her home, breaking open chests and opening cupboards. When the "burglary" was discovered that evening, she hid the pearls in her reticule (purse). She then accused her former maid, named Anna Eisenbach, of the crime. The police interrogated Eisenbach for several days, then released her for lack of evidence.

In early August 1811, Johanna was found wearing one of the strings of the pearls (there were three total). Under police interrogation, she eventually confessed that she had sold the other two strings for 4000 florins to a man named Aaron Abineri. After some efforts by her husband Kaspar Karl, she was released from police custody on 12 August. The pearls were eventually recovered.

Her trial began on 27 December. It emerged that Johanna owed thousands of florins to various individuals; she complained that her husband (a government clerk) did not give her much money. On 30 December 1811, Johanna was convicted, both of embezzlement and of the crime of calumny, the latter with reference to the false accusation of Anna Eisenbach.

The court sentenced Johanna to one year of "severe imprisonment". By this it was meant that she would be placed in leg irons, limited to a meatless diet, forced to sleep on bare boards, and not allowed to converse with anyone but her jailers. Through the intervention of her husband, the sentence was gradually reduced, first to two months, then to just one, and in the end (thanks to an appeal to the Emperor) to the time already served before her trial. Her crime, like the theft in 1804, was adduced as part of Ludwig van Beethoven's case in the lawsuits to come.

After this episode, Johanna (and her husband, until his death in 1815) continued to live beyond their means and pile up debts. In 1818, Johanna sold the house (including rental units) in the suburb of Alservorstadt that she had bought with her husband in 1813, but she remained in debt.

== The custody battle with Beethoven ==
In 1812, Kaspar Karl contracted tuberculosis. By 1813, he was sufficiently ill to take out a court declaration specifying the care of his son Karl following his death. He chose Ludwig as the sole guardian. In 1815, two days before he died, he repeated this wish in his will, made out on 14 November. Yet on the same day a codicil was appended to the will which made Johanna co-guardian. Evidently, Beethoven and Johanna already got along very poorly, since Kaspar included in his will a remark that "the best of harmony does not exist between my brother and my wife". He continued, "God permit them to be harmonious for the sake of my child's welfare. This is the last wish of the dying husband and father."

This wish was entirely in vain, as with Kaspar's death two days later there began what Lewis Lockwood calls "a tortured and emotional legal struggle between Beethoven and his sister-in-law for the custody of the boy that lasted for more than four years and entailed perpetual rancor, court appearances, seeming successes, reversals, and appeals." Beethoven eventually emerged as victor in this struggle, but the consequences to Karl were almost certainly harmful (he was later to attempt suicide).

The legal battle began in a court called the Imperial and Royal Landrechte of Lower Austria, a court reserved for cases involving people of aristocratic birth. On 22 November, this court ruled that Johanna should be Karl's guardian and Beethoven co-guardian. On 28 November, Beethoven filed legal proceedings, making the case that Johanna was unfit to serve as guardian. This filing was successful, and on 9 January 1816 Beethoven was appointed sole guardian. On 2 February 1816, Beethoven enrolled Karl in a boarding school run by Cajetan Giannatasio del Rio.

Johanna, who had only very limited visitation rights, launched a legal counteroffensive in 1818. This time, the Landrechte discovered that the "van" in the Beethoven family name was not an earmark of nobility, and that jurisdiction should be returned to a commoner's court, the Vienna Magistracy. This court was considerably more sympathetic to Johanna, and also influenced by the fact that Karl had run away from Beethoven's home, fleeing to his mother (3 December). He had also been expelled from his school earlier in the year.

The final stage of the struggle took place in 1820, when Beethoven filed in the Court of Appeal. The skilled representation of Beethoven by his friend Johann Baptist Bach (as well as, perhaps, Beethoven's strong connections with the nobility) carried the day, awarding Beethoven permanent custody. Johanna's appeal to the Emperor in July was rejected, settling the case for good.

== Later life ==
In the same year that she lost her legal struggle, Johanna gave birth to an illegitimate daughter, who was named Ludovika Johanna, born 12 June 1820. A wealthy bell-founder named Johann Kaspar Hofbauer (c. 1771–1839) acknowledged himself as the father and provided some financial support.

In 1824, Johanna asked Beethoven for financial help. The composer did not dig into his own pocket, but he agreed to return to Johanna the half of her widow's pension that had been devoted to the education of Karl.

Beethoven died in 1827. Karl, who was the composer's sole heir, had not yet reached maturity and came under the guardianship of Johanna's relative Jakob Hotschevar, who had served as her legal counsel in the custody case.

Johanna van Beethoven long outlived her brother-in-law and died in 1869, also outliving her son, who died in 1858.

== Assessment ==
Beethoven had an extremely negative view of Johanna. In a late letter from September 1826 he called her "an extremely depraved person" and described her character as "evil, malevolent, and treacherous". On various occasions he called her the "Queen of the Night", referring to the villainess of Mozart's famous opera The Magic Flute.

There were others who shared Beethoven's view. Jakob Hotschevar, who had served as Karl's legal guardian, refused in 1830 to become the guardian of Johanna's daughter Ludovika. He informed the court that, because of Johanna's "far from praiseworthy moral conduct", he simply did not want to have any further contacts with her.

== Sources ==
- Brandenburg, Sieghard (1998). "Johanna van Beethoven's embezzlement". In Alan Tyson; Sieghard Brandenburg (eds.). Haydn, Mozart, and Beethoven: Studies in the Music of the Classical Period : Essays in Honour of Alan Tyson. Clarendon Press. ISBN 0-19-816362-2.
- Clive, H. Peter (2001). Beethoven and His World: A Biographical Dictionary. Oxford University Press. ISBN 0-19-816672-9.
- Kalischer, Alfred Christlieb [in German] (2014) [1909, London, J. M. Dent; New York, E. P. Dutton]. Beethoven's Letters: A Critical Edition With explanatory Notes. Vol. 2. Translated by John South Shedlock (reprint ed.). Cambridge University Press. ISBN 978-1-108-07846-7.
- Kerman, Joseph; Tyson, Alan; Burnham, Scott G.; Johnson, Douglas; Drabkin, William (2001). "Beethoven, Ludwig van". Grove Music Online (8th ed.). Oxford University Press. doi:10.1093/gmo/9781561592630.article.40026. ISBN 978-1-56159-263-0. (subscription, Wikilibrary access, or UK public library membership required)
- Lockwood, Lewis (2005). Beethoven: The Music and the Life. W. W. Norton. ISBN 0-393-32638-1.
- MacArdle, Donald W. (October 1949). "The Family van Beethoven". The Musical Quarterly. 35 (4): 528–550. doi:10.1093/mq/XXXV.4.528. JSTOR 739876.
