= Johann van Beethoven =

Father of Ludwig van Beethoven

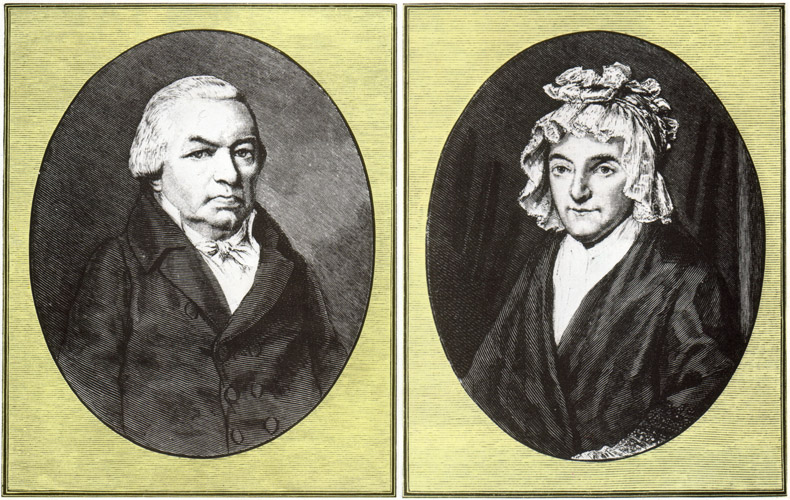
- Painting by Benedikt Beckenkamp, allegedly depicting Johann and Maria Magdalena van Beethoven. Whether the portrait is authentic or not is disputed, with Alexander Wheelock Thayer writing that it rests on "uncertain tradition" and it "lacks authoritative attestation".
- Born: c. 1739–1740; Bonn, Electorate of Cologne, Holy Roman Empire
- Died: 18 December 1792 (aged 51–53); Bonn, Electorate of Cologne, Holy Roman Empire
- Occupations: Teacher; singer; musician
- Spouse: Maria Magdalena Keverich (m. 1767; died 1787)
- Children: 7, including Ludwig, Kaspar, and Nikolaus
- Parent: Ludwig van Beethoven (father)

Johann van Beethoven (c. 1739–1740 – 18 December 1792) was a German teacher, singer, and musician who sang in the chapel of the Archbishop of Cologne, whose court was at Bonn. He is best known as the father of the celebrated composer Ludwig van Beethoven (1770–1827). Johann became an alcoholic later in his life and was at times an abusive father to Ludwig. At 18, Ludwig had to obtain an order to force Johann to support his family. Johann died soon after Ludwig moved to Vienna to study with Joseph Haydn.

== Life ==
Johann van Beethoven was the son of Maria Josepha Poll (married 1733) and Lodewijk or Ludwig van Beethoven (1712–1773; not to be confused with Johann's famous son of the same name), who was probably born in or near the city of Mechelen, in the Habsburg Netherlands (now in Flanders, Belgium), and had served as a musician in several communities in and around Mechelen before establishing himself in Bonn in 1733, where he served as a musician at the court of Prince-Archbishop-Elector of Cologne Clemens August of Bavaria, rising to the post of Kapellmeister in 1761. Johann van Beethoven also showed musical talent, and joined the court, primarily as a singer, in 1764. In addition to singing (his range, while usually described as that of a tenor, may have extended into alto and even higher registers), he played the violin and zither, and played and taught keyboard instruments of the day, including the harpsichord and the clavichord.

He met his future wife, Maria Magdalena Keverich (1746–1787), on a trip to Ehrenbreitstein. She was the daughter of the head chef to Johann IX Philipp von Walderdorff, Archbishop-Elector of Trier, whose court was there, and she had family connections in the court orchestra at Bonn. Keverich was already widowed at the age of nineteen. She and Johann were married on 12 November 1767 in the Catholic Church of St Remigius, Bonn. They had seven children, three of whom lived into adulthood:

- Ludwig Maria van Beethoven (2 April 1769 – 6 April 1769)
- Ludwig van Beethoven (16 December 1770 in Bonn, Kurköln – 26 March 1827)
- Kaspar Anton Karl van Beethoven (8 April 1774 – 15 November 1815)
- Nikolaus Johann van Beethoven (2 October 1776 – 12 January 1848)
- Anna Maria Franziska van Beethoven (23 February 1779 – 27 February 1779)
- Franz Georg van Beethoven (17 January 1781 – 16 August 1783)
- Maria Margarete Josepha van Beethoven (5 May 1786 – 26 November 1787)

Johann realized Ludwig's talent and became his first teacher. Johann was also aware of Leopold Mozart's success traveling with a talented and young Wolfgang, and wished to duplicate their fame and fortune. He was, however, an abusive father according to a number of witnesses. "There were few days when [Ludwig] was not beaten in order to compel him to set himself at the piano", related one childhood friend of Ludwig. A court councilor reported that Johann occasionally locked Ludwig in a cellar. Whenever Ludwig played poorly, Johann would exclaim that it was an embarrassment to the family. Johann would drag young Ludwig out of bed to play piano all night with no sleep. Johann was an alcoholic, a situation that worsened when Maria died in 1787, after which time the family was increasingly dependent on young Ludwig for support. In 1789 the 18-year-old Ludwig obtained an order resulting in one half of Johann's pay being turned over to him for support of the family.

Johann died in 1792, not long after Ludwig moved to Vienna to study with Joseph Haydn. His employer the Elector wrote sardonically to a friend, "The revenues from the liquor excise [tax] have suffered a loss in the death of Beethoven."

== Ancestry ==
The family name means "from (van) Bettenhoven". Johann van Beethoven was only one half from the Duchy of Brabant; his father Lodewijk was the last Beethoven to be fully from the Duchy of Brabant. Most of his most recent family came from the German-speaking Rhineland region and the Electorate of the Palatinate of the Holy Roman Empire.

== Descendants ==
Johann's famous son Ludwig van Beethoven had no children and was never married, but his second son, Karl, did have children. However, none of Karl's living descendants now bears the name of Beethoven, the last to do so, Karl Julius Maria van Beethoven, having died without a son in 1917.
