= Beethoven (Mähler) =

Two portraits of Beethoven by Joseph Willibrord Mähler

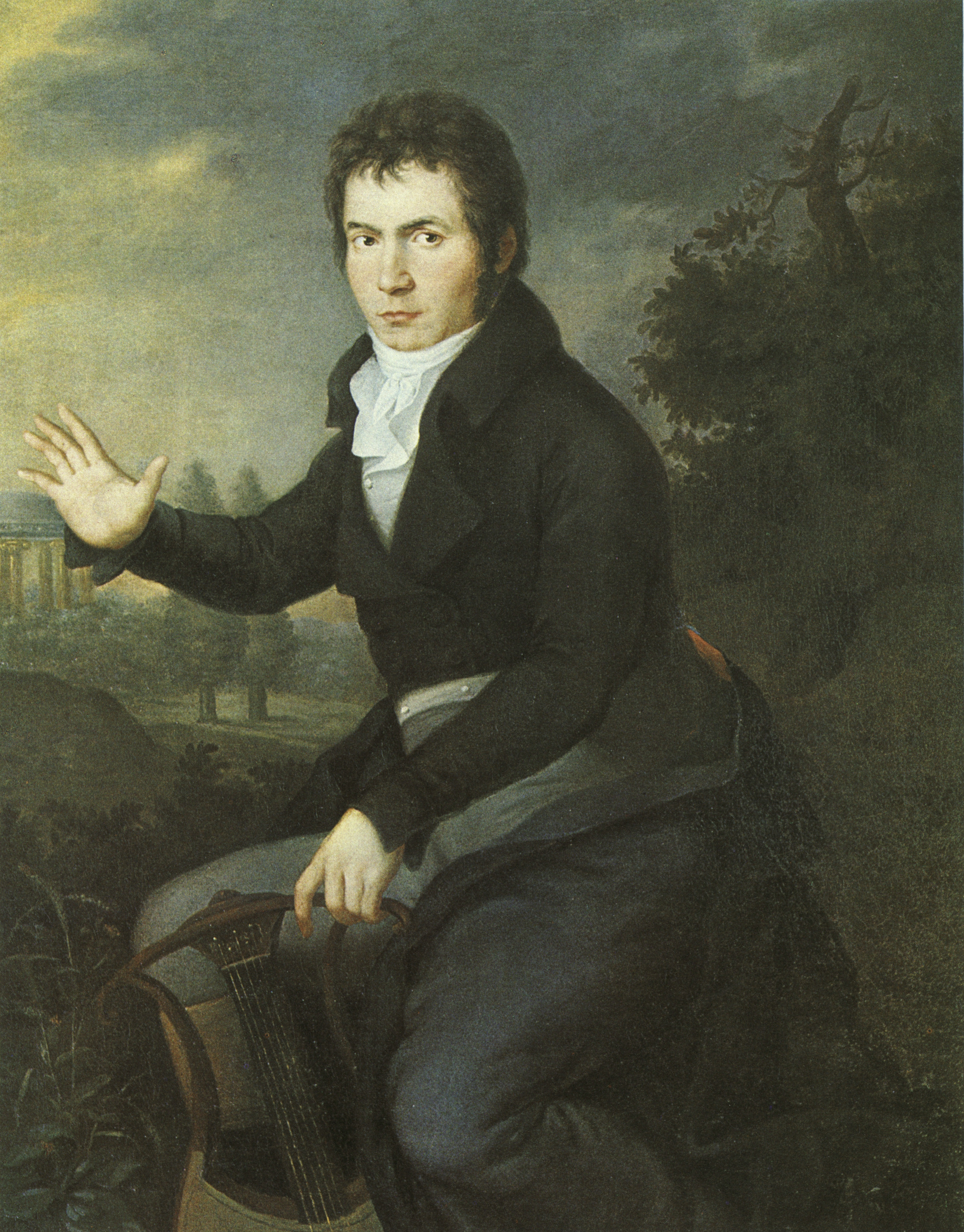
Mähler's portrait of 1804–05

There are at least two surviving portraits created by German painter Joseph Willibrord Mähler in oils of the composer Ludwig van Beethoven.

One, painted in approximately 1804 or 1805, is the first of up to four untitled portraits the painter made of the composer. Today it hangs in the Beethoven Museum in Probusgasse, Vienna, part of the Vienna Museum.

A copy of this painting, once owned by Beethoven's biographer Alexander Wheelock Thayer, is now owned by the New York Public Library.

Mähler's 1814 portrait of Beethoven exists in two versions, and is part of a series of portraits he made of Viennese composers at this time.

== The portrait of 1804–1805 ==
=== Background ===
Joseph Willibrord Mähler was introduced to Beethoven by the writer Stephan von Breuning (1774–1827). Though eventually a court secretary, Mähler was interested in music, was a good singer and did some composing. Beethoven took him to one rehearsal of Leonore in 1805.

What is known about the painting stems from Alexander Wheelock Thayer's biography. He first came across the original Mähler painting during a research visit (for his Beethoven biography) to Caroline Barbara van Beethoven (born Naske), the widow of Karl van Beethoven, the composer's nephew. Because Thayer owned a copy (see below), he was particularly interested in learning about the circumstances under which it was painted. He considered this painting the most interesting and engaging of the portraits he had encountered. He later interviewed Mähler on 24 May 1860. Thayer characterized the friendship between Beethoven and Mähler as one where composer's kindness was returned by Mähler with warm affection and admiration for composer's genius. In offering recollections of Beethoven, Mähler spoke of his 1804 portrait and wondered where it was. To his question, Thayer responded that it belonged to Karl van Beethoven's widow. Mähler then revealed that he had a copy of it.

Mähler painted four portraits of Beethoven. Only the first image, dated by Thayer at 1804–05, contains a nearly full view of the composer. Beethoven apparently liked this portrait very much and owned it until his death.

There are only three references to this portrait in contemporary Beethoven sources:

1. In the papers left by Beethoven there was an undated note to Mähler: "I beg of you to return my portrait to me as soon as you have made sufficient use of it—if you need it longer I beg of you at least to make haste—I have promised the portrait to a stranger, a lady who saw it here, that she may hang it in her room during her stay of several weeks. Who can withstand such charming importunities, as a matter of course a portion of the lovely favors which I shall thus garner will also fall to you";
2. A brief reference in Anton Schindler's biography, noting its "insignificance";
3. In his Aus dem Schwarzspanierhause, Gerhard von Breuning (son of Stephan), provided a description of Beethoven's apartment. The portrait of Beethoven’s grandfather was prominently displayed in the entry hall, while the Mähler portrait was on the back wall of a storage room where visitors were never admitted.

The portrait presently hangs in the Beethoven Museum in Probusgasse, Heiligenstadt, Vienna, a division of the Vienna Museum.

=== Symbolism ===
The historian Owen Jander discusses the symbolism embedded within Beethoven's fifth symphony and the portrait, hypothesizing that both works were a "ritualized confrontation" – a public yet veiled declaration of the composer's growing deafness, as a means of learning to accept it. Jander proposes that much of 18th to 19th century portrait painting can be considered self-portraits, commissioned at significant times in a person's life in which the details of the portrait were laid out by the subject. Elements such as the subject's pose, facial expression, clothing, accompanying objects and gestures are all part of the conventions of portraiture. Similarly, if any of these elements is depicted in such a way that diverges from typical depictions, that strengthens the message they intend to communicate by drawing in the viewer's attention. Contrasting gestures between right and left arm are typical and serve to sensitize the viewer to summon interpretation, or in the words of critic Philip Conisbee, a "narrative portrait with a didactic purpose."

Jander theorizes that an inspiration for Mähler's portrait is Leopold Radoux's 1773 portrait of Beethoven's grandfather, also named Ludwig van Beethoven (1712–1773), which the composer had prominently displayed in his apartment. Notably, one of the features of this portrait (painted the same year as the subject's death) was a cape falling off the back of the subject. To Jander, this represents the overcoming of grief that befell Beethoven's grandfather upon the death of his wife from alcoholism while maintaining a family life (his son Johann—the younger Ludwig van Beethoven's father—also suffered and eventually died from alcoholism). To understand the possible effect upon the composer, Jander cites 18th century mathematician and art theorist Johann Georg Sulzer who in his Allgemeine Theorie der schönen Künste provided an understanding on how an ancestor's portrait can have a healing effect on descendants. "The bonds of admiration and love between us and our ancestors are maintained and thus have a healing influence on the spirit, as though occasionally the deceased were still sitting among us….a portrait can make almost as powerful an impression upon us humans as can the person himself."

==== The plant ====
Jander notes that plant studies were part of the curriculum of the Dresden Art Academy where Mähler attended, so it is natural to expect plants in his graphic work. The plant at the bottom left of the portrait Jander identified as Polygonum bistorta, commonly known as knotweed. The nature of this plant is of inflorescence (a cluster of flowers on a branch). In the portrait there are groups of knotweed shown in various stages, from initial blossoming with pink to mature florets with the color receded. (Jander charactizes Beethoven as "nature-loving" and recalls the Heiligenstadt Testament where the composer wrote "as the leaves of autumn fall and are withered…," an allusion very similar to the one depicted in the portrait.) Jander proposes that the fading color of the plant is a metaphor to the composer's loss of hearing.

==== The lyre-guitar ====
Though Mähler described the instrument as a lyre, Jander identified it specifically as a lyre-guitar, an instrument popular in the early 19th century. The interpretation is that, with his hand holding the instrument, Beethoven draws forth music. But lyre-guitars normally have six strings, while the one Beethoven is holding has only five. With the pegs of the strings arranged in two rows, Jander identified the missing string as being one of the higher-pitched strings, suggesting a visual metaphor for Beethoven's inability to hear high frequencies.

==== The cape ====
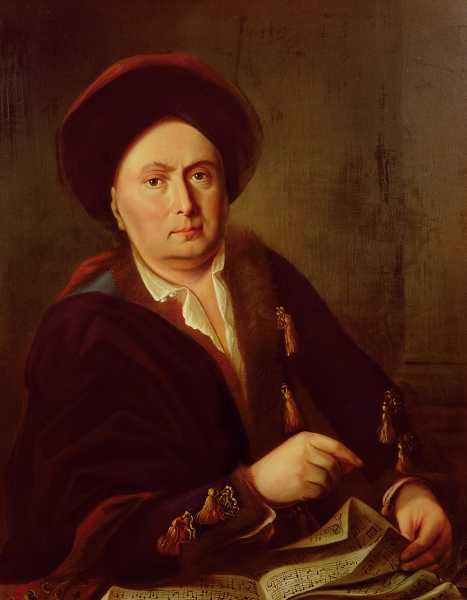
Leopold Radoux, Lodewijk van Beethoven, 1773 – Beethoven's grandfather. This portrait hung in the main room of the composer's apartment.

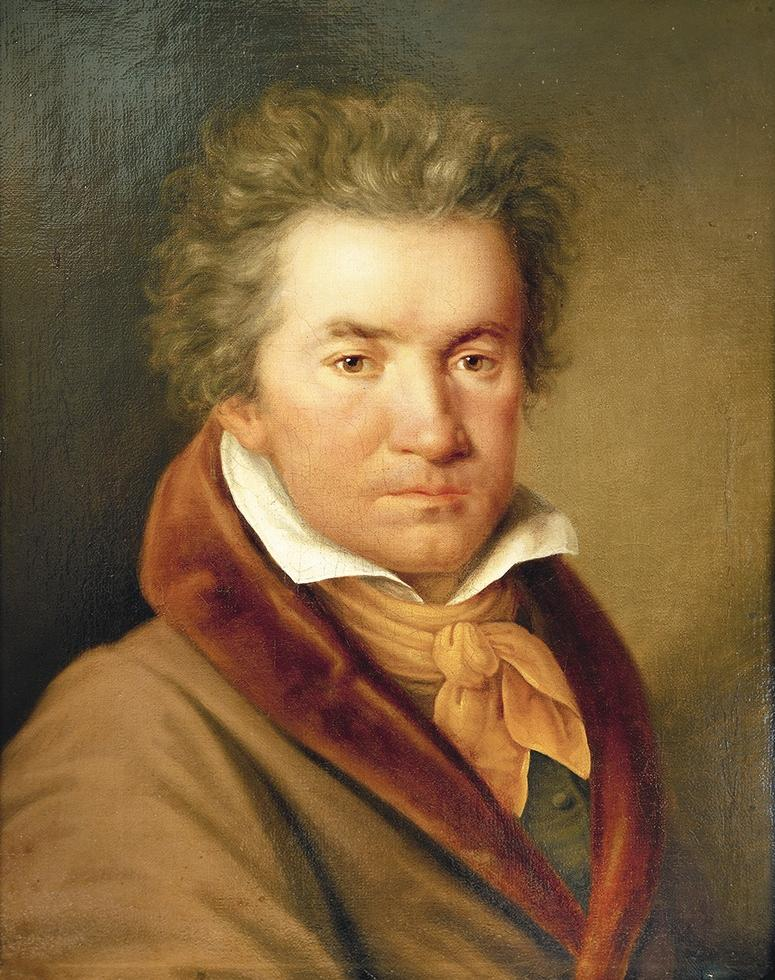
Mähler's 1814/15 portrait

Jander quotes Sulzer who described the arrangement of clothing in graphic art could depict "a soul agitated through passion." Below Beethoven's back there is a dark blue cape which has fallen from his shoulders. Most of the cape lies in a heap in the lower right hand corner of the picture, which "intensifies the message of divestment." In part this is a reference to the painting of the composer's grandfather, whose falling cape represented the overcoming of grief.

==== The right hand ====
Sulzer (as quoted by Jander) said that gestures should never cause so much attention as to distract the viewer away from the face. The enigmatic nature of the depiction of Beethoven's right hand appears to have puzzled both Thayer and Jander. Thayer recalled Mähler offering a description: "...the right hand is extended, as if, in a moment of musical enthusiasm, he was beating time..." Thayer provided his own thoughts:

The extended right hand—though, like the rest of the picture, not very artistically executed—was evidently painted with care. It is rather broad for the length, is muscular and nervous, as the hand of a great pianist necessarily grows through much practice; but, on the whole, is neatly formed and well proportioned. Anatomically, it corresponds so perfectly with all the authentic description of Beethoven's person, that this alone proves it to have been copied from nature and not drawn after the painter's fancy. Whoever saw a long delicate hand with fingers exquisitely tapering, like Mendelssohn's, joined to the short stout muscular figure of a Beethoven or a Schubert?

Like Thayer, Jander says the ambiguous meaning of the right hand is due to Mähler's deficiency as an artist. Alessandra Comini observed that, in contradistinction to the portrait of his grandfather where his ancestor's hand is pointing at music already written, Beethoven's "hand rises, palm outward, in response to music heard and to be written down for the future."

==== The action ====
In Jander's interpretation "the composer projects himself as turning his back (quite literally) to the darkness, turmoil, and half-dead tree that dominate the area to his left. Musical instrument in hand, he projects himself as beginning to move toward the calm, sun-drenched field [and temple to Apollo] to his right." Just as music had rescued his grandfather from overwhelming grief, so too does music provide life's direction for Beethoven and solace from deafness.

== The portrait of 1814–1815 ==
Around 1815, Mähler produced a series of portraits showing contemporary Viennese composers, including, apart from Beethoven, Johann Nepomuk Hummel, Antonio Salieri, Ignaz von Seyfried and Michael Umlauf. Most of these portraits entered the collection of the Viennese music society, the Gesellschaft der Musikfreunde. As written in the music journal Allgemeine Musikzeitung in August 1815, "all of them distinguish themselves in a most creditable way through the effectual brush stroke, the descriptive resemblance and the distinctive expression of their soul". A half length portrait of Beethoven was part of the series. The painter created several versions of this portrait.

== Thayer's copy of the 1804–1805 portrait ==
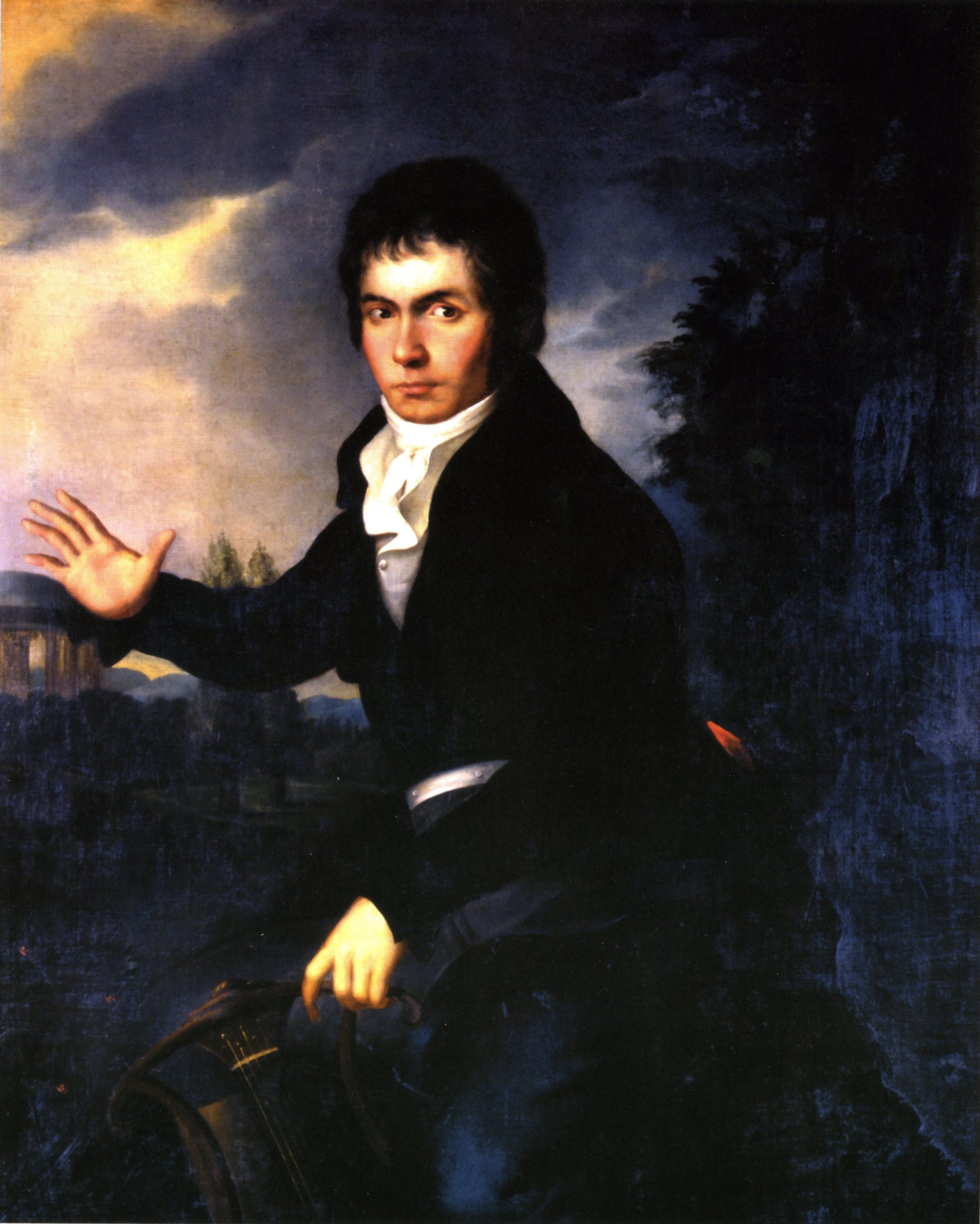
Thayer's copy of Mähler's 1804–05 portrait (c. 1808)

Estimated to have been painted around 1808, this painting is a copy by an unidentified painter of the portrait of Beethoven by Mähler. This copy was owned for many years by Alexander Wheelock Thayer, author of the first scholarly biography of the composer, who considered it one of his most prized possessions. Today the painting belongs to the New York Public Library.

Thayer estimated the copy of Mähler's portrait to have been painted approximately in 1808 by an unidentified artist (it is known that Mähler did not paint the copy himself). The date derives from a listing in an 1890 exhibition catalog for a Beethoven festival held in Bonn. Since Thayer was still living in 1890, musicologists Luigi Bellofatto and Owen Jander surmise that he must have personally lent the portrait for exhibition and most likely provided the date.

The earliest known owner of the portrait was Ferdinand Luib, editor of the noted musical journal, the Allgemeine musikalische Zeitung. Bellofatto and Jander hypothesize that Luib, having unsuccessfully compiled materials for a biography of Franz Schubert, recognized the same research drive in Thayer and presented him with the portrait as a gift. When Thayer was appointed US Consul to Italy, the portrait hung the American Consulate in Trieste. (Thayer held the position from 1865 until 1882). Upon Thayer's death in 1897, it was inherited by his niece Susan Elizabeth Fox. She donated it to the Beethoven Association, a New York-based group that came into existence for the purpose of translating Thayer's biography into English by producing chamber music concerts. (The translation by Henry Edward Krehbiel was first published by the Beethoven Association for its members in 1921).

In 1940, the Beethoven Association disbanded and donated its holdings (including the painting) to the New York Public Library. At its opening in 1965, the painting hung in the Music Division's Special Collections reading room of the New York Public Library for the Performing Arts. Since the 2001 renovation, the painting has hung in the Special Collections Reading Room named for Katherine Cornell and Guthrie McClintic.

== Bibliography ==
- Bellofatto, Luigi; Jander, Owen (2006), "Thayer's Copy of the Mähler Portrait of Beethoven, ca. 1804", Beethoven Journal, 21 (2): 13–15
- Claman, Henry D.; Bellofatto, Luigi D. (2007), "Alexander Wheelock Thayer: Brief life of Beethoven's biographer: 1817–1897", Harvard Magazine
- Comini, Alessandra (2008), The Changing Image of Beethoven: a Study in Mythmaking (Revised with a new foreword by the author ed.), Santa Fe, New Mexico: Sunstone Press, ISBN 978-0-86534-661-1
- Jander, Owen (2000), "'Let Your Deafness No Longer Be a Secret—Even in Art': Self-Portraiture and the Third Movement of the C-Minor Symphony", Beethoven Forum, 8 (1): 25–70
- Thayer, Alexander Wheelock (1921), The Life of Ludwig van Beethoven, New York: Beethoven Association
- Thayer, Alexander Wheelock (1967), Forbes, Elliot (ed.), Thayer's life of Beethoven, Princeton, New Jersey: Princeton University Press, ISBN 978-0-691-02702-9
- von Breuning, Gerhard (1874), Aus dem Schwarzspanierhause: Erinnerungen an L. van Beethoven aus meiner Jugendzeit, Vienna: L. Rosner
