= Symphony No. 5 (Beethoven) =

Musical composition by Ludwig van Beethoven

- by Ludwig van Beethoven
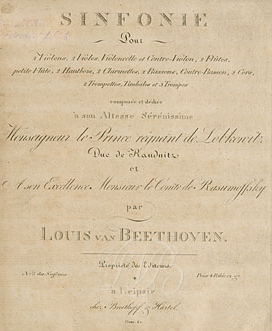
- Cover of the symphony, with the dedication to Prince J. F. M. Lobkowitz and Count Rasumovsky
- Key: C minor
- Opus: 67
- Composed: 1804–1808
- Dedication: J. F. M. Lobkowitz; Andreas Razumovsky
- Duration: 30–40 minutes
- Movements: 4
- Scoring: Orchestra

Premiere
- Date: 22 December 1808
- Location: Theater an der Wien, Vienna
- Conductor: Ludwig van Beethoven

The Symphony No. 5 in C minor, Op. 67 (occasionally known as the Fate Symphony, German: Schicksalssinfonie), is a symphony composed by Ludwig van Beethoven between 1804 and 1808. It is one of the best-known of all symphonies and one of the most frequently played. First performed in Vienna in 1808, the work achieved its strong critical reputation not long afterward; E. T. A. Hoffmann described it as "one of the most important works of the time".

The 5th Symphony has 4 movements. It begins with a distinctive 4-note "short-short-short-long" motif, often characterized as "fate knocking at the door", the Schicksals-Motiv (fate motif). Sometimes this motif is remembered as "da-da-da-dum" or "da da da DUM".

== History ==
=== Composition ===
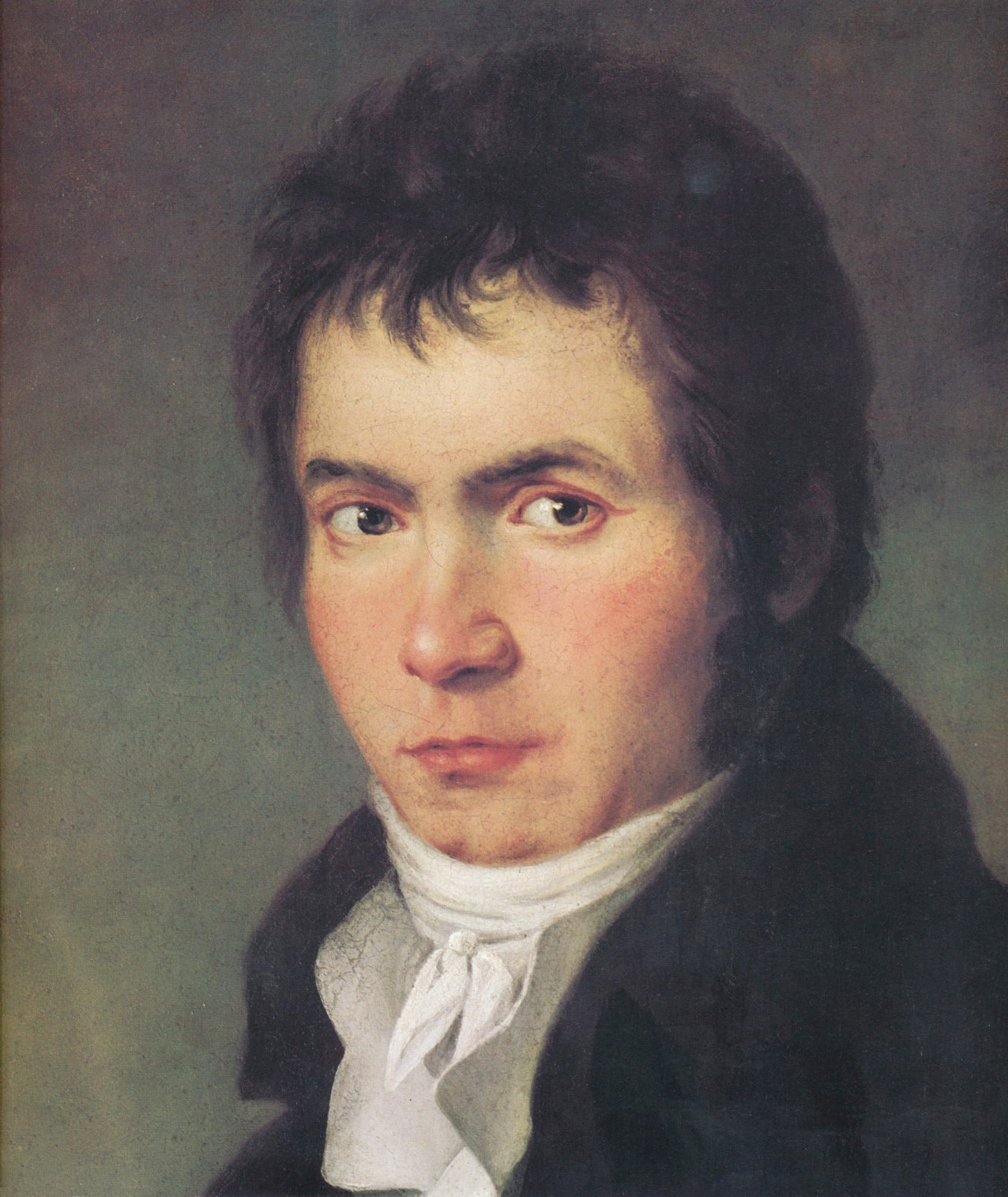
Portrait of Beethoven by W.J. Mähler ca.1804, the year the composer began work on the Fifth Symphony

The 5th Symphony falls squarely within what is called Beethoven's "Middle Period" of composition, starting from about 1803, when Beethoven chose to launch new works of unprecedented scope and ambition, often emphasizing the musical portrayal of heroism, as in the 3rd Symphony and the opera Fidelio. The process of composition for the 5th Symphony was lengthy and had frequent interruptions; the first sketches date from 1804, following the completion of the 3rd Symphony. Beethoven repeatedly interrupted his work on the 5th to prepare other compositions, including the original version of Fidelio, the Appassionata piano sonata, the three Razumovsky string quartets, the Violin Concerto, the Fourth Piano Concerto, the Fourth Symphony, and the Mass in C. The 5th and 6th Symphonies were completed simultaneously during 1807–1808, and both premiered at the same concert.

Beethoven was in his mid-30s during this time; his personal life was troubled by increasing deafness. In the world at large, the period was marked by the Napoleonic Wars, political turmoil in Austria, and the occupation of Vienna by Napoleon's troops in 1805. The symphony was written at his lodgings at the Pasqualati House in Vienna.

=== Premiere and dedication ===
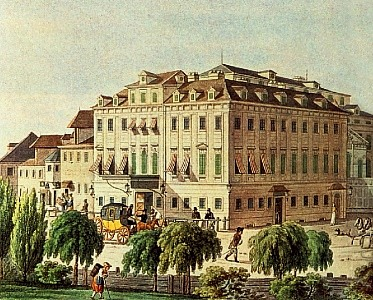
The Theater an der Wien as it appeared in the early 19th century

The 5th Symphony premiered on 22 December 1808 at a mammoth concert at the Theater an der Wien in Vienna consisting entirely of Beethoven premieres and lasting more than four hours. Beethoven himself directed the music.

Beethoven dedicated the 5th Symphony to two of his patrons, Prince Joseph Franz von Lobkowitz and Count Razumovsky. The dedication appeared in the first printed edition of April 1809.

=== Reception and influence ===
There was little critical response to the premiere performance, which took place under adverse conditions. The orchestra did not play well—with only one rehearsal before the concert—and at one point, following a mistake by one of the performers in the Choral Fantasy, Beethoven had to stop the music and start again. The auditorium was extremely cold and the audience was exhausted by the length of the programme. The critic for the Allgemeine musikalische Zeitung withheld judgment, noting that the works were long and complex, and that informed judgment awaited further performances.

Soon, the critic E. T. A. Hoffmann in the Allgemeine musikalische Zeitung weighed in on the symphony. His discussions in print offered both extravagant praise and a detailed analysis, in order to show his readers the devices Beethoven used to arouse particular affects in the listener. In an essay titled "Beethoven's Instrumental Music", compiled from this 1810 review and another one from 1813 on the op. 70 string trios, published in three installments in December 1813, Hoffmann further praised the "indescribably profound, magnificent symphony in C minor":

How this wonderful composition, in a climax that climbs on and on, leads the listener imperiously forward into the spirit world of the infinite!... No doubt the whole rushes like an ingenious rhapsody past many a man, but the soul of each thoughtful listener is assuredly stirred, deeply and intimately, by a feeling that is none other than that unutterable portentous longing, and until the final chord—indeed, even in the moments that follow it—he will be powerless to step out of that wondrous spirit realm where grief and joy embrace him in the form of sound....

As time went on and performances accumulated, the symphony gradually rose to the status it holds today. Even highly musical listeners sometimes needed more than one exposure to take in the work and understand it properly. This included the distinguished violinist and conductor Johann Peter Salomon, who earlier in his career had been responsible for bringing Joseph Haydn to England and commissioning his last twelve symphonies. Of an early British performance under Salomon's direction (15 April 1815), Craig writes:

When Salomon rehearsed this symphony with the Society members, he became frustrated and called it "rubbish." Sometime later, however, he retracted his statement before the members. After the first movement had been played in the rehearsal, Salomon laid down his violin and addressed the orchestra: "Gentlemen, some years ago I called this symphony rubbish; I wish to retract what I then said. I now consider it one of the great compositions I know."

The first French performance was led by François-Antoine Habeneck in about 1828 with the Société des Concerts du Conservatoire. In the United States, it was played in the inaugural concerts of the New York Philharmonic on 7 December 1842, and the [US] National Symphony Orchestra on 2 November 1931. It was first recorded by the Odeon Orchestra under Friedrich Kark in 1910.

Groundbreaking in terms of both its technical and its emotional impact, the Fifth has had a large influence on composers and music critics, and inspired work by such composers as Brahms, Tchaikovsky (his 4th Symphony in particular), Bruckner, Mahler, and Berlioz.

Since the Second World War, it has sometimes been referred to as the "Victory Symphony". "V" is coincidentally also the Roman numeral character for the number 5 and the phrase "V for Victory" became a campaign of the Allies of World War II after Winston Churchill starting using it as a catchphrase in 1940. During the Second World War, the BBC prefaced its broadcasts to Special Operations Executives (SOE) across the world with the four-note opening motif of the first movement (which resembles the Morse code for "V"), played on drums. This was at the suggestion of intelligence agent Courtenay Edward Stevens. The Italian conductor Arturo Toscanini also performed the first movement of this symphony following the fall of Benito Mussolini in September 1943, stating that he would perform the remaining movements after Germany was defeated. He completed the performance in May 1945.

== Instrumentation ==
The symphony is scored for the following orchestra:

Woodwinds
1 piccolo (fourth movement only)
2 flutes
2 oboes
2 clarinets in B♭ (first, second, and third movements) and C (fourth movement)
2 bassoons
1 contrabassoon (fourth movement only)

Brass
2 horns in E♭ (first and third movements) and C (second and fourth movements)
2 trumpets in C
3 trombones (alto, tenor, and bass, fourth movement only)

Percussion
timpani (in G–C)
Strings
violins I, II
violas
cellos
double basses

== Form ==
A typical performance usually lasts around 30–40 minutes. The work is in four movements:

1. Allegro con brio (5–8 minutes) (C minor)
2. Andante con moto (7–11 minutes) (A♭ major)
3. Scherzo: Allegro (4–9 minutes) (C minor)
4. Allegro – Presto (7–11 minutes) (C major)

=== I. Allegro con brio ===
I. Allegro con brio
Performed by the Fulda Symphonic Orchestra

The 1st movement opens with the 4-note motif discussed above, one of the most famous motifs in Western music.

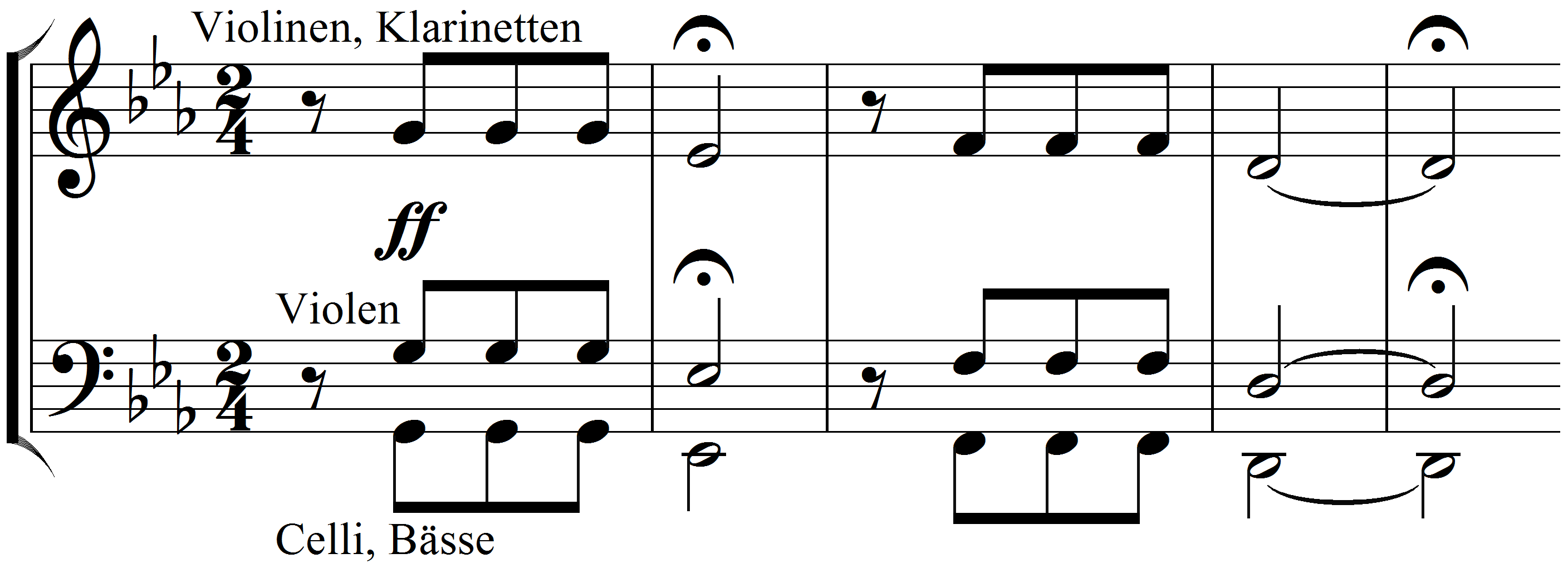
Opening bars of the symphony

The movement continues in sonata form, the standard form for first movements that Beethoven inherited from his Classical predecessors Haydn and Mozart. There is an exposition, which establishes a secondary key of E flat major and is repeated; a development section that recuts and redeploys the musical material in various ways; a recapitulation, which repeats the themes of the exposition largely in the home key of C; and a massive coda. The particular variety of sonata form Beethoven uses was earlier a favorite of Haydn: most of the themes are developed from one single motif, i.e. the 4-note passage heard at the opening. The movement is terse and is indeed the shortest of all of Beethoven's symphonic first movements. Different listeners will hear the effect of the movement differently, but a common perception is that it is intense, stormy and impassioned; one commentator suggests "The first movement erupts from the orchestra with alarming ferocity."

The recapitulation section involves one startling interruption: all but the first oboe player fall silent as the latter plays a brief and mournful recitative, marked adagio.

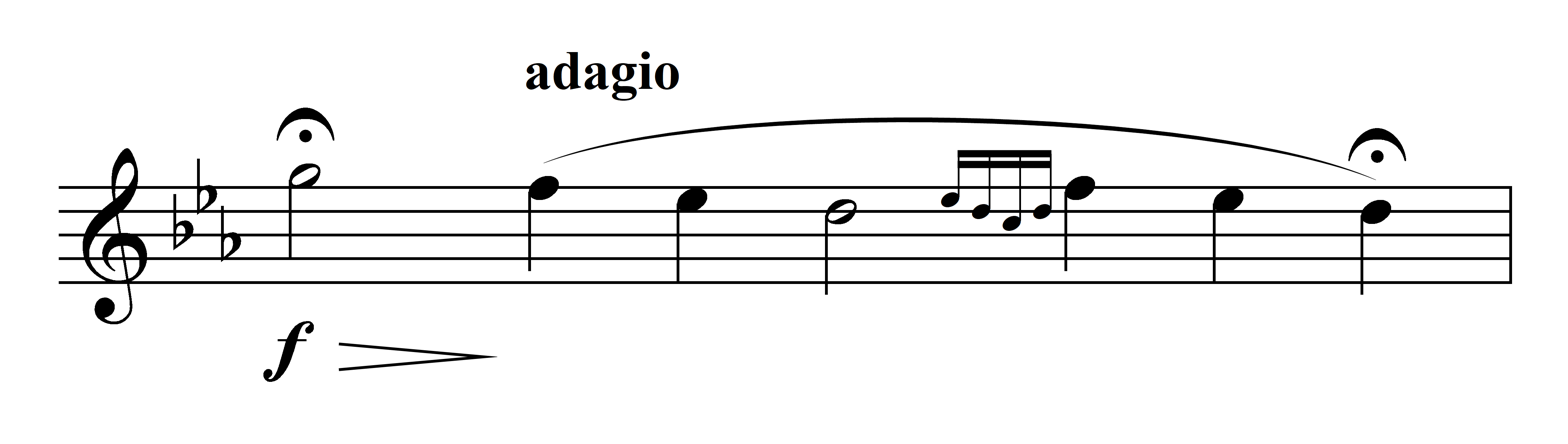

The music then resumes at tempo with renewed intensity.

Conductors differ in how they direct the four opening bars. Many observe the composer's tempo mark, starting the movement at allegro con brio with two fermatas. Others seek to add weight by playing the motif in a slower and more stately tempo; still others add on to this approach a molto ritardando; i.e. slowing down.

=== II. Andante con moto ===
II. Andante con moto
Performed by the Fulda Symphonic Orchestra

The 2nd movement, in A♭ major, the subdominant key of C minor's relative key (E♭ major), is a lyrical work in double variation form, which means that two themes are presented and varied in alternation.

The first theme, with which the movement opens, is given below. At its first appearance, it is given by violas and cellos, with accompaniment by the double basses.

And the second theme is:

Following the variations there is a long coda.

=== III. Scherzo: Allegro ===
III. Allegro
Performed by the Fulda Symphonic Orchestra

The 3rd movement is in ternary form, consisting of a scherzo and trio. Beethoven started using a scherzo as a 3rd movement in his 2nd Symphony (breaking with the tradition of using a minuet as a 3rd movement). He retained the practice in all his later symphonies, with the exception of No. 8.

The movement returns to the opening key of C minor and begins with the following theme, played by the cellos and double basses:

The opening theme is answered by a contrasting theme played by the winds, and this sequence is repeated. Then the horns loudly announce the main theme of the movement, and the music proceeds from there. The trio section is in C major and is written in a contrapuntal texture, opening with a solo passage for the cellos and basses.

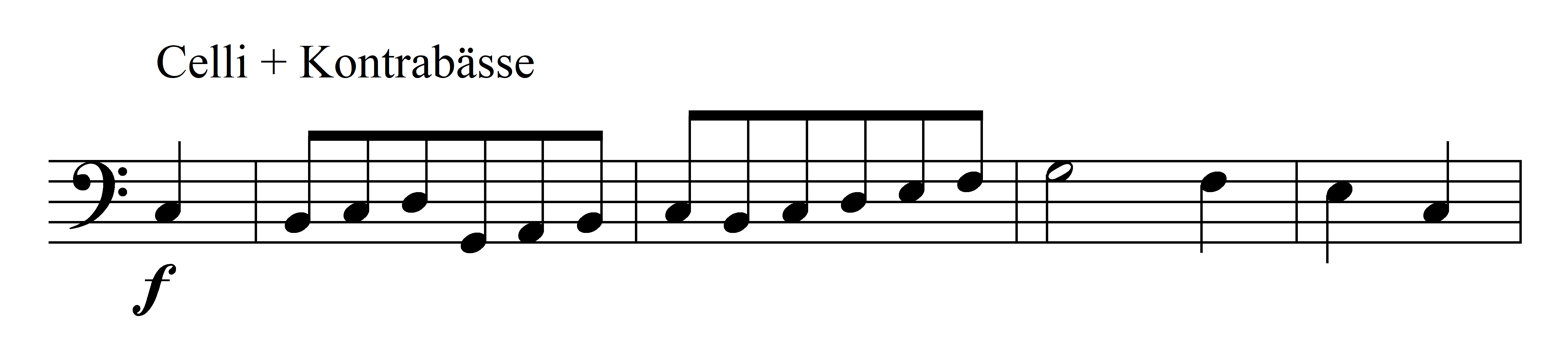

When the scherzo returns for the final time, it is performed by the strings pizzicato and very quietly. "The scherzo offers contrasts that are somewhat similar to those of the slow movement [Andante con moto] in that they derive from extreme difference in character between scherzo and trio ... The Scherzo then contrasts this figure with the famous 'motto' (3 + 1) from the first movement, which gradually takes command of the whole movement."

The third movement does not end with a pause, but rather with a transition passage to the final movement. This transition begins pianissimo with a long sequence of repeated timpani notes, then shift to a tremendous crescendo, and the finale is played attacca.

=== IV. Allegro ===
IV. Allegro
Performed by the Fulda Symphonic Orchestra

The triumphant and exhilarating finale begins with the following theme:

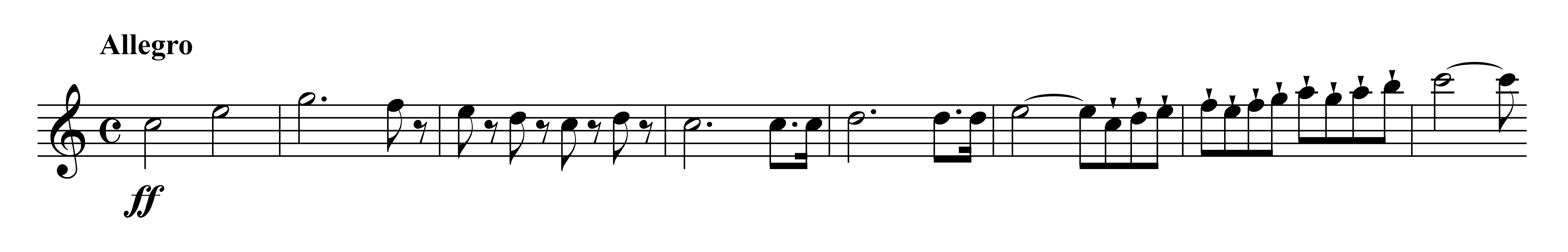

The sound becomes suddenly much louder: the first three movements were composed for a Classical orchestra, with the parts identical to those needed to perform (e.g.) Mozart's Jupiter Symphony, but at the outset of the finale 5 players join in who have hitherto been silent: 3 trombones, contrabassoon, and piccolo. The music is in the symphony's home key of C, but now in the major mode. Lewis Lockwood suggested that shifting to major mode for the final movement is unusual for Beethoven, though there are several precedents in Mozart and Haydn's work, and Beethoven himself continued the practice in his 9th Symphony and last piano sonata.

The 5th Symphony finale is written in an unusual variant of sonata form: at the end of the development section, the music halts on a dominant cadence, played fortissimo, and the music continues after a pause with a quiet reprise of the "horn theme" of the scherzo movement. The recapitulation is then introduced by a crescendo coming out of the last bars of the interpolated scherzo section, just as the same music was introduced at the opening of the movement. The interruption of the finale with material from the third "dance" movement was pioneered by Haydn, who had done the same in his Symphony No. 46 in B, from 1772. It is unknown whether Beethoven was familiar with this work or not.

The 5th Symphony finale includes a very long coda, in which the main themes of the movement are played in temporally compressed form. Towards the end the tempo is increased to presto. The symphony ends with 29 bars of C major chords, played fortissimo. In The Classical Style, Charles Rosen suggests that this ending reflects Beethoven's sense of proportion: the "unbelievably long" pure C major cadence is needed "to ground the extreme tension of [this] immense work."

== Influences ==
The 19th century musicologist Gustav Nottebohm first pointed out that the third movement's theme has the same sequence of intervals as the opening theme of the final movement of Mozart's famous Symphony No. 40 in G minor, K. 550. Here are the first eight notes of Mozart's theme:

While such resemblances sometimes occur by accident, this is unlikely to be so in the present case. Nottebohm discovered the resemblance when he examined a sketchbook used by Beethoven in composing the 5th Symphony: here, 29 bars of Mozart's finale appear, copied out by Beethoven.

== Critical commentary ==
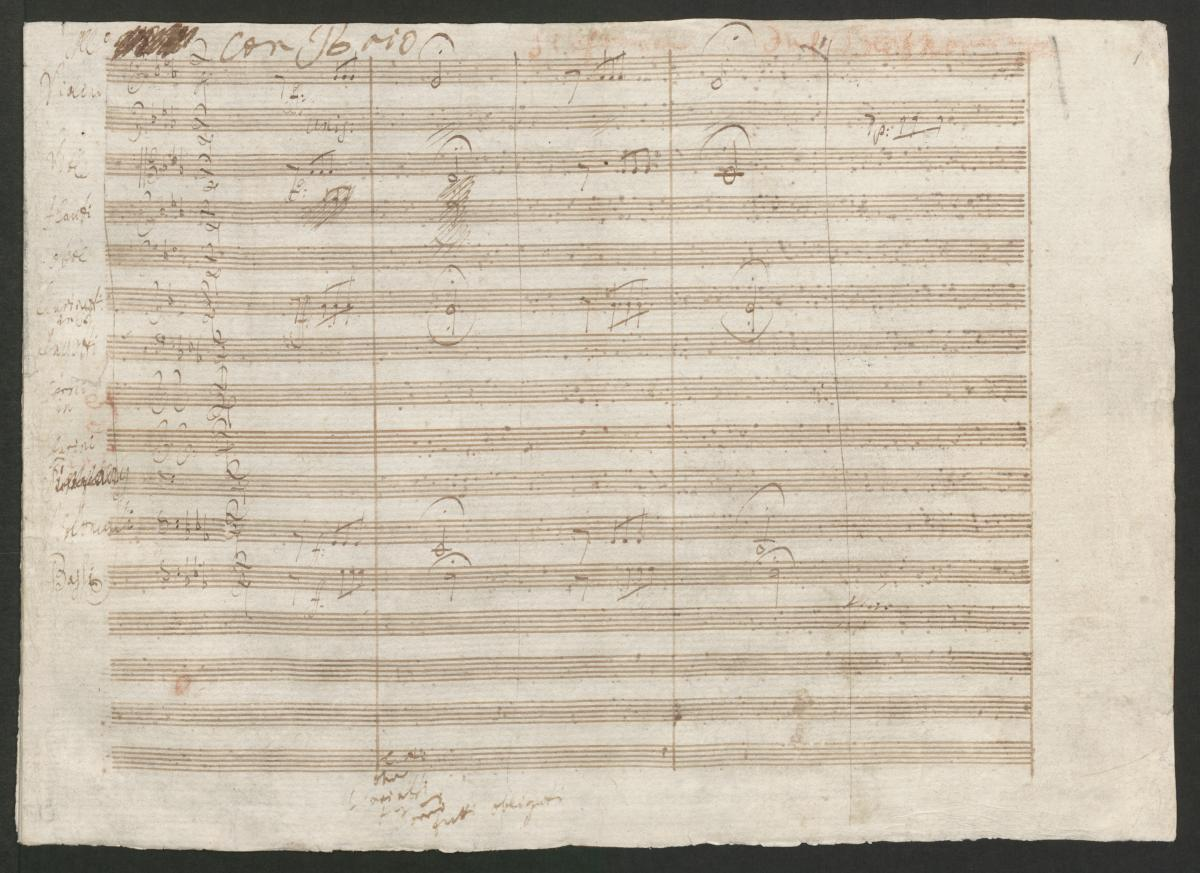
The opening bars, in the composer's hand (1807)

Much has been written about the 5th Symphony in books, scholarly articles, and program notes for live and recorded performances. This section summarizes some themes that commonly appear in this material.

=== Fate motif ===
The initial motif of the symphony has sometimes been credited with symbolic significance as a representation of Fate knocking at the door. This idea comes from Beethoven's secretary and factotum Anton Schindler, who wrote, many years after Beethoven's death:

The composer himself provided the key to these depths when one day, in this author's presence, he pointed to the beginning of the first movement and expressed in these words the fundamental idea of his work: "Thus Fate knocks at the door!"

Schindler's testimony concerning any point of Beethoven's life is disparaged by many experts (Schindler is believed to have forged entries in Beethoven's so-called "conversation books", the books in which the deaf Beethoven got others to write their side of conversations with him). Moreover, it is often commented that Schindler offered a highly romanticized view of the composer.

There is another tale concerning the same motif; the version given here is from Antony Hopkins's description of the symphony. Carl Czerny (Beethoven's pupil, who premiered the "Emperor" Concerto in Vienna) claimed that "the little pattern of notes had come to [Beethoven] from a yellow-hammer's song, heard as he walked in the Prater-park in Vienna." Hopkins further remarks that "given the choice between a yellow-hammer and Fate-at-the-door, the public has preferred the more dramatic myth, though Czerny's account is too unlikely to have been invented."

In his Omnibus television lecture series in 1954, Leonard Bernstein likened the Fate Motif to the 4-note coda common to symphonies. These notes would terminate the symphony as a musical coda, but for Beethoven they become a motif repeating throughout the work for a very different and dramatic effect, he says.

Evaluations of these interpretations tend to be skeptical. "The popular legend that Beethoven intended this grand exordium of the symphony to suggest 'Fate Knocking at the gate' is apocryphal; Beethoven's pupil, Ferdinand Ries, was really author of this would-be poetic exegesis, which Beethoven received very sarcastically when Ries imparted it to him." Elizabeth Schwarm Glesner remarks that "Beethoven had been known to say nearly anything to relieve himself of questioning pests"; this might be taken to impugn both tales.

=== Beethoven's choice of key ===
The key of the Fifth Symphony, C minor, is commonly regarded as a special key for Beethoven, specifically a "stormy, heroic tonality". Beethoven wrote a number of works in C minor whose character is broadly similar to that of the 5th Symphony. Pianist and writer Charles Rosen says,

Beethoven in C minor has come to symbolize his artistic character. In every case, it reveals Beethoven as Hero. C minor does not show Beethoven at his most subtle, but it does give him to us in his most extroverted form, where he seems to be most impatient of any compromise.

=== Repetition of the opening motif throughout the symphony ===
It is commonly asserted that the opening 4-note rhythmic motif (short-short-short-long; see above) is repeated throughout the symphony, unifying it. "It is a rhythmic pattern (dit-dit-dit-dot) that makes its appearance in each of the other 3 movements and thus contributes to the overall unity of the symphony" (Doug Briscoe); "a single motif that unifies the entire work" (Peter Gutmann); "the key motif of the entire symphony"; "the rhythm of the famous opening figure ... recurs at crucial points in later movements" (Richard Bratby). The New Grove encyclopedia cautiously endorses this view, reporting that "[t]he famous opening motif is to be heard in almost every bar of the first movement—and, allowing for modifications, in the other movements."

There are several passages in the symphony that have led to this view. For instance, in the third movement the horns play the following solo in which the short-short-short-long pattern occurs repeatedly:

In the second movement, an accompanying line plays a similar rhythm:

In the finale, Doug Briscoe suggests that the motif may be heard in the piccolo part, presumably meaning the following passage:

Later, in the coda of the finale, the bass instruments repeatedly play the following:

On the other hand, some commentators are unimpressed with these resemblances and consider them to be accidental. Antony Hopkins, discussing the theme in the scherzo, says "no musician with an ounce of feeling could confuse [the two rhythms]", explaining that the scherzo rhythm begins on a strong musical beat whereas the first-movement theme begins on a weak one. Donald Tovey pours scorn on the idea that a rhythmic motif unifies the symphony: "This profound discovery was supposed to reveal an unsuspected unity in the work, but it does not seem to have been carried far enough." Applied consistently, he continues, the same approach would lead to the conclusion that many other works by Beethoven are also "unified" with this symphony, as the motif appears in the "Appassionata" piano sonata, the Fourth Piano Concerto, and in the String Quartet, Op. 74. Tovey concludes, "the simple truth is that Beethoven could not do without just such purely rhythmic figures at this stage of his art."

To Tovey's objection can be added the prominence of the short-short-short-long rhythmic figure in earlier works by Beethoven's older Classical contemporaries such as Haydn and Mozart. To give just two examples, it is found in Haydn's "Miracle" Symphony, No. 96 and in Mozart's Piano Concerto No. 25, K. 503. Such examples show that "short-short-short-long" rhythms were a regular part of the musical language of the composers of Beethoven's day.

=== Use of La Folia ===
La Folia Variation (measures 166–176)

Folia is a dance form with a distinctive rhythm and harmony, which was used by many composers from the Renaissance well into the 19th and even 20th centuries, often in the context of a theme and variations. It was used by Beethoven in his 5th Symphony in the harmony midway through the slow movement (bars 166 to 177). Although some recent sources mention that the fragment of the Folia theme in Beethoven's symphony was detected only in the 1990s, Reed J. Hoyt analyzed some Folia-aspects in the oeuvre of Beethoven already in 1982 in his "Letter to the Editor", in the journal College Music Symposium 21, where he draws attention to the existence of complex archetypal patterns and their relationship.

=== New instrumentation ===
The last movement of Beethoven's 5th is the first time the piccolo and contrabassoon were used in a symphony. While this was Beethoven's first use of the trombone in a symphony, in 1807 the Swedish composer Joachim Nicolas Eggert had specified trombones for his Symphony No. 3 in E♭ major.

== Textual questions ==
=== Third movement repeat ===
In the autograph score (that is, the original version from Beethoven's hand), the 3rd movement contains a repeat mark: when the scherzo and trio sections have both been played through, the performers are directed to return to the very beginning and play these two sections again. Then comes a third rendering of the scherzo, this time notated differently for pizzicato strings and transitioning directly to the finale (see description above). Most modern printed editions of the score do not render this repeat mark; and indeed, most performances of the symphony render the movement as ABA' (where A = scherzo, B = trio, and A' = modified scherzo), in contrast to the ABABA' of the autograph score. The repeat mark in the autograph is unlikely to be simply an error on the composer's part. The ABABA' scheme for scherzi appears elsewhere in Beethoven, in the Bagatelle for solo piano, Op. 33, No. 7 (1802), and in the 4th, 6th, and 7th Symphonies. However, it is possible that for the 5th Symphony, Beethoven originally preferred ABABA', but changed his mind in the course of publication in favor of ABA'.

Since Beethoven's day, published editions of the symphony have always printed ABA'. However, in 1978 an edition specifying ABABA' was prepared by Peter Gülke and published by Peters. In 1999, yet another edition, by Jonathan Del Mar, was published by Bärenreiter which advocates a return to ABA'. In the accompanying book of commentary, Del Mar defends in depth the view that ABA' represents Beethoven's final intention; in other words, that conventional wisdom was right all along.

In concert performances, ABA' prevailed until the 2000s. However, since the appearance of the Gülke edition, conductors have felt more free to exercise their own choice. Performances with ABABA' seem to be particularly favored by conductors who specialize in authentic performance or historically informed performance (that is, using instruments of the kind employed in Beethoven's day and playing techniques of the period). These include Caroline Brown, Christopher Hogwood, John Eliot Gardiner, and Nikolaus Harnoncourt. ABABA' performances on modern instruments have also been recorded by the New Philharmonia Orchestra under Pierre Boulez, the Tonhalle-Orchester Zürich under David Zinman, and the Berlin Philharmonic under Claudio Abbado.

=== Reassigning bassoon notes to the horns ===
In the first movement, the passage that introduces the second subject of the exposition is assigned by Beethoven as a solo to the pair of horns.

At this location, the theme is played in the key of E♭ major. When the same theme is repeated later on in the recapitulation section, it is given in the key of C major. Antony Hopkins writes:

This ... presented a problem to Beethoven, for the horns [of his day], severely limited in the notes they could actually play before the invention of valves, were unable to play the phrase in the 'new' key of C major—at least not without stopping the bell with the hand and thus muffling the tone. Beethoven therefore had to give the theme to a pair of bassoons, who, high in their compass, were bound to seem a less than adequate substitute. In modern performances the heroic implications of the original thought are regarded as more worthy of preservation than the secondary matter of scoring; the phrase is invariably played by horns, to whose mechanical abilities it can now safely be trusted.

In fact, even before Hopkins wrote this passage (1981), some conductors had experimented with preserving Beethoven's original scoring for bassoons. This can be heard on many performances including those conducted by Caroline Brown mentioned in the preceding section as well as in a 2003 recording by Simon Rattle with the Vienna Philharmonic. Although horns capable of playing the passage in C major were developed not long after the premiere of the Fifth Symphony (they were developed in 1814), it is not known whether Beethoven would have wanted to substitute modern horns, or keep the bassoons, in the crucial passage.

== Editions ==
- The edition by Jonathan Del Mar mentioned above was published as follows: Ludwig van Beethoven. Symphonies 1–9. Urtext. Kassel: Bärenreiter, 1996–2000, ISMN M-006-50054-3.
- An inexpensive version of the score has been issued by Dover Publications. This is a 1989 reprint of an old edition (Braunschweig: Henry Litolff, no date).

== As adapted by later composers ==
Franz Liszt arranged the 5th Symphony for piano solo in his Symphonies de Beethoven, S. 464.
