= Stephan von Breuning =

Stephan von Breuning may refer to:

- Stephan von Breuning (librettist) (1774–1827), German librettist, friend and collaborator of Ludwig van Beethoven
- Stephan von Breuning (entomologist) (1894–1983), Austrian entomologist
