= Alexander Wheelock Thayer =

American librarian and journalist (1817–1897)

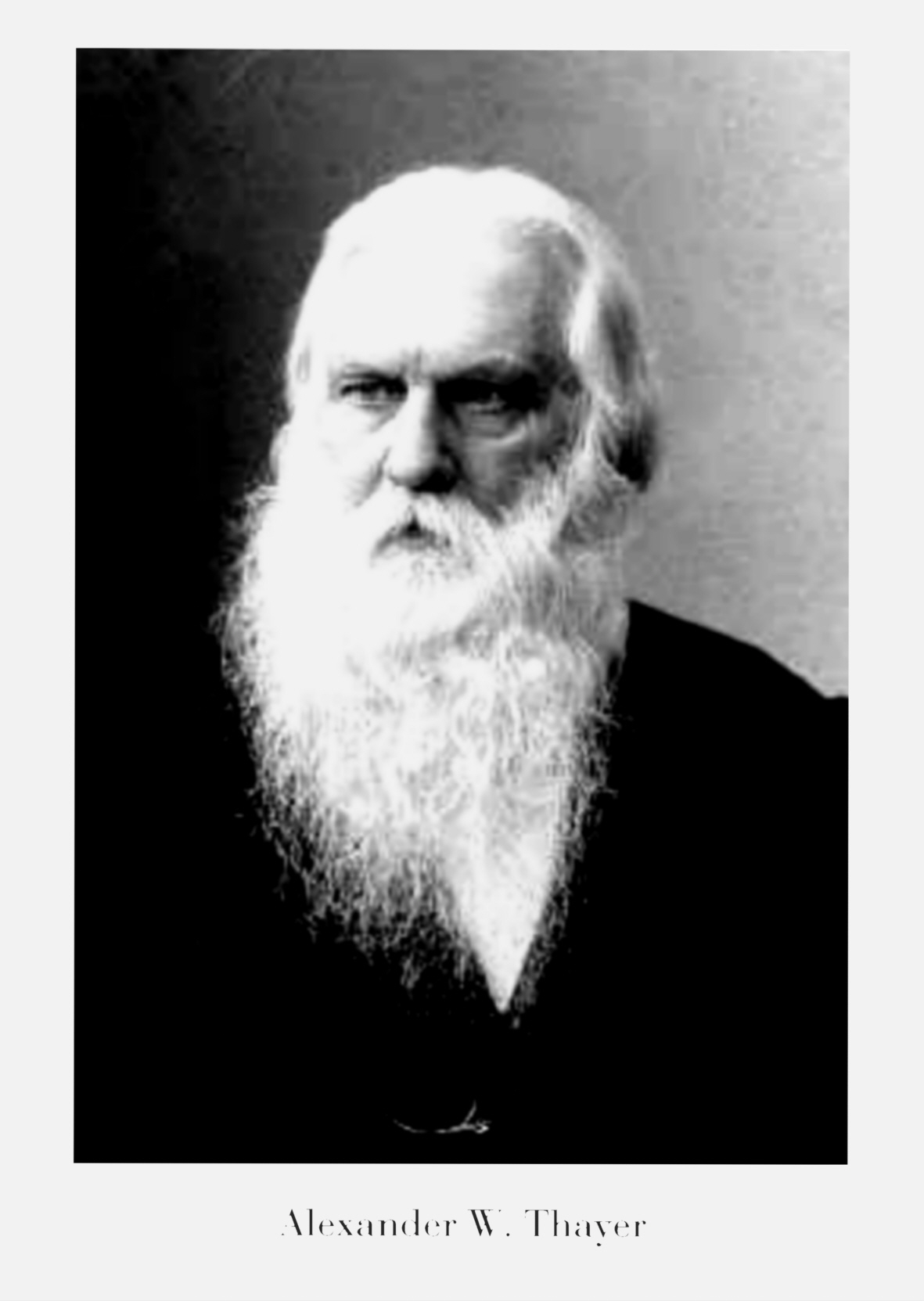
Alexander Wheelock Thayer

Alexander Wheelock Thayer (October 22, 1817 – July 15, 1897) was an American librarian and journalist who became the author of the first scholarly biography of Ludwig van Beethoven. After many updates, it was still regarded as a standard work of reference of the composer.

== Life ==
In the winter of 1838–1839, he was a teacher at the Westfield School in Dedham, Massachusetts. He earned a BA and LLB from Harvard University.

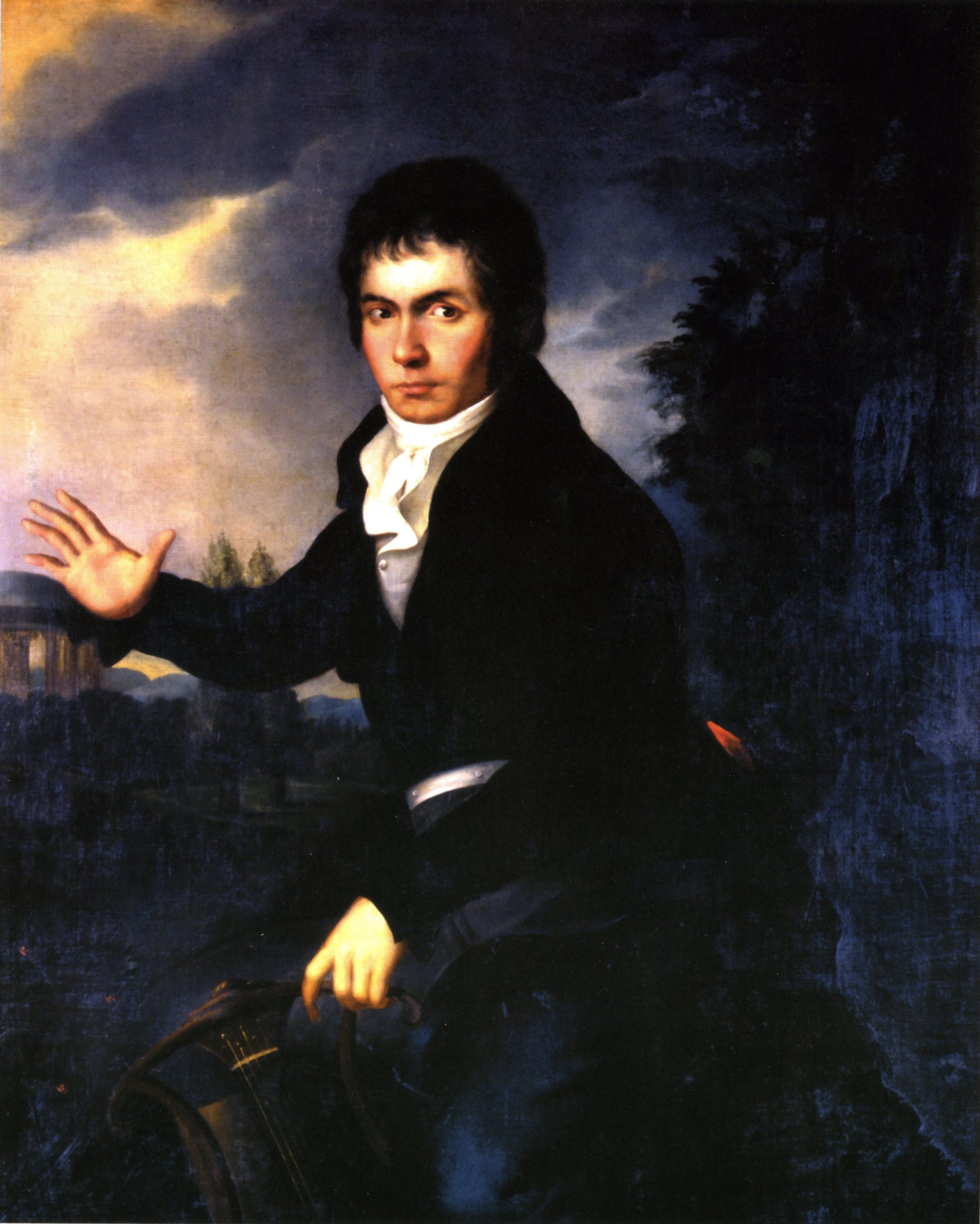
A copy of Joseph Willibrord Mähler's portrait of Beethoven (1804–1805). Once owned by Thayer, it now belongs to the New York Public Library.

Originally a librarian at Harvard Law School, Thayer became aware of many discrepancies in the biography of Beethoven by Anton Schindler, Beethoven's sometime amanuensis, which had first appeared in 1840. (Schindler's reliability has since been extensively discussed by later scholars.) In 1849, Thayer sailed for Europe to undertake his own research, learning German and collecting information. Supporting himself with journalism and after many privations, he was eventually appointed as US Consul in Trieste, where he was able to pursue his labors. The first edition of the biography (in German) in three volumes, covering Beethoven's life to 1816, was published between 1866 and 1879. The work was completed by Thayer's German colleague Hermann Deiters and, after Deiters's death, by Hugo Riemann, who produced volumes 4 (1907) and 5 (1908) from Thayer's notes, covering Beethoven's life from 1817 to his death in 1827.

Thayer's work on Beethoven set a benchmark for modern standards of accuracy, research, and analysis in biography. In 1865, Thayer wrote, "I fight for no theories and cherish no prejudices; my sole point of view is the truth."

Henry Edward Krehbiel, who created the first English edition of the biography in 1921, wrote of Thayer in 1917: "His industry, zeal, keen power of analysis, candor and fair-mindedness won the confidence of all with whom he came into contact except the literary charlatans whose romances he was bent on destroying in the interest of the verities of history."

Krehbiel also penned his own volume four, which was published posthumously in 1925. The most recent version of the biography is revised and edited by Elliot Forbes.

== Bibliography ==
- Thayer, A. W., rev and ed. Elliot Forbes. Thayer's Life of Beethoven. (2 vols.) Princeton: Princeton University Press. ISBN 0-691-09103-X

== See also ==
- Thayer family

== Sources ==
- Thayer's Life of Beethoven, rev. and ed. Elliot Forbes.
- Thayer, Alexander Wheelock in Grove Dictionary of Music and Musicians
- Claman, Henry N.; Bellofatto, Luigi D. (2007). "Vita: Alexander Wheelock Thayer. Brief life of Beethoven's biographer: 1817–1897". Harvard Magazine January–February 2007. Harvard Magazine Inc.
