= Elegischer Gesang =

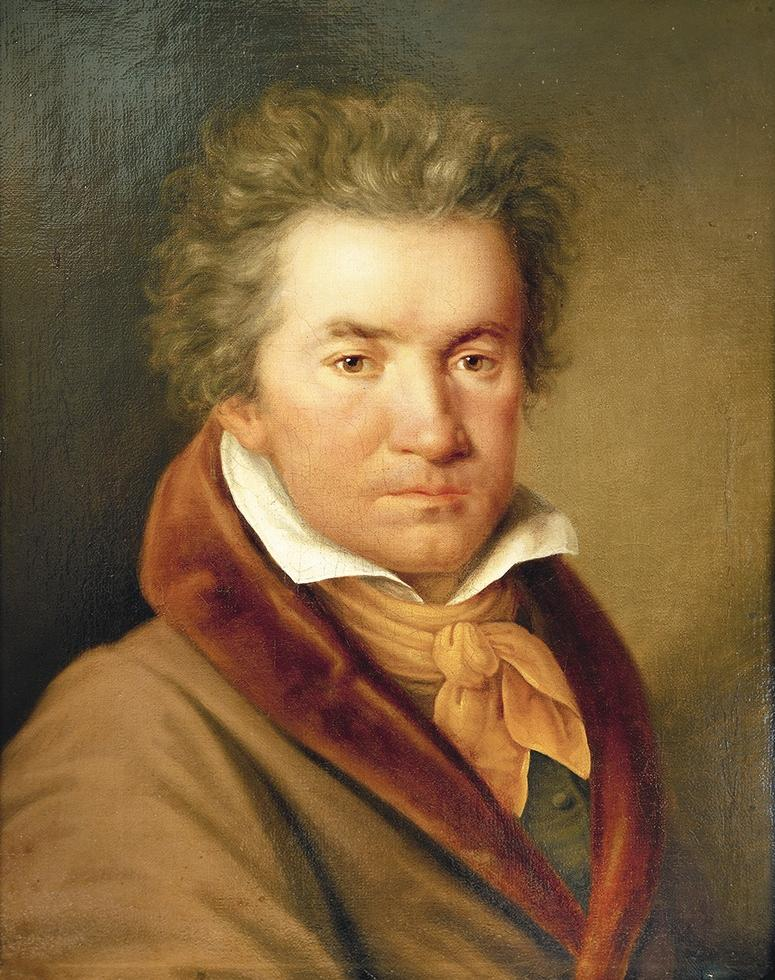
Ludwig van Beethoven depicted in a portrait by Joseph Willibrord Mähler (1815)

"Elegischer Gesang" ("Elegiac Song"), Op. 118, is a short work in E major by Ludwig van Beethoven scored for string quartet and four mixed voices. The text is taken from the poem "Bey der Kunde von Jacobi's Tod" by Johann Christoph Friedrich Haug (1761–1829), written in honor of the death of philosopher and poet Johann Georg Jacobi (1740–1814). Although it was not published until 1826, it dates from 1814 and is dedicated to Beethoven's friend and patron Baron Johann Baptiste Pasqualati von Osterberg (1777–1830), whose wife Eleonore died three years earlier at the age of 24. It is one of Beethoven's least known works and is not often performed or recorded.

== Text ==
The text has been variously identified as anonymous, or attributed to Beethoven’s friend Ignaz Franz Castelli (1781–1862). However, an examination of Haug's poem reveals him as the author. It is a compilation of the first line of stanza three, and half of line three and line four of stanza four.

Sanft, wie du lebtest,
hast du vollendet,
zu heilig für den Schmerz!
Kein Auge wein' ob
des himmlischen Geistes Heimkehr.

Gentle as you lived,
have you completed
too sacred for the pain!
No eye weep for the
Heavenly Spirit's homecoming.

As gentle as you have lived,
have you died,
too holy for sorrow!
Let no eye shed a tear
for the spirit's heavenly homecoming.

Life gently touched thee,
And passed as softly.
Too holy to know pain!
No eye could weep
for this heavenly spirit, when homeward turning.
