= Op. 118 =

In music, Op. 118 stands for Opus number 118. Compositions that are assigned this number include:

- Beethoven – Elegischer Gesang
- Brahms – Six Pieces for Piano
- Fauré – L'horizon chimérique
- Prokofiev – The Tale of the Stone Flower
- Schumann – Drei Sonaten für die Jugend (Three Piano Sonatas for the Young)
- Shostakovich – String Quartet No. 10
