= Pierre Jean Porro =

French guitarist, composer and music publisher

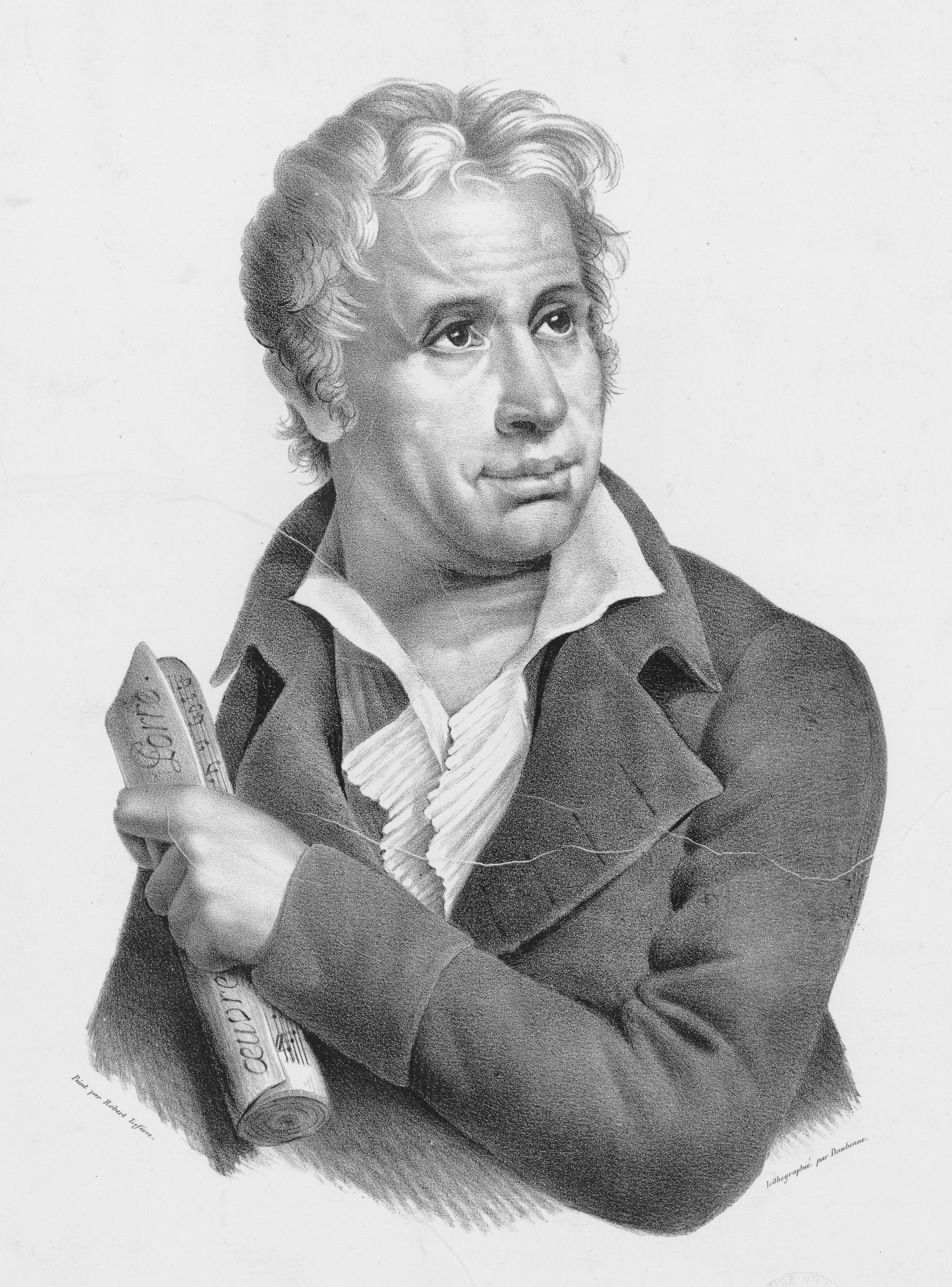
Portrait of Pierre-Jean Porro after Robert Lefèvre

Pierre-Jean Porro (7 December 1750 – 31 May 1831) was an influential French classical guitarist, composer and music publisher.

== Life ==
Porro was born in Bagnols, Provence, France, with the French surname Porre, later italianising his name according to the fashion of the time. He received his early musical training in Béziers before moving to Paris in 1783. There he taught guitar and worked as a music publisher. By 1786, responding to the increased demand for printed music, Porro expanded his publishing house and diversified into musical instrument sales. He was also an editor and publisher of various journals such as the weekly Le Journal de Guitare (1787–1803) in which he published his own compositions as well as French editions of the works of Italian composers such as Francesco Durante, Jommelli, Giovanni Battista Pergolesi in addition to those of the composers of his time such as Mozart and Haydn.

In all, he published 37 works for the 5- and 6-string guitars and the lyre-guitar (popular in the French salons in the late 18th century). Porro also wrote a guitar method (Methode de guitare à six cordes op. 31) which included material for the lyre-guitar.

Porro died on 31 May 1831 in Montmorency, Val-d'Oise, near Paris.

== Legacy ==
Porro lived and worked in Paris at a time (late 18th and early 19th century) when the guitar reached a peak of popularity and the city attracted many other notable guitarists such as Filippo Gragnani, Fernando Sor, Mauro Giuliani, Dionisio Aguado and Ferdinando Carulli. His influence helped popularize the guitar as a salon instrument. Also a guitar teacher, he published a guitar method and was an editor and publisher of several musical journals. His life coincided with the evolution of the guitar from the five-course baroque guitar to its modern six string classical form. He published works for both types of guitar and also composed works for the lyre-guitar which was popular in France in the late 18th century.

== Selected compositions ==
- Nouvelles étrennes de guitarre ou recueil des plus jolies romances et couplets qui aient paru dans l'année 1784, suivis d'une sonate et de plusieurs pièces pour la guitarre seule op. 4 (1785)
- Collection de préludes et caprices dans tous les tons pour l'étude de la guitare (1789)
- A l'Amitié for voice and guitar (c.1790)
- Sonate ou duo op. 11, with violin part
- Exercices mélés d'airs connus, et autres, Pour l'Etude de la Guitare op. 24 (c.1810)
- Six Romances nouvelles op. 34 for voice, flute or violin, guitar (c.1803). Contains: 1. Le Saule du malheureux; 2. La Sérénade; 3. L'Amour marchand de co; 4. Chant d'une jeune arabe; 5. Canzonetta; 6. L'Adieu.
- Instruction élémentaire de la lyre-guitare (c.1810); reprint, Florence: Studio per edizioni scelte (1982)
- Vive Henri quatre. Avec dix variations pour la guitare ou la lyre (c.1815)

== Recordings ==
- Pierre-Jean Porro: Romances, airs, sonate, performed by Ensemble Adelaïde, Bruno Marlat (cond.), on: Solstice SOCD 162 (CD, 1998). Contains the sonata op. 11 (flute, guitar), three of the Six Romances nouvelles op. 34, five songs from op. 37, and other songs with flute or violin and guitar.
