= Lyre-guitar =

Guitar shaped to look like a lyre

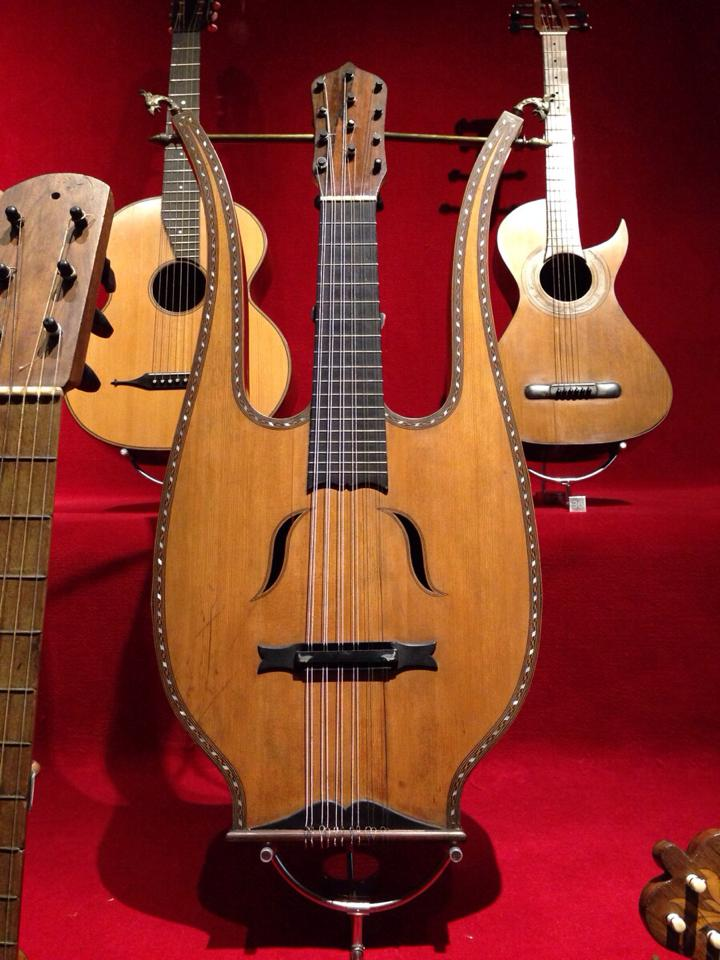
A six-course double-strung 12 string lyre-guitar at the Museu de la Música de Barcelona.

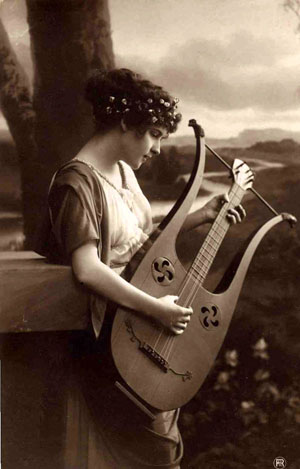
A postcard showing a girl playing a lyre-guitar, c. 1870. The classical theme is typical of the period.

A musical instrument of the chordophone family, the lyre-guitar was a type of guitar shaped to look like a lyre, popular as a fad-instrument in the early 1800s. It had six single courses, with a fretboard located between two curved arms recalling the shape of the ancient Greek kithara. It was tuned and played like the conventional guitar.

The lyre-guitar nearly always had a built-in pedestal allowing it to stand upright when not in use.

== History ==
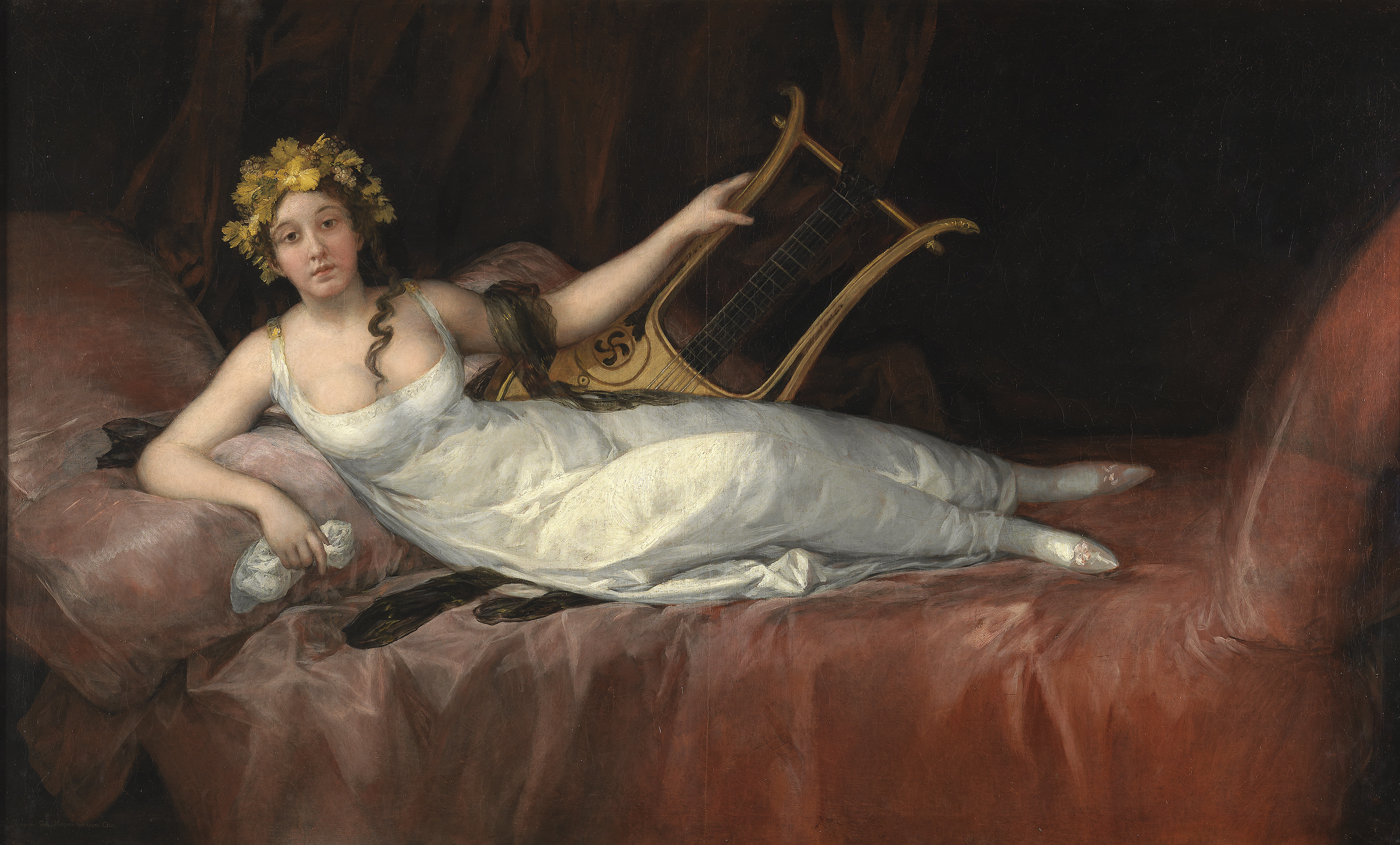
A lyre-guitar depicted here in a painting by Francisco de Goya, c. 1805. Its popularity at the time was encouraged by the revival of classicism.

Pierre Charles Mareschal claimed to have invented it in 1780, what he called the Lira Anacreòntica. Mareschal was a prominent French luthier, and accused the French musician Phillis Pleyel of stealing his design.

The lyre-guitar enjoyed great popularity as a salon instrument, especially in Paris between 1780 and 1820. It became very much in vogue and pervaded the highest levels of society; Marie Antoinette played one and the great guitarists of the day such as Ferdinando Carulli, Fernando Sor, Matteo Carcassi, Mauro Giuliani, and Pierre Jean Porro wrote music and method books for it.

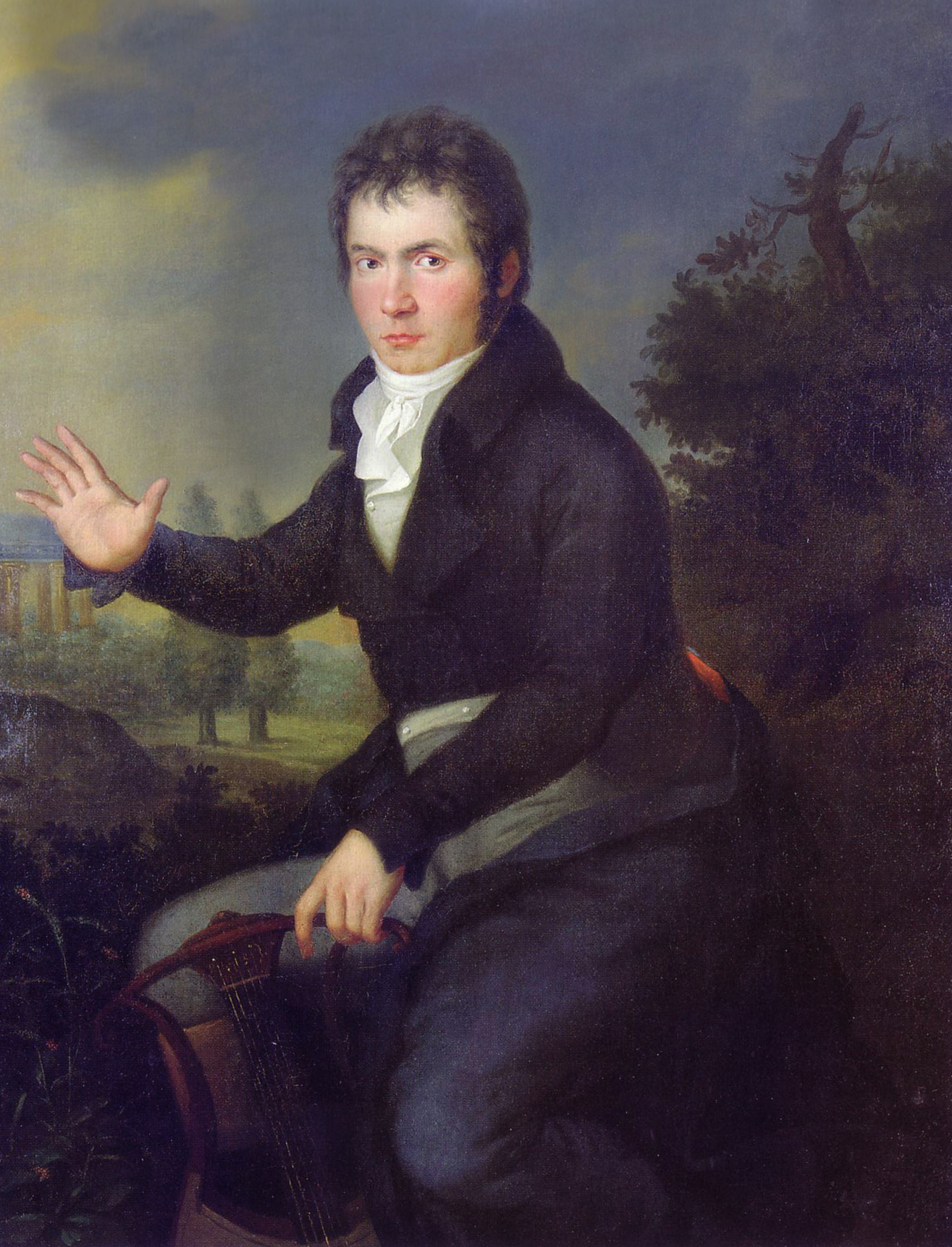
Ludwig van Beethoven holding a lyre-guitar in his hand - painting by Joseph Willibrord Mähler 1804–1805

Its decline coincided with the waning of the popularity of the guitar as a salon instrument, increasingly supplanted by the piano which benefited from ongoing improvements to its keyboard action.

The lyre-guitar persisted, but not so much as a musical instrument, instead it persisted as a common symbol of classicist ideals, and appeared in numerous allegorical paintings (e.g. Mähler's portrait of Beethoven). Later on it was used in photographs as a prop for evoking ancient Greek and Roman themes.

The idea was to create an instrument which looked pretty and provided a visual accessory to help ladies of fashion to assume the gracious pose of Greek kithara players. This visual likeness became a potent ingredient of the culture of the upper classes.

Although the lyre-guitar is rarely heard or recorded it is not extinct. A body of nearly forgotten repertoire exists often by highly notable guitarists of the golden age of the guitar. Today lyre-guitars can be made to order by luthiers and authentic examples exist in museums and private collections.

== Lyre-guitar luthiers ==
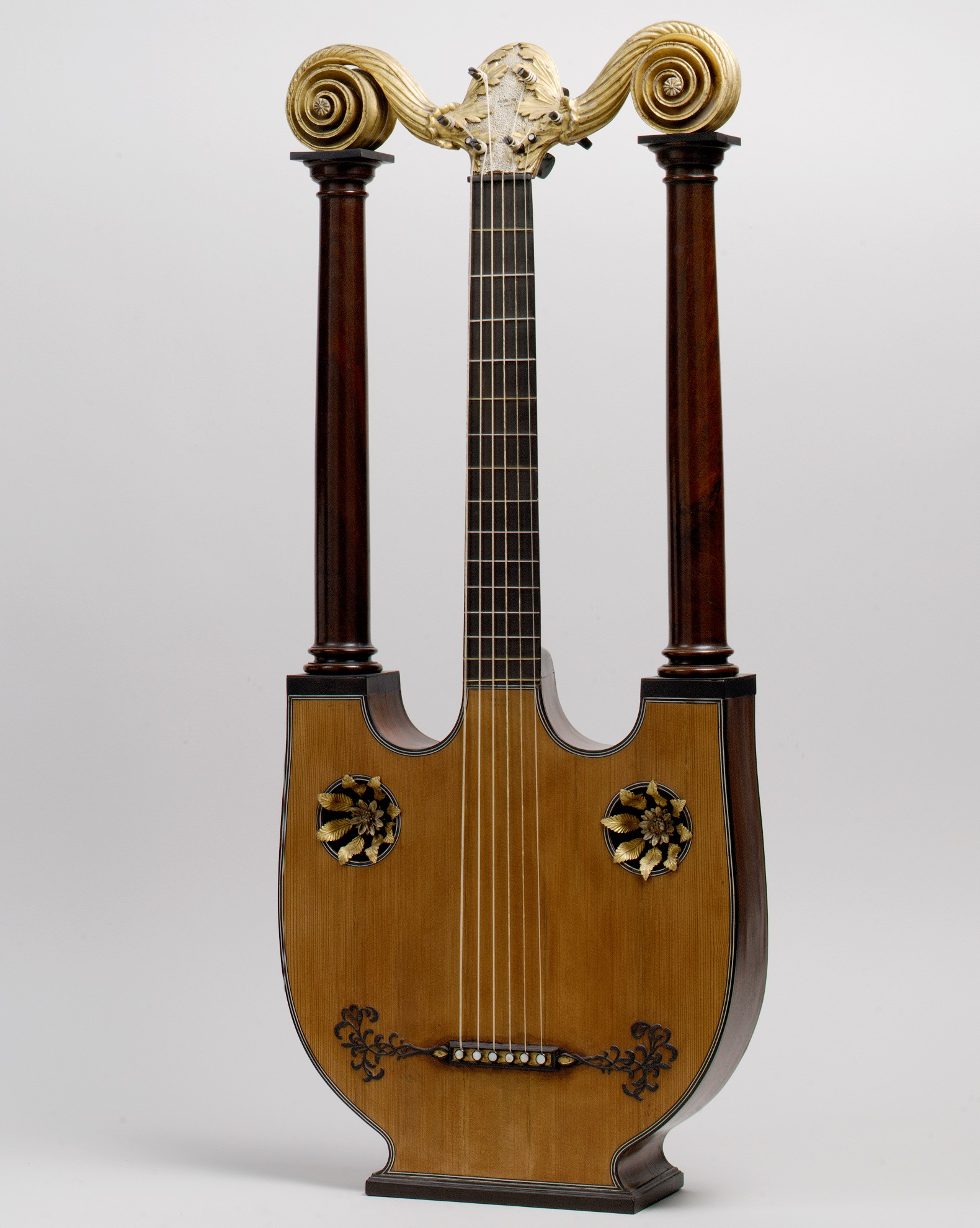
- Chordophone-Lute-plucked-fretted Lyre guitar, held at the Metropolitan Museum of Art
  Robert Wornum (1780–1852)
- César Pons (1748–1831)
- Francois Roudhloff (Mauchand, France)

== Bibliography ==
- Vulpiani, Eleonora. Lyre-guitar. Étoile charmante, between the 18th and 19th century. Archived from the original on 2010-04-04.
- Matanya, Ophee (Winter 1987–1988). "The story of the lyre-guitar". Soundboard. Vol. XIV, no. 4.
- The New Grove Dictionary of Music and Musicians. 1980. ISBN 0-333-23111-2.
- Bonner, Stephen (1972). The classic image: European history and manufacture of the lyre guitar, 850–1840. Bois de Boulogne: Harlow. ISBN 0-900998-09-1.
