= Ferdinand Luib =

Austrian music critic and biographer (1811–1877)

Ferdinand Johann Nepomuk Moritz Luib (28 January 1811 - 30 April 1877) was an Austrian music critic and biographer of Franz Schubert.

Luib was born in Vienna and served there as a public official. He became an editor of the Allgemeine Wiener Musik-Zeitung in 1847 until its demise the following year. He also wrote for Theaterzeitung and the Wanderer. He directed Polyhymnia, a singing society. Luib is best known for his early biography of Franz Schubert and his promotion of the Unfinished symphony. In his researches, Luib corresponded with many friends of Schubert including Schubert's close friend Anselm Hüttenbrenner. His letters and biographical researches from the 1850s form an important source of information about the composer. Other correspondents include Eduard von Bauernfeld, poet Josef Kenner, composer Joseph Lanz, and Leopold von Sonnleithner.
