= Pasqualati House =

Historic house in Austria

Coordinates: 48°12′44.6″N 16°21′44.1″E

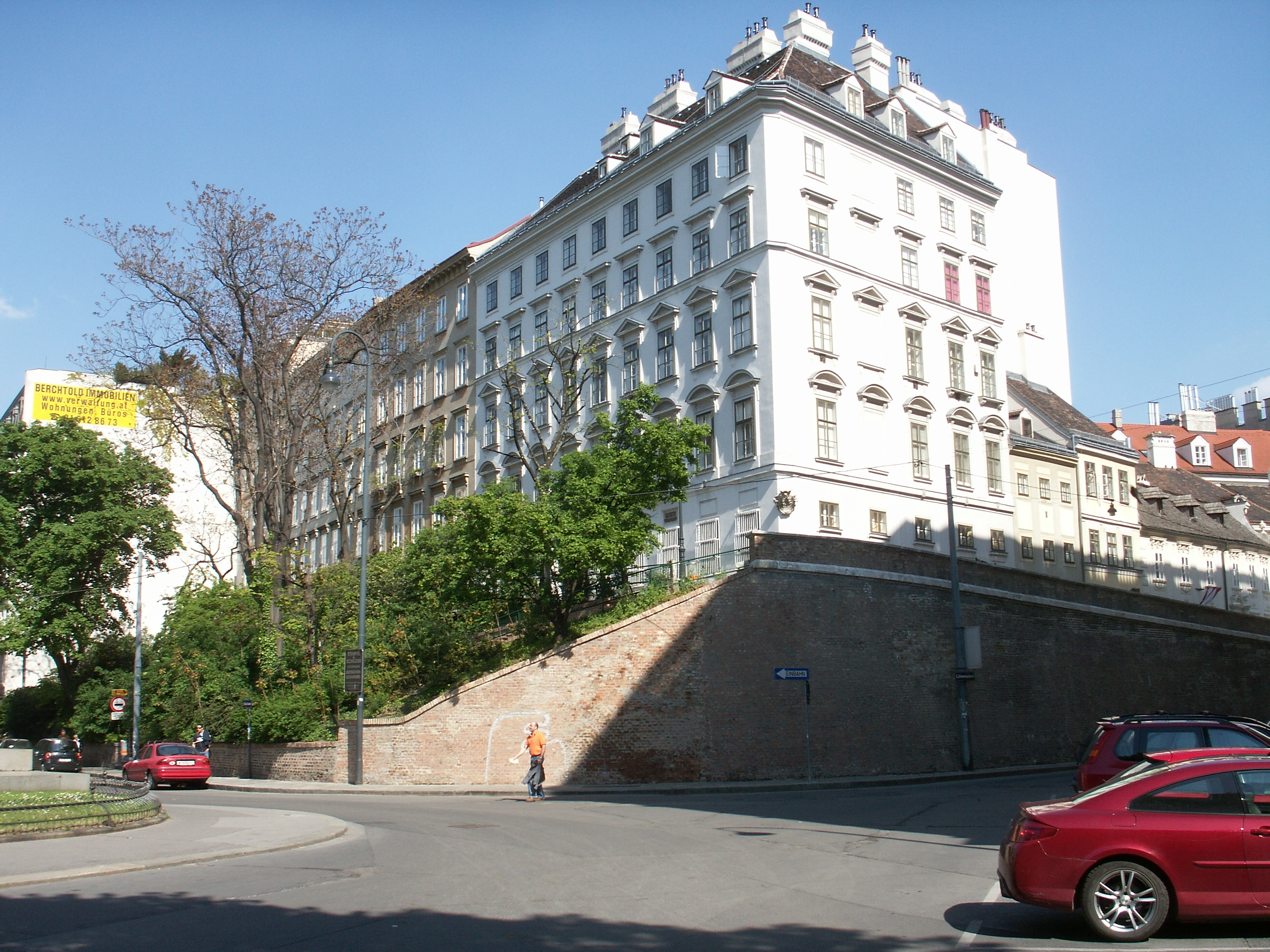
The Pasqualati House in central Vienna, seen from the southeast

The Pasqualati House, notable for being a residence of Ludwig van Beethoven, is located in the 1st district of Vienna's Inner City, on the corner of Mölker Bastei 8 and Schreyvogelgasse 16, in an exposed position on the ramp of the former town fortifications. The building, completed in 1797 and home to the composer on several occasions, houses a Beethoven museum in an apartment adjoining the one Beethoven regularly occupied.

== History ==
The house was built in 1797 by Peter Mollner for Empress Maria Theresa's personal physician, Joseph Benedikt, Baron Pasqualati von Osterberg (1733-1799), by joining two smaller residences and augmenting these to produce the present stately apartment block. One of the older buildings housed a stonemason's workshop, while the other numbered among its tenants Count Leander Anguissola, imperial chief engineer, and Johann Jakob Marinoni, a court mathematician, who together published a plan of Vienna while holding teaching posts at the Military Engineering Academy, under whose auspices they gave lectures in the house. In 1770 the composers Florian Gassmann and his student Antonio Salieri lived in one of these smaller residences, known then as the “Schmidisches Haus.”

Joseph Benedikt's son, Johann Baptiste, Baron Pasqualati von Osterberg (1777-1830) inherited the house, together with his three siblings, on his father's death. He became a patron of Beethoven, whom he allowed to live in his house for a total of eight years. Between 1804 and 1815, Beethoven twice took up residence in the present building (1804–08 and 1810–14), with some of his most important works, including the Fifth and Sixth Symphonies, Für Elise, the Archduke Trio and his only opera, Fidelio, being composed at the Pasqualati House. Bettina Brentano visited Beethoven there during his second stay and described the meeting in her book Goethes Briefwechsel mit einem Kinde. Between 1991 and c. 2000, the musicological series Vom Pasqualati Haus was published from the building. From 1947, the Adalbert Stifter Museum was located in three rooms of the Pasqualati House.

" ...(Pasqualati House) owned up to its tainted past, noting that the Nazis had evicted the Jewish family that lived there to create the museum, and some were killed in Auschwitz."

== Architecture ==
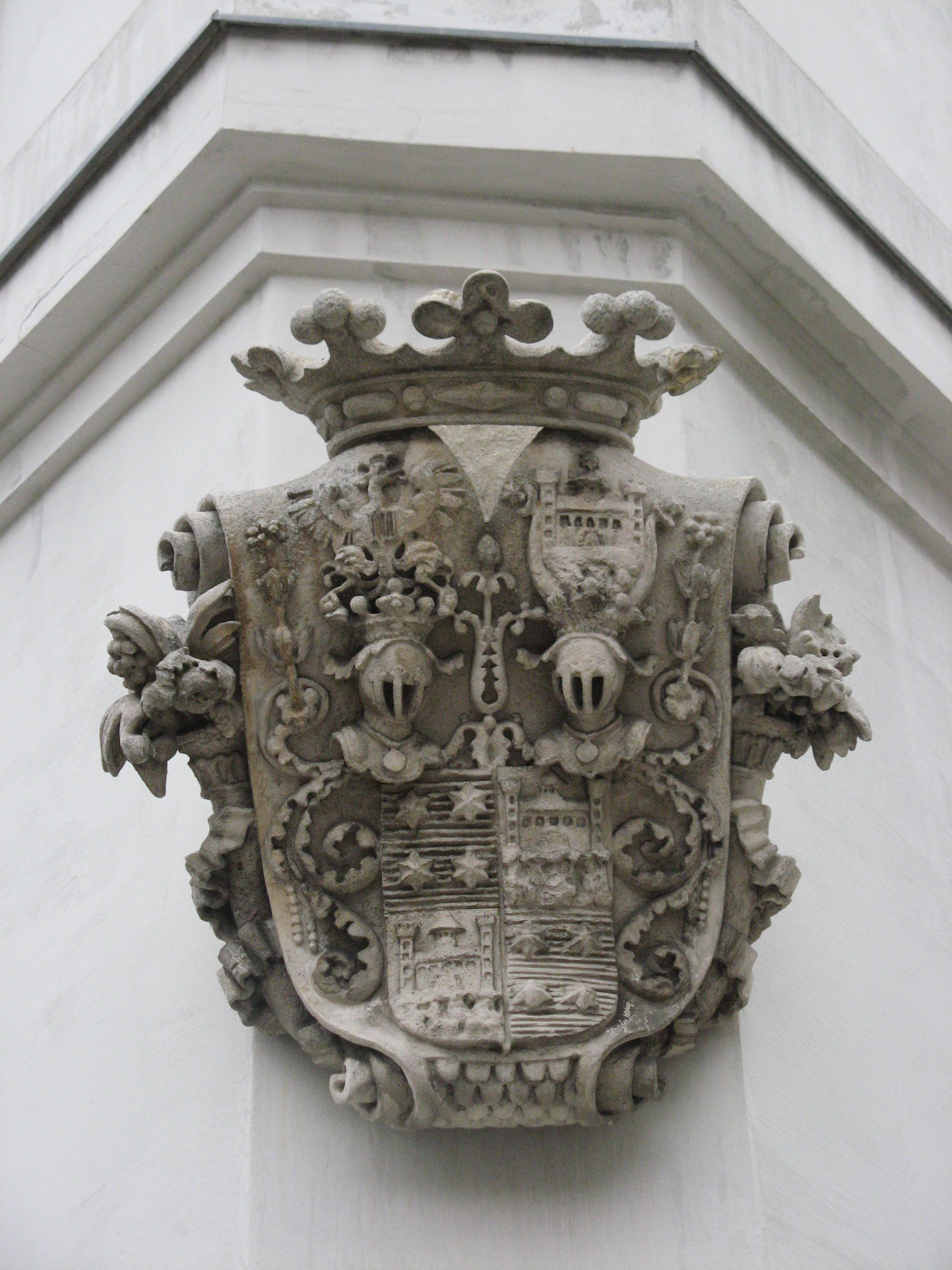
The Pasqualati coat of arms

The building is a block corner house in the classicist style. At the corner is the Pasqualati coat of arms. The rectangular portal with builder's inscription leads into a driveway and a courtyard with wrought iron lantern and fountain. The spiral staircase, made from Kaisersteinbruch stone, still has its original wrought-iron railings and lattice doors. Roof truss and cellar vault also date from the period of original construction. In the basement are to be found remains of the city fortifications. A plaque commemorates Ludwig van Beethoven.

== Beethoven memorial ==
An apartment on the 4th floor hosts a memorial designed in 1997 by Elsa Prochazka. On display are the portrait of Beethoven by Joseph Willibrord Mähler from 1804/05 and the 1814 portrait of Count Andrey Razumovsky by Johann Baptist von Lampi the Elder. Items from Beethoven's possessions, several facsimiles and illustrations from the life and work of the composer, as well as two audio stations with Beethoven's music complete the exhibit. Since Beethoven's actual flat in the north section of the fourth floor has a tenant, the next-door flat is on show as the Beethoven museum. The Pasqualati House memorial belongs to the Vienna Museum.
