= Gerhard von Breuning =

Austrian physician

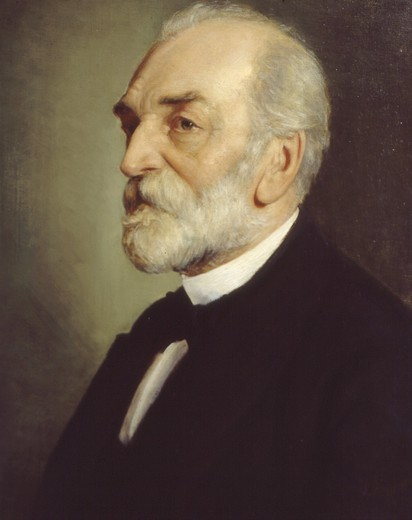
Gerhard von Breuning

Moritz Gerhard von Breuning (28 August 1813 – 6 May 1892) was an Austrian physician, known for his documentation and friendship of Ludwig van Beethoven during the composer's last years.

== Life ==
Breuning was born in Vienna in 1813; his parents were Stephan von Breuning and Marie Constanze Ruschowitz, whom he married in 1817. Stephan von Breuning came to Vienna from Bonn about 1800; he was a member of the Austrian Hofkriegsrat, and in 1818 became Hofrat.

Gerhard von Breuning is known particularly for his friendship in his youth with composer Ludwig van Beethoven. Gerhard's father, Stephan Von Breuning and Beethoven had known each other since when they were boys in Bonn. The young Beethoven became a close friend to the entire Breuning family and gave piano lessons to Stephan's younger siblings. Beethoven and Stephan were also both violin pupils of Franz Anton Ries, and their friendship continued in Vienna. Gerhard lived during his childhood in the Rotherhaus, near Beethoven's last home, an apartment in the Schwarzspanierhaus; during the final nearly two years of Beethoven's life, Gerhard, then in his early teens, paid frequent visits to the composer and often accompanied him on his walks. Beethoven was quite fond of young Gerhard and enjoyed his company. He liked to call him Ariel (referring to the character in Shakespeare's The Tempest), and, since Gerhard was known to be dependent upon his father, also called him "Hosenknopf" (trouser button).

Breuning later became an eminent physician in Vienna and was also for many years an active committee member of the Gesellschaft der Musikfreunde. In 1870, he published Aus dem Schwarzspanierhause: Erinnerungen an Ludwig van Beethoven aus meiner Jugendzeit, in which he described his memories of Beethoven; it is an important biographical source about the composer's last years. Gerhard Von Breuning died in Vienna in 1892 at the age of 78.
