= Joseph Willibrord Mähler =

German painter (1778–1860)

- Born: 10 June 1778
- Died: 20 June 1860 (aged 82)
- Known for: Painting
- Style: Portraits

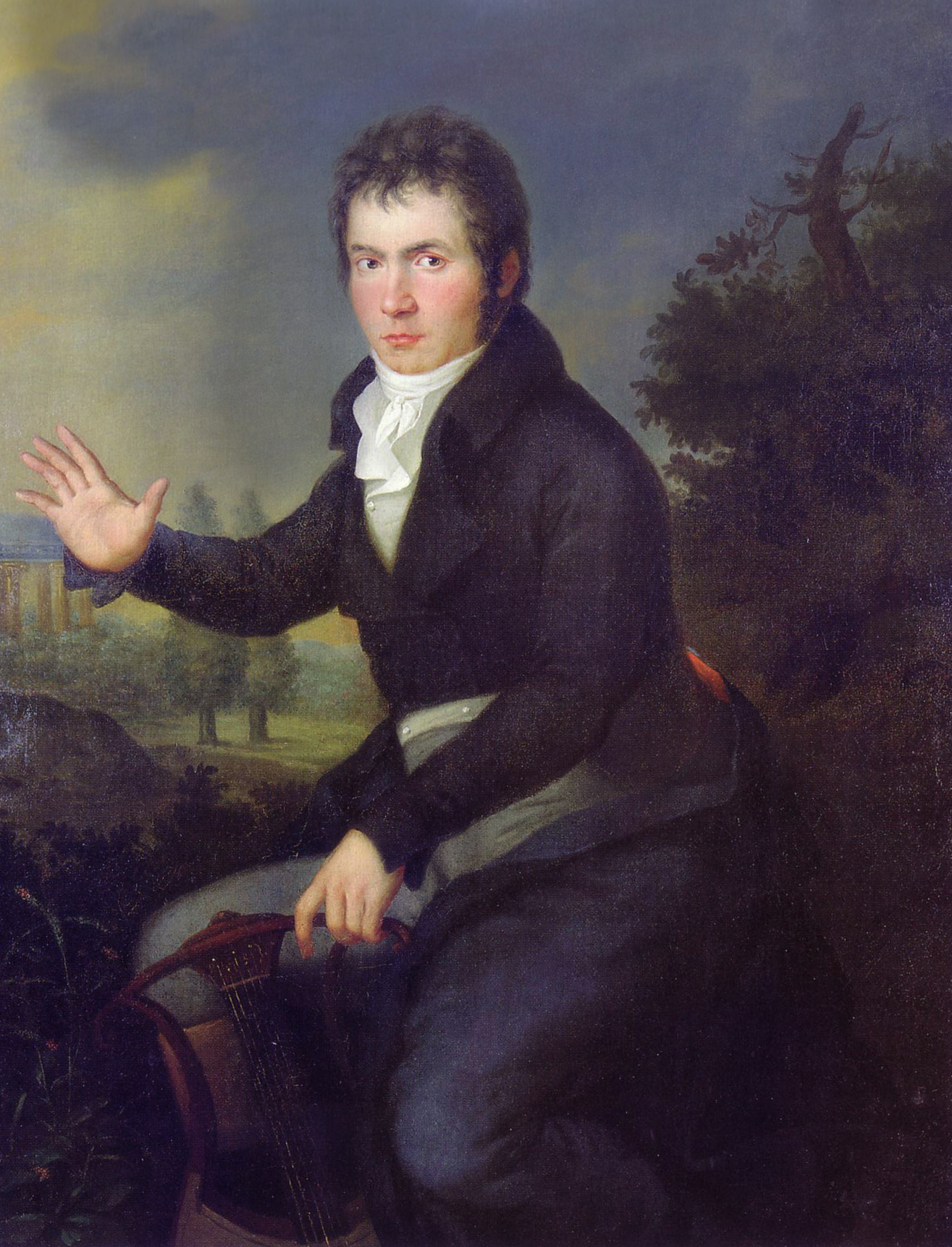
Ludwig van Beethoven, 1804/05

Joseph Willibrord Mähler (10 June 1778 – 20 June 1860) was a German painter. He was born in Koblenz-Ehrenbreitstein, the son of Franz Josef Mähler and Anna Johanna, née Vacano. He first served an apprenticeship in Dresden with Anton Graff to become a painter and later on, he continued with his studies at the Academy of Fine Arts Vienna. Mähler then decided to start a civil career, and he became an officer of the Secret Service Geheime Kabinettskanzlei (secret chancellery) in Vienna, while painting in his spare time.

Mähler was introduced to Ludwig van Beethoven by Beethoven's school day friend Stephan von Breuning in the winter 1803/04. He painted his first portrait of Beethoven, which shows three quarters of the composer's body in an Arcadian landscape, holding a lyre-guitar in his hand. (Today, the painting is located in the Beethoven Memorial, the Pasqualati House in Vienna). In the 19th century, this illustration – one of just a few depictions of Beethoven when he was young – mainly became famous due to a lithograph by Josef Kriehuber.

Around 1815, Mähler produced a series of portraits showing contemporary Viennese composers. As written in the Allgemeine Musikzeitung (General music journal) in August 1815, "all of them distinguish themselves in a most creditable way through the effectual brush stroke, the descriptive resemblance and the distinctive expression of their soul". A half-length portrait of Beethoven was part of the series. The painter created several versions of this portrait. He died, aged 82, in Vienna.

== Gallery ==
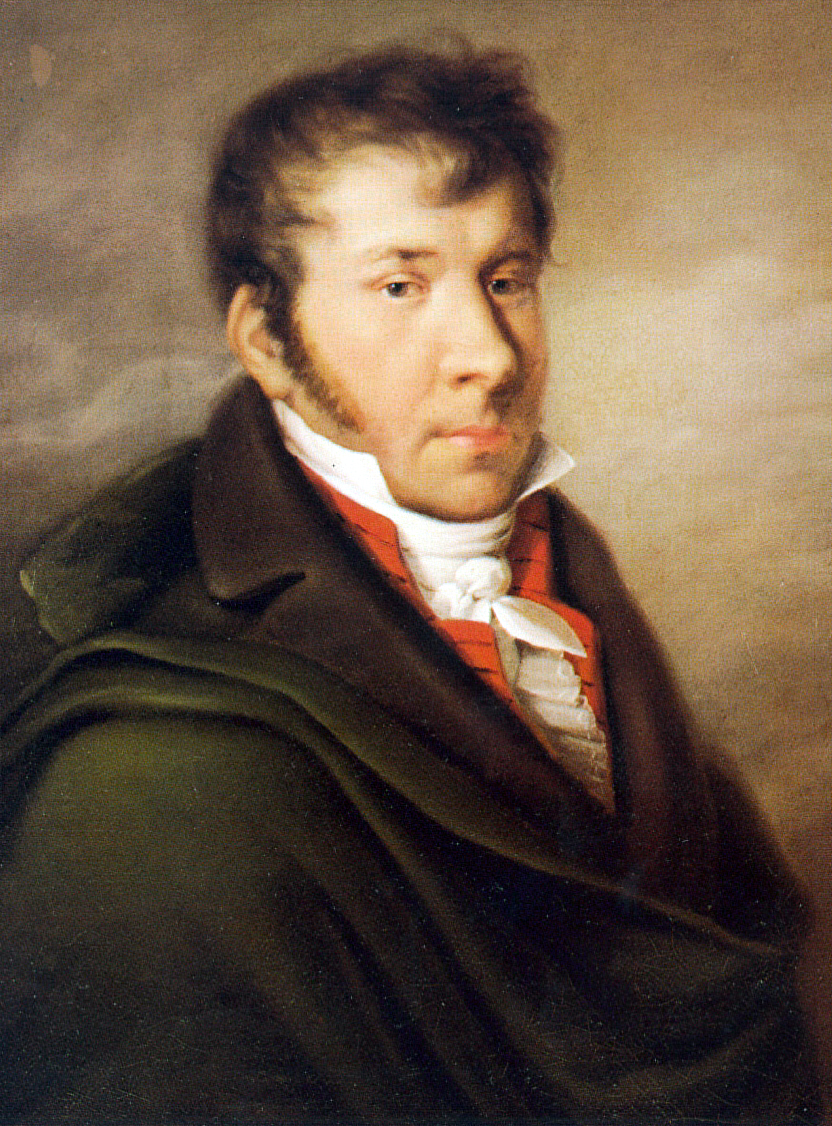
Johann Nepomuk Hummel, c. 1814

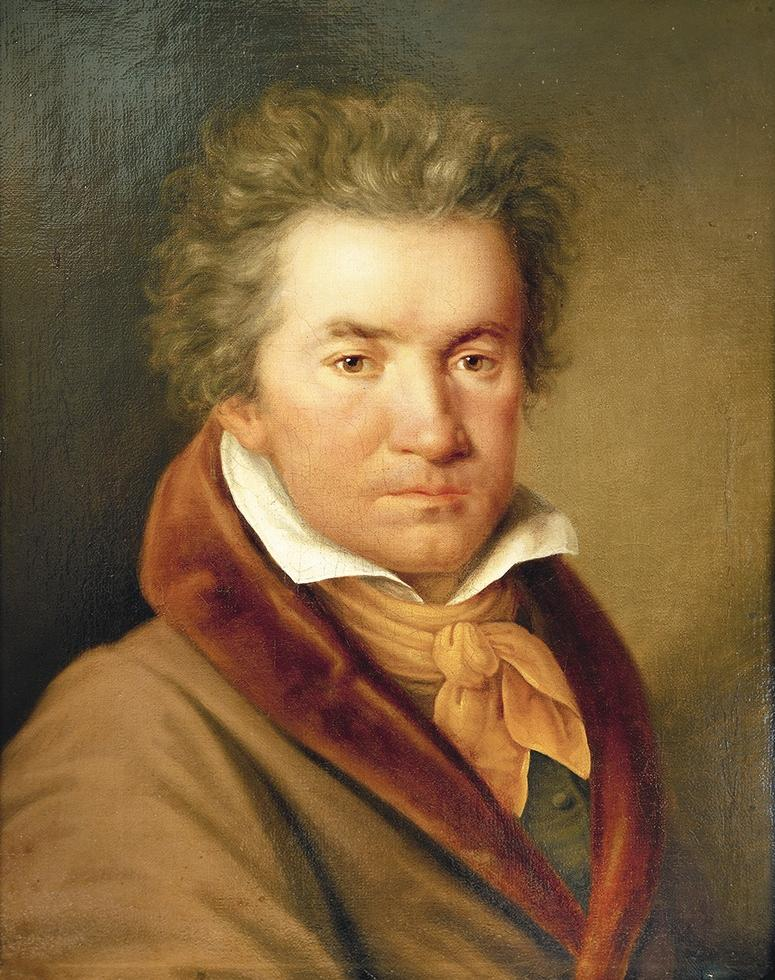
Ludwig van Beethoven, c. 1815

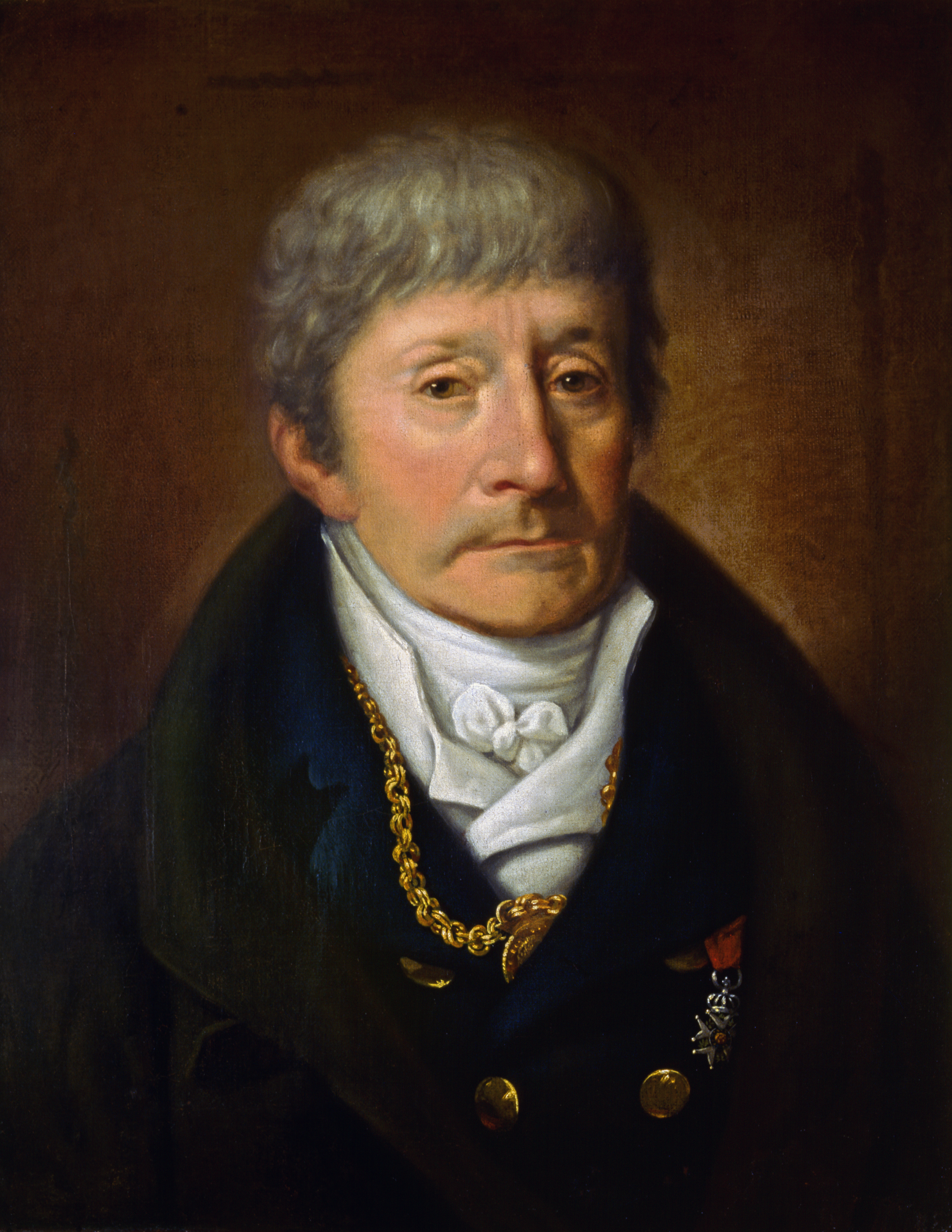
Antonio Salieri, c. 1815
