= Stephan von Breuning (librettist) =

German civil servant and librettist

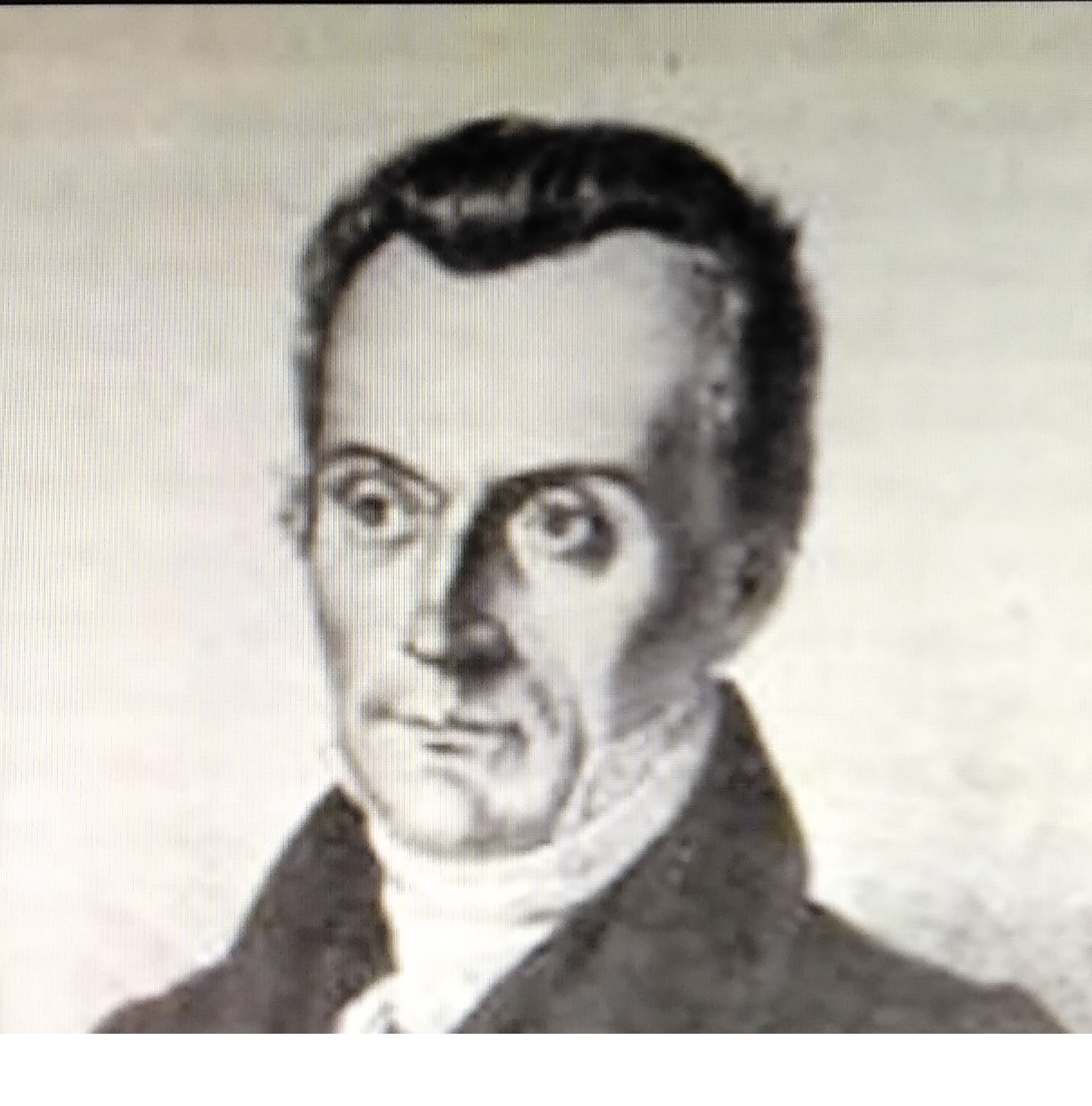
- Born: 17 August 1774; Bonn
- Died: 4 June 1827 (aged 52)
- Occupation(s): Civil servant, librettist
- Spouse: Julie von Vering (m. 1808; died 1809) Constanze Ruschowitz (m. 1817)
- Children: 3, including Gerhard von Breuning

Stephan von Breuning (17 August 1774 – 4 June 1827) was a German civil servant, librettist and Ludwig van Beethoven's lifelong friend, from his childhood in Bonn when receiving music lessons until acting as his executor in Vienna.

== Life ==
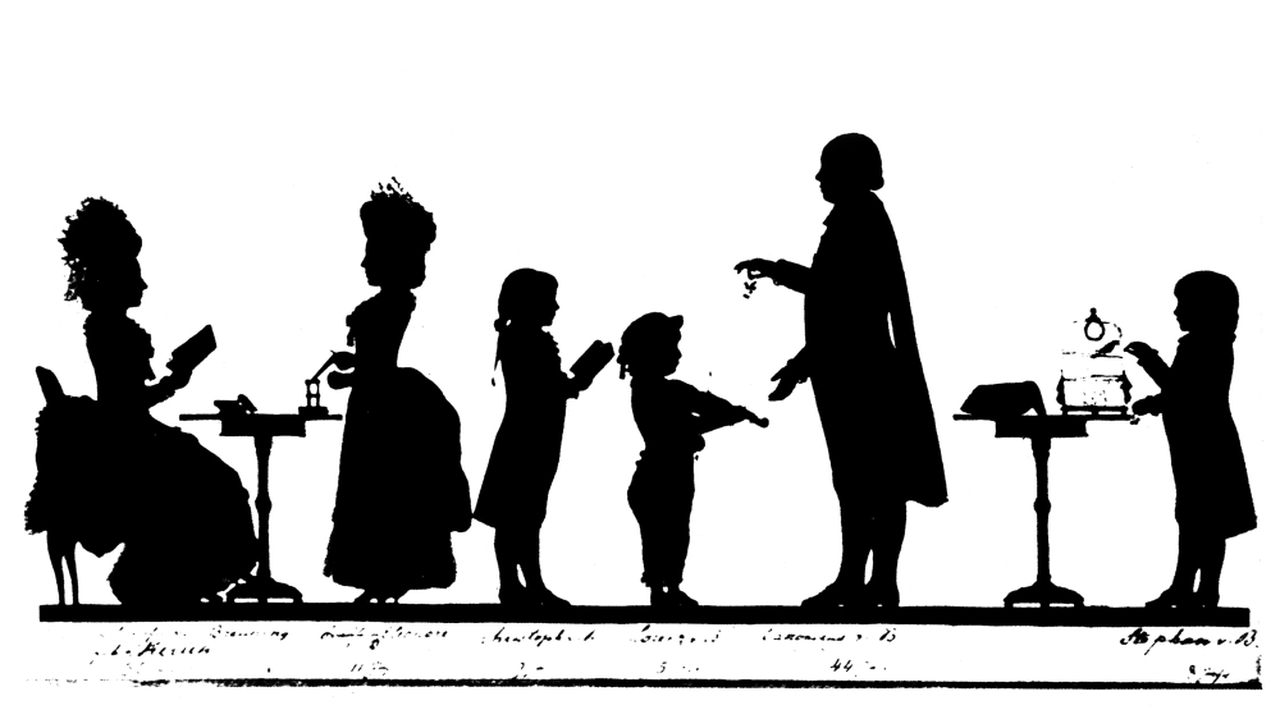
Helene von Breuning with her children: Eleonore (Beethoven's first love), Christoph, Lorenz, (Helene's brother Abraham) and Stephan (far right).

Born in Bonn, Breuning was the son of Emanuel Joseph von Breuning and his wife Helene von Breuning, also known as Beethoven's second mother. In 1784, the family made the acquaintance of Ludwig van Beethoven in their home at Bonn. He became a close friend to the family and gave piano lessons to the Breuning children Eleonore and Lorenz.

In 1801, Breuning moved to Vienna where four years later Beethoven's Fidelio was premiered. Besides Joseph Sonnleithner and Georg Friedrich Treitschke, Breuning also contributed to the libretto. In 1806, Beethoven dedicated his violin concerto op. 61 to his friend. Following Beethoven's death in 1827, Breuning assisted in handling affairs of the estate, then died at age 52 a few months later. The plan to publish a Beethoven biography, which Breuning had considered writing in collaboration with Beethoven's childhood friend and Breuning's brother-in-law Franz Gerhard Wegeler and Anton Schindler, could not be realized.

== Family ==
In April, 1808, Breuning married Julie von Vering (1791–1809), the daughter of Beethoven's physician Gerhard von Vering (1755-1823), to whom Beethoven dedicated the piano version of his Violin Concerto. Julie died at age 17, less than a year after their marriage. Around 1812, Breuning began a relationship with Constanze Ruschowitz (1785-86 in Freudenthal, Austrian Silesia, – 5 October 1856 in Vienna), whom he married on 18 February 1817. She had three children:

- Gerhard von Breuning,
- Helena Juliana Philippina von Breuning (born 17 August 1818),
- Mara Magdalena Barbara von Breuning (born 2 April 1821).
