= Sieghard Brandenburg =

German musicologist (1938–2015)

Sieghard Brandenburg (21 January 1938 – 18 December 2015) was a German musicologist, who stood out especially as a Beethoven researcher.

== Life ==
Born in Bad Frankenhausen, Brandenburg studied music (main subject oboe), musicology and mathematics at the Hochschule für Musik Freiburg and at the Albert-Ludwigs-Universität Freiburg, later musicology, mathematics and modern history at the University of Bonn. In 1968 he became a research assistant at the Beethoven Archive Bonn and in 1984 director of the Beethoven Archive. One of his most important projects was the publication of Ludwig van Beethoven's correspondence, which appeared in seven volumes from 1996 to 1998.

In 2000, at the suggestion of Rainer Cadenbach, the Berlin University of the Arts - now the Universität der Künste Berlin - awarded him an honorary doctorate.

After his retirement he moved to the small village of Galmsbüll in North Frisia, where he died in 2015 at age 77.

== Writings ==
=== Books and independent publications ===
- Die Beethoven-Autographen der Sammlung Prof. Dr. Walter Henn Braunschweig, beschrieben und kommentiert von Martin Staehelin, unter Mitarbeit von Sieghard Brandenburg, Bonn 1983
- Ein Brief von Beethovens Großneffen Louis von Hoven an seine Schwester Marie Weidinger in Wien aus dem Jahre 1875, Bonn 1984
- Ludwig van Beethoven, Der Briefwechsel mit dem Verlag Schott, ed. by Sieghard Brandenburg, Munich 1985
- Der Freundeskreis der Familie Malfatti, Bonn 1985
- Ludwig van Beethoven, Der Brief an die Unsterbliche Geliebte, ed. by Sieghard Brandenburg, Bonn 1986 (Facsimile-Ausgabe)
- Beethovens Tagebuch, ed. by Maynard Solomon, new edition by Sieghard Brandenburg, Mainz 1990
- Ludwig van Beethoven, Ein Brief an Franz Anton Hoffmeister in Leipzig, ed. by Sieghard Brandenburg, Bonn 1992 (Faccsimile-Ausgabe)
- Ludwig van Beethoven, Briefwechsel. Gesamtausgabe, ed. by Sieghard Brandenburg, 7 volumes, Munich 1996–1998
- Ludwig van Beethoven, Ein Brief an Karl Friedrich Müller in Berlin, ed. by Sieghard Brandenburg, Bonn 1992, Facsimile-Ausgabe
- Ludwig van Beethoven, Zwei Blätter aus seinem Tagebuch, ed. by Sieghard Brandenburg, Bonn 1992, Facsimile-Ausgabe
- Ein Brief Anton Schindlers an Gerhard von Breuning. Aus der Anfangszeit der Beethoven-Biographik, ed. by Sieghard Brandenburg, Bonn 1993
- Ludwig van Beethoven, Punktierstich von Blasius Höfel after Louis Letronne, Vienna 1814, ed. by Sieghard Brandenburg, Bonn 1994
- Beethovens Briefe. Editionen aus zwei Jahrhunderten. Eine Ausstellung des Beethoven-Hauses Bonn, ed. by Sieghard Brandenburg, Bonn 1996
- Ludwig van Beethoven, Ein Brief an Franz Gerhard Wegeler in Bonn, ed. by Sieghard Brandenburg, Bonn 1997
- Ludwig van Beethoven, Heiligenstadt Testament, ed. by Sieghard Brandenburg, Bonn 1997, Facsimile-Ausgabe
- Ludwig van Beethoven, „… mit Hochachtung ihr Freund Beethoven“. Ein Brief an die Sängerin Anna Milder-Hauptmann, ed. by Sieghard Brandenburg, Bonn 2002

=== Essays ===
- Beethovens „erste Entwürfe“ zu Variationenzyklen, in Bericht über den internationalen musikwissenschaftlichen Kongress Bonn 1970, ed. by Carl Dahlhaus, Hans Joachim Marx, Magda Marx-Weber and Günther Massenkeil, Kassel 1971, pp. 108–111
- Beethovens Skizzen zum zweiten Satz der 7. Symphonie op. 92, idem, pp. 355–357
- Die kurfürstliche Musikbibliothek in Bonn und ihre Bestände im 18. Jahrhundert, in Beethoven-Jahrbuch, Jg. 8 (1975), pp. 7–47
- Die Gründungsjahre des Verlags N. Simrock in Bonn. Kurzfassung einer geplanten Monographie, in Bonner Geschichtsblätter, Jg. 29 (1977), pp. 28–36; Nachdruck in Studien zur Bonner Musikgeschichte des 18. und 19. Jahrhunderts, ed. by Marianne Bröcker and Günther Massenkeil, Cologne 1978, pp. 28–36
- Bemerkungen zu Beethovens op. 96, in Beethoven-Jahrbuch, Jg. 9 (1977), pp. 11–25
- The first version of Beethoven's g major string quartet, op. 18 No. 2, in Music and letters, vol. 58 (1977), pp. 127–152
- Über die Bedeutung der Skizzen Beethovens, in Bericht über den Internationalen Beethoven-Kongreß 20. bis 23. März 1977 in Berlin, Leipzig 1978, pp. 39–51
- Über die Bedeutung der Änderungen von Taktvorschriften in einigen Werken Beethovens, in Beiträge '76-78. Beethoven-Kolloquium 1977, Kassel 1978, pp. 37–51
- Ein Skizzenbuch Beethovens aus dem Jahre 1812. Zur Chronologie des Petterschen Skizzenbuches, in Zu Beethoven, ed. by Harry Goldschmidt, Berlin 1979, pp. 117–148
- Zur Textgeschichte von Beethovens Violinsonate op. 47, in Musik, Edition, Interpretation. Gedenkschrift Günther Henle, Munich 1980, pp. 111–124
- The Autograph of Beethoven's String Quartet in A Minor, Opus 132: The Structure of the Manuscript and its Relevance for the Study of the Genesis of the Work, in The String Quartets of Haydn, Mozart, and Beethoven, Cambridge 1980, pp. 278–301
- Die Beethoven-Autographen Johann Nepomuk Kafkas. Ein Beitrag zur Geschichte des Sammelns von Musikhandschriften, in Divertimento für Hermann J. Abs, Bonn 1981, pp. 89–133
- The Historical Background to the “Heiliger Dankgesang” in Beethoven’s A Minor Quartet op. 132, in Beethoven Studies, Vol. 3, ed. by Alan Tyson, Cambridge 1982, pp. 161–191
- Die Quellen zur Entstehungsgeschichte von Beethovens Streichquartett Es-Dur Op. 127, in Beethoven-Jahrbuch, Jg. 10 (1983), pp. 221–276
- Die „erste Fassung“ von Beethovens Righini-Variationen, in Festschrift Albi Rosenthal, Tutzing 1984, pp. 43–66
- Die Skizzen zur Neunten Symphonie, in Zu Beethoven 2, ed. by Harry Goldschmidt, Berlin 1984, pp. 88–129
- Once again: On the Question of the Repeat of the Scherzo and Trio in Beethoven's Fifth Symphony, in Beethoven Essays: Studies in Honor of Elliot Forbes, Cambridge 1984, pp. 146–198
- Die Stichvorlage zur Erstausgabe von Beethovens Pastoral symphony op. 68, eine neuaufgefundene Primärquelle, in Festschrift Rudolf Elvers zum 60. Geburtstag, Tutzing 1985, pp. 49–62
- Karl Lichnowsky. Ein Mäzen Beethovens, in Preziosen. Sammlungsstücke und Dokumente selbständiger Kulturinstitute der Bundesrepublik Deutschland, ed. by Günther Pflug, Bonn 1986, pp. 65–69
- Klaviertrios, in Beethoven und die Nachwelt. Materialien zur Wirkungsgeschichte Beethovens, ed. by Helmut Loos, Bonn 1986, pp. 15–23
- Künstlerroman und Biographie. Zur Entstehung des Beethoven-Mythos im 19. Jahrhundert, in Beethoven und die Nachwelt. Materialien zur Wirkungsgeschichte Beethovens, ed. by Helmut Loos, Bonn 1986, pp. 65–80
- Beethovens Oratorium Christus am Ölberge. Ein unbequemes Werk, in Beiträge zur Geschichte des Oratoriums seit Händel. Festschrift Günther Massenkeil zum 60. Geburtstag. ed. by Rainer Cadenbach, Bonn 1986, pp. 203–220
- Die Beethoveniana in der Musikaliensammlung des Erzherzogs Rudolph, in Spiegelungen, ed. by Werner Knopp, pp. 221–249
- Ludwig van Beethoven, der größte Sohn der Stadt Bonn, in Wandern in und um Bonn, ed. by Georg Romberg, Bonn, ca 1988, pp. 32–33
- Die Beethovenhandschriften in der Musikaliensammlung des Erzherzogs Rudolph, in Zu Beethoven 3, ed. by Harry Goldschmidt, Berlin 1988, pp. 141–176
- Beethovens Streichquartette op. 18, in Beethoven und Böhmen. Beiträge zu Biographie und Wirkungsgeschichte Beethovens, ed. von Sieghard Brandenburg und Martella Gutiérrez-Denhoff, Bonn 1988, pp. 229–309
- Alte Tradition neu belebt. Das Beethoven-Haus und seine Kammermusikfeste, in Beethoven-Archiv und Kammermusiksaal. Der Neubau, Bonn 1988, pp. 31–41
- Eine Stätte der Forschung. Die Stiftung Beethoven-Archiv, in Beethoven-Archiv und Kammermusiksaal. Der Neubau, Bonn 1988, pp. 43–47
- Die Sammlungen des Beethoven-Hauses in Bonn, in 1889–1989. Verein Beethoven-Haus, Bonn 1989, pp. 117–136
- Beethovens politische Erfahrungen in Bonn, in Beethoven zwischen Revolution und Restauration, ed. by Helga Lühning and Sieghard Brandenburg, Bonn 1989, pp. 3–50
- Ein Raum für Musik. Über den neuen Kammermusiksaal des Beethoven-Hauses Bonn, in Kulturberichte. Arbeitskreis selbständiger Kultur-Institute, 1989, issue 1, p. 29
- Ludwig van Beethoven, Eigenhändige Abschrift von drei Fugen aus G. F. Händels Concerti grossi op. 6, Mus. Hs. 40.188, in Beiträge zur musikalischen Quellenkunde. Katalog der Sammlung Hans Peter Wertitsch in der Musiksammlung der Österreichischen Nationalbibliothek, ed. by Günter Brosche, Tutzing 1989, pp. 5–10
- Zur Entstehung von Beethovens neunter Symphonie, in Von der Idee zum Werk. Eine Ausstellung des Arbeitskreises selbständiger Kultur-Institute e. V. im Rheinischen Landesmuseum Bonn vom 24. Januar bis 10. März 1991, Bonn 1991, pp. 231–243
- Eine neue Ausgabe der Briefe Beethovens, in 40 Jahre Theatergemeinde Bonn, Bonn 1991, pp. 45–56
- Beethovens Skizzen. Probleme der Edition, in Die Musikforschung, Jg. 44 (1991), pp. 346–355
- Beethovens Bonner Kompositionen. Eine Übersicht, in Monument für Beethoven. Zur Geschichte des Beethoven-Denkmals (1845) und der frühen Beethoven-Rezeption in Bonn, ed. by Ingrid Bodsch, Bonn 1995, pp. 9–27
- Beethovens Werke für Klavier und Violoncello. Ein Überblick, in 35. Beethovenfest Bonn 1997. Das Buch zum Programm, Bonn 1997, pp. 11–27
- Johanna van Beethoven’s Embezzlement, in Haydn, Mozart, & Beethoven: Studies in the Music of the Classical Period; Essays in Honour of Alan Tyson, ed. by Sieghard Brandenburg, Oxford 1998, pp. 237–251
- Zwei unbekannte Entwürfe Beethovens zu Spottkanons auf Rossini, in: Mitteilungsblatt der Wiener Beethoven-Gesellschaft, Jg. 31 (2000), issue 1, pp. 1–4
- Das Leonore-Skizzenbuch Mendelssohn 15. Einige Probleme der Chronologie, in Bonner Beethoven-Studien, volume 2 (2001), pp. 9–26
- Ein neu entdecktes Stammbuchblatt von Beethoven, in Österreichische Musikzeitschrift, Jg. 56 (2001), issue 5, pp. 56–57
- Auf Spuren von Beethovens Unsterbliche Geliebte. Einige kritische Überlegungen, in Österreichische Musikzeitschrift, Jg. 57 (2002), issue 6, pp. 5–8
- Rückblick nach vorn – 75 Jahre Beethoven-Archiv, in Kulturberichte. Arbeitskreis selbständiger Kultur-Institute, Jg. 17 (2002), issue 1, p. 6-9
- Ludwig van Beethoven, Violinkonzert D-Dur op. 61 (1806). Partitur, Bl. 104r (T. 77–82 aus dem Finale), in Musikerhandschriften von Heinrich Schütz bis Wolfgang Rihm, ed. by Günter Brosche, Stuttgart 2002, pp. 50–51
- Beethoven’s Opus 12 Violin Sonatas: On the Path to His Personal Style, in The Beethoven Violin Sonatas: History, Criticism, Performance, ed. by Lewis Lockwood, Urbana 2004, pp. 5–23
- Die Skizzen zu Beethovens Cellosonate op. 69, in Beethovens Werke für Klavier und Violoncello. Bericht über die Internationale Fachkonferenz Bonn, 18. – 20. Juni 1998, ed. by Sieghard Brandenburg, Ingeborg Maaß and Wolfgang Osthoff, Bonn 2004, pp. 173–212
- Sammeln und Bewahren – Edieren und Auswerten. Aus der Gründungszeit des Beethoven-Archivs, in Bonner Beethoven-Studien, volume 5 (2006), pp. 71–93

=== Editor ===
- Bonner Beethoven-Studien, volumes 1–3, together with Ernst Herttrich, Bonn 1999, 2001, 2003

=== Sheet music editions ===
- Ludwig van Beethoven, Keßlersches Skizzenbuch. Vollständiges Facsimile des Autographs, mit einem Nachwort und einem Register, Munich 1976
- Ludwig van Beethoven, Sechs Bagatellen für Klavier op. 126. Facsimile der Handschriften und der Originalausgabe, ed. by Sieghard Brandenburg, Bonn 1984
- Ludwig van Beethoven, Cello Sonata No. 3 op. 69. Das Autograph des ersten Satzes, ed. by Sieghard Brandenburg, Berlin and Düsseldorf 1992 (Facsimile-Ausgabe; Patrimonia, volume 28)
- Ludwig van Beethoven, Klaviersonate A-Dur opus 101. Fasimile nach dem Autograph im Besitz des Beethoven-Hauses Bonn, ed. by Sieghard Brandenburg, Munich 1998
- Ludwig van Beethoven, Sechste Symphonie F-Dur opus 68. Sinfonia pastorale. Faksimile nach dem Autograph BH 64 im Beethoven-Haus Bonn, ed. by Sieghard Brandenburg, Bonn 2000
- Ludwig van Beethoven, Klavierstück a-Moll WoO 59. Für Elise. Kritische Ausgabe mit Faksimile der Handschrift BH 116, ed. by Sieghard Brandenburg, Bonn 2002
- Wolfgang Amadeus Mozart, Leichte Stücke aus der Oper The Magic Flute, für Klavier vierhändig bearbeitet von Christian Gottlob Neefe, ed. by Sieghard Brandenburg, Mainz, London, Madrid, New York, Paris, Prag, Tokyo & Toronto (Schott Verlag), 2006
