= Joseph Schmidt-Görg =

German musicologist

- Born: Joseph Schmidt; 19 March 1897; Rüdinghausen
- Died: 3 April 1981 (aged 84); Bad Neuenahr
- Education: University of Bonn
- Occupations: Musicologist; Composer; Music editor
- Organizations: University of Bonn; Beethoven Archive

Joseph Schmidt-Görg (born Schmidt 19 March 1897 – 3 April 1981) was a German musicologist, composer and music editor. As a researcher at the University of Bonn and director of the Beethoven Archive, he is regarded as one of the leading Beethoven scholars of his time. He completed the new edition of Beethoven's complete works.

== Life ==
Born Joseph Schmidt in Rüdinghausen (now part of Witten), he studied musicology at the University of Bonn with Ludwig Schiedermair, also philosophy, pedagogy and experimental physics. He achieved the doctorate in 1926 with a dissertation about the masses by Clemens non Papa. He composed masses and other sacred music, including a mass for five-part choir in 1924, a motet, Christus natus est, for eight voices, the same year, and a mass Missa Exultet in 1927.

He officially changed his name in 1930. After his habilitation that year, on Mitteltontemperatur, he lectured at the university, was appointed professor in 1938, and Ordinarius in 1948. He was emerited in 1965.

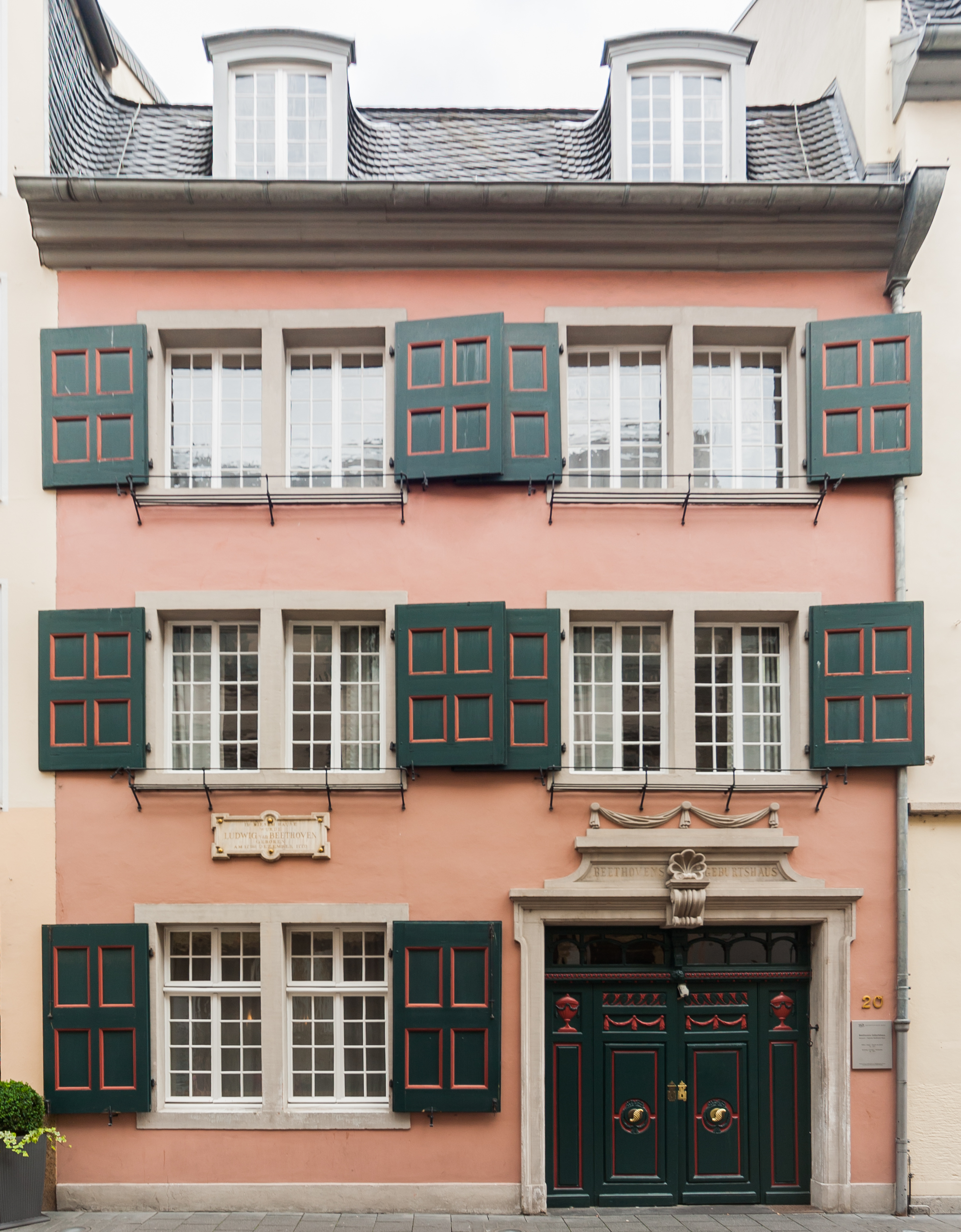
Beethoven House in Bonn

Schiedermair was a founding member and first director of the Beethoven Archive in Bonn in 1927. He called Schmidt-Görg to be his research assistant. Schmidt-Görg succeeded him as director in 1945 and held the post until 1972. He completed the new edition of Beethoven's complete works, Neue Beethoven-Gesamtausgabe, that Schiedermair had initiated. He edited piano works, in collaboration with his son Hans Schmidt. He also began the publications of the Beethoven House.

Schmidt-Görg died in Bad Neuenahr at the age of 84.

== Books ==
- Das rheinische Volkslied, Düsseldorf: Schwann, 1934
- Katalog der Handschriften des Beethoven-Hauses und des Beethoven-Archivs Bonn, Bonn 1935
- Nicolas Gombart, Kapellmeister Kaiser Karls V. Leben und Werk, Bonn: Röhrscheid, 1938
- Beethoven. Die Geschichte seiner Familie, Munich: Henle 1964
- Des Bonner Bäckermeisters Gottfried Fischer Aufzeichnungen über Beethovens Jugend, Munich: Henle, 1971
- Beethoven, as editor with Hans Schmidt
- Musik der Gotik, Bonn: Schwippert, 1946
- Beethoven: Dreizehn unbekannte Briefe an Josephine Gräfin Deym geb.v.Brunsvik. Bonn: Beethoven-Haus 1957

== Articles ==
- "Beethoven und das kurkölnische Geistesleben", in Allgemeine Musikzeitung, vol. 54 (1927), pp. 549f.
- "Zur Musikanschauung in den Schriften der hl. Hildegard", in Der Mensch und die Künste. Festschrift für Heinrich Lützeler zum 60. Geburtstag, Düsseldorf 1962, pp. 230–237
- "Ein Schiller-Zitat Beethovens in neuer Sicht", in Musik, Edition, Interpretation. Gedenkschrift Günther Henle, Munich 1980, pp. 423–426
