= Hans Schmidt (musicologist) =

German musicologist (1930–2019)

Hans Schmidt (1 September 1930 – 2 February 2019) was a German musicologist.

== Life ==
Born in Bonn, Schmidt was professor of musicology at the University of Cologne and a long-standing Beethoven researcher like his father Joseph Schmidt-Görg, who directed the Bonn Beethoven House from 1945 to 1972. Schmidt received his doctorate in 1954 at the Rheinische Friedrich-Wilhelms-Universität Bonn for his thesis Untersuchungen zu den Tractus des zweiten Tones aus dem Codex St. Gallen 359.

Schmidt died in Bad Neuenahr at the age of 88.

== Publications about Ludwig van Beethoven ==
=== Texts ===
- Ludwig van Beethoven, Beethoven-Archiv, Bonn 1970 (with Joseph Schmidt-Görg)
- Die Beethovenhandschriften des Beethovenhauses in Bonn, Beethoven-Archiv, Bonn 1971
- Das Beethoven-Haus in Bonn, Gesellschaft für Buchdruckerei, Neuss 1977
- Musik-Institut Koblenz – Dokumentation, Koblenz 1983

=== Articles ===
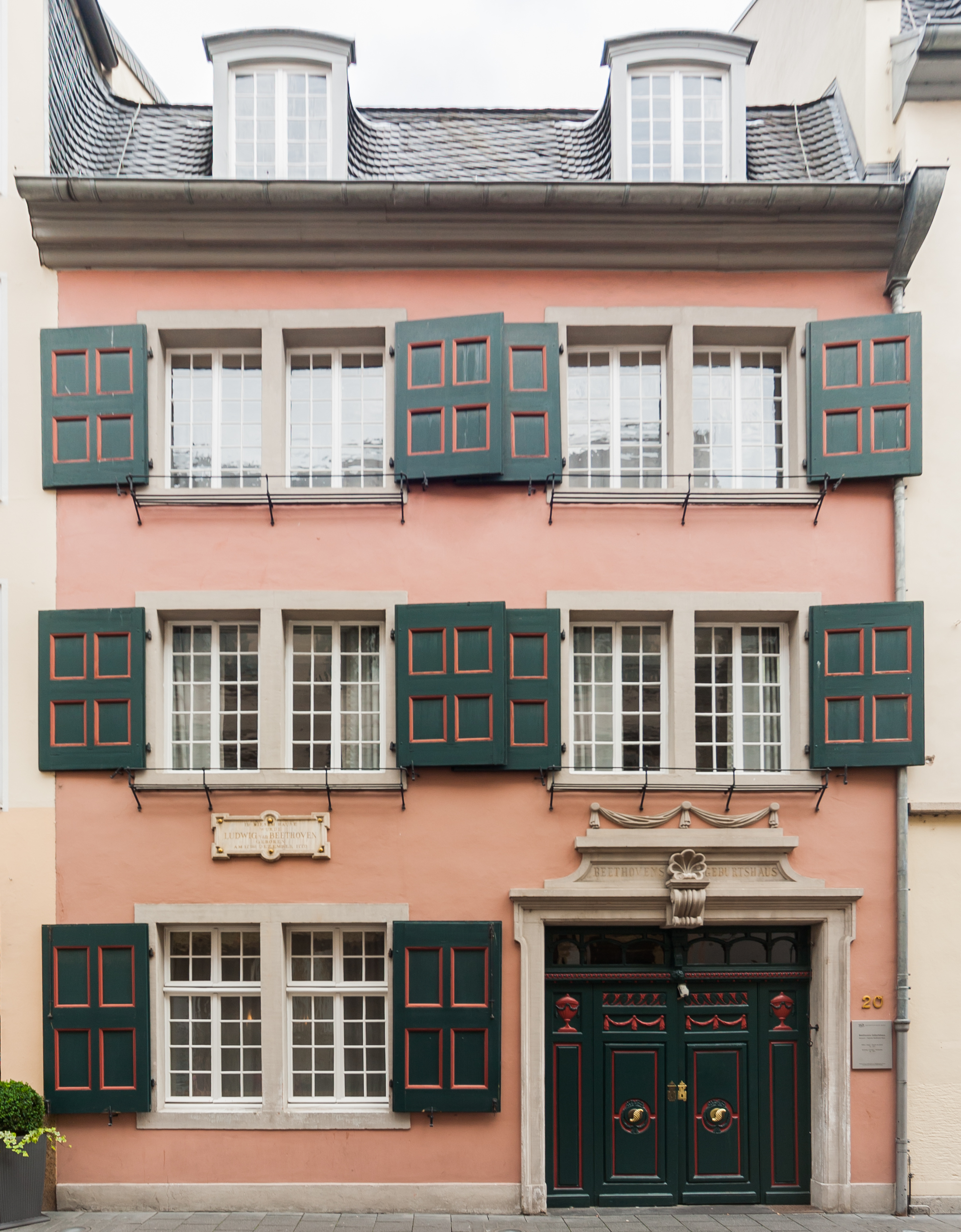
Beethoven House, Bonngasse 20

Ludwig van Beethoven, G. Henle Verlag.

- Piano sonatas, vol. I, Wissenschaftliche Gesamtausgabe, Abteilung VII, vol. 2, Munich 1971
- Klaviersonaten, vol. II, Wissenschaftliche Gesamtausgabe, Abteilung VII, vol. 3, Munich 1971
- Werke für Klavier zu vier Händen, Wissenschaftliche Gesamtausgabe, Abteilung VII, vol. 1, Munich 1966
- Große Fuge für Klavier zu vier Händen op. 134, Munich 1966

=== Books ===
- Die gegenwärtige Quellenlage zu Beethovens Choral Fantasy, in Colloquium amicorum, Joseph Schmidt-Görg for the 70th birthday, Bonn 1967
- Das Bonner Beethoven-Archiv, in Bonner Universitätsblätter, Bonn 1968
- Verzeichnis der Skizzen Beethovens, in Beethoven-Jahrbuch VI, Bonn 1969
- Ein Beethoven-Autograph? Über drei Streicherstimmen zu Beethovens Chorfantasie op. 80, die vermutlich nicht von Beethoven geschrieben worden sind, in Die Musikforschung 22, 1969
- Ludwig van Beethoven und seine Beziehungen zu Ehrenbreitstein, in Beethovens Beziehungen zu Koblenz und Ehrenbreitstein, Koblenz 1970
- Beethoven 1970 – Über die Grundlagen des heutigen Beethovenbildes, Typoskript, Bonn 1970
- Zur Errichtung einer Beethoven-Gedenkstätte in Ehrenbreitstein, on the occasion of Beethoven's 200th birthday, in the Bonner Universitätsblätter, Bonn 1970
- Ein wiederaufgefundenes Fidelio-Libretto, in Bericht über den Internationalen Musikwissenschaftlichen Kongress Bonn 1970, Bärenreiter-Verlag, Kassel 1971
- Die Beethovenhandschriften des Beethovenhauses in Bonn, in Beethoven-Jahrbuch VII, Bonn 1971
- Der freie Künstler Ludwig van Beethoven, in Die Welt der Symphony, aus Anlaß des 75jährigen Bestehens der Deutsche Grammophon Gesellschaft, Hamburg/Braunschweig 1972
- Die Grundlagen des heutigen Beethovenbildes, in the Österreichische Musikzeitschrift 28, 1973
- Zur Ausstellung der Sammlung Wegeler in Koblenz – 2. Juni 1973, in the Mitteilungen der Arbeitsgemeinschaft für rheinische Musikgeschichte, 1973
- Aus der Werkstatt eines Handschriftenfälschers – ein Liebesbrief Beethovens, in the Österreichische Musikzeitschrift 29, 1974
- Addenda und Corrigenda zum Katalog Die Beethovenhandschriften des Beethovenhauses in Bonn, in the Beethoven-Jahrbuch 8, Bonn 1975
- Beethovens Klaviersonaten E-Dur op. 109 und As-Dur op. 110, in the Textbeilage zu einer Schallplatte von Maurizio Pollini, Deutsche Grammophon, Hamburg 1975
- Klaviervariationen, in "Text supplement to a record" by Rudolf Buchbinder, Teldec, Hamburg 1976
- Das Bonner Beethoven-Archiv – zum fünfzigjährigen Bestehen, in Beethoven-Jahrbuch 9, 1977
- Ludwig van Beethoven – eine Dokumentation in Bildern und Manuskripten, in Beihefte der Beethoven-Edition der Deutschen Grammophon-Gesellschaft, Polydor, Hamburg 1977
- Beethoven und die deutsche Sprache, in the Österreichische Musikzeitschrift 32, 1977
- Beethoven und das Rheinland, in the Bonner Geschichtsblätter 30, 1978
- Edition und Aufführungspraxis am Beispiel von Beethovens Waldsteinsonate, in Beethoven-Kolloquium 1977; Dokumentation und Aufführungspraxis, Bärenreiter-Verlag, Kassel 1978
- Neue Hypothesen um Beethovens "unsterbliche Geliebte" , in the Österreichische Musikzeitschrift 35, 1980 (with Rudolf Klein)
- Beethovens Klaviervariationen, in Textbeilage zu einer Schallplatte von Rudolf Buchbinder, Warner Music Group 1988
- Beethovens besondere Art, Briefe zu schreiben, in Florilegium musicologicum – Hellmut Federhofer for the 65th birthday, Schneider, Tutzing 1988
- "Wir haben in unseren Finales gern rauschendere Passagen..." – Beethoven in seinen Klavierkonzerten, in Beiträge zur Geschichte des Konzerts – Festschrift Siegfried Kross for the 60th birthday, Schröder, Bonn 1990
- Ludwig van Beethoven in seinen Briefen an Eleonore von Breuning und Franz Gerhard Wegeler, in CD-Box, Music von Ludwig van Beethoven. Letter texts read by Will Quadflieg. Comments read by Heidi Leupolt. Overall concept in texts, pictures and music inserts by Schmidt, Polymedia / Deutsche Grammophon, Hamburg 1994
- Fidelio – Variationen einer Oper, in Beiheft zu CD-Box Complete Beethoven edition, Deutsche Grammophon, Hamburg 1997
- Fidelio - Problemwerk oder Schlüsselwerk Beethovens?, in Festschrift Christoph-Hellmut Mahling for the 65th birthday, Schneider, Tutzing 1997
- Zum Italienischen bei Ludwig van Beethoven – über den Gebrauch der italienischen Sprache in Beethovens Kompositionen und Briefen, beeinflusst durch Mozart's italienische Kompositionen, Salieris Unterricht und die Begegnung mit Rossini, in Aspetti musicali – Musikhistorische Dimensionen Italiens 1600 bis 2000, Festschrift for Dietrich Kämper for the 65th birthday, Verlag Dohr, Cologne 2001
- Systemik bei Beethoven. in Perspektiven und Methoden einer Systemischen Musikwissenschaft, Bericht über das Kolloquium im Musikwissenschaftlichen Institut der University of Cologne 1998, Peter Lang, Frankfurt 2003

== Festschrift for his 65th birthday ==
- Kirchenmusik in Geschichte und Gegenwart, Festschrift Hans Schmidt zum 65. Geburtstag, edited by Heribert Klein and Klaus Wolfgang Niemöller, Verlag Dohr, Cologne 1998
