= Mark Alexander (painter) =

British painter (born 1966)

- Born: 1966 (age 59–60); Horsham, West Sussex, England
- Education: Ruskin School of Art, Oxford (BFA, 1996)
- Known for: Painting
- Movement: Contemporary art
- Website: www.markalexanderart.com

Mark Alexander (born 1966) is a British contemporary painter based in Berlin whose work explores themes of temporal existence, cultural memory, and the intersection of historical and digital realities. Working through meticulous processes of reduction, erasure, and chromatic transformation, Alexander creates paintings that address what critics describe as "fundamentally disturbing ideas about ourselves and our times", while engaging with canonical imagery from Vincent van Gogh's Portrait of Dr. Gachet to Johann Paul Egell's Mannheim Altarpiece and American cultural symbols.

His paintings are held in public collections including the Musée National d'Art Moderne – Centre Pompidou, Paris, and several UK institutions.

== Early life and education ==
Alexander was born in Horsham, West Sussex. He came to painting relatively late, earning a BFA from the Ruskin School of Art, University of Oxford, in 1996 as a mature student.

== Career ==
Alexander's breakthrough came with his solo exhibition The Bigger Victory at Haunch of Venison, London, in 2005, which sold out before opening. The exhibition featured his series The Blacker Gachet (2005–06), in which he reinterpreted Van Gogh's famous portrait through near-black monochrome treatment. Works from this series have been noted for their "quasi-photographic" quality achieved through meticulous application of ink with "delicacy and precision", with a painting from the cycle selling for approximately £200,000 at Phillips de Pury in 2006.

Alexander's subsequent body of work Red Mannheim (2010) explored Johann Paul Egell's 18th-century high altar through screenprint technique using oil instead of traditional ink. The Bode Museum noted that Alexander used "the silk-screen print technique to create his paintings. But instead of the usual ink he used oil to give his work a denser, more intense aura. This is primarily achieved through the paint that was allowed to flow downward from the upper edge of the large, multipanel work before drying". Two versions of the nine-panel work were prominently displayed at St Paul's Cathedral, London, in 2010 as part of the Cathedral Art Programme.

In 2013, Alexander presented American Bog at Broadway 1602, New York, which reframed American patriotic emblems in tar-black resin.

Alexander served as artist-in-residence at Beethoven-Haus, Bonn (2014–15), where he created his first Beethoven portraits based on Joseph Karl Stieler's 1820 portrait of the composer. He presented Wrestling with Angels at the Gemäldegalerie, Berlin, in 2016.

== Artistic approach ==
Alexander's practice spans multiple thematic concerns including cultural memory, temporal existence, and the relationship between historical and contemporary realities. His series American Bog addresses "cultural overexposure" and aims to "refresh overused icons and forge a new symbolic language" amid contemporary challenges. He has stated that his fascination with damaged historical artworks stems from their transformation: "I think it looks more powerful now than when it was this rather cute rococo work. What´s happened to it has made it more powerful, more 'primitive'. It´s interesting how history and time act on things". Critics have identified themes of erosion, absence and memory in his work, with Adrian Searle writing that the early works "suck light and time out of the originals until only ghosts remain".

== Critical reception ==
Alexander's work has been featured in several scholarly publications on contemporary art, including Dr. Kelly Grovier's Art Since 1989. His practice encompasses what has been described as work "influenced by digital shifts" that "reflect changing societal perceptions, predominantly through analog methods".

Writing for BBC Culture, Grovier has positioned Alexander alongside American artist Kara Walker as contemporary artists who have "kept gleaming" the artistic tradition of meaningful black imagery that connects to historical masters like Anubis, Caravaggio, Michelangelo, and Rembrandt. Grovier describes Alexander's The Blacker Gachet (2006) as "a masterclass in black's enduring capacity to resurrect the spirit of physical loss", noting how "the artist's echoing hand rescue[s] from oblivion every brushstroke of Van Gogh's original to sculpt a gaze that glows longingly from whatever undiscovered realm lies waiting for us in the great beyond".

Charlotte Mullins includes his early portraits in Picturing People: The New State of the Art, noting the "temporal drag" of his pigment handling.

== Selected solo exhibitions ==
- 2005 – The Bigger Victory, Haunch of Venison, London
- 2009 – A Blacker Gold, Haunch of Venison, Berlin
- 2010 – Red Mannheim, St Paul's Cathedral, London
- 2013 – American Bog, Broadway 1602, New York
- 2016 – Wrestling with Angels, Gemäldegalerie, Berlin
- 2021 – Love Between the Atoms, Sauvage, Düsseldorf

== Collections ==
- Musée National d'Art Moderne – Centre Pompidou, Paris
- Public holdings in the United Kingdom, catalogued by ArtUK
- Thea Westreich Wagner and Ethan Wagner Collection (donated to the Whitney Museum of American Art)
