= Beethoven House =

Birthplace of Ludwig van Beethoven and museum

Beethoven-Haus Bonn
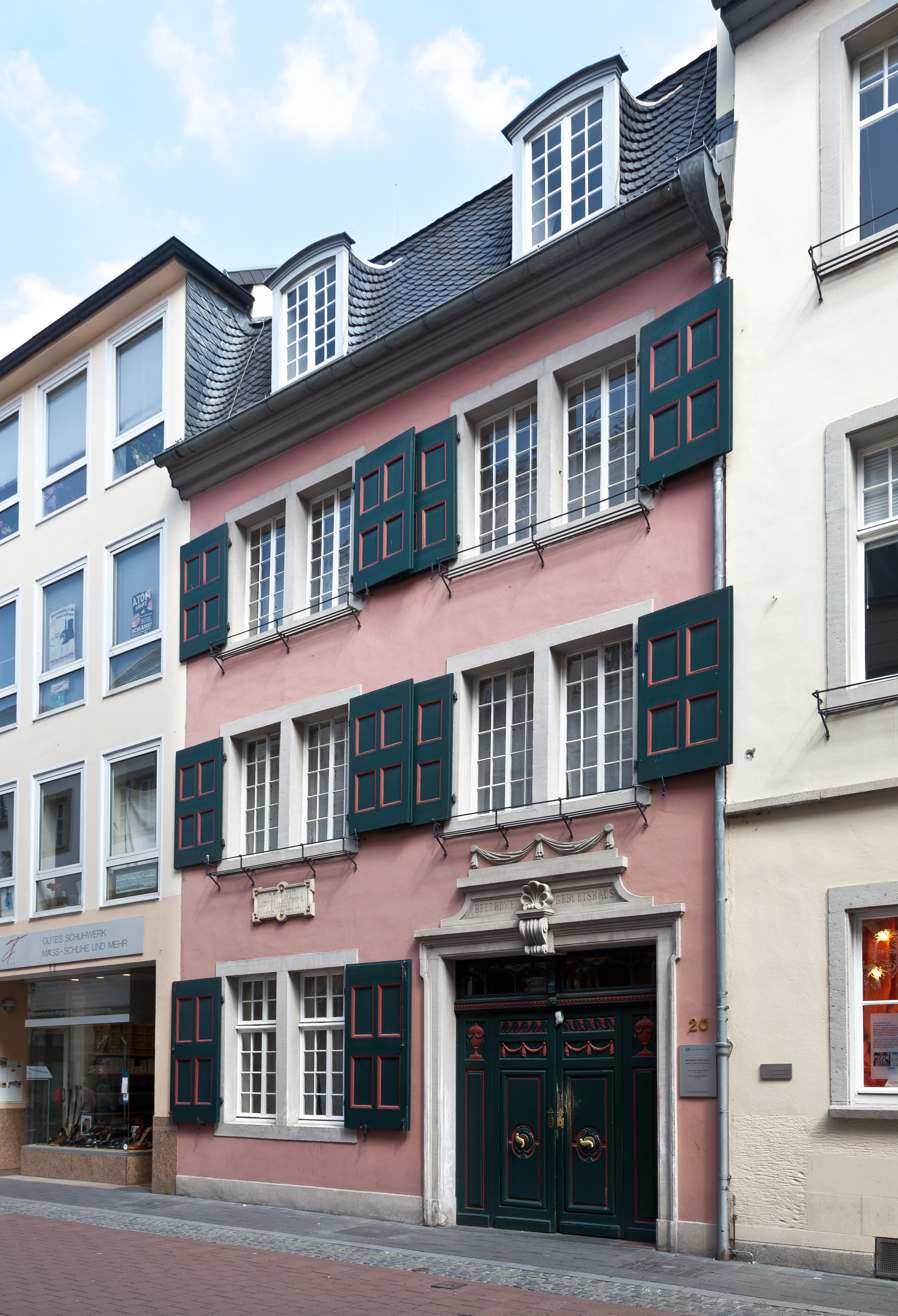
- Ludwig van Beethoven birthplace at Bonngasse (center) in Bonn, Germany
- Location: Bonn
- Coordinates: 50°44′13″N 7°6′5″E
- Type: Museum, cultural institution, memorial site
- Visitors: 100,000 (before Corona)
- Director: Malte Boecker
- Website: www.beethoven.de

The Beethoven House (German: Beethoven-Haus) in Bonn, Germany, is a memorial site, museum, and cultural institution serving various purposes. Founded in 1889 by the Beethoven-Haus association, it studies the life and work of composer Ludwig van Beethoven.

The centrepiece of the Beethoven-Haus is Beethoven's birthplace at Bonngasse 20. This building houses the museum. The neighbouring buildings (Bonngasse 18 and 24 to 26) accommodate a research centre (Beethoven archive) comprising a collection, a library and publishing house, and a chamber music hall. Here, music lovers and experts from all over the world can meet and share their ideas. The Beethoven-Haus is financed by the Beethoven-Haus association and by means of public funds.

== History of Bonngasse 20 ==
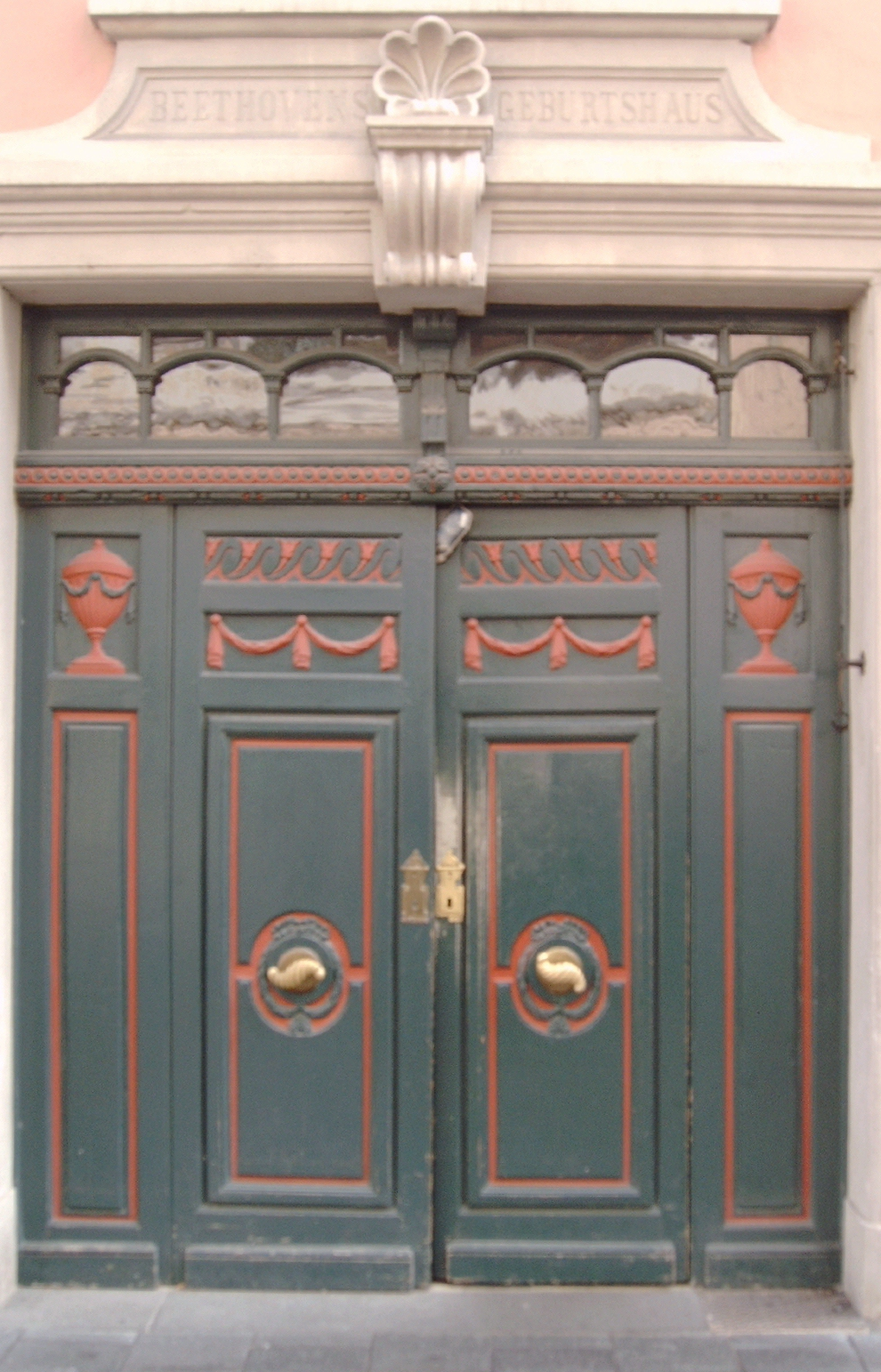
Portal of Bonngasse 20, Ludwig van Beethoven's birthplace on 17 December 1770

=== 18th century ===
The house at Bonngasse 20 (formerly: 515) featuring a baroque stone facade was erected around 1700 on an older cellar vault. It is one of the few remaining middle class houses from the era of the prince elector. Back then it was in the neighbourhood preferred by the employees of the courts, in the heart of the town between the castle, the town hall with the market square and the banks of the Rhine River. This is currently a pedestrian precinct close to Bonn Beethoven Hall and the opera close.

=== 19th century ===
In the first half of the 19th century, an additional, somewhat smaller, timbered house was built on the property behind the house. Five families temporarily lived in the multi-storey front and back buildings. Three tailors and one shoemaker also had their shops here. In 1836 the entrance door was widened and replaced with a gate entrance. After the back part of the house was identified as Beethoven's birthplace around 1840 by Beethoven's friend Franz Gerhard Wegeler, a physician, and Carl Moritz Kneisel, a teacher, the new owner opened a restaurant on the ground floor in 1873 with the name Beethoven's Geburtshaus (Beethoven's birthplace). A beer and concert hall was added in the yard in 1887. In 1888 a grocery merchant bought the house but sold it a year later. The Beethoven Haus association, founded in 1889 to preserve the house, spared the house from demolition. The following years were characterised by renovation and remodelling works to turn the house into a memorial site. At the time, major parts of the building were still as they had been in the second half of the 18th century. In order to preserve spacious museum rooms, the floor plans of the main house were changed and an office for the association, plus a library and a flat for the janitor were installed. Construction changes in Beethoven's flat were limited to the stairs and the passageways to the front building. The inner yard was decorated with trellises and sandstone slabs, and a garden replaced the place where the beer hall had been. It has not been remodelled since. In order to preserve the character of Beethoven's birthplace in its contemporary environment and to protect the building, the association bought the neighbouring house number 22 in 1893. After installing a fire protection wall, the building was sold again.

=== 20th century ===
In 1907, house number 18 was bought to extend the property. This house is one of the oldest, still present 18th-century buildings in Bonn. Gertrud Baum, Ludwig van Beethoven's godmother, lived here with her family. Beethoven's baptism is said to have taken place here on 17 December 1770. In the middle of the 19th century, the house accommodated a store for colonial goods. Around that time, the figure on the front and the byname "Im Mohren" (to the blackamoor) appeared for the first time. The figure features the ideas of the 19th century. It combines the attributes of different subdued peoples: The dark skin colour and feather ornaments and pipe refers to the indigenous nations of Central- and South Africa and North America. In the course of the colonial history during the 19th century the term "blackamoor" became a negative stereotype at the latest due to enslavement and colonialism and cannot be separated from this context historically. At first used as an apartment building, in 1927 the newly founded Beethoven archive moved in Bonngasse 18. In the mid-1930s both houses were extensively renovated. Both buildings including its front were declared a historic monument in 1985.

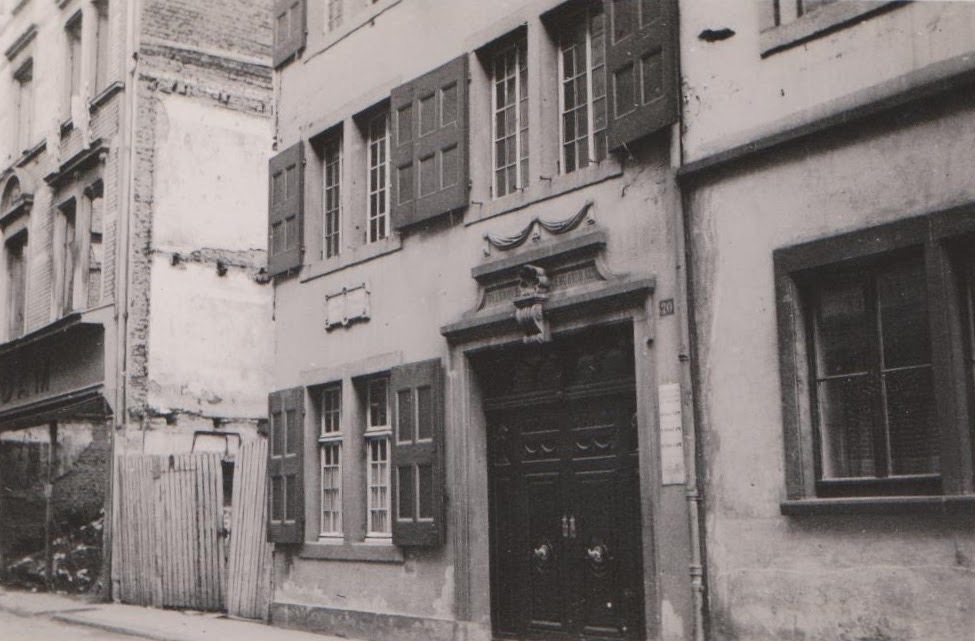
Beethoven-Haus in 1947

The Beethoven-Haus survived both World Wars almost unscathed. In World War II, senior building officer Theodor Wildemann, who later served as the association's chairman, in made sure that the collection was brought to an underground shelter near Siegen, avoiding any war-related losses or damages. During a bombing of Bonn's city centre on 18 October 1944, a fire bomb fell on the roof of Beethoven's birthplace. Due to the help of janitors Heinrich Hasselbach and Wildemans, who were later awarded the German Federal Cross of Merit, and Dr. Franz Rademacher from the Rhenish National Museum, the bomb did not cause a disaster. The damages were repaired in the early 1950s. In the late 1960s, the third renovation took place. For the fourth, basic renovation of the buildings from 1994 to 1996 the Beethoven-Haus was awarded the Europa Nostra award for cultural heritage (awarded since 1978) in 1998 as the first institution in Germany.

=== 21st century ===
In January 2003, the Deutsche Post AG issued a stamp featuring the Beethoven-Haus. The stamp belongs to the definitive stamp series "Sights".

== Flats of the Beethoven family ==
In 1767, court singer Johann van Beethoven (1740–1792) moved into the garden wing of the house at Bonngasse 20 after marrying Maria Magdalena Keverich (1746–1787) from Koblenz/Ehrenbreitstein. Johann's father, bandmaster Ludwig van Beethoven (1712–1773), the composer's grandfather, moved into a flat located in the house diagonally opposite. The front building was the residence of the court musician Philipp Salomon and his family. His son Johann Peter Salomon, a later friend of Joseph Haydn, would later become important for Beethoven as well. The ground floor of the Beethovens' flat accommodated a kitchen and a utility room with a cellar. The first floor housed two smaller and a somewhat larger room for the family.

It was probably in one of the tiny attic chambers that Ludwig van Beethoven was born on 16 or 17 December 1770 and baptised in St. Remigius on 17 December 1770. The child was named after his grandfather Ludwig van Beethoven (1712–1773), a reputable court bandmaster, singer and wine merchant, who was also his godfather. The baptism celebration took place in the neighbouring house Im Mohren at the residence of Beethoven's godmother Anna Gertrud Baum, née Müller. The family grew quickly. However, out of the seven children only Ludwig and two brothers survived: Kaspar Anton Karl (1774–1815) and Nikolaus Johann (1776–1848). Around 1774 the Beethoven family moved into the house Zum Walfisch owned by baker Fischer at Rheingasse no. 24. Ludwig van Beethoven's father and grandfather had temporarily lived here, too. The family made its living by working for the Court.

From 1784 onwards, even the young Beethoven joined the court orchestra, Beethoven and his father gave private music lessons to the families of noble Court officials. During his time in Bonn, friendships with noble and bourgeois families were established such as the widow of Court Counsellor von Breuning and her children Stephan, Christoph, Eleonore, and Lorenz, the family of violinist Fran Anton Ries and with Franz Gerhard Wegeler. Many of these friendships lasted a lifelong and had a far greater impact on Beethoven's education than the few years he spent at school. In 1785 the family moved to Wenzelgasse 25. Of all the residences of the Beethoven family, the only one that remains today is Beethoven's birthplace at Bonngasse.

== The museum ==
The museum was opened on 10 May 1893 during the second chamber music festival. It was extended several times. Today, it houses the largest Beethoven collection in the world.

=== Museum building ===
The museum includes two formerly separate buildings: the front building and the annex toward the garden where the composer spent the first years of his life. When setting up the buildings as a museum, they were connected. The rambling rooms with their low ceilings, the creaking stairs in the back building and the wooden floors in the listed building of the 18th century convey an impression of the living conditions of that time.

=== Permanent exhibition ===
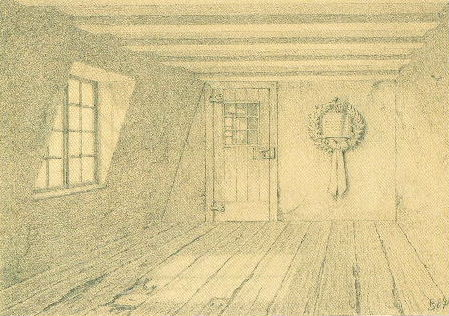
Reiner Beißel in Bonn, the room where Beethoven was born, depicted in an 1889 illustration

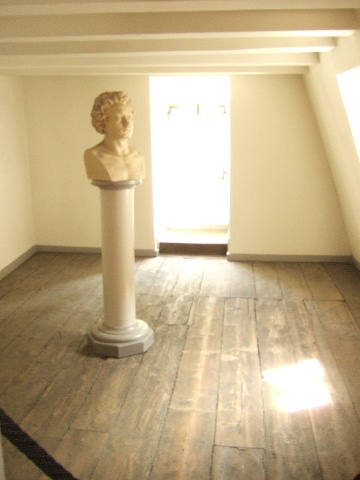
The room with the Beethoven bust, created in 1827 by Josef Danhauser

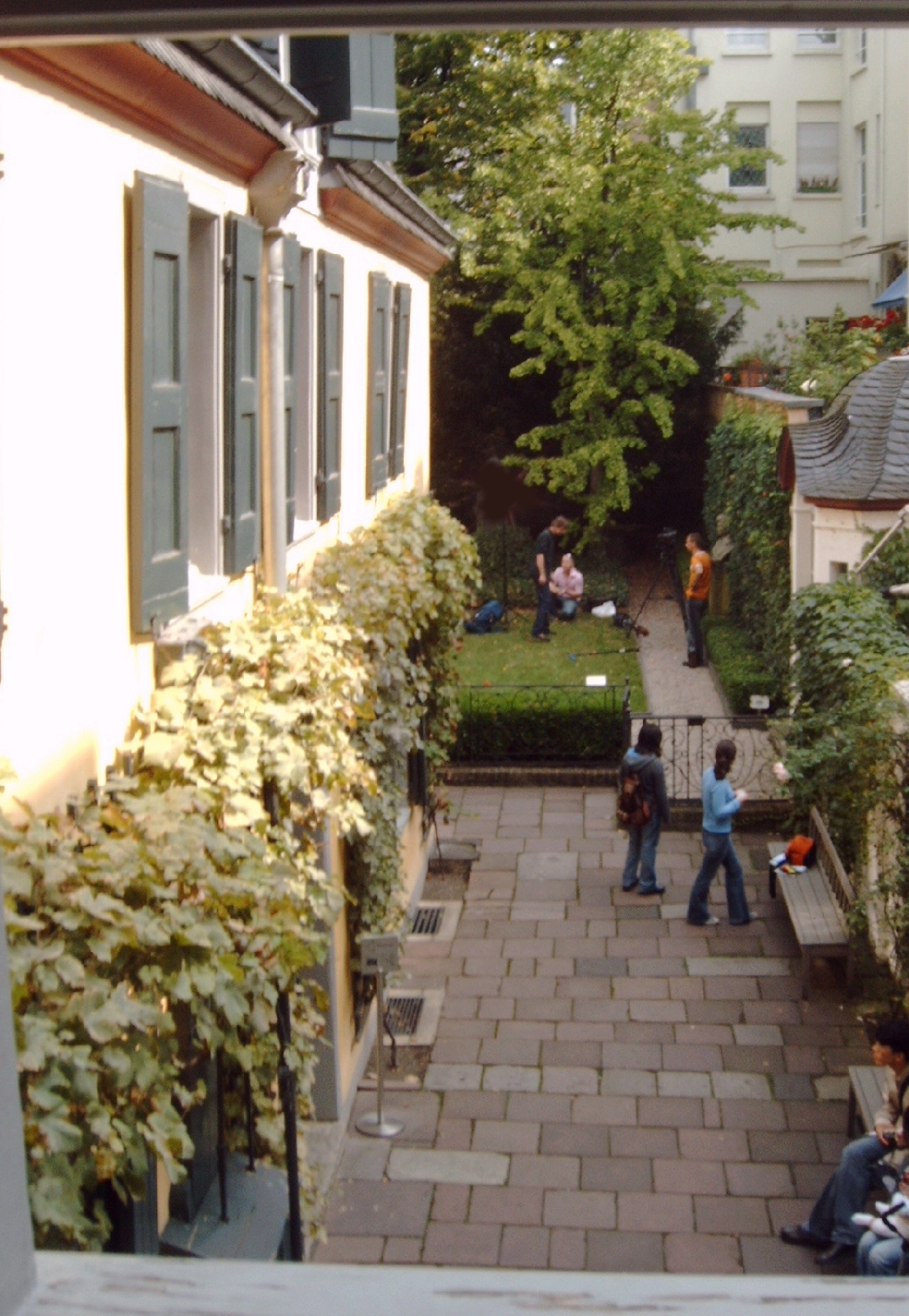
The first floor of the garden in September 2005

In the 20th century, the permanent exhibition was renewed several times. The original concept focused on a reconstruction of the house and on the display of a lot of items. When the rooms and the exhibition were refurbished and updated the last time in 1995 and 1996, the idea was to give visitors the opportunity to experience a step back in time when viewing the 150 exhibits from the proprietary collection of the Beethoven Haus. Portraits, manuscripts, sheet music printouts, instruments and items of everyday life give an insight into Beethoven's life and work. For Beethoven's 250th birthday in 2020, the exhibition was extended and renovated. Opened on 17 December 2019, the design by the Holzer Kobler architect firm and Studio TheGreenEyl and Lichtvision Design gave visitors a fully updated form of the permanent exhibition. They reorganized the exhibition and replaced the chronological structure with a thematic one. Multimedia installations complemented the displayed objects and the house itself became an exhibition piece through the choice of color and the exhibition pieces themselves that were chosen wisely for every room.

On display are the baptism entry in the register of St. Remigius, the poster announcing Beethoven's first public performance in Cologne in 1778, the first printed composition from 1783 and a portrait of Beethoven's grandfather. Paintings of Beethoven's employers Elector Maximilian Friedrich von Königsegg-Rothenfels and Elector Maximilian Franz from Austria as well as his official viola illustrate Beethoven's activity as a member of the Bonn court band. The room connecting the buildings shows the historic console of the organ that once stood in St. Remigius' Church (former Minoriten church) and that Beethoven regularly played since he was ten years old. The console was given to the Beethoven-Haus when the church was reconstructed in 1904.

Distinct from the organ it pertained to, the console survived World War II. Silhouettes and portraits of the von Breuning family, greeting cards to Beethoven from Eleonore von Breuning, pictures of Franz Gerhard Wegeler and Christian Gottlob Neefe depict some of the people most influential for Beethoven's personal development and musical education. The relocation to Vienna is represented by the famous entry of Count Ferdinand Ernst von Waldstein in Beethoven's register, wishing Beethoven "Mozart's spirit from Haydn's hands" when taking lessons with Haydn in Vienna. (The original register is in Vienna).

Twelve exhibition rooms illustrate Beethoven's early years as piano player and composer as well as his master compositions. On display are portraits of Beethoven's teachers Joseph Haydn, Johann Georg Albrechtsberger and Antonio Salieri, the string quartet instruments provided by Prince Karl von Lichnowsky, a patron of Beethoven during the first years in Vienna (on permanent loan from the State Institute for Music Research, Prussian Cultural Heritage, Berlin), Beethoven's last instrument, the pianoforte from Conrad Graf, and selected composition editions. Portraits of the composer in various stages of his life, the famous bust from Vienna sculptor Franz Klein (1779–1840), Josef Danhauser's lithography "Beethoven on his deathbed" and the death mask deliver an impression of Beethoven's appearance. Franz Xaver Stöber's watercolour depicting the funeral cortege on 29 March 1827 shows how much Beethoven was recognized and revered even in his lifetime. Beethoven's hearing problems are documented by the exhibited ear trumpets and a conversation booklet, i.e. a booklet in which Beethoven's interlocutors wrote down what they had to say. Letters, notes, various contemporary music instruments and items of daily life give an idea of Beethoven as a human being, his everyday life still with his handycap, his relationships and lifestyle.

Located in the back of the museum is the original living area of the Beethoven Family. It got renewed and redesigned as well. Nowadays a diorama on the ground floor clarifies the distance and location between the city center of Bonn, the Bonner Münster, the electoral castle, the marketplace and the Bonngasse. On the second floor visitors get the opportunity to experience and listen to five significant early works from Beethoven in the new sound room.

The nucleus of the exhibition is the so-called birth room, the presumable parent's bedroom, which, compared to the old design appears in a new, more modern character. Visitors are now allowed to step into the room which is equipped with a large mirror. Sheet material of Beethoven is displayed on the mirror and creates a sensible as well as a poetic atmosphere that enables the visitor to feel connected to Beethoven.

=== Treasury and music room ===
Set up in the basement of the neighboring house is the treasury. The treasury was built to display original and special features from the collection of the Beethoven-Haus under conservatory and museum conditions. Above the treasury is a new music room which is used for small concerts. The peculiarity about concerts in the new music room is that musicians use old and historic instruments from the time Beethoven was alive.

=== Special exhibitions ===
Apart from the permanent exhibition the museum offers theme-related special exhibitions several times a year. These exhibitions are often linked to special events such as recent purchases or anniversaries. In 1998 the newly acquired Wegeler collection was presented. The 50th anniversary of the acquisition of the Bodmer collection was celebrated with a retrospective exhibition, and in 2010 the autograph of the Diabelli Variations was presented to the public.

On other occasions, contemporaries were reanimated using collection items and items on loan, such as Beethoven's teacher Christian Gottlob Neefe (1999), piano builder family Streicher (1999) and the Breitkopf & Härtel publishing house (2007), poet Johann Wolfgang von Goethe (1999) and painter and drawer Moritz von Schwind (2004/2005). Furthermore, renowned Beethoven researchers were dedicated a separate exhibition, like for example diplomat and Beethoven biographer Alexander Wheelock Thayer (1817–1897) in 2010 on the 100th anniversary of the publication day of the last volume of his Beethoven biography in 1911, or Max Unger (2000). The reception of Beethoven's music by musicians such as Johannes Brahms (1997), Richard Strauss (2002) or Paul Hindemith (2009) and artists like Naoum Aronson (2003), a student of Rodin, or Joseph Beuys (2005) was also addressed in special exhibitions, the same as The Operatic Life in Time of Beethoven, The collector of autographs Stefan Zweig, Beethoven's journeys in context of traveling in the 18th century and many others. Themes of master courses (Beethoven's String quartetts in 2011 and Piano sonates in 2012, courses for pianists, string trios, quartetts and so on) and congresses (Beethoven's Dedications in 2011, Congress of Vienna 1814–15 in 2014, With Beethoven living in Exile in 2018, Beethoven and Rossini in the same, and now in 2020 Beethoven – Perspectives) are also presented by exhibition for the public.

For some years now exhibitions accompanying the Bonn Beethoven festival have been organised. In 2009, under the motto "The power of music" theatre and concert shows relating to Beethoven performances held at the Bandō prisoner-of-war camp for German soldiers in Japan were performed, whereas in 2010 the focus was on Beethoven's chamber music compositions, in which the composer ventured out into the open ("Into the open" was the motto of the 2010 Beethoven festival). In 2015, the British Artist Mark Alexander (born 1966) created a series of work titled Credo I–V, to commemorate 245th anniversary of Beethoven's birth. Additional publications offer more information. Some special exhibitions are archived on the homepage of the Beethoven-Haus and can be accessed permanently.

=== The garden ===
The garden of the Beethoven-Haus contains a collection of Beethoven busts dating back to the beginning of the 20th century.

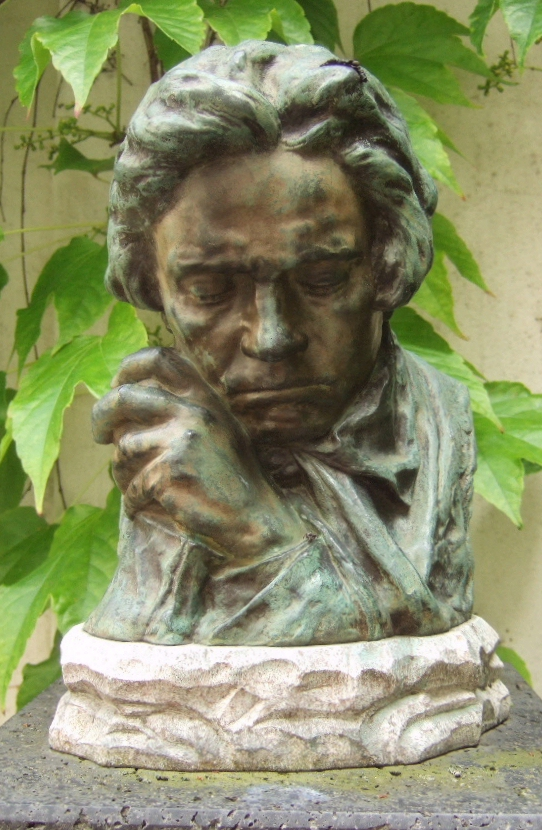
Pierre-Felix Masseau (1902)

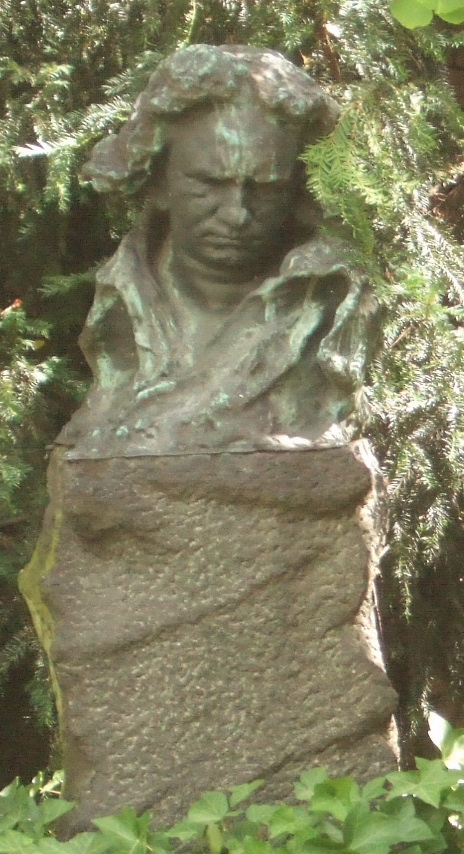
Naoum Aronson (1905)

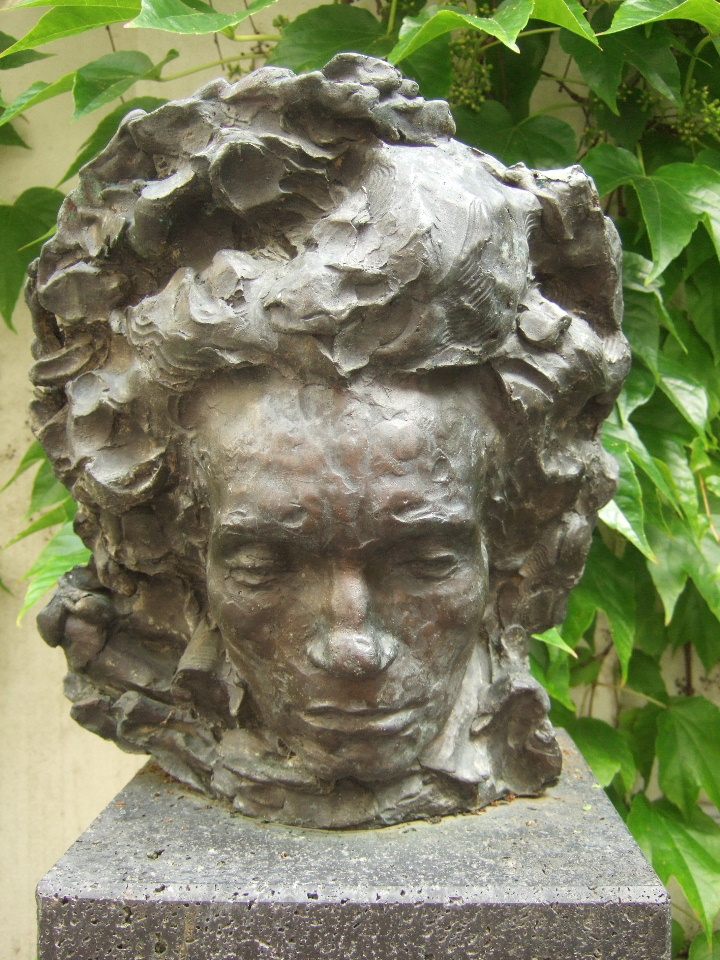
Fernando Cian (1st quarter of the 20th century)

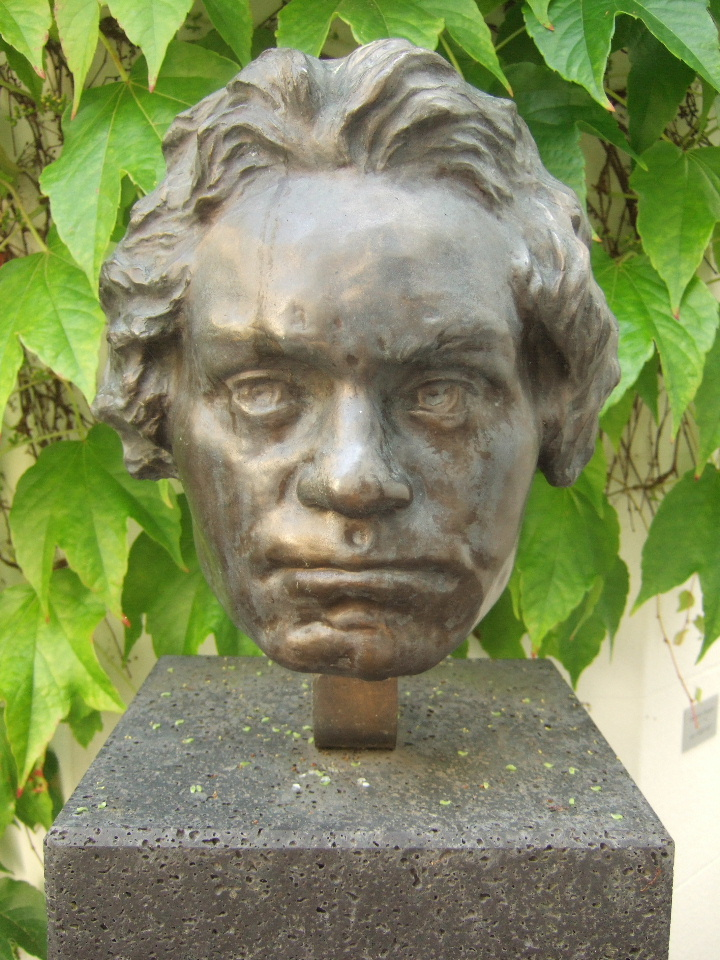
Wilhelm Hüsgen (1927/1929)

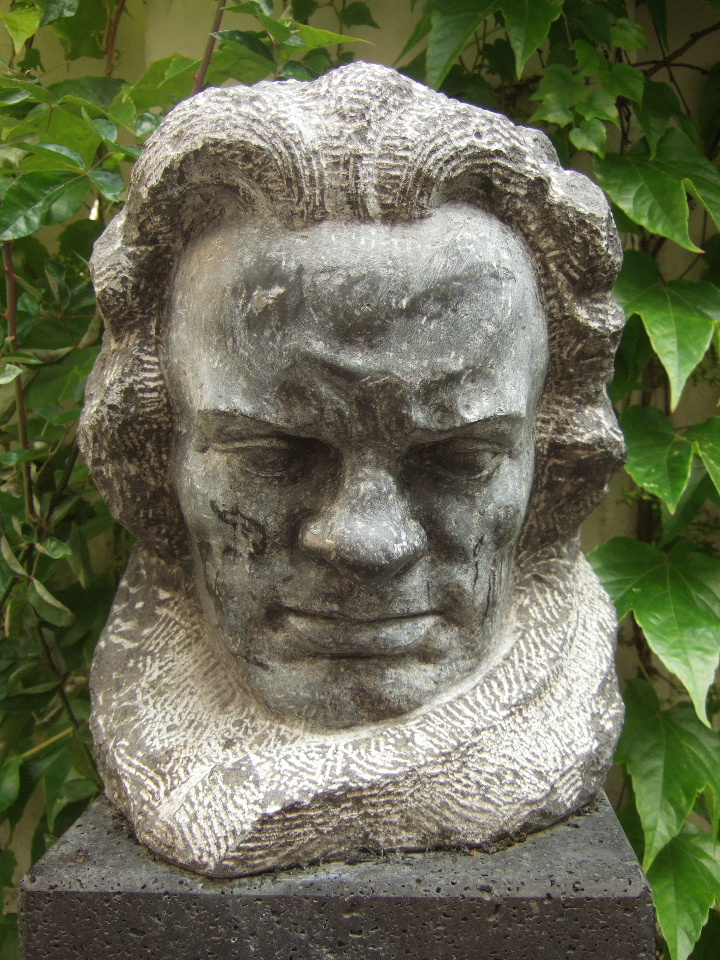
Eduard Merz (1945/1946)

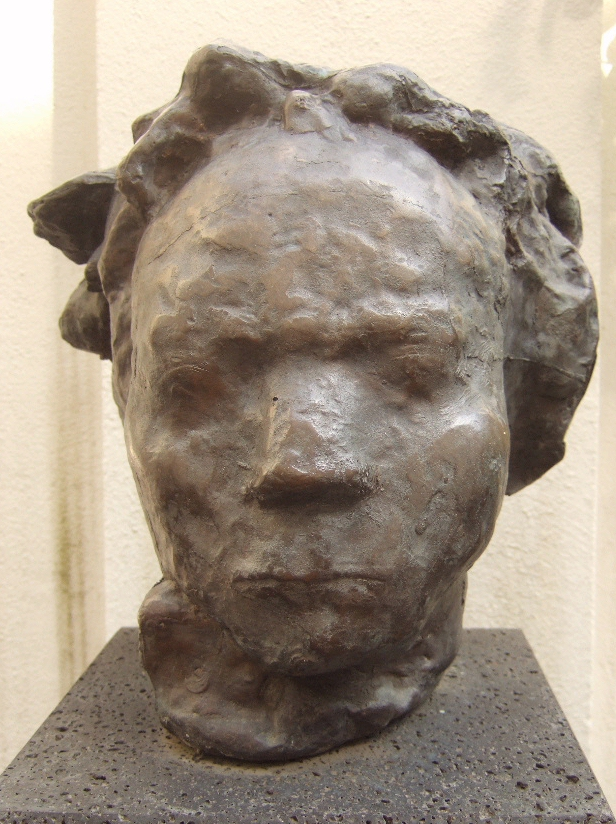
Lewon Konstantinowitsch Lasarew (1981)

== Digital Beethoven-Haus ==
The studio for digital collections where visitors see and read and partially even explore by listening all the digitised documents as well as manuscripts and first prints of compositions, letters and pictures is now located on the other side of the Bonngasse, where the shop and the lecture hall are found. The official website, created in 2004 and awarded for concept and design, was given the title Master of Excellence at the 17th Corporate Media competition in 2005.

== The chamber music hall ==
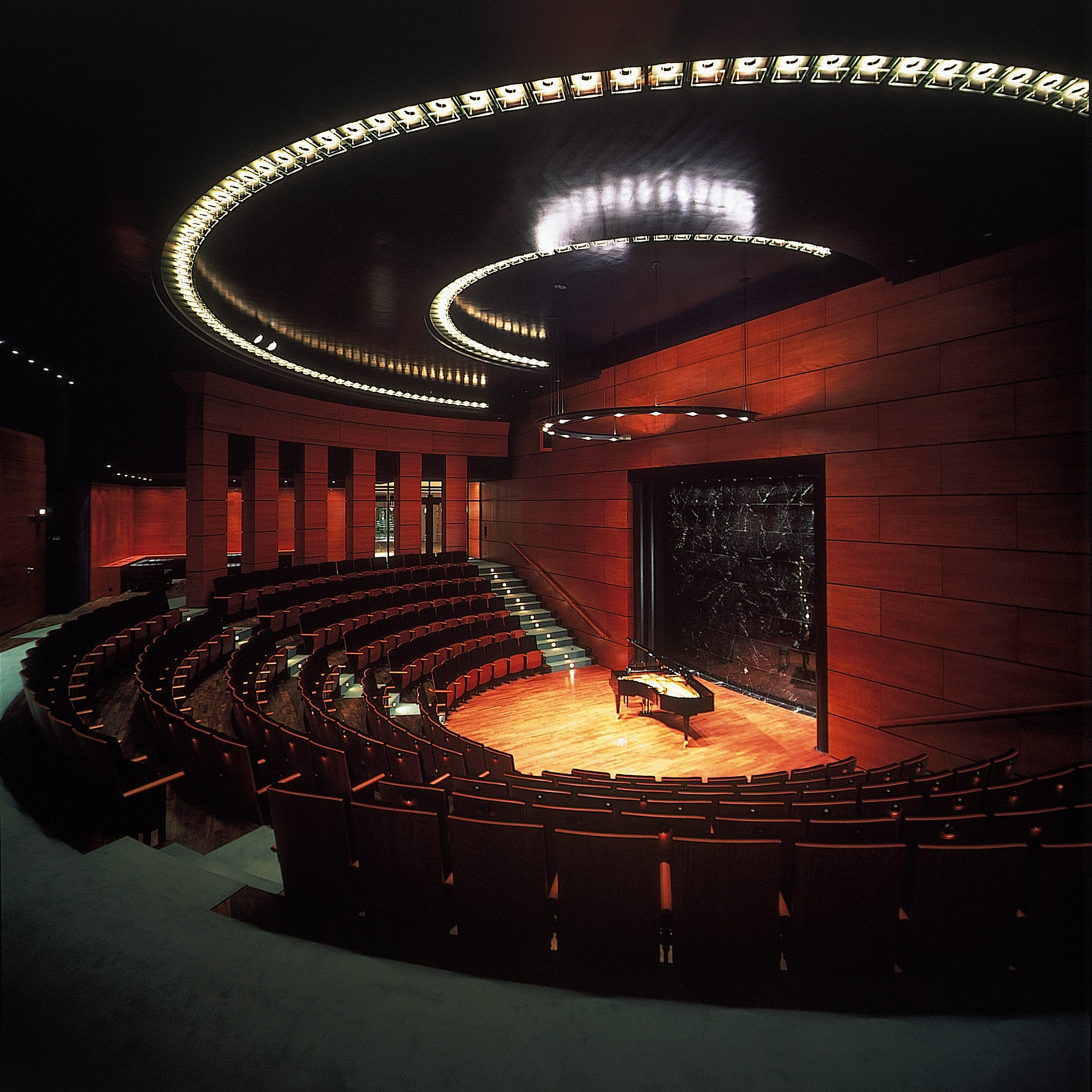
The chamber music hall

Apart from its research aims related to music history, the Beethoven-Haus association has always organised chamber music festivals and concerts on its premises. On the 100th anniversary of the association in 1989, the newly constructed chamber music hall was inaugurated in the building next to Beethoven's birthplace. It is named after the former chairman Hermann Josef Abs, who had initiated the construction and supported it generously. Held in the tradition of a semi-oval amphitheatre, the hall accommodates 199 seats and offers great acoustics and a very private atmosphere. The architects Thomas van den Valentyn and Klaus Müller were awarded several prizes for it (German Architect Award 1989, Mies van der Rohe Award 1990 and the Gold Award for interior design in 1991). In combination with the other Beethoven-Haus institutions, the chamber music hall is an ideal venue for concerts and can also be booked for concerts, congresses and other events.

== Concerts and events ==
=== Concert series ===
The annual programme of the chamber music hall with its more or less 40 events is characterised both by tradition and modern approaches, comprising classic chamber music performed by famous ensembles and solo musicians as well as young artists at the beginning of their career. Concerts played on historical instruments give an impression of the time Beethoven lived in. Contemporary jazz offers the opportunity for improvisation and inspiration, family concerts and events for elementary schools let children and parents alike explore classic music, and theme-focused series and conversation forums allow visitors to meet composers and learn about music eras and cultural phenomena. The department management is responsible for programme and artistic direction.

=== Junior staff development ===
Following Beethoven's example as a teacher, the Beethoven-Haus has been offering a research-focused study programme for students and young music scientists since 2007, dealing with selected research topics on Beethoven. The master classes initiated by Kurt Masur in 2006 aim at promoting the development of young musicians. Initially, the classes were only available for conductors. Since 2010 chamber music ensembles can also participate in these classes, where famous artists study and perform Beethoven compositions with young musicians during public rehearsals. In addition, the students have access to the corresponding manuscripts, can discuss themes on philology, music history and performance techniques with the staff of the Beethoven-Haus and can obtain advice on how to interpret Beethoven's compositions.

==== Composers residency and mentoring ====
Since 2013 the Beethoven-Haus uses the Villa Wasmuth, former residence of the art collector Johannes Wasmuth (1936–1997) in Rolandswerth (Rolandseck, Rhineland) and now owned by the Foundation Hans Arp und Sophie Taeuber-Arp e. V., as a guesthouse. Furthermore, selective promotion of young researchers, musicians, composers and artists by the Beethoven-Haus takes place in that residence. In cooperation with the German Academic Scholarship Foundation the Beethoven-Haus awards scholarships to young composers, who are allowed to work there on their compositions for a month under the guidance of mentors. The project ends with the first performance of their works.

Since 2013, the Beethoven-Haus also organizes mentoring supported by Bonn Rotary Club and Foundation Arp e. V. Young musicologists and musicians have the chance to promote their academic or artistic studies. They stay in the Villa Wasmuth, get direct access to the sources and facilities of the Beethoven-Haus and are supported by the staff and even the honorary members of the Beethoven-Haus Society. Among the mentees were chamber music ensembles as the Elias String Quartet (2013) and the Trio Rafaele (2015), soloists as the pianists Sunwook Kim (2013), Rafael Lipstein and Olga Pashchenko (2014), Karim Said (2015) and the cellist Jonas Palm (2015) so far. Furthermore, the Swiss musicologist Dominique Ehrenbaum could intensify his studies about fugues in Beethoven's late work (2013). In January 2014 the British artist Mark Alexander (painter) was commissioned by the Beethoven-Haus Society to paint a Beethoven portrait. Until spring 2015 the Villa Wasmuth was his studio, where he created a work cycle of five paintings after the famous Beethoven portrait by Joseph Karl Stieler. Credo II was donated to the Beethoven-Haus.

=== Music and museum education services ===
By offering guided tours for children, holiday workshops and afternoon activities at the museum, the Beethoven-Haus aims at reaching children and teenagers. Children who play an instrument meet several times a year at the chamber music hall to study and perform adaptations of Beethoven compositions. There are also concerts for children and various educational projects for elementary schools. Each year around 1,000 elementary school children visit the "scenic school concerts". In the 2011 competition "Kinder zum Olymp!", organised by the German cultural foundation "Kulturstiftung der Länder", an elementary school project dealing with Beethoven's house was awarded a prize in the final competition, and in the competition Kooperation. Konkret 2011 the same projekt won the first prize. In 2007 "Hello Beethoven", a special internet site for children was launched. The site contains information on topics such as Beethoven's family, his friends and school career, his daily routine, his illnesses, the social and political situation at that time and so on. It is recommended by the German central institution for political education for schools.

== Science and research ==
As described in its statute, the Beethoven-Haus fulfils the following purposes: collection and maintenance of manuscripts, pictures, original editions, early prints and publications related to Beethoven and his cultural environment; promotion of the Beethoven research by means of research projects, publications, congresses; organisation of exhibitions and museum-related events, production and distribution of publications and recordings of Beethoven compositions; support of musical performances and promotion of the international collaboration with research centres and other institutions dealing with Beethoven.

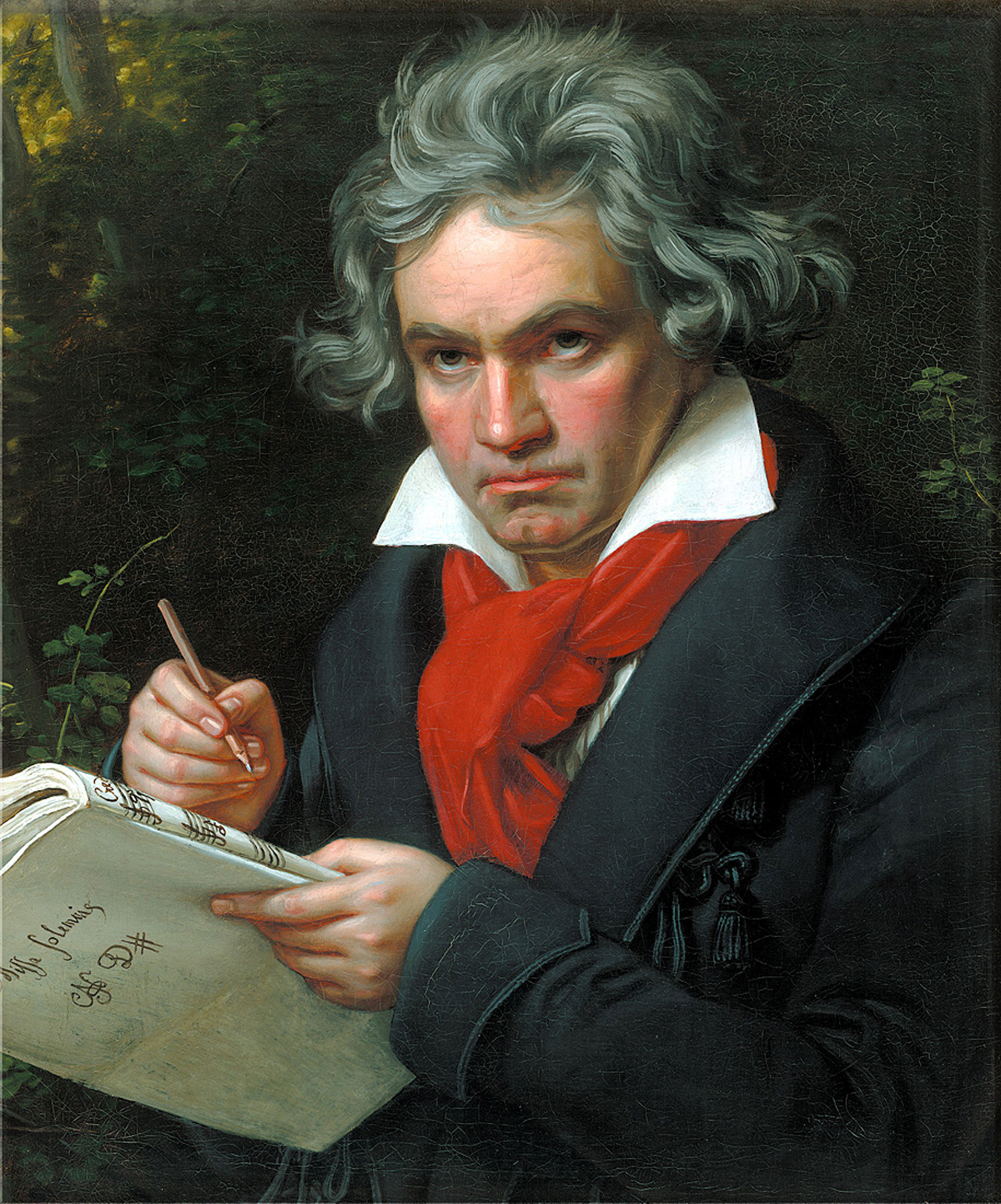
Beethoven holding the score of the Missa Solemnis

=== Beethoven collection ===
Among the duties of the Beethoven-Haus, the oldest one is collecting documents related to Beethoven. Within the 120 years of its existence, the Beethoven-Haus has established the largest and most diverse Beethoven collection. It comprises more than 1,000 original manuscripts (sketch sheets and sketch booklets, autographs, Beethoven-revised copies, conversation booklets, around 700 letters) as well as composition prints annotated by Beethoven, music instruments, memorabilia and items from Beethoven's daily life. The art collection consists of more than 3,000 pictures, paintings, photographs and sculptures, featuring among others three-quarters of all authentic Beethoven portraits, like for example the famous painting from Joseph Karl Stieler (1820). Thanks to gifts or permanent loans from private and public foundations and patrons the collection grows continuously. The most important new acquisitions of the last decade is the purchase of the engraver's copy of the Missa Solemnis (op. 123) in 2005 and the purchase of the original manuscript of the 33 variations on a waltz for piano by Anton Diabelli (op. 120) in December 2009. Air-conditioned and museum-appropriate rooms in the new building and a safe ensure that the precious documents are stored adequately. Every month the museum displays an object of the month.

=== Beethoven archive ===
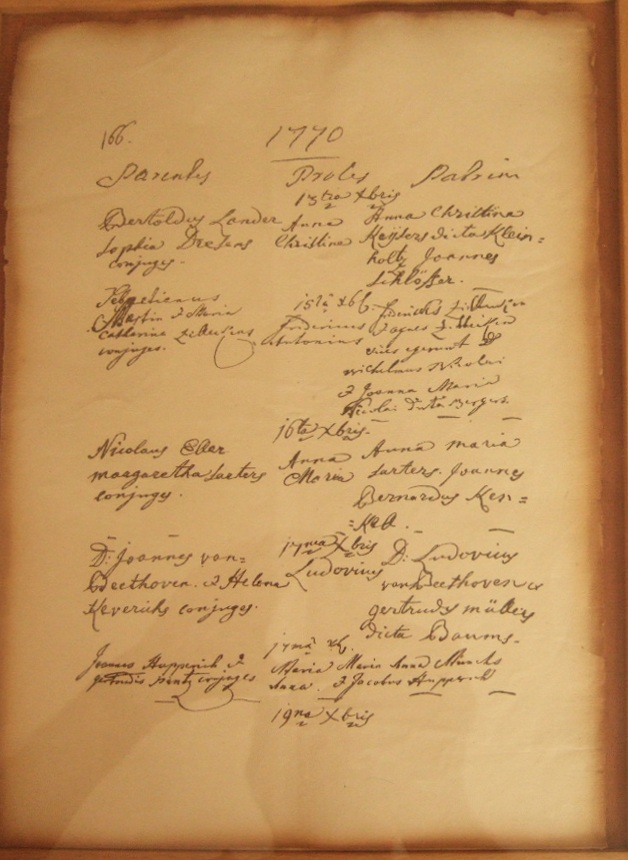
The baptism register at the Bonn Remigius church in Bonn showing the entry "Ludovicus van Beethoven" from 17 December 1770

The buildings next to the birthplace house the Beethoven archive, i.e. the scientific department of the institution. It was established on 26 March 1927 on the occasion of Beethoven's 100th anniversary as a foundation belonging to the Beethoven-Haus. Initially, it had its own administration and was closely related to the University of Bonn. Bonn music scientist Ludwig Schiedermair was initiator, founding member and served as director until 1945. Between 1945 and 1972 he was succeeded by Joseph Schmidt-Görg and Günther Massenkeil (1972–1974, as interim until 1976). All three were also professors at the seminar for the science of music. From 1976 until he went to the University of Göttingen Martin Staehelin held the position. In 1984, he was followed by Sieghard Brandenburg, who has also been head of department since 1998 as part of the new director position at the Beethoven-Haus. From 2003 to 2006 Ernst Herttrich was in charge of the Beethoven archive. He was also head of the complete edition since 1990 and head of the Beethoven-Haus publishing house since 1998. Since 1 January 2007 until March 2015, Bernhard R. Appel was head of archive and publishing house. He is followed by Christine Siegert.

The purpose of the Beethoven archive was mainly to create a centre for documentation on Beethoven's life, compositions and cultural environment. In order to reach that aim, a comprehensive Beethoven library was to be established along with all original editions of Beethoven's compositions and all preserved music manuscripts as photographic reproductions suitable to replace the original document for study purposes. These documents were to be complemented by facsimile reproductions of all certificates relevant for Beethoven's biography and his work and by a collection of all material needed to study Beethoven's art and time. The Beethoven archive as a hub of the Beethoven research was also deemed to be useful for the general interest in art. The collection now comprises over 11,000 autographs, music sheet, letters, documents, music prints and other sources from more than 200 libraries and archives. It is the foundation for philological research and edition. Besides, employees of the Beethoven-Haus regularly take part in international events concerning the research on Beethoven such as congresses and seminars.

=== Library ===
The archive's inventory is complemented with the literature and sheet music collection of the Beethoven-Haus library. In 1927 the collection became part of the archive, whereas the manuscript collection remained in the possession of the Beethoven-Haus association. The library primarily provides literature for the Beethoven-Haus and serves as a research library. To a lesser extent it is also an archive library with a proprietary source collection. The library's management is also responsible for indexing, the Digital Archive and the website of the Beethoven-Haus. As major collection items the library maintains original, first and early prints of compositions by Beethoven and other people from his environment, scientific literature published in form of essays or books, literature and magazines relating to a larger historic and cultural context as well as recordings. As such, the library not only documents Beethoven's compositions and their reception but also the composer's historic and personal environment. Apart from 50,000 books and essays, 160 magazines, 27,000 music items, among them 6,500 items of or relating to Beethoven, more than 11,000 image and microfilm records and 2,500 audio-visual media are available. Thanks to bequests, purchases and gifts from individuals (such as Herbert Grundmann, Hans Klingemann, Freiherr von Geyr, Hanns J. Eller, Dr. Klaus Steltmann) the library grew significantly. Among the most important collections are the one from Hans Conrad Bodmer, a Swiss physician and Beethoven collector who bequeathed more than 850 items to the Beethoven-Haus in 1956 as well as the collection of Franz Gerhard Wegeler, friend and biographer of Beethoven. It consists of over 400 items that were handed over to the Beethoven-Haus as a permanent loan in 1998. Furthermore, the library is in possession of several bequests, for example from Anton Schindler, Theodor von Frimmel and Max Unger. With an inventory of almost 100,000 media units containing biographical data the Beethoven-Haus library is now the largest public Beethoven-related library. Its reading room and reference library are popular with users from all over the world who enjoy working and studying at a historic quartet table at which Beethoven himself might have played.

=== Editions ===
==== Complete editions and facsimile editions ====
One of the tasks of the Beethoven-Haus is to assess and prepare the collection for scientific use. In light of the increasing number of different editions and questions on the interpretation of Beethoven's work, the need for a new complete edition grew. A complete edition published by Breitkopf & Härtel in Leipzig had already been available since 1863-1865/1888; however, it only contained the printed editions of Beethoven compositions known at that time. Compositions discovered since then or yet unprinted pieces (compositions without opus number) were not included in the old edition. Apart from that the entitlements to historic editions had changed. Delayed by the maelstrom of WW2, the G. Henle publishing house published in 1961 the first volume of the New Beethoven Edition that was begun in 1959. Until today it is the archive's most important scientific project. 56 volumes, divided into composition categories and instrumentation, are planned. The edition elaborated by the scientific staff of the Beethoven archive and internationally renowned music scientists is to identify the sheet music Beethoven intended but that is not always available in a clear form by comparing authentic sources, by justifying it in a critical report and publishing it on modern media. Besides working on the complete edition, the Beethoven archive staff is also reviewing the composition directory published by Georg Kinsky and Hans Halm in 1955. Publishing selected manuscripts as facsimile editions fulfils the intentions of the Beethoven-Haus founders: collect and maintain original documents, prepare them under scientific aspects and make them available for researchers and the public. Due to other tasks, the review was at first postponed but was started anew in 1953 under the direction of Joseph Schmidt-Görg and has since been continued by his successors. The publishing house not only publishes composition manuscripts and original editions such as the Waldstein Sonata (Op. 53), songs based on texts by Johann Wolfgang von Goethe or the Six bagatelles for piano (op. 126) but also written documents like letters (to, e.g. Josephine Countess Deym, née. v. Brunsvik, or to the Immortal Beloved), Beethoven's diary 1812–1818 or the register his Bonn friends gave the composer as a farewell gift upon his departure to Vienna in 1792.

==== Sketch research ====
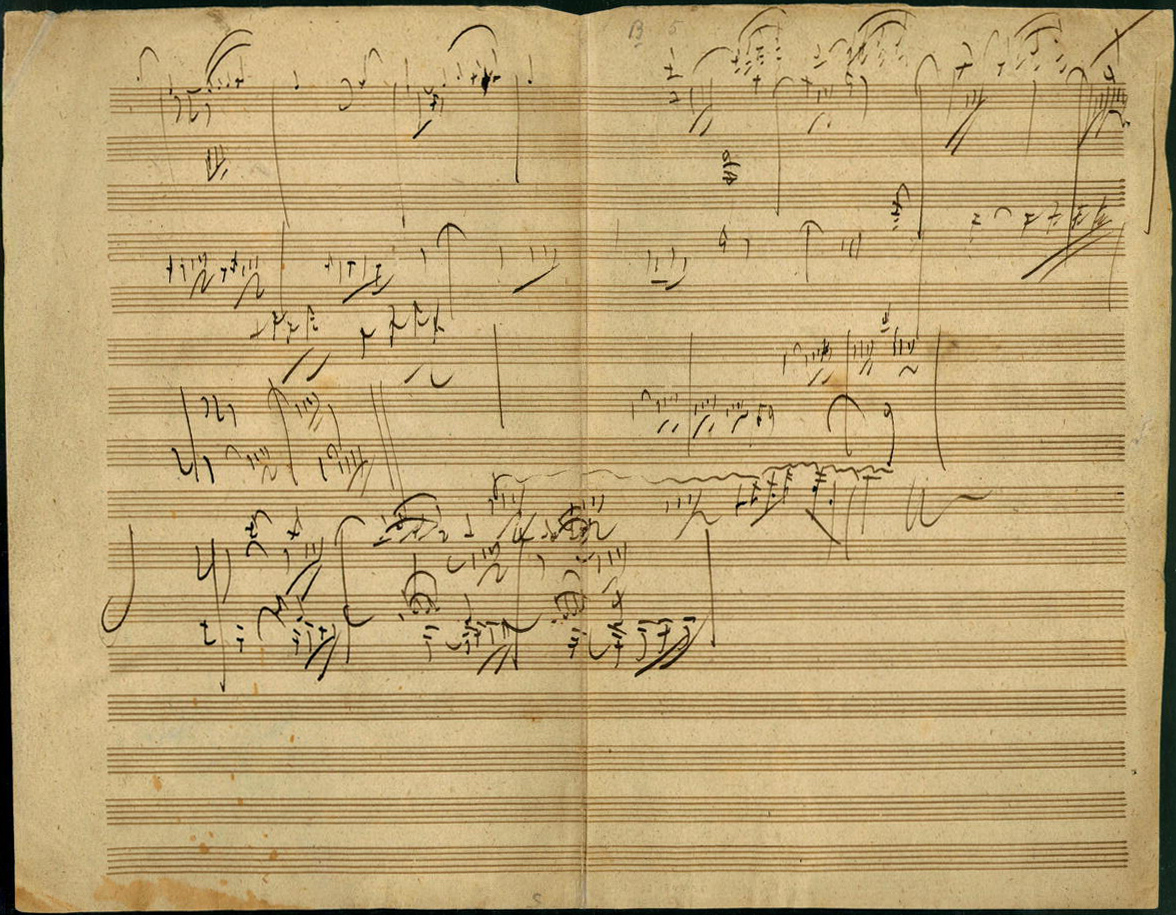
Sketches from Beethoven's piano sonata op. 101

A major area of the research on Beethoven that was generally neglected in music science but has been incorporated in the guidelines of the Beethoven archive in 1972 already is sketch research. In 1952 Joseph Schmidt-Görg founded an edition of scientifically reviewed and commented sketches and drafts by Beethoven for his compositions. Sieghard Brandenburg continued the series in 1972. The latest sketch edition volume was published in 2011.

==== Letters and conversation booklets ====
Under the direction of Sieghard Brandenburg the work on the initially planned complete edition of Beethoven's written correspondence was finally started. As Beethoven's handwriting is oftentimes hard to decipher and as the preserved letters are spread all over the world, this task constituted a particularly challenging endeavour. The six volumes (Letters 1783–1827) and a comprehensive register volume were also published by the G. Henle publishing house in 1996/1998. An eighth volume containing additional documents and registers is being prepared. Around 600 (half of them as audio letters) of the almost 2,300 letters are available at the Digital Archive in original form, featuring text transfers, content summaries and source descriptions. Already at the end of the 1920s Schiedermair pursued the plan to publish a complete edition of the conversation booklets, however first the Prussian, then later the German State Library revoked that plan and published the edition themselves between 1968 and 2001. At the moment eleven volumes are available; the series has, however, not been completed yet.

=== Publishing house / publication series ===
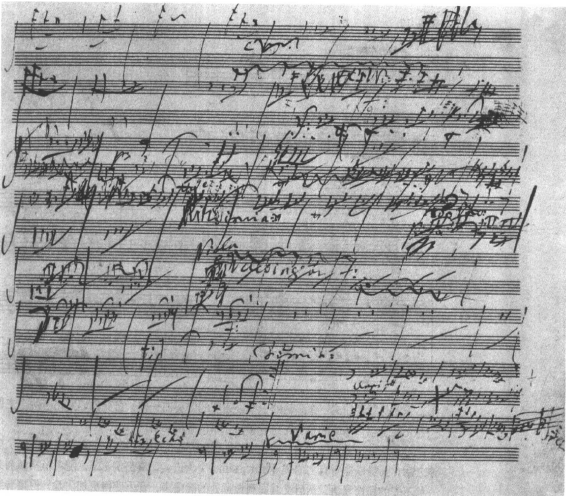
Pastoral Symphony

Publications stemming from the work of the Beethoven-Haus staff are published by the in-house publishing house. Many editions of the Beethoven archive are published as part of the various series the Beethoven-Haus publishes. The first series under the direction of Ludwig Schiedermair as editor counts ten volumes published between 1920 and 1934. Most of them are commented original documents from Beethoven with facsimile. The series also comprises monographs. After the war it continued under the name "Neue Folgen" (new series). The new series 1 containing sketches and drafts shows how relevant sketch research has always been deemed.[48] As part of series 2 the Beethoven-Jahrbuch (Beethoven Yearbook) was published in 1953/54 and 1973/81. In 1999 the yearbook was replaced by the annual publication Bonner Beethoven-Studien (Bonn Beethoven Studies) belonging to series 5. Apart from articles about sources and interpretations concerning Beethoven's life, his compositions and their reception these volumes also feature a review of the past year's activities of the Beethoven-Haus, the Beethoven archive and the publishing house. The 3rd series is dedicated to the facsimile editions. For the facsimile of the Pastoral Symphony (op. 68) (Vol. 14, 2000) and the facsimile edition of the Moonlight Sonata (op. 27,2) (Vol. 16, 2003) the publishing house was awarded the German Music Edition Prize. This prize was given for the publication "Beethoven im Bild" (2012) in 2013, too.

The 4th series on publications on Beethoven research contains congress reports, dissertations and monographs dealing with the research on Beethoven and research-related topics. Among the publications are several books about the composer's family and his dwellings, the reception of Beethoven compositions in France and the influence Beethoven had on the reception of early music. Other books deal with specific compositions, genres or interpretation issues. Today, the publishing house serves as a department of the Beethoven-Haus and publishes literature about the Beethoven research (the publications also contain contributions from external scientists), books for children and music aficionados as well as CDs. The publishing house closely co-operates with the G. Henle publishing house in Munich that publishes the large edition series on Beethoven's compositions and his written correspondence. In order to market and distribute its publications the Beethoven-Haus publishing house joined the Carus publishing house from Stuttgart in 2007.

=== Documentation and catalogues ===
All these publications and the remaining library inventory of literature, manuscripts, pictures, press articles, and recordings are listed in different catalogues. These are also available online. The library catalogue alone contains more than 800 biographical representations of Beethoven, work monographs, sketch and source studies, documents on performance procedures and organology, studies in music history, documents relating to Vienna and Bonn, bibliographical and lexical reference books, historic magazines, in particular of the 19th century, documents and studies on reception history and programme booklets in current European languages. The aim to capture everything was already abandoned for the press archive that now focuses on local history and the reception of Beethoven literature. Among the sheet music prints original editions (i.e. the first editions Beethoven himself ordered) and other singing voice or score editions published during the lifetime of the composer are given priority. The spectrum is complemented with editions by major editors or publishers, reviews, pocket scores and critical new editions from other publishing houses. Apart from Beethoven-related music items a collection featuring early prints of Beethoven's contemporary musicians is maintained. It also includes recordings of gramophone records and long-playing records, music tapes, CDs and Beethoven films. The focus is set on complete and rare recordings. The list of the captured items not only contains the title of the publication but also information on content, origin and a short description. This is especially helpful for older, rare or comprehensive publications, printed sheet music and sheet music manuscripts. Detailed indexing provides additional information and makes searching easier. A current project is the reconstruction of Beethoven's own library to determine the composer's mind and way of thinking. The list of the books and music items from that it is known that the composer read, studied, copied, excerpted, put to music, lent and borrowed, gave away or intended to buy would be very long. However, even Beethoven's core belongings, his own book and music sheet collection, are only known partially. Therefore, the project tries to determine them more closely and bring them together at the Beethoven-Haus. Librarians and scientists contribute their knowledge and antiquarians and private collectors sell their books granting special conditions. By adopting books, friends of the Beethoven-Haus can also support the endeavour.

=== Audio documentation ===
In order to let Beethoven's original instruments not only be heard in concerts, the Beethoven-Haus started a CD series. Renowned musicians such as Tabea Zimmermann, Daniel Sepec, the Schuppanzigh quartet, Jörg Demus and Andreas Staier perform compositions from Beethoven and his contemporaries on Beethoven's string instruments and pianofortes from Broadwood and Graf. Also documented herein are Pablo Casals's legendary visits at the Beethoven-Haus in 1955 and 1958 when he played on Beethoven's violoncello.

== Beethoven-Haus Bonn association ==
=== History and activities ===
Since Bonn was not interested in maintaining Beethoven's birthplace in 1888, twelve art-loving citizens and pensioners of Bonn founded the Beethoven-Haus association on 24 February 1889 (former legal form) and acquired the property to turn it into a memorial. They aimed not only at reconstructing the birthplace "as it was when Beethoven was young" but also at setting up a collection comprising all his compositions as manuscripts and printed editions, his letters, pictures and other beloved items as well as all literature about him, i.e. everything that allows the recipient to explore the composer. Their intention was to acquire the house and maintain it as a memorial site. They paid 57,000 mark for the house; the refurbishing costs amounted to additional 24,000 mark. To support their project the founding members gained a number of famous people as honorary members, among them politicians, artists and scientists. Examples include Reich Chancellor von Bismarck, Count von Moltke, Johannes Brahms, Clara Schumann, Max Bruch, and Giuseppe Verdi.

By 1890, the association had 344 members, a quarter of them abroad, among them 35 Britons and 11 Americans. Violinist Joseph Joachim (1831–1907), known for his interpretation of Beethoven's violin concert in D major (op. 61) and who together with his Joachim quartet contributed significantly to the success of Beethoven's string quartets, served as honorary president. In 1890 the association established the Beethoven-Haus chamber music festivals that are held every two years. Charity concerts under the direction of Joseph Joachim and supported by renowned musicians raised enough money to maintain the buildings and pay for the association's activities. During the first of these chamber music festivals, the largest-ever Beethoven exhibition took place, showing 360 items on loan from all over Europe.

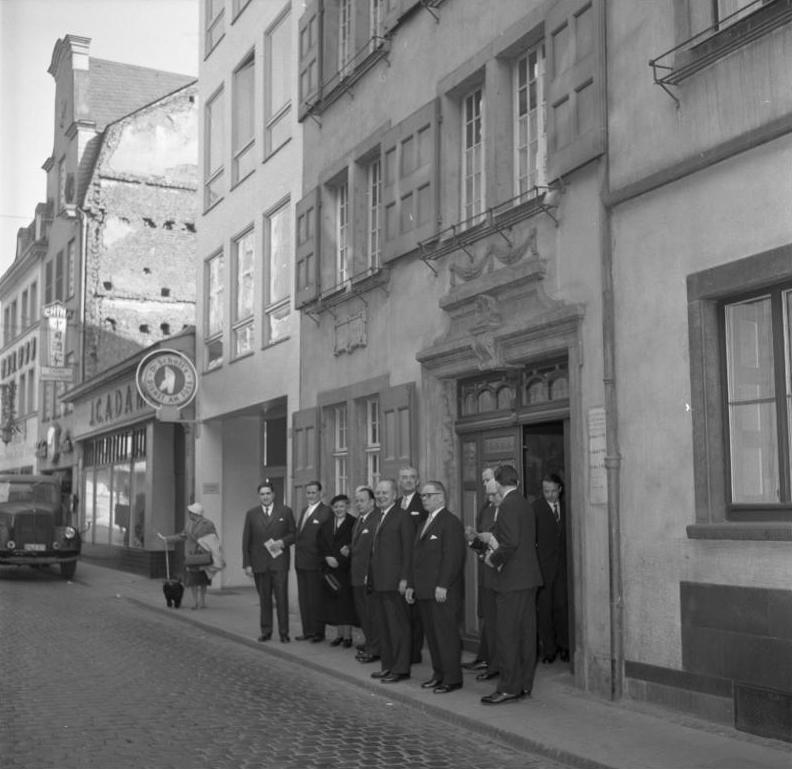
Politicians from Finland visit the Beethoven-Haus on 15 March 1960

On 10 May 1893, during the second chamber music festival, the Beethoven-Haus was opened as a memorial site and museum for Beethoven's life, work and impact. The statute from 1896 describes its purposes as follows: Maintain the memory of Ludwig van Beethoven by means of a museum and a collection, events, musical performances, prizes and scholarships, as well as Beethoven-Haus publications. In the following decades the association was quite busy organising chamber music festivals (30 festivals until 1956) and establishing the collection. In order to complement the museum- and music-related activities, the research on Beethoven was gradually intensified. On the occasion of the 150th anniversary of Beethoven's birthday in 1920 the association started a proprietary series of scientific publications. In 1927, on the 100th anniversary of the composer's death, the Beethoven archive was founded. It serves as a pillar for the research on Beethoven. Accordingly, the post-war statute includes "Maintenance of memory and work". In 2004 the list of purposes and duties was reviewed and elaborated, also assumed in 2013. On its 100th anniversary in 1989 the Beethoven-Haus association moved into a new building, accommodating rooms for archive and offices as well as a chamber music hall. Several times, the activities of the Beethoven-Haus were criticised by the public. Critics regarded the state of the museum at Beethoven's actual birthplace as not up-to-date and obsolete. Nevertheless, as part of the 2006 initiative "Invest in Germany – Land of Ideas", former German president Horst Köhler awarded the Beethoven-Haus a prize for its innovative combination of museum, research site and new media.

=== Organisational structure ===
The Beethoven-Haus association was turned into a legal entity in 1896. It comprises the general meeting of its members and the voluntary board of directors. In line with its tradition the board of directors includes between 5 and 12 persons selected by the members. The chairman, secretary, and treasurer, and the director of the Beethoven-House as chief executive officer, are also members of the board of directors. The director of the Beethoven-Haus, who is appointed by the board of directors, presides over the administration, conducts active business and is responsible for the association's facilities and projects. In 1998 a separate position was established to oversee the different departments. Andreas Eckhardt (until 2009) was named director. He was succeeded by Philipp Adlung (until 2010) and Manfred Harnischfeger. Since May 2012 Malte Boecker serves as director of the Beethoven-House. Apart from the director position, there is a committee for the promotion of the association and its purposes. That committee includes the chairman, secretary and treasurer and the director as advisers, and a representative of each responsible level of government (German federal government, federal state of North Rhine-Westphalia, regional authority of the Rhineland and the city of Bonn). Chairmen of the association:

- 1889 until 1903 Carl Alfred Ebbinghaus (1833–1911)
- February 1903 until December 1903 Max von Sandt (1861–1918)
- 1903 until 1912 Dittmar Finkler (1852–1912)
- March 1912 until 1923 Ernst Zitelmann (1852–1923)
- 1923 until 1929 Ferdinand August Schmidt (1852–1929)
- 1929 until 1932 Friedrich Knickenberg (1863–1932)
- February 1932 until 1945 Ludwig Schiedermair (1876–1957).

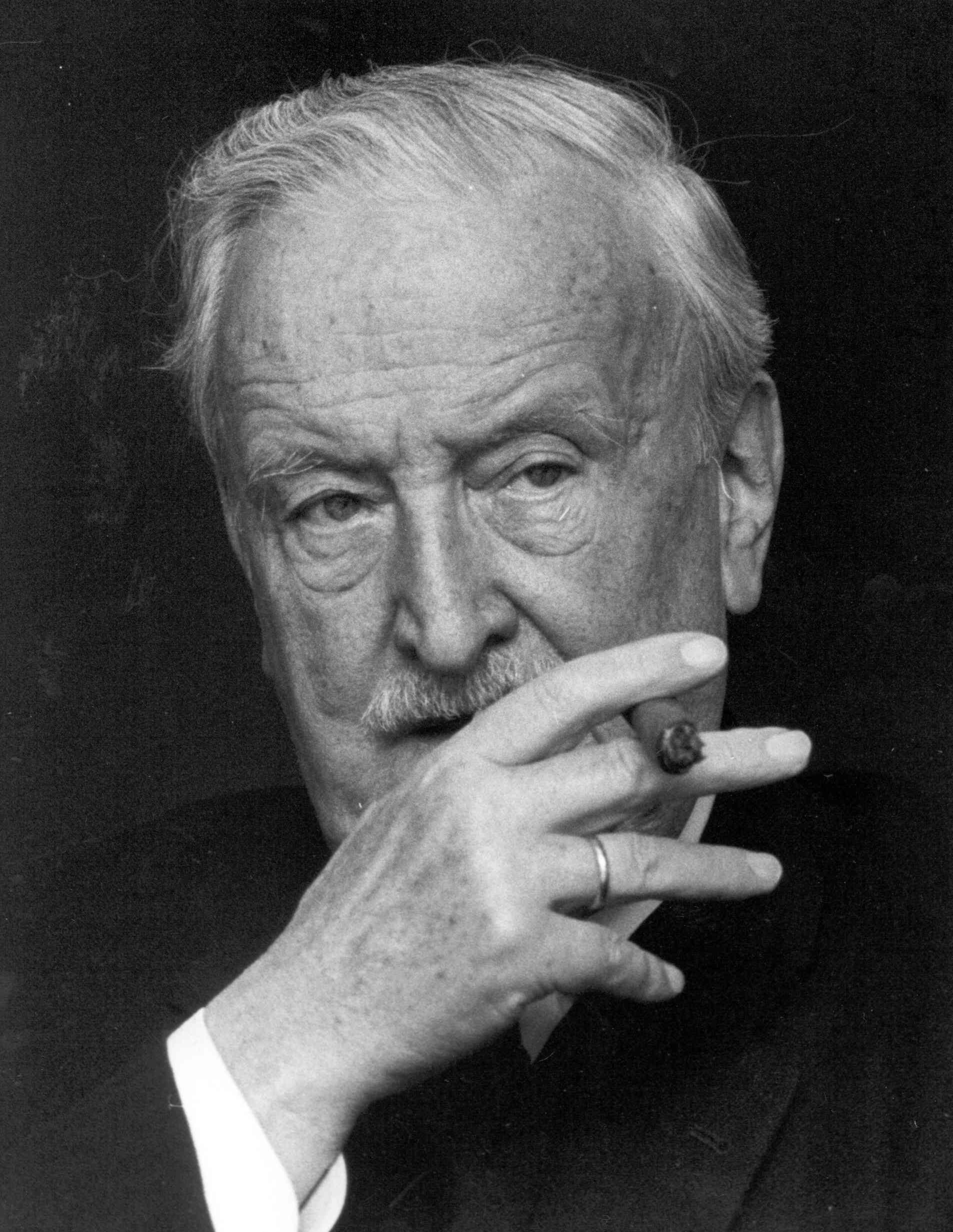
Hermann Josef Abs in the 1970s

On 7 May 1945 an administrative council was established alongside the management of the association upon request of the military government.

- 1945 until 1960 Theodor Wildeman (1885–1963)
- 1960 until 1994 Hermann Josef Abs (1901–1994)
- 1994 until 2004 Friedrich Wilhelm Christians (1922–2004)
- 2004 until 2012 Kurt Masur (1927–2015)
- since 2012 Tabea Zimmermann.

The election of conductor Kurt Masur as chairman revived the former tradition of having an artist as chairman. In 2012 this tradition continued with famous violist Tabea Zimmermann. From the beginning on, the association consisted of members of all classes of society, providing various areas of expertise. Today, the association has about 1,000 members. Numerous prominent figures of the music scene were and are still awarded honorary memberships. Around half of its funds stem from the public authorities (federal German government, state of North Rhine-Westphalia, city of Bonn); the other 50 percent is obtained through donations and sponsors, activities run by the association, and project-related funds from third parties such as foundations and other promotional institutions. The non-profit Beethoven-Haus Bonn Foundation, founded in 1999, supports projects of the Beethoven-Haus solely from its interest income. Capital contributors to the foundation are given honorary titles such as "Patron", "Donor" or "Founder". Revenue-focused institutions and activities like the museum shop and the granting of image usage rights were outsourced to the Beethoven-Haus Vertriebsgesellschaft mbH. Their revenue goes into the publicly supported budget.

== See also ==
- Ira F. Brilliant Center for Beethoven Studies
- List of music museums

== Literature ==
- Joseph Schmidt-Görg: Katalog der Handschriften des Beethoven-Hauses und des Beethoven-Archivs Bonn. Bonn 1935.
- Sieghard Brandenburg: "Sammeln und Bewahren – Edieren und Auswerten. Aus der Gründungszeit des Beethoven-Archivs". in: Bonner Beethoven-Studien. Beethoven-Haus, Bonn 5.2006, p. 71–93.
- Michael Ladenburger, Franz Josef Talbot und Silke Bettermann: Das Ensemble Beethoven-Haus in Bonn. (Rheinische Kunststätten, Nr. 510). Neusser Druckerei und Verlag, Neuss 2008, ISBN 978-3-86526-033-8.
- Silke Bettermann, Walther Brauneis und Michael Ladenburger: "Von der Bonngasse ins Schwarzspanierhaus". Beethoven-Häuser in alten Ansichten (publications of Beethoven-Haus, exhibition catalogues, vol. 11), corrected ed.. Verlag Beethoven-Haus, Bonn 2005. ISBN 3-88188-066-6.
- Joseph Schmidt-Görg: Beethoven. Die Geschichte seiner Familie. (publications of Beethovenhaus in Bonn, NF, 4th series, vol. 1). Verlag Beethoven-Haus, Bonn / G. Henle-Verlag, München-Duisburg 1964.
- Familie Beethoven im kurfürstlichen Bonn. Neuauflage nach den Aufzeichnungen des Bonner Bäckermeisters Gottfried Fischer. Übertragen, kommentiert, illustriert und herausgegeben von Margot Wetzstein, Verlag Beethoven-Haus, Bonn 2006. ISBN 3-88188-098-4.
- Theodor Wildeman: "Die Instandsetzung von Beethovens Geburtshaus und der Umbau des Beethovenarchivs in Bonn in den Jahren 1935–37". In: Jahrbuch der Rheinischen Denkmalpflege, vols. 14–15 (1938), p. 540–545.
- Ortwin Wildeman: "Das Beethovenhaus Bonn am 11. Mai 1945". Zur Erinnerung an Theodor Wildeman und Heinrich Hasselbach. In: Bonner Geschichtsblätter 49/50, Bonn 1999/2000 (2001), p. 491–498.
- Herbert Grundmann (ed.): Verein Beethoven-Haus Bonn 1889–1964. Verlag Beethoven-Haus, Bonn 1964.
- 1889–1989. Verein Beethoven-Haus. [Festschrift zum 100jährigen Bestehen]. Verlag Beethoven-Haus, Bonn 1989.
- [Verein Beethoven-Haus (ed.)]: Neue Satzungen, Inventar des Museums, Verzeichnis der Mitglieder des Vereins Beethoven-Haus in Bonn. Universitäts-Buchdruckerei von Carl Georgi, Bonn 1898.
- Ferdinand August Schmidt: Beethoven-Haus. Die Gründung des Vereins Beethoven-Haus und die Geschichte der beiden ersten Jahrzehnte seiner Tätigkeit. Nach meinen Erinnerungen, Aufzeichnungen und urkundlichem Material zusammengestellt. Bonn 1928 (als Manuskript gedruckt).
- Andreas Eckhardt: The / Das / La Beethoven-Haus Bonn. Verlag Beethoven-Haus, Bonn 2008, ISBN 978-3-88188-112-8.
- Ludwig Finscher: "Rückblick nach vorn". Musikalische Denkmäler und Musikleben. In: Bonner Beethoven-Studien. 6 (2007), ISBN 978-3-88188-110-4, p. 189–196.
- Friederike Grigat: "Die Bibliothek des Beethoven-Archivs in Bonn". In: Forum Musikbibliothek. 21 (2000), p. 53–57.
