= Ludwig Schiedermair =

German minister and musicologist

Ludwig Ferdinand Schiedermair
- Born: December 7, 1876; Regensburg, Germany
- Died: April 30, 1957; Bensberg, Germany
- Education: Studied musicology in Munich
- Occupations: Minister, Musicologist
- Employer: University of Bonn
- Known for: Opera history, Mozart, Beethoven
- Notable work: First complete critical edition of the letters of Mozart and his family (1914)
- Title: Professor

Ludwig Ferdinand Schiedermair (7 December 1876, in Regensburg – 30 April 1957, in Bensberg) was a German minister and musicologist. He concerned himself with opera history, Mozart, and Beethoven. In 1914 he edited the first complete critical edition of the letters of Mozart and his family.

== Life ==
After studying musicology in Munich and habilitation as a docent in Marburg he became a professor at the University of Bonn from 1920 to 1945. As department head for music history he founded the Beethoven Archive at the Beethoven House, Bonn, on 26 March 1927 (the 100th anniversary of Beethoven's death) and served as its first director until 1945. He also founded the Institute for Musicology at the University of Bonn – the first such institute at a German school for higher education. He also served on the committee to found the Max-Reger-Institute which he led until 1953.

After the rise of the Nazi Party, he published his work The complete world view ideas in the Volk's music of Beethoven in 1934. From 1937 to 1939 he served as president of the German Society for Musicology, and in this position gave the musicological address of the Reichsmusiktage on 27 May 1938, a work of propaganda famous for its exhibition of "Degenerate music." In 1936 he earned the Cultural Prize of Bonn and the Beethoven Medal of Bonn, and in 1948 he won the Golden Medal of the Salzburg Mozarteum. In the Second World War, he worked for the Reichsleiter Rosenberg Taskforce.

He retired in 1945 and in 1952 became an honored member of the Academy for Music Research.

== Publications ==
- Der Junge Beethoven, Leipzig 1925; reprinted Hildesheim 1978.
- Die deutsche Oper, Leipzig 1930. Second Expanded edition, Bonn 1940, 3rd revised edition, Bonn 1943.
- Die Gestaltung weltanschaulicher Ideen in der Volksmusik Beethovens, 1934.
