= Martin Staehelin =

Swiss musicologist and music historian

Martin Staehelin (25 September 1937 - 23 June 2025 in Göttingen) was a Swiss musicologist and university lecturer.

== Life ==
Born in Basel, Staehelin first studied ancient languages, history, school music and flute. In 1967, he received his doctorate in musicology and ancient languages as minor subjects.

After his Zurich habilitation on the composer Heinrich Isaac, Staehelin first became director of the Beethoven Archive and Beethoven House in Bonn before being appointed professor of musicology at the University of Göttingen in 1983.

In 2013, he gave the laudation for the award of the Lichtenberg Medal to Joshua Rifkin.

== Other roles ==
- Since 1987: Member of the philological-historical class of the Göttingen Academy of Sciences and Humanities
- Since 1993: Honorary director of the Johann Sebastian Bach Institute in Göttingen
- Since 1993: Member of the Academia Europaea in London
- Since 1998: Member of the advisory board of the Prussian Cultural Heritage Foundation in Berlin

== Publications ==
- Die mittelalterliche Musik-Handschrift W1: Vollständige Reproduktion des 'Notre Dame'-Manuskripts der Herzog August Bibliothek Wolfenbüttel Cod. Guelf. 628 Helmst. Wolfenbütteler Mittelalter-Studien 9. Harrassowitz, Wiesbaden 1995, ISBN 3-447-03779-2.
- Ein unbekannter Brief von Ulrich von Wilamowitz-Moellendorff an Felix Staehelin über die 'Geschichte der kleinasiatischen Galater'. In: Klio. volume 76 (1994), pp. 454–467
- Musikwissenschaft und Musikpflege an der Georg-August-Universität Göttingen: Beiträge zu ihrer Geschichte. Göttingen: Vandenhoeck & Ruprecht, 1987. ISBN 3-525-35832-6. 200 pages.
- "Pierre de La Rue," in The New Grove Dictionary of Music and Musicians, ed. Stanley Sadie. 20 vol. London, Macmillan Publishers Ltd., 1980. ISBN 1-56159-174-2
- Die Messen Heinrich Isaacs: Quellenstudien zu Heinrich Isaac und seinem Messen-Oeuvre. 3 vols, Publikationen der Schweizerischen Musikforschenden Gesellschaft. Bern - Stuttgart: Haupt, 1977.
