= Hermann Josef Abs =

German banker and advisor

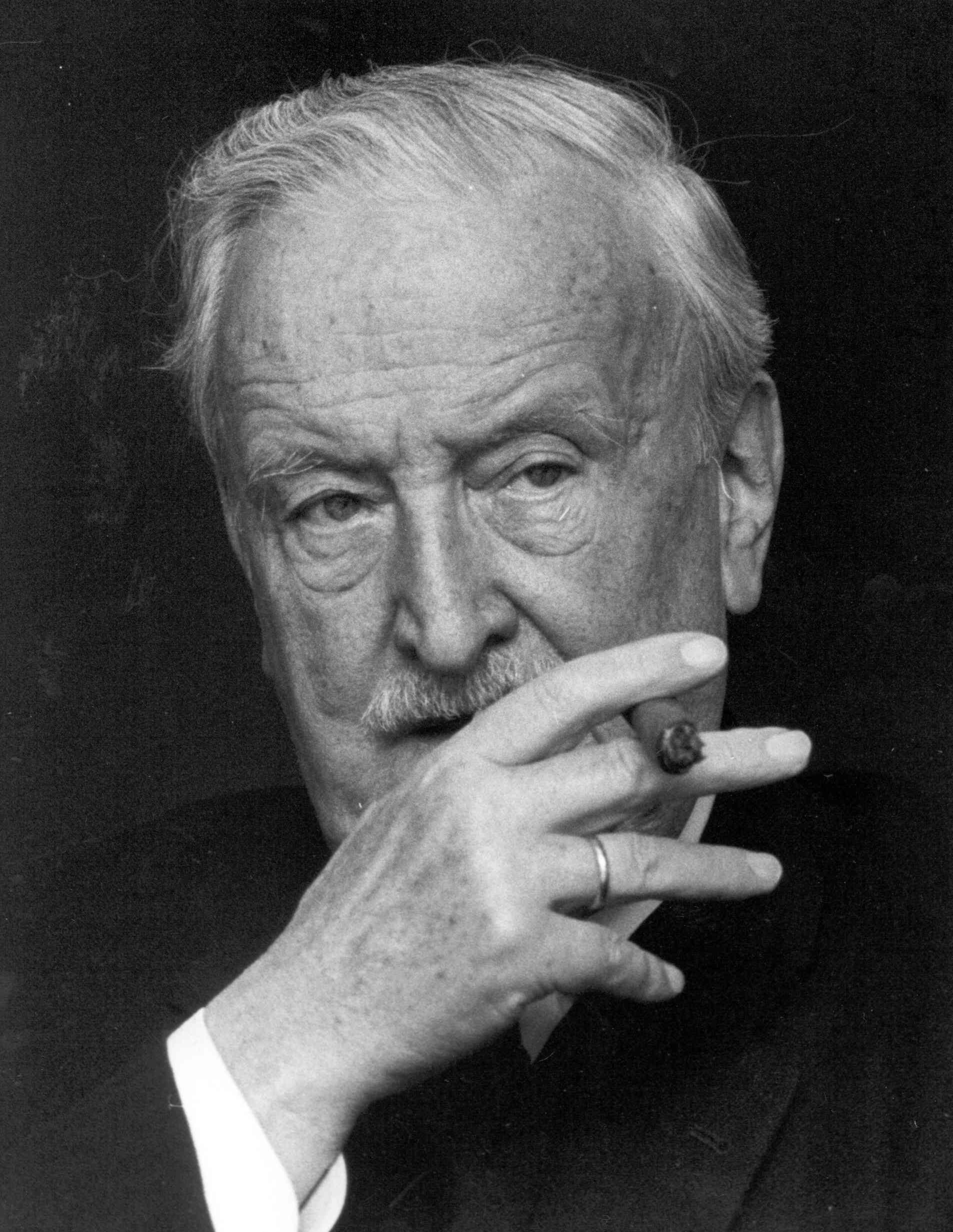
Hermann Josef Abs.

Hermann Josef Abs (15 October 1901, Bonn – 5 February 1994, Bad Soden) was a leading banker during the Nazi regime, and advisor to Chancellor Adenauer. He was a member of the board of directors of Deutsche Bank from 1938 to 1945, as well as of 44 other companies, including IG Farben. As the most powerful commercial banker of the Third Reich, he was, according to economic journalist Adam LeBor, "the lynchpin of the continent wide plunder". The Allies arrested him in January 1946; however, British intervention got him freed after three months, and German courts later dropped all charges.

He was chairman of Deutsche Bank, and contributed to the reconstruction of the German economy. He chaired the German credit facility that distributed the counterpart funds created by the Marshall Plan. Working closely with Chancellor Konrad Adenauer, he was a leader in rebuilding heavy industry, and helped draft the investment policy for basic industries in 1952. He played a major diplomatic role in resolving the prewar German debts at the London War Debt Agreement of 1953. In 1953 he negotiated the restitution to Israel and individual Jews for the Holocaust.

== Controversies about WWII role ==
In 1974, the artist Hans Haacke revealed the supposed role of Abs with the Nazi regime in a project for the exhibition Manet-PROJEKT '74' which detailed, in ten panels, the ownership history of Édouard Manet's Bunch of Asparagus (1880). The Wallraf-Richartz Museum rejected the Haacke display.

In 1995, studies of the Deutsche Bank archives by Harold James show that, while the DB helped the Nazi in different variating degrees, direct and indirectly, there has various links between Abs and anti-Nazi resistance during the war, while Abs decided not direct participate in resistance organized acts, he went to various secret meetings and such links were described as something that made James "astounded".

After the war, he participated in the restitution to Israel and individual Jews for the Holocaust.

== Other sources ==
- Hermann J. Abs, in Encyclopædia Britannica online
- Obituary: Hermann Abs
- Newspaper clippings about Hermann Josef Abs in the 20th Century Press Archives of the ZBW
