= Mass in C major (Beethoven) =

1807 Mass by Ludwig van Beethoven

- by Ludwig van Beethoven
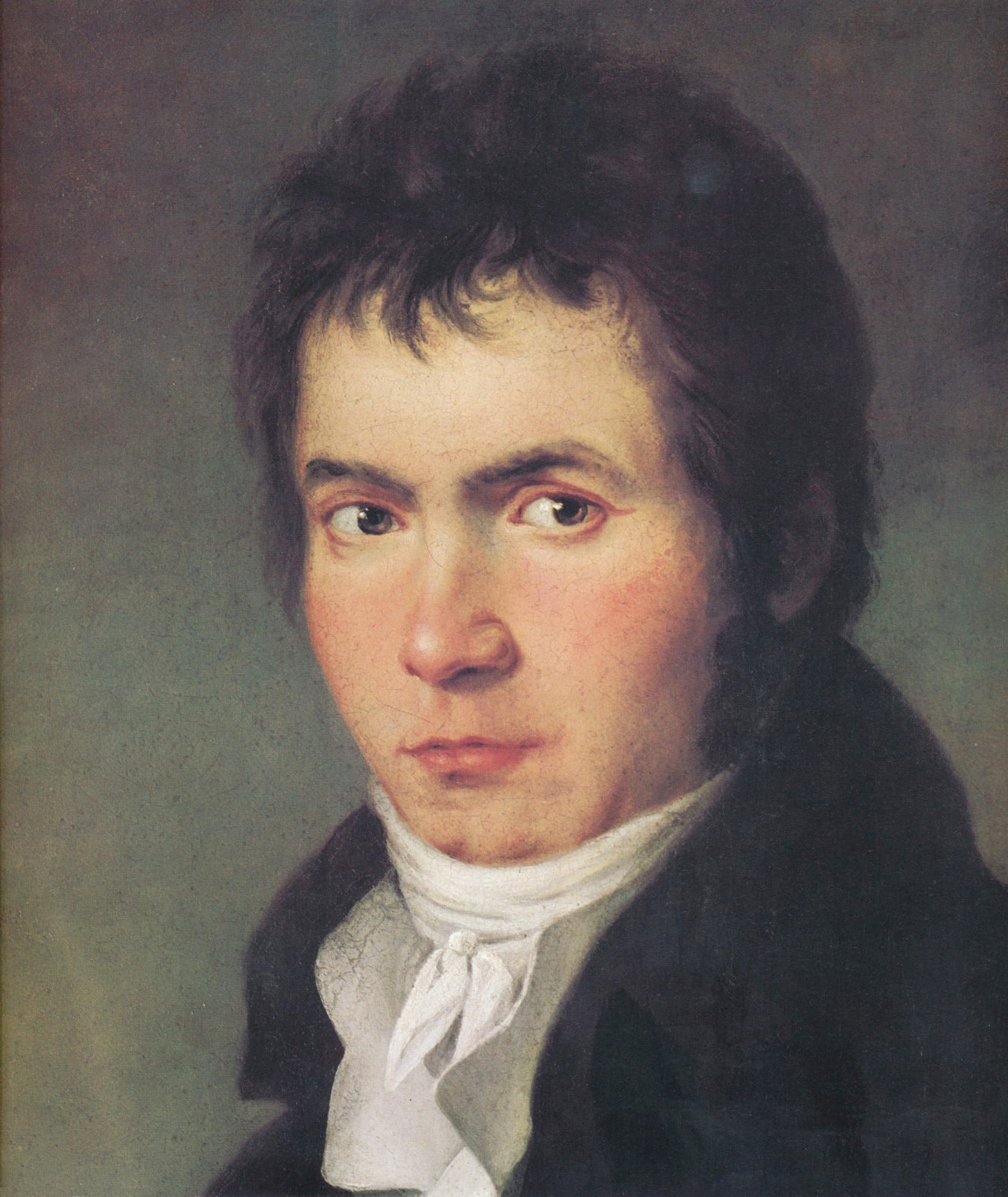
- Beethoven around 1805, detail of a portrait by Joseph Willibrord Mähler
- Key: C major
- Opus: 86
- Text: Mass ordinary; German version by Christian Schreiber
- Dedication: Prince Esterházy; Prince Kinsky
- Performed: 13 September 1807: Eisenstadt
- Published: 1812: Leipzig
- Publisher: Breitkopf & Härtel
- Scoring: soloists; choir; orchestra

Ludwig van Beethoven composed the Mass in C major, Op. 86, to a commission from Prince Nikolaus Esterházy II in 1807. The mass, scored for four vocal soloists, choir and orchestra, was premiered that year by the Prince's musical forces in Eisenstadt. Beethoven performed parts of it in his 1808 concert featuring the premieres of four major works including his Fifth Symphony. The mass was published in 1812 by Breitkopf & Härtel.

Both the Prince and contemporary critic E. T. A. Hoffmann were generally displeased by the work, though the latter still considered it "entirely worthy of the great master [because of its] inner structure [and] intelligent orchestration". The work has since been overshadowed by the later and better known Missa solemnis, though critics such as Michael Moore have noted the Mass in C major's superiority in "directness and an emotional content".

== History and composition ==
Beethoven had studied counterpoint in Vienna with Johann Georg Albrechtsberger, an authority in the field, but had not turned to sacred music until late in his career. He received a commission from Prince Nikolaus Esterházy II in 1807, extending a tradition established by Joseph Haydn, who for decades had served as the family's Kapellmeister (music director). Following his return from England in 1795, Haydn had composed one mass per year for the Esterházy family, to celebrate the name day of the Prince's wife, Princess Maria Josepha Esterházy. Haydn had ceased this tradition with the failure of his health in 1802. Beethoven was fully aware of the tradition that Haydn had established and it influenced him strongly in writing the Mass in C major. Beethoven confessed in a letter to the prince: "may I just say that I will hand the mass over to you with great trepidation, as Your Serene Highness is accustomed to having the inimitable masterworks of the great Haydn performed." The musicologist Lewis Lockwood wrote:

On accepting the prince's commission Beethoven had praised Haydn's masses, calling them "inimitable masterpieces". Beethoven meant it. He clearly studied Haydn's masses while composing his own, no doubt for reasons far beyond the fact that the Esterházys had commissioned it, as we see from his sketches for the Gloria. The sketches include two passages copied from the Gloria of Haydn's Schöpfungsmesse (Creation Mass), one of four late Haydn masses easily available to Beethoven in published editions.

=== Premiere and performance ===
Beethoven's mass was premiered on 13 September 1807 by the Prince's own musical forces in Eisenstadt, the ancestral seat of the Esterházys not far from Vienna. It is not known what building housed the performance, but the two likely candidates are the Bergkirche, which had hosted a number of the Haydn premieres, and the chapel of the Prince's principal residence, Schloss Esterházy.

The first performance was underrehearsed; musicologist Fred Stoltzfus described the dress rehearsal as "unsatisfactory", noting that only one of the five altos in the chorus was present. The premiere was not well received, particularly by the man who commissioned it, Prince Esterházy. Lockwood narrated the episode, reporting an anecdote

According to the story, the prince, after hearing the work—and probably noticing its stark difference from the styles of Mass composition he revered in Haydn—said to Beethoven, "But, my dear Beethoven, what is that you have done again?" Whereupon, continues the story, the court chapel master was heard to laugh—this being none other than Johann Nepomuk Hummel, the composer and pianist who had himself written masses for the Esterházy court, including one in the same key, C major, just the previous year. Reacting angrily to the prince's question and furious over Hummel's pompous laughter as well as the inferior guest quarters he had been given in Eisenstadt, Beethoven left in a huff.

Charles Rosen called the episode Beethoven's "most humiliating public failure". The prince had perhaps muted his reactions in directly addressing Beethoven, as in a later letter to the Countess Henriette von Zielinska he went so far as to say, "Beethoven's mass is unbearably ridiculous and detestable, and I am not convinced that it can ever be performed properly. I am angry and mortified." (Note: Translation from Theodore Albrecht (1996) Letters to Beethoven and Other Correspondence: 1824–1828. University of Nebraska Press, p. 194. Esterházy wrote in French, saying, La Messe de Beethoven est insuportablement ridicule et détestable, je ne suis pas convaincu qu’elle puisse même paroitre honêtement: j’en suis coleré et honteux.; original cited in Herttrich 2010, p. iv)

Beethoven conducted parts of the mass, the Gloria and the Sanctus, in a concert on 22 December 1808, which featured the public premieres of his Symphony No. 5, Symphony No. 6, Piano Concerto No. 4 and Choral Fantasy.

=== Publication ===
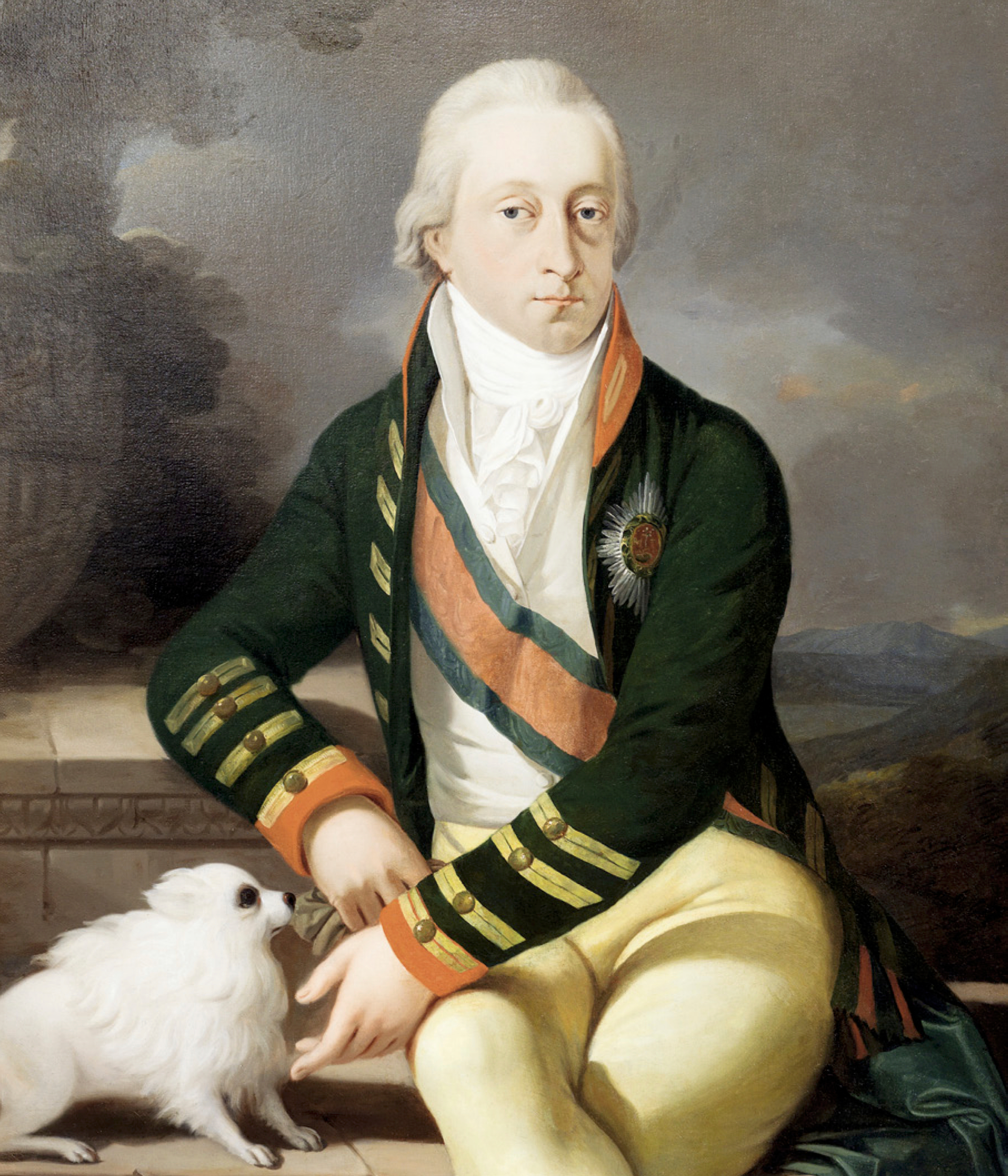
Nikolaus II Esterházy, who commissioned the mass and arranged its premiere; portrait by Joseph Lanzedelly the Elder, 1803

Beethoven offered the mass, after revising the composition, to the publisher Breitkopf & Härtel, together with the Fifth and Sixth Symphonies. Originally, the mass had been dedicated to Prince Esterházy; this dedication appears on the manuscript score used at the premiere. Perhaps unsurprisingly, given the outcome of the first performance and the Prince's reaction, Beethoven dedicated the published version (1812) to another person, Prince Kinsky. The first publication consisted of a printed score with handwritten copies of orchestral parts on request.

The publisher sent Beethoven an alternative German text by Christian Schreiber, about which Beethoven commented on 16 January 1811: "The translation of the Gloria seems to fit well to me, but to the Kyrie not so well, although the beginning tief im Staub anbeten wir [deep in dust we worship] fits very well; yet it seems to me in some expressions such as ew’gen Weltenherrscher [eternal ruler of the world] Allgewaltigen [omnipotent] are more suitable for the Gloria. The general character ... in the Kyrie is heartfelt resignation, from where the depth of religious feelings Gott erbarme dich unser [God have mercy upon us] without, however, being sad, gentleness is the basis of the whole work, ... although eleison have mercy upon us – yet there is cheerfulness in the whole. The Catholic goes to his church on Sundays bedecked with festive cheerfulness. The Kyrie Eleison is likewise the introduction to the whole mass; with such strong expressions little remains over for the places where they should really be strong." (Note: The original is as follows (in Beethoven's spelling, including some ellipses): die Übersezung zum gloria scheint mir sehr gut zu paßen zum Kyrie nicht so gut obwohlen der Anfang 'tief im Staub anbeten wir' sehr gut paßt, so scheint mir doch bey manchen Ausdrücken wie 'ew’gen Weltenherrscher' 'Allgewaltigen' Mehr zum gloria tauglich. der allgemeine charakter ... in dem Kyrie ist innige Ergebung, woher innigkeit religiöser Gefühle 'Gott erbarme dich unser' ohne deswegen Traurig zu seyn, sanftheit liegt dem Ganzen zu Grunde, ... obwohlen 'eleison erbarme dich unser' – so ist doch heiterkeit im Ganzen, Der Katholike tritt sonntags geschmückt festlich Heiter in seine Kirche das Kyrie Eleison ist gleichfalls die Introdukzion zur ganzen Messe, bey so starken ausdrücken würde wenig übrig bleiben für da, wo sie wirklich stark seyn Müßen.)

== Structure and scoring ==
The composition is scored for four soloists (soprano, alto, tenor, bass), a four-part choir (SATB), and a symphony orchestra of flutes, oboes, clarinets, bassoons, horns, trumpets, timpani, strings and organ. The setting of the Latin Order of Mass is structured in five movements. In the following table of the movements, the voices, markings, keys and time signatures are taken from the score.

No.	Part	Incipit	Vocal forces	Marking	Key	Time
1	Kyrie	Kyrie	S, A, T, B soli + chorus (SATB)	Andante con moto assai vivace quasi Allegretto ma non troppo	C major	2/4
2	Gloria	Gloria	T solo + chorus (SATB)	Allegro con brio	C major	cut time
2	Gloria	Qui tollis peccata mundi	A solo + chorus (SATB)	Andante mosso	F minor	3/4
2	Gloria	Quoniam tu solus sanctus	S, A, T, B soli + chorus (SATB)	Allegro ma non troppo	C major	common time
3	Credo	Credo	chorus (SATB)	Allegro con brio	C major	3/4
3	Credo	Et incarnatus est	S, A, T, B soli + chorus (SATB)	Adagio	E♭ major	2/4
3	Credo	Et resurrexit	B solo + chorus (SATB)	Allegro	C major	common time
3	Credo	Et in Spiritum Sanctum	S, A, T, B soli + chorus (SATB)	Allegro	C major	common time
3	Credo	Et vitam venturi saeculi	S, A, T, B soli + chorus (SATB)	Allegro ma non troppo	C major	cut time
4	Sanctus	Sanctus	Chorus (SATB)	Adagio	A major	common time
4	Sanctus	Pleni sunt coeli, Osanna	Chorus (SATB)	Allegro	A major	common time
4	Sanctus	Benedictus	S, A, T, B soli + chorus (SATB)	Allegretto ma non troppo	F major	common time
4	Sanctus	Osanna	Chorus (SATB)	Allegro	A major	common time
5	Agnus Dei	Agnus Dei	Chorus (SATB)	Poco Andante	C minor	12/8
5	Agnus Dei	Dona nobis pacem	S, A, T, B soli + chorus (SATB)	Allegro ma non troppo	C major	common time
5	Agnus Dei	Dona nobis pacem	Chorus (SATB)	Andante con moto, Tempo del Kyrie	C major	common time

== Reception ==
E. T. A. Hoffmann wrote in a review in 1813, expecting the power of Beethoven's Fifth Symphony, about the "expression of a childlike serene mind, which, relying on its purity, trusts in belief in God's mercy and pleads to him as to a father who wants the best for his children and fulfills their requests ("den Ausdruck eines kindlich heiteren Gemüths, das, auf seine Reinheit bauend, gläubig der Gnade Gottes vertraut und zu ihm fleht wie zu dem Vater, der das Beste seiner Kinder will und ihre Bitten erhört)". In the Agnus Dei, in C minor, he heard "a feeling of inner hurt which does not tear the heart but is good for it, and dissolves, like a sorrow from another world, to unearthly delight" ("ein Gefühl der inneren Wehmut, die aber das Herz nicht zerreisst, sondern ihm wohlthut, und sich, wie der Schmerz, der aus einer andern Welt gekommen ist, in überirdische Wonne auflöst"). Critic Nicholas Marston characterizes this review as "fail[ing] to find much favour".

Today, the mass is appreciated by critics (such as Rosen) but is probably one of the least performed of Beethoven's larger works. The work is generally overshadowed by Beethoven's later Missa solemnis. The Penguin Guide to Compact Discs (2007 edition) calls the work a "long-underrated masterpiece", while Michael Moore wrote "it has a directness and an emotional content that the [Missa solemnis] sometimes lacks."

== Recordings ==
The Mass in C major was described by conductor Trevor Harvey as "unjustly neglected", in regards to its recording history. As of 2008 there were only around 10 recordings of the Mass in C major; the Missa solemnis had been recorded at least 21 times. Of these, two are recordings of both masses together: Carlo Maria Giulini with the Philharmonia Orchestra and Philharmonia Chorus (1970) as well as Colin Davis with the London Symphony Orchestra and London Symphony Chorus (2008). Gramophone considers the former a stronger recording, due to its energy and vitality. Other noted recordings include a thoughtful interpretation by Richard Hickox and Collegium Musicum 90 (2003); a refreshing recording by John Eliot Gardiner with the Orchestre Révolutionnaire et Romantique and Monteverdi Choir; as well as an intimate take by George Guest with the Academy of St Martin in the Fields and Choir of St John's College, Cambridge.

== Notes, references, sources ==
=== Sources ===
- Anon. (August 1993). "Beethoven Masses; Colin Davis, London Symphony Orchestra". Gramophone.
- Gossett, Philip; Brauner, Patricia (2007) [1997]. "Rossini". In Holden, Amanda (ed.). The Penguin Opera Guide. London: Penguin. ISBN 978-0-14-051385-1 – via Internet Archive.
- Herttrich, Ernst (March 2010). "Foreword". Ludwig van Beethoven, Mass in C major (PDF). Carus-Verlag. pp. VI–VII.
- Hoffmann, E. T. A (1813). Konzertberichte. Carus-Verlag. pp. 252–265.
- Lockwood, Lewis (2005). Beethoven: The Music and the Life. New York City: Norton.
- Marston, Nicholas (2006). Beethoven: Mass in C major, Op. 86 (PDF) (CD). Hyperion Records. CDH55263.
- Moore, Michael (1999). "Program Notes: Beethoven – Merryman – St. Pierre" (PDF). Mendelssohn Club of Philadelphia. Archived from the original (PDF) on 13 May 2011.
- Rosen, Charles (1971). The Classical Style: Haydn, Mozart, Beethoven. New York City: Norton.
- Stoltzfus, Fred (November 1982). "Beethoven's 'Mass in C' / Notes on History, Structure, and Performance Practice". The Choral Journal. 23 (3): 26–30. JSTOR 23545801.
