= Choral Fantasy (Beethoven) =

Musical composition by Ludwig van Beethoven

- by Ludwig van Beethoven
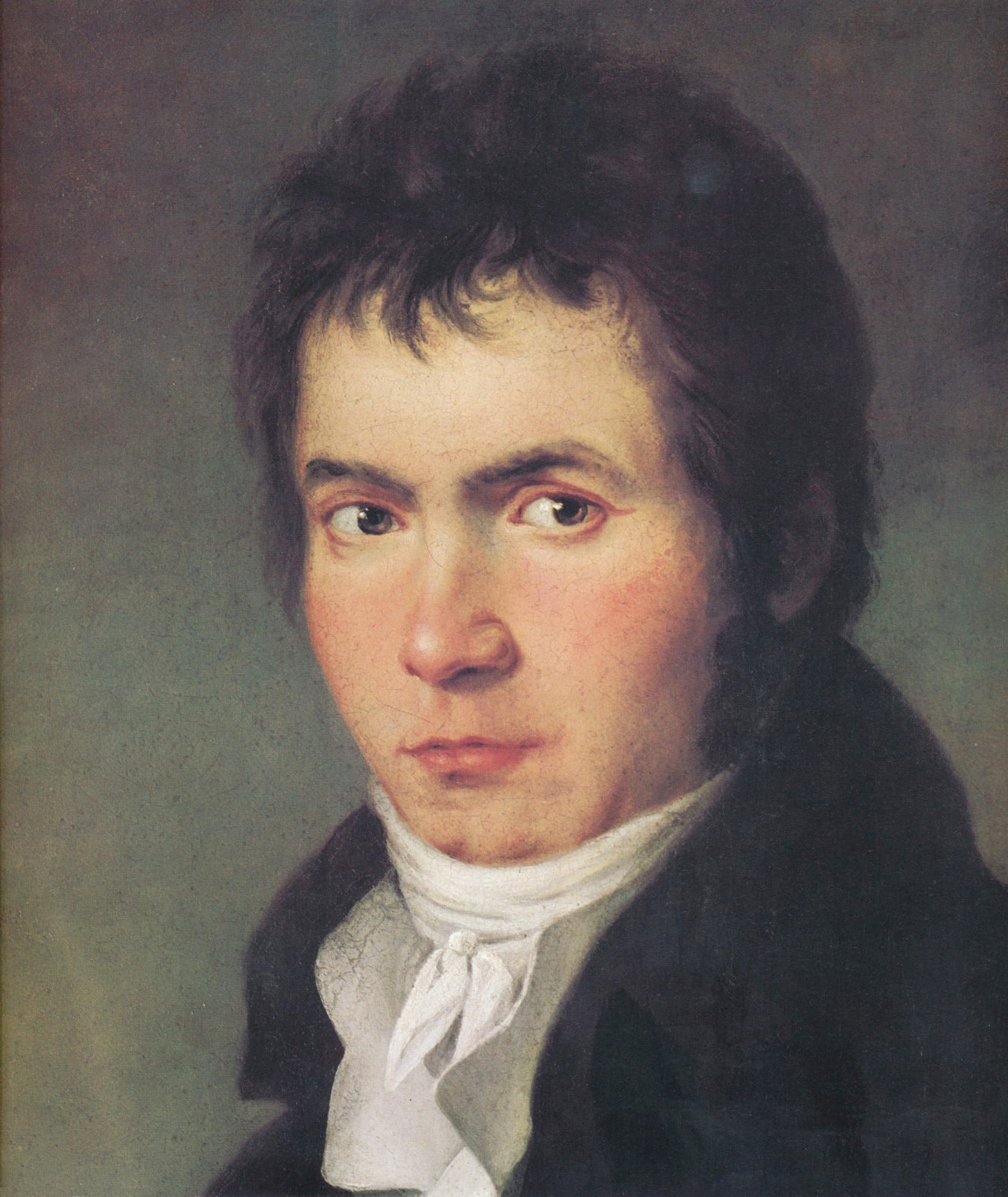
- Detail of a 1804–05 portrait of Beethoven by J. W. Mähler
- Native name: Fantasia
- Key: C minor, modulating to C major
- Opus: 80
- Language: German
- Composed: 1808
- Duration: About 20 minutes
- Scoring: piano; vocal soloists; mixed chorus; orchestra

Premiere
- Date: 22 December 1808
- Location: Theater an der Wien, Vienna
- Performers: Ludwig van Beethoven (piano)

The Fantasy for piano, vocal soloists, mixed chorus, and orchestra, Op. 80, usually called the Choral Fantasy, was composed in 1808 by then 38-year-old Ludwig van Beethoven.

Beethoven intended the Fantasy to serve as the concluding work for the benefit concert he put on for himself on 22 December 1808; the performers consisted of vocal soloists, mixed chorus, an orchestra, and Beethoven himself as piano soloist. The Fantasy was designed to include all the participants in the program and thus unites all of these musical forces.

The work is noted as a precursor to the later Ninth Symphony.

== Background, composition, and premiere ==
The Fantasia was first performed at the Akademie of 22 December 1808, a benefit concert which also saw the premieres of the Fifth and Sixth Symphonies and the Fourth Piano Concerto as well as a performance of excerpts of the Mass in C major. To conclude this memorable concert program, Beethoven wanted a "brilliant finale" that would unite in a single piece the different musical elements highlighted in the concert night: piano solo, mixed chorus and orchestra. The Fantasia, Op. 80, written shortly before, was thus composed expressly to fulfil this role. Beethoven himself played the piano part and the opening solo offers an example of his improvisational style (at the premiere he did, in fact, improvise this section).

Beethoven wrote the piece during the second half of December 1808 in an unusually short time by his standards. He commissioned a poet—whose identity is disputed—to write the words shortly before the performance to fit the already written parts. According to Beethoven's pupil Carl Czerny, the poet was Christoph Kuffner, but the later Beethoven scholar Gustav Nottebohm doubted this attribution and suggested it may have been Georg Friedrich Treitschke, who in 1814 prepared the final text of Beethoven's opera Fidelio.

The premiere performance seems to have been a rather troubled one; according to the composer's secretary, Anton Schindler, it "simply fell apart", a result most likely attributable to insufficient rehearsal time. Because of a mistake in the execution of the piece, it was stopped halfway through and restarted. In Ignaz von Seyfried's words:

When the master brought out his orchestral Fantasia with choruses, he arranged with me at the somewhat hurried rehearsal, with wet voice-parts as usual, that the second variation should be played without repeat. In the evening, however, absorbed in his creation, he forgot all about the instructions which he had given, repeated the first part while the orchestra accompanied the second, which sounded not altogether edifying. A trifle too late, the Concertmaster, Unrath, noticed the mistake, looked in surprise at his lost companions, stopped playing and called out dryly: 'Again!' A little displeased, the violinist Anton Wranitzky asked 'With repeats?' 'Yes', came the answer, and now the thing went straight as a string.

== The Choral Fantasy and the Ninth Symphony ==
The work includes a sequence of variations on a theme that is widely felt to be an early version of a far better known variation theme, namely the one to which Beethoven set the words of Friedrich Schiller's "Ode to Joy" in his Ninth Symphony. The two themes are compared below.

Michael Broyles has suggested another musical similarity: the two works share essentially the same harmonic sequence at their climactic moments, the chords (in C major) C–F–D–(G)–E♭, where the E♭ stands out from its harmonic context and is performed fortissimo. The words sung at this point are (for the Choral Fantasy) "Lieb und Kraft" ("love and strength") and (for the Ninth Symphony) "Über'm Sternenzelt! Über Sternen muss er wohnen." ("Above the tent of the stars, above the stars he must dwell.")

There are also affinities in the texts. The theme of the Choral Fantasy text – universal fraternity with the meeting of arts – evokes similar feelings as the "Ode to Joy" text.

Beethoven himself acknowledged the kinship of the two works. In a letter of 1824, when he was writing the Ninth Symphony, he described his project as "a setting of the words of Schiller's immortal 'Lied an die Freude' in the same way as my pianoforte fantasia with chorus, but on a far grander scale."

The Choral Fantasy theme is itself taken from an earlier work by Beethoven: it is a slightly modified version of the composer's "Seufzer eines Ungeliebten – Gegenliebe,” a lied for high voice and piano written c. 1794–1795.

== Form ==
External audio
- Choral Fantasy performed by the Dexter Community Orchestra and the Washtenaw Community Orchestra Chorus in 2009

The Choral Fantasy, which lasts about twenty minutes, is divided into two movements, played without a break:

1. Adagio
2. Finale. Allegro – Meno allegro (Allegretto) – Allegro molto – Adagio ma non troppo – Marcia, assai vivace – Allegro – Allegretto ma non troppo quasi andante con moto Schmeichelnd hold und lieblich klingen – Presto

The piece is scored for solo piano, mixed chorus, two soprano soloists, an alto soloist, two tenor soloists, a bass soloist, and an orchestra consisting of two flutes, two oboes, two clarinets, two bassoons, two horns, two trumpets, timpani and strings.

The Fantasy opens with a slow but virtuosic 26-bar piano introduction, beginning in C minor and modulating through a variety of keys in florid, improvisatory fashion. At its midpoint it settles on the dominant of the dominant, G major, with an extended cadenza. The implied key is never confirmed and the music eventually returns to C minor in a stormy passage, which at the last moment turns once more toward the dominant seventh of G in a sweeping arpeggio. This concludes the opening section.

The main part of the piece, marked "Finale", begins with a march-like motive (Allegro) played by the cellos and basses, alternating with recitative-like interjections from the piano. The music eventually brightens into C major and the solo piano introduces the principal theme (meno allegro) discussed above. Variations on the theme are then played by gradually increasing contingents of instruments: a solo flute, two oboes, a trio of two clarinets and bassoon, and string quartet. A full orchestral version of the theme played at a forte dynamic leads to the re-entry of the piano and to what seems at first like a postlude to this variation set, but that once again turns toward the dominant. The music pauses with a cadenza on the dominant seventh for the solo piano.

There is an abrupt change of mood as the minor mode returns in a stormy Allegro molto. The alternating phrases for piano and orchestra are a disguised variation of the principal theme. In fact, the three sections that follow the first variation set form another, larger-scale set of variations. The allegro molto soon takes on a developmental quality with a series of modulations, the strings playing phrases of the theme accompanied by rapid broken chords on the solo piano. After another cadenza on an E major triad the second large variation (Adagio, ma non troppo) follows, a calm, flowing A major section prominently featuring the clarinets. This ends with a call-and-response section between double reeds, horn, and piano, and leads without break into the key of F major and the third variation on the main theme, Marcia (assai vivace). A reprise of the instrumental theme from the first Allegro forms the transition into the choral finale (Allegretto).

The first half of this is essentially a recapitulation of previously heard material at the beginning of the Finale with the addition of solo voices and chorus, another point of similarity with the finale of the Ninth Symphony. After a prolonged dominant pedal and arpeggios from the soloist the chorus, two solo sopranos sing the main theme, followed by a variation featuring a trio of men's voices. After these two variations the entire chorus is joined by the orchestra for the first time in a tutti rendition of the theme. The music gains excitement and eventually breaks into an accelerated coda (Presto) with all forces joining to bring the piece to a triumphant close.

== Text ==
Schmeichelnd hold und lieblich klingen
unseres Lebens Harmonien,
und dem Schönheitssinn entschwingen
Blumen sich, die ewig blühn.
Fried und Freude gleiten freundlich
wie der Wellen Wechselspiel.
Was sich drängte rauh und feindlich,
ordnet sich zu Hochgefühl.

Wenn der Töne Zauber walten
und des Wortes Weihe spricht,
muss sich Herrliches gestalten,
Nacht und Stürme werden Licht.
Äuß're Ruhe, inn're Wonne
herrschen für den Glücklichen.
Doch der Künste Frühlingssonne
läßt aus beiden Licht entstehn.

Großes, das ins Herz gedrungen,
blüht dann neu und schön empor.
Hat ein Geist sich aufgeschwungen,
hallt ihm stets ein Geisterchor.
Nehmt denn hin, ihr schönen Seelen,
froh die Gaben schöner Kunst
Wenn sich Lieb und Kraft vermählen,
lohnt den Menschen Göttergunst.

Graceful, charming and sweet is the sound
Of our life's harmonies,
and from a sense of beauty arise
Flowers which eternally bloom.
Peace and joy advance in perfect concord,
like the changing play of the waves.
All that was harsh and hostile,
has turned into sublime delight.

When music's enchantment reigns,
speaking of the sacred word,
Magnificence takes form,
The night and the tempest turns to light:
Outer peace and inner bliss
Reign o'er the fortunate ones.
All art in the spring's sun
Lets light flow from both.

Greatness, once it has pierced the heart,
Then blooms anew in all its beauty.
Once one's being has taken flight,
A choir of spirits resounds in response.
Accept then, you beautiful souls,
Joyously the gifts of high art.
When love and strength are united,
Divine grace is bestowed upon Man.

The piece ends with repetition of phrases from the last four lines.

As noted above, the words were written in haste, and Beethoven was perhaps not entirely pleased with them. He later wrote to his publisher Breitkopf & Härtel:

You may wish to print another text, as the text like the music was written very quickly ... Still with another set of words I want the word kraft ["strength"] to be kept or one similar to it in its place.

As Kalischer et al. observe, the word Kraft "is treated with grand style in the music."

A new German text was written by a German poet and Communist politician Johannes R. Becher in 1951, keeping the word Kraft in the same position. Becher's text, inspired by Beethoven's explicit permission to change the lyrics, is an ode to peace that reflects the post-war atmosphere. Becher's lyrics were used in several recordings especially in East Germany, for example those of Franz Konwitschny or Herbert Kegel.
