= First Viennese School =

18th and 19th century classical music school

The First Viennese School is a name mostly used to refer to three composers of the Classical period in Western art music in late-18th-century to early-19th-century Vienna: Joseph Haydn, Wolfgang Amadeus Mozart and the first period of Ludwig van Beethoven. Sometimes, Franz Schubert is added to the list.

In German-speaking countries, the term Wiener Klassik (lit. Viennese classical era/art) is used. That term is often more broadly applied to the Classical era in music as a whole, as a means to distinguish it from other periods that are colloquially referred to as classical, namely Baroque and Romantic music.

The term "Viennese School" was first used by Austrian musicologist Raphael Georg Kiesewetter, in 1834, although he only counted Haydn and Mozart as members of the school. Other writers followed suit and eventually Beethoven was added to the list. The designation "first" is added today to avoid confusion with the Second Viennese School.

These composers sometimes encountered each other: Haydn and Mozart were even occasional chamber-music partners. Beethoven for a time received lessons from Haydn, probably heard Mozart play, and met Schubert a few times (see Beethoven and his contemporaries). However, they did not form a school in the sense of a deliberate co-operation associated with 20th-century schools, such as the Second Viennese School, or Les Six. Nor is there any evidence (other than Haydn teaching Beethoven) that one composer was "schooled" by another, in the way that Berg and Webern were taught by Schoenberg.

Attempts to extend the First Viennese School to include such later figures as Anton Bruckner, Johannes Brahms, Gustav Mahler, and Richard Strauss are merely journalistic, and never encountered in academic musicology. According to scholar James F. Daugherty, the Classical period itself from approximately 1775 to 1825 is sometimes referred to as "the Viennese Classic period".

== See also ==
- Beethoven and Haydn
- Beethoven and Mozart
- Beethoven and Schubert
- Haydn and Mozart
