= Beethoven concert of 22 December 1808 =

Benefit concert held for Ludwig van Beethoven in Vienna, Austria

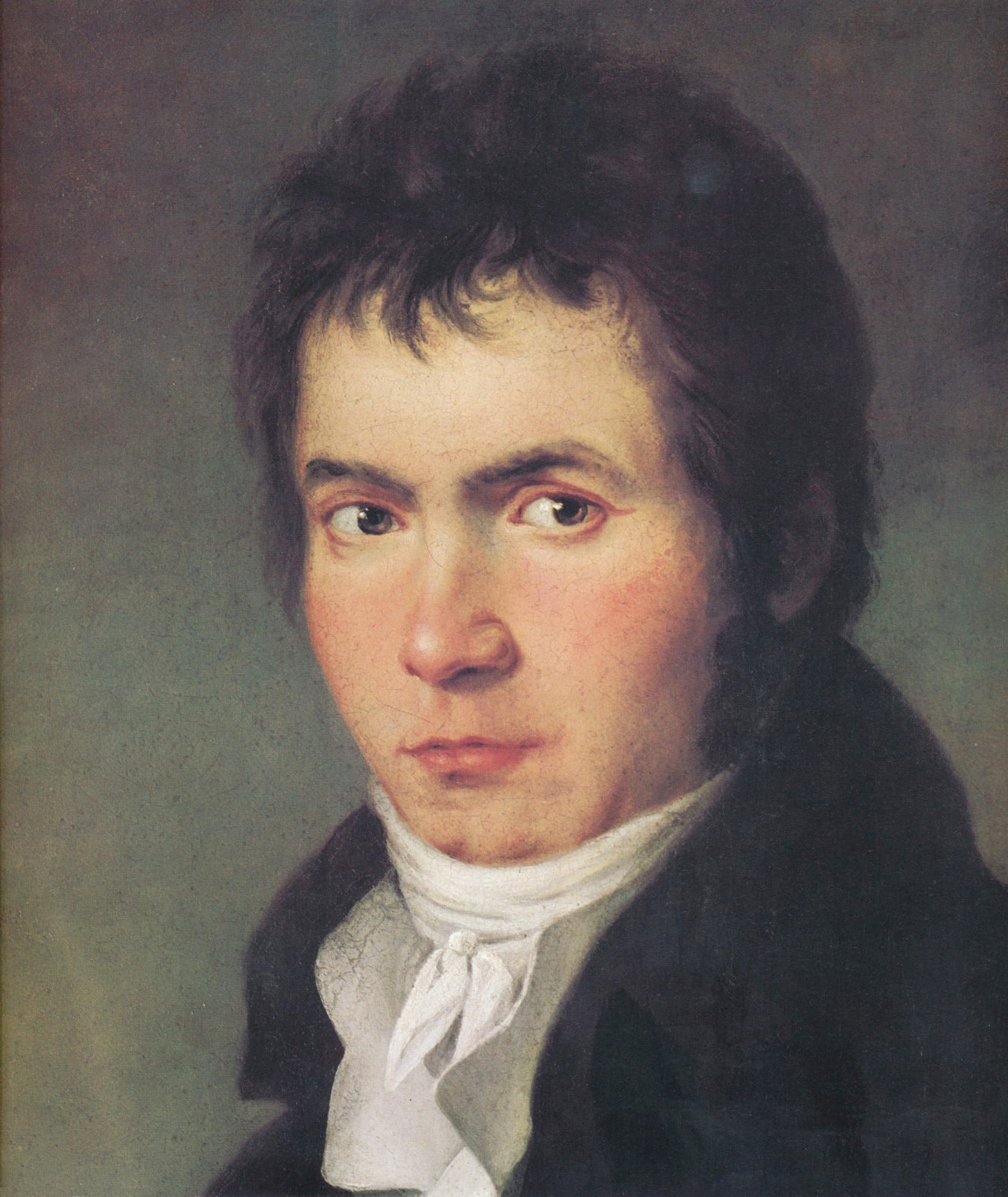
- Detail of an 1804–05 Beethoven portrait by J. W. Mähler
- Time: 22 December 1808
- Venue: Theater an der Wien
- Location: Vienna
- Programme: Symphony No. 6; "Ah! perfido"; "Gloria" from Mass in C major; Piano Concerto No. 4; Symphony No. 5; "Sanctus" from Mass in C major; Extemporised fantasia for piano; Choral Fantasy

The Beethoven concert of 22 December 1808 was a benefit concert held for Ludwig van Beethoven at the Theater an der Wien in Vienna that featured the public premieres of Beethoven's Fifth and Sixth Symphonies, the Fourth Piano Concerto and the Choral Fantasy. The performers were a pickup orchestra, a chorus, vocal soloists, and Beethoven as conductor and piano soloist. The concert was held in a very cold hall, lasted too long (about four hours), and showed poor standards of performance, thus providing a very shaky launch for works that eventually came to be recognized as masterpieces. Beethoven biographer Barry Cooper calls the concert's content the "most remarkable" of Beethoven's career.

== Background ==
Conditions for the performance of symphonic music in the Vienna of 1808 were hardly optimal, as Robert Kahn explains:

Even a grand public concert could draw only from the aristocracy and the city's small middle class, [estimated at] no more than 2.5 percent of Vienna's 200,000 to 250,000 residents. The standard price for a concert ticket was two gulden ... which was more than a week's salary for a laborer. Musicians could not give academies in the summer, when the nobility fled the dust and heat of Vienna to their country estates, and during the fall and winter the theaters were given over to rehearsals and performances of operas, the high status form of musical production. The only time available for academies was during Advent and Lent, when operas were forbidden. During these six weeks, competition for halls was fierce, and theater managers could and did refuse nights to Beethoven in favor of mediocrities.

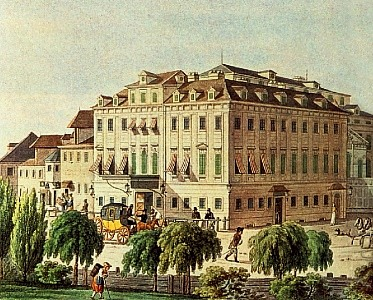
The Theater an der Wien as it appeared in 1812. The theater still exists and thrives today as a major venue for opera.

In Vienna, the theaters were either under government sponsorship (the Burgtheater and the Kärntnertortheater, both in central Vienna) or were private enterprises located in the outer districts of the city. Beethoven's chosen venue, the Theater an der Wien, was in the latter category. It was a very substantial building, described as "the most lavishly equipped and one of the largest theatres of its age." It had opened to rave reviews in 1801; for instance, the Allgemeine musikalische Zeitung called it the "most comfortable and satisfactory in the whole of Germany" (which meant at the time, "all German-speaking lands"). Beethoven had already premiered several of his most important works to date in this theater; for a listing see Theater an der Wien; and he had even lived in the theater building (which included some apartments) while working on his never-finished opera (1803) Vestas Feuer.

During 1807 and 1808, Beethoven had provided his works and services to a series of charity concerts at the Theater an der Wien. The Theater's director, Joseph Hartl, ultimately permitted Beethoven to use the venue for the 22 December 1808 concert, which was for Beethoven's private benefit. Beethoven had lobbied for a private benefit concert for many months—in return for his participation in the charity concerts—and expressed frustration at what he perceived to be Hartl's procrastination on the matter.

The Wiener Zeitung carried an advertisement for the concert on 17 December 1808, labelling it a "musical Akademie"; this was the common German term for a concert in Beethoven's time.

== Programme ==
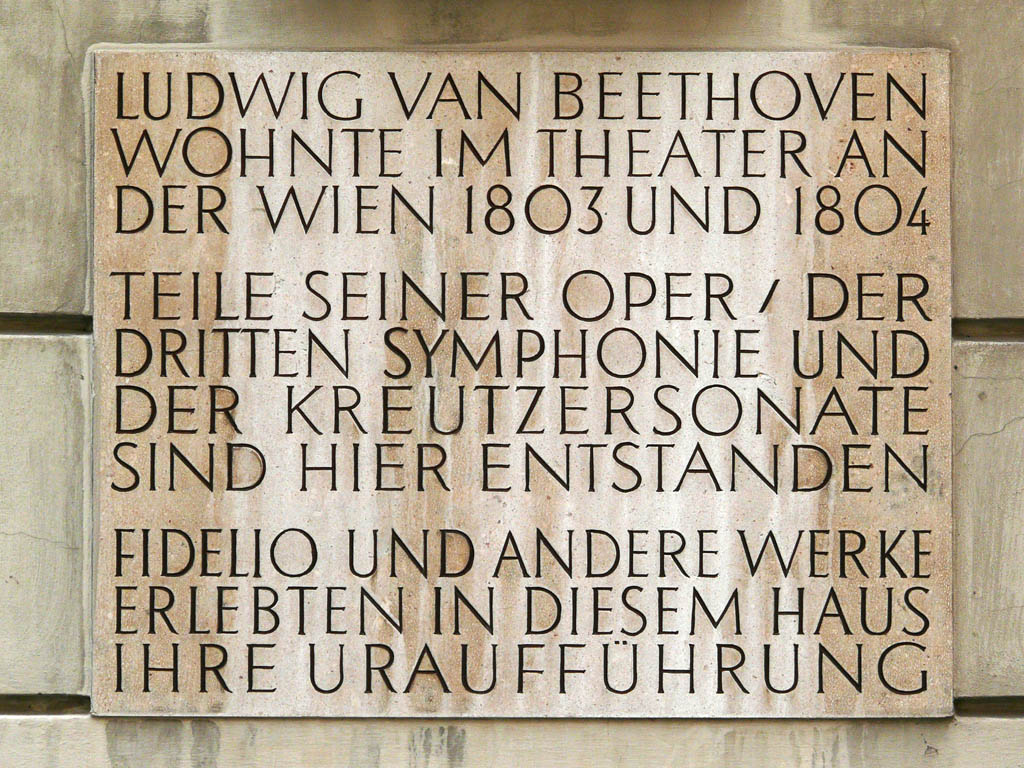
The Beethoven memorial now displayed on the exterior wall of the Theater an der Wien. The text reads, "Ludwig van Beethoven lived in the Theater an der Wien in 1803 and 1804. Parts of his opera, the Third Symphony, and the Kreutzer Sonata were written here. Fidelio and other works received their first performance in this house."

The concert commenced at 6:30 p.m. and lasted for approximately four hours, with an interval (intermission) separating two parts:

Part 1
Symphony No. 6 "Pastoral", Op. 68
"Ah! perfido", concert aria for soprano solo and orchestra, Op. 65
"Gloria", from the Mass in C major for vocal soloists, chorus, and orchestra, Op. 86
Piano Concerto No. 4, Op. 58
Part 2
Symphony No. 5, Op. 67
"Sanctus", from the Mass in C major, Op. 86
Extemporised fantasia for solo piano
Choral Fantasy for piano soloist, vocal soloists, chorus, and orchestra, Op. 80

Of the non-premiered works, "Ah! perfido" had been composed in 1796. The C major Mass had been premiered the previous year in Eisenstadt under the auspices of Prince Esterházy. According to Sutton, the improvised piano fantasia is the work that was later written out and published as the Fantasia in G minor, Beethoven's Op. 77 (1809).

The Choral Fantasy was the last of the works to be composed; it was barely finished in time for the concert, leaving insufficient opportunity for rehearsal. It was the concert's concluding work, bringing together pianist, choir and orchestra.

The two movements from the Mass in C were not advertised in the programme as such, due to restrictions on performing church music in theatres.

The program would strike most concertgoers today as being extraordinarily long. Yet in Beethoven's time, this was perhaps not so. Lowe writes:

In the decades around 1800 the number and variety of pieces on this concert was not all that unusual. Each half of a public concert program typically opened with a symphony, followed by an aria or two, a concerto, perhaps some chamber music and keyboard improvisations. Another symphony, or at the very least the finale of one, usually closed the concert.

Thus it is possible that the difficulty of the concert for listeners may have arisen from the need to take in a whole series of complex and original works (see critical reactions below), as well as the cold.

== Musical forces ==
Forced to squeeze in his benefit concert at a very busy time, Beethoven was handicapped in summoning adequate musical forces. In principle, he had access to the professional orchestra of the Theater an der Wien, but many of its members had a conflicting engagement: the Tonkünstler-Societät, a benevolent society for the widows and orphans of musicians, was putting on one of its four annual oratorio performances at the Burgtheater. The Society generally required its members to participate in its benefit concerts or pay a fine. Indeed, Beethoven's concert provoked the ire of Antonio Salieri, his former teacher, who was in charge of the Tonkünstler-Societät and thus responsible for ensuring attendance. Salieri threatened to ban any musicians of the Society who had played in Beethoven's concert instead of his own. (Following the concerts the relationship between the two composers improved.)

The scheduling conflict with the Tonkünstler-Societät reduced the number of skilled professionals available to Beethoven, and amateurs were employed to fill the gaps. In the end, the ad hoc orchestra Beethoven was able to summon was a moderately sized ensemble that is likely to have had in the order of six to eight first violins for the evening. Amateur and semi-professional concerts of the period saw larger orchestras.

Beethoven was the pianist for the concerto, the improvised fantasia and the Choral Fantasy. Never again would Beethoven appear as a soloist in a piano concerto: his declining hearing would render it impossible. Contemporary accounts describe Beethoven as the conductor of the orchestra; however, it is possible that because of frustrations arising at a November 15 concert, Beethoven only had limited direction over the orchestra, and the orchestra had refused to rehearse under his baton.

== Performance ==
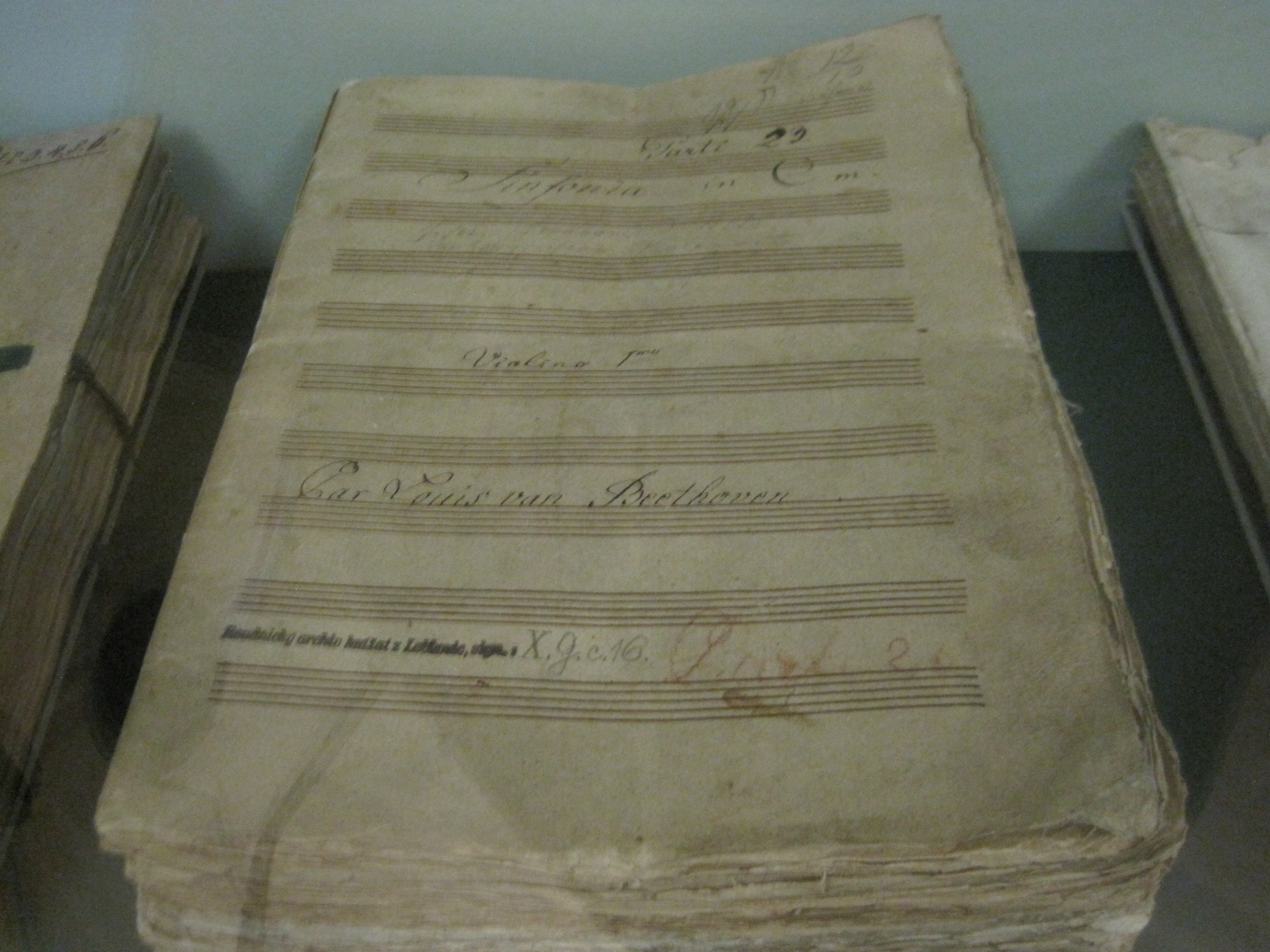
The hand-copied parts used for the premiere of Beethoven's Fifth Symphony. They include corrections hand-entered by the composer, and are on display in the Lobkowitz family museum in Prague.

By all accounts, the execution of the music was inferior. One review targeted the orchestra, saying that it "could be considered lacking in all respects". Initially, Beethoven had chosen the outstanding soprano Anna Milder to sing the “Ah! perfido” scene and aria, but she dropped the role after a quarrel between Beethoven and her fiance Peter Hauptmann. The soloist chosen instead was the teenage Josephine Killitschgy, the sister-in-law of Ignaz Schuppanzigh, who was so taken by stage fright that she butchered the solo.

An aggravating factor for the audience was the extremely cold weather.

The lowest point in the performance occurred during the Choral Fantasy, which had been insufficiently rehearsed; adherence to the score fell apart at one point, leading Beethoven to stop and restart the piece. Ignaz von Seyfried later wrote:

When the master brought out his orchestral Fantasia with choruses, he arranged with me at the somewhat hurried rehearsal, with wet voice-parts as usual, that the second variation should be played without repeat. In the evening, however, absorbed in his creation, he forgot all about the instructions which he had given, repeated the first part while the orchestra accompanied the second, which sounded not altogether edifying. A trifle too late, the Concertmaster, Unrath, noticed the mistake, looked in surprise at his lost companions, stopped playing and called out dryly: 'Again!' A little displeased, the violinist Anton Wranitzky asked 'With repeats?' 'Yes,' came the answer, and now the thing went straight as a string.

This part of Seyfried's account emphasizes the humor of the situation, but there were also some negative consequences for Beethoven. Seyfried goes on:

At first [Beethoven] could not understand that he had in a manner humiliated the musicians. He thought it was a duty to correct an error that had been made and that the audience was entitled to hear everything properly played, for its money. But he readily and heartily begged the pardon of the orchestra for the humiliation to which he had subjected it, and was honest enough to spread the story himself and assume all responsibility for his own absence of mind.

== Critical responses ==
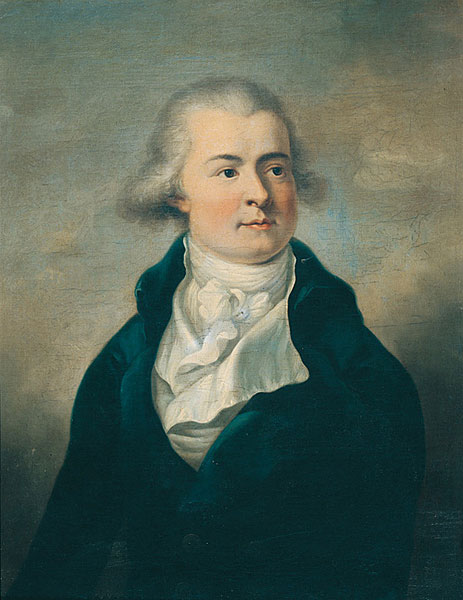
Prince Joseph Franz von Lobkowitz, patron of Beethoven and attendee

In this troubled venture Beethoven did enjoy the advantage that many in the audience were enthusiasts for his music and eager to attend. One such was the composer Johann Friedrich Reichardt, who was visiting Vienna. He later wrote (in his Personal Letters Written on a Trip to Vienna, 1810):

[25 December 1808] The past week, during which the theaters were closed, the evenings filled with public concerts and musical performances, causes me no little embarrassment in my ardent resolve to hear everything. This applies particularly to the twenty-second, when the local musicians gave the first of this season's great performances at the Burgtheater for their "deserving widows" fund [Tonkünstler-Societät; see above], while on the same day Beethoven also gave at the great suburban theater [Theater an der Wien] a concert for his benefit, at which only his works were played. This last I could not conceivably miss; that morning, accordingly, I accepted with many thanks the kind invitation of Prince von Lobkowitz to join him in his box.

Prince von Lobkowitz was a patron and supporter of Beethoven. Reichardt goes on to say:

There we sat, in the most bitter cold, from half past six until half past ten, and confirmed for ourselves the maxim that one may easily have too much of a good thing, still more of a powerful one.

Reichardt's opinion echoed that of the Allgemeine musikalische Zeitung:

To judge all these pieces after one and only hearing, especially considering the language of Beethoven's works, in that so many were performed one after the other, and that most of them are so grand and long, is downright impossible.

The works on the program have been esteemed to different degrees by posterity. The 5th and 6th Symphonies managed to overcome their unfortunate premiere and eventually emerged as key works of the symphonic repertoire; and the G major piano concerto likewise came to be among the most beloved works of its genre. The Choral Fantasy is often performed, less so the soprano aria and the Mass in C, and still less so the improvised piano fantasy, assuming that is indeed the work published later as Opus 77.

== Financial results ==
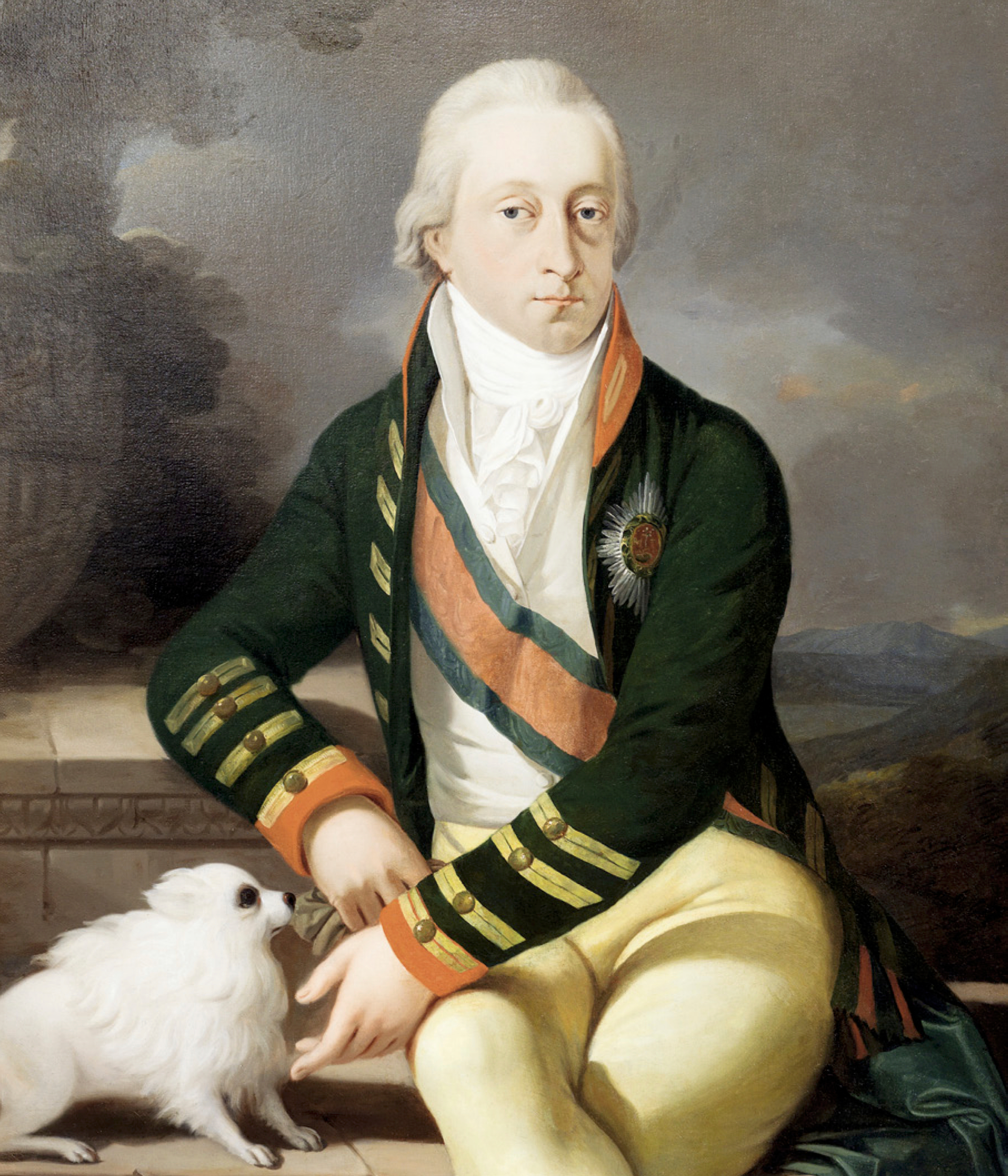
Nikolaus II Esterházy, who both commissioned the C major Mass and financially supported the 22 December benefit concert. Portrait by Josef Lanzedelli, 1803.

Beethoven's biographer Thayer writes that "the pecuniary results of this concert to Beethoven are not known" but that a record indicates that Prince Esterházy ordered "the sum of 100 gulden to be paid to Beethoven in support of this 'musical Akademie.' "

== Recreations ==
Review of Beethoven concert of 22 December 1808 in Allgemeine musikalische Zeitung issue of 25 January 1809

The audacity and weight of Beethoven's concert program has inspired various modern orchestras to replicate it. The following list is ordered chronologically.

- New Jersey Symphony Orchestra (May 1986)
- Historic Keyboard Society of Milwaukee (1994)
- Baltimore Symphony Orchestra (October 1998)
- Royal Scottish National Orchestra (August 2001)
- Mostly Mozart Festival (August 2007)
- Vienna Radio Symphony Orchestra (22 December 2008)
- Festival de Lanaudière (July 2012)
- Melbourne Symphony Orchestra (May 2015)
- San Francisco Symphony (June 2015)
- BBC Scottish Symphony Orchestra (October 2016)
- Royal Northern Sinfonia (10 June 2017)
- University of the Pacific Symphony Orchestra and Combined Choruses (November 11, 2017)
- Chorus and Orchestra of the Pfalztheaters Kaiserslautern (April 2018)
- PianoEspoo Festival (10 November 2019)
- Vienna Symphony (11 January 2020)
- Welsh National Opera Orchestra and BBC National Orchestra of Wales (19 January 2020)
- Balthasar Neumann Ensemble & Chor (7 February 2020, Dortmund; and 9 February 2020, Hamburg)
- Cincinnati Symphony Orchestra (29 February 2020 and 1 March 2020)
- Philharmonia Orchestra (15 March 2020)
