= Es ist vollbracht =

Es ist vollbracht (lit. "It is finished") is a German expression. It may refer to:

== Music ==
- Es ist vollbracht (Beethoven) (1815), a chorus by Ludwig van Beethoven from a Singspiel by several composers
- "Es ist vollbracht", an aria from Johann Sebastian Bach's St John Passion (1724)

== Religion ==
- The sixth of the sayings of Jesus on the cross
