= Es ist vollbracht (Beethoven) =

1815 composition by Beethoven

- Secular chorus by Ludwig van Beethoven
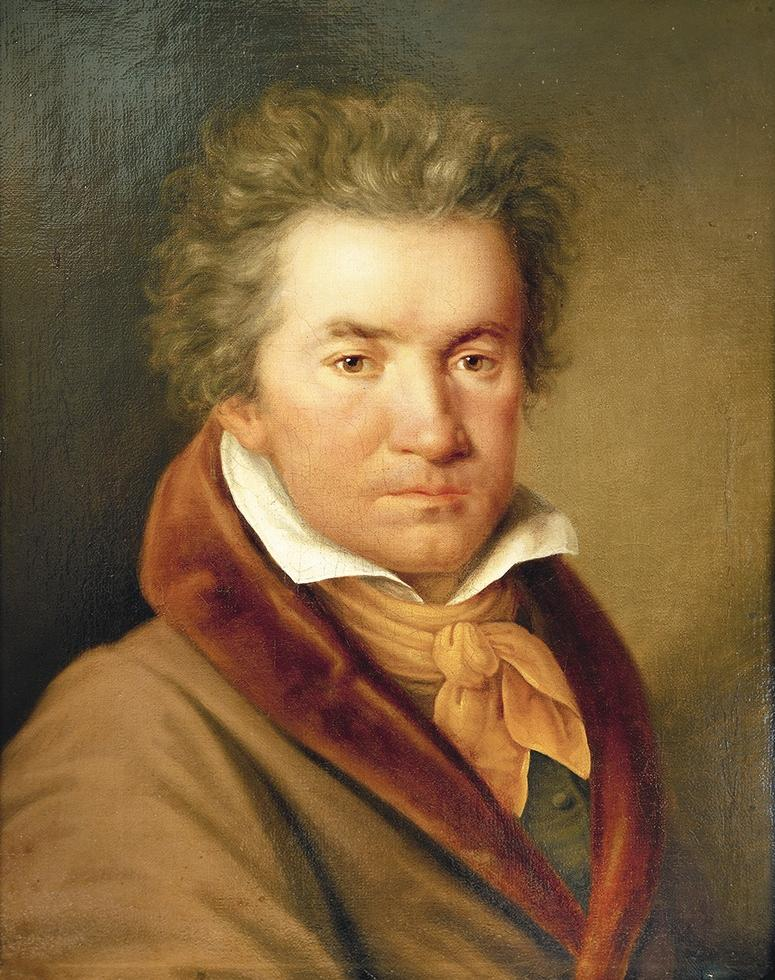
- Beethoven in 1815
- Key: D major
- Catalogue: WoO 97
- Composed: 1815
- Published: 1832

Ludwig van Beethoven's "Es ist vollbracht" (German for "It is finished"), WoO 97, was written in 1815 as a finale chorus for a Singspiel by a variety of composers called Die Ehrenpforten (The Gates of Glory) on a drama by G. F. Treitschke. It honours the second seizure of Paris in 1815 after the abdication of Napoleon. It remains one of Beethoven's lesser-known works and is rarely produced nowadays.

== Context ==
The wave of patriotic music of 1814, frustrated by the intermezzo of the Hundred Days during which Napoleon came back from his exile to Elba, had its natural and logical extension on the occasion of the second entry of the allied troops in Paris on 7 July 1815.

G. F. Treitschke, who had revised the libretto for Fidelio in 1814, asked Beethoven for a closing chorus to his dramatic piece, or Singspiel. It was performed on July 15, 16 and 23, and on the occasion of the Emperor's nameday, was revived with appropriate changes, "Es ist vollbracht" being substituted by "Germania".

== Composition ==
The work is scored for bass, mixed choir, 2 flutes, 2 oboes, 2 clarinets, 2 bassoons, 2 horns, 2 trumpets, 2 trombones, cymbals, strings. The work is around five minutes long.

The piece provides for a bass, the part of which overwhelms that of the choir. In fact, the choir is limited to repeating, as in a responsory, the last words of the four strophes of the soloist, that is, always the same exclamation "Es ist vollbracht" (i.e. It is finished). Even the music is repetitive, varying from one verse to another only in the orchestration. Before concluding, Beethoven introduces, in correspondence with the final words "Thank God and our Emperor", the melody by Joseph Haydn which became the national anthem "Gott erhalte Franz den Kaiser" (God save Franz our Emperor). Anticipated from the flute, it is subsequently developed from below as it is firmly bound to the refrain phrase "It is finished". This is emphatically spelled out by the chorus, so the orchestra, with strings of tremolo and wild trombones, bringing the piece to a triumphal close.

== Lyrics ==
Es ist vollbracht!
Zum Herrn hinauf drang unser Bethen.
Er hörte, was die Völker flehten,
Und hat gehüthet und gewacht.
Es ist vollbracht!

Es ist vollbracht!
Was frevelvoll der Höll' entkommen,
Zum zweytenmahl ist's weggenommen,
Geschleudert in die alte Nacht.
Es ist vollbracht!

Es ist vollbracht!
Im Raum von wenig bangen Tagen,
Das Werk, das keine Worte sagen.
Geschehen schon, eh' wir's gedacht.
Es ist vollbracht!

Es ist vollbracht!
Der Fürsten treu Zusammenhalten,
Ihr ernstes, rechtes, frommes Walten,
Gab uns den Sieg, nächst Gottes Macht!
Es ist vollbracht!

Translation:

It is finished!
Up to the Lord came our prayer.
He heard what the people pleaded,
And hath guarded and watched.
It is finished!

It is finished!
The criminal who had escaped from Hell,
Is defeated for the second time,
Humped in the everlasting night.
It is finished!

It is finished!
In the space of little anxious days,
The work that say no words.
It has happened already, before we thought it.
It is finished!

It is finished!
The loyalty of the Princes,
Their seriousness, righteousness, rule,
Gave us victory, through the power of God!
It is finished!

== Political dimension ==
"Es ist vollbracht" has been characterized by some as "un-Beethovenian", as well as the "worst" in this heroic style. It could be misguided to see this composition as a capitulation to authoritarianism by Beethoven, but rather as a celebration of the liberation after the fall of the French invader, Napoleon. After the French Emperor crushed Austria in the War of the Fifth Coalition (1809), Beethoven's original enthusiasm for the freedom-inspired Bonaparte began to cool noticeably. The title of his work, "Es ist vollbracht", (it is accomplished) from the last words of Christ on the Cross, are an unequivocal statement as to his stand in regard to the fallen leader.

== See also ==
- Beethoven and his contemporaries
- Music and politics
