= Piano Concerto No. 4 (Beethoven) =

1806 composition by L. van Beethoven

Piano Concerto in G major
- No. 4
- by Ludwig van Beethoven
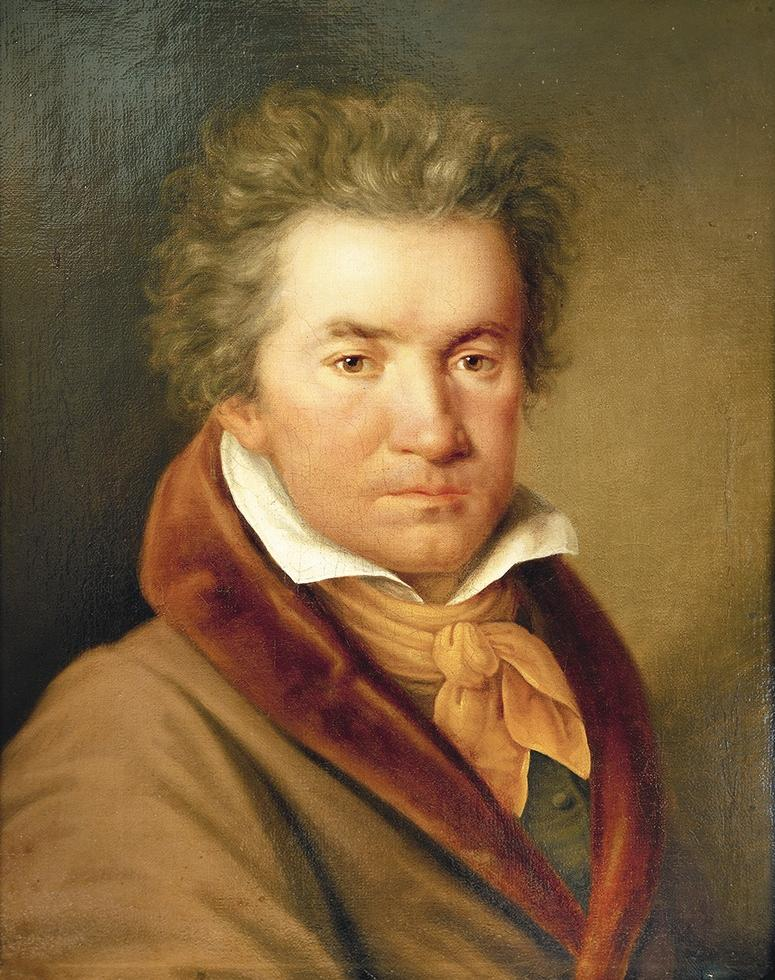
- The composer in 1815, by J. W. Mähler
- Opus: 58
- Composed: 1805–06
- Dedication: Archduke Rudolf of Austria
- Performed: 22 December 1808, Vienna
- Movements: 3 (Allegro moderato; Andante con moto; Rondo. Vivace.)
- Scoring: Piano; orchestra

Ludwig van Beethoven's Piano Concerto No. 4 in G major, Op. 58, was composed in 1805–1806. Beethoven was the soloist in the public premiere as part of the concert on 22 December 1808 at Vienna's Theater an der Wien.

== Orchestration ==
It is scored for solo piano and an orchestra consisting of one flute, two oboes, two clarinets, two bassoons, two horns, two trumpets, timpani, and strings.

== Premiere and reception ==
It was premiered in March 1807 at a private concert of the home of Prince Franz Joseph von Lobkowitz. The Coriolan Overture and the Fourth Symphony were premiered in that same concert. However, the public premiere was not until a concert on 22 December 1808 at Vienna's Theater an der Wien. Beethoven again took the stage as soloist. The marathon concert saw Beethoven's last appearance as a soloist with orchestra, as well as the premieres of the Choral Fantasy and the Fifth and Sixth symphonies. Beethoven dedicated the concerto to his friend, student, and patron, the Archduke Rudolf of Austria.

A review in the 17 May 1809 edition of the Allgemeine musikalische Zeitung states that "[this concerto] is the most admirable, singular, artistic and complex Beethoven concerto ever". However, after its first performance, the piece was neglected until 1836, when it was revived by Felix Mendelssohn.

The first recording was performed by York Bowen and issued by Vocalion in 1925. Today, the work is frequently recorded, and it is a favorite of concert audiences. It is also considered by many to be one of the pinnacles of the piano concerto repertoire.

== Structure ==
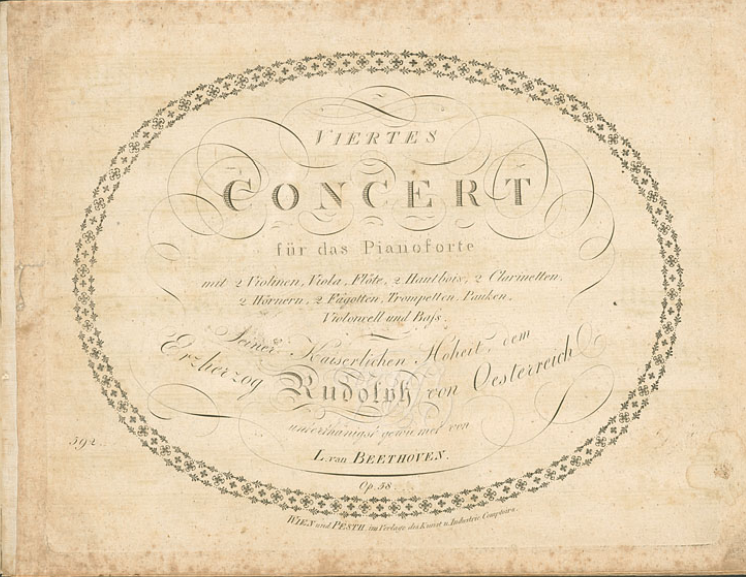
Title page, first edition

1st movement

2nd and 3rd movements

=== I. Allegro moderato ===
The first movement opens with the solo piano, playing simple chords in the tonic key before coming to rest on a dominant chord. The orchestra then enters with the same theme, in B major, the major mediant key, which is in a chromatic mediant relationship to the tonic. Thus enters the first theme.

The orchestra states the main theme in B major, dropping through the circle of fifths to a cadence in the tonic, G major. The theme is then stated again, this time in stretto between upper and lower voices. A very strong cadence in the tonic, withering away within one bar, introduces a transitional, modulatory theme with restless triplet accompaniment, also containing hints of stretto. The music moves to the minor mediant key, B minor, while its dynamic is reduced to pianissimo, at which point material from the opening theme returns. Through a rising bass line and sequential harmonies, the music regains the tonic key (on a dominant pedal) with a new theme derived from bars 3, 4, and 5. The final cadence is delayed for several bars before the material from the opening bar resurfaces as the movement's closing theme, accompanied by a tonic pedal over forte dominant chords.

Felix Salzer says the following about this opening, "[It is] one of the most fascinating substitutions of the entire literature...The whole passage appears as a most imaginative prolongation of interruption, the post-interruption phrase starting with a B-Major chord boldly substituting for the tonic. In addition, this post-interruption phrase introduces a very interesting melodic parallelism in form of an augmentation of the end of the pre-interruption phrase one step higher."

The piano's entrance resembles an Eingang, an improvisatory passage from Mozart's day that would have occurred after the orchestra's last unresolved dominant chord, but before the piano played the main theme. Beethoven captures this improvisatory style by accelerating the rhythm in the piano part, from eighth notes, to triplets, to sixteenth notes, and finally in a scale that rushes downward in sixteenth-note sextuplets. A long preparation is then made before a tonic cadence duly arrives, and the orchestra once again takes up the main theme.

=== II. Andante con moto ===
The second movement, known for its prominent and frequent use of a motif from the Dies Irae chant, has been associated with the imagery of Orpheus taming the Furies (represented, respectively, by the piano and unison strings) at the gates to Hades, a suggestion of Beethoven's 1859 biographer Adolf Bernhard Marx. The movement's quiet E minor ending leads without pause into the C major chords that open the finale.

=== III. Rondo (Vivace) ===
In contrast to the preceding movements, the third movement, in traditional rondo form, is simpler, characterized by a very rhythmic theme. The main theme begins, introduced quietly by the orchestra, in the subdominant key of C major before correcting itself to reach a cadence with the piano in the tonic key of G major.

== Cadenzas ==
Cadenzas for the Fourth Piano Concerto have been written by a number of pianists and composers throughout its history; these include Beethoven himself (two separate sets of cadenzas), Johannes Brahms, Clara Schumann, Ferruccio Busoni, Hans von Bülow, Ignaz Moscheles, Camille Saint-Saëns, Anton Rubinstein, Wilhelm Kempff, Nikolai Medtner, Eugen d'Albert, Leopold Godowsky, Wilhelm Backhaus, Samuil Feinberg, Manuel Ponce, and others.

== Reception ==
At its premiere in December 1808, the concerto received little immediate attention, overshadowed by the length and difficulty of the program, which also included the premieres of the Fifth and Sixth Symphonies. Early critics considered the work unusual, particularly the quiet piano entrance at the opening.

Critical opinion has since ranked the concerto among Beethoven's greatest works. Donald Tovey described it as "the most poetic of all Beethoven's concertos". Pianist Alfred Brendel has written that it "stands alone through its magical combination of grandeur and intimacy".

As of 2021, it was the second-most performed piano concerto at Carnegie Hall, with 192 performances.
