= Seufzer eines Ungeliebten – Gegenliebe =

1794/795 song by Ludwig van Beethoven

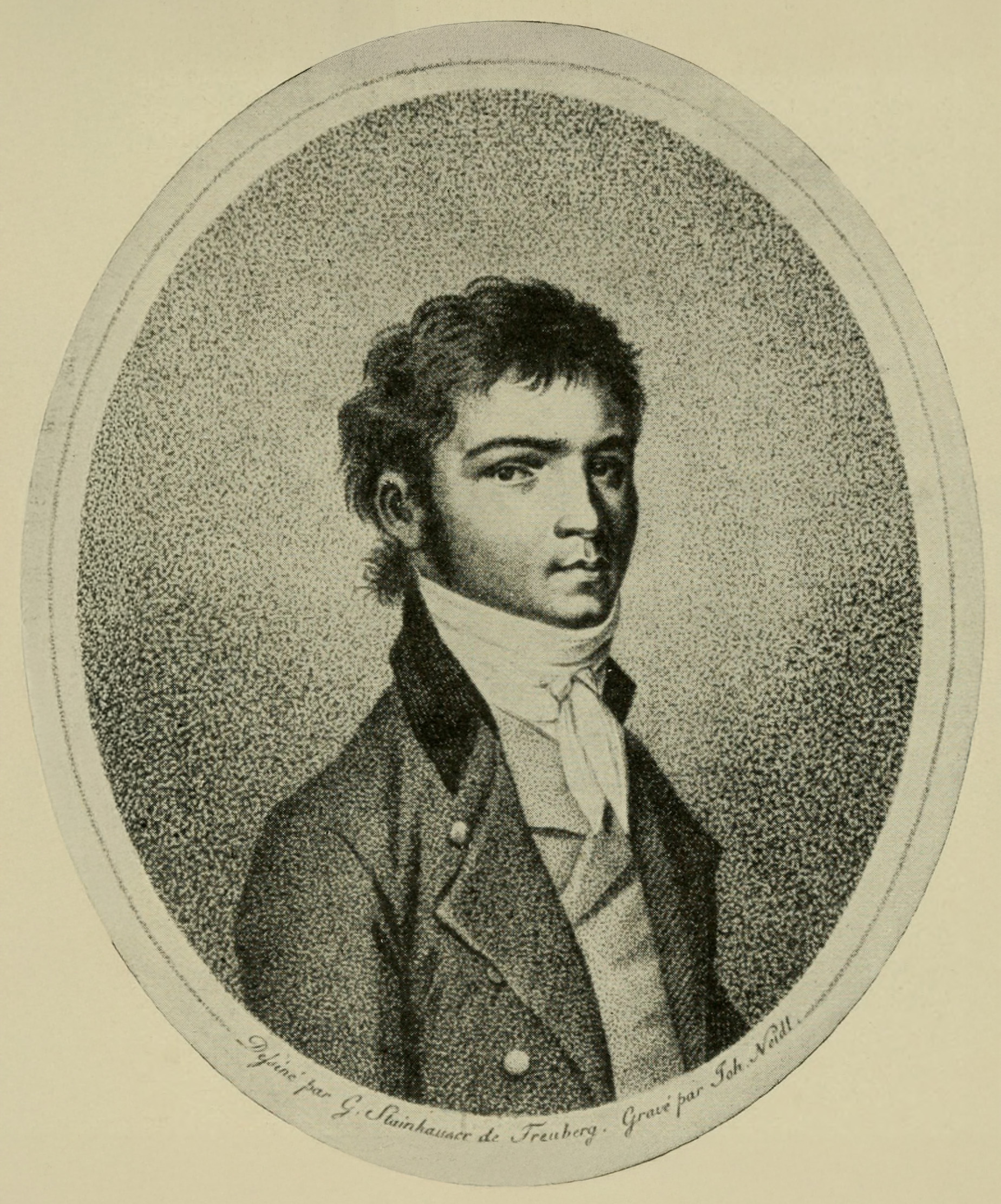
The earliest known portrait of Beethoven; 1801 engraving by Johann Joseph Neidl after a now-lost portrait by Gandolph Ernst Stainhauser von Treuberg, ca. 1800

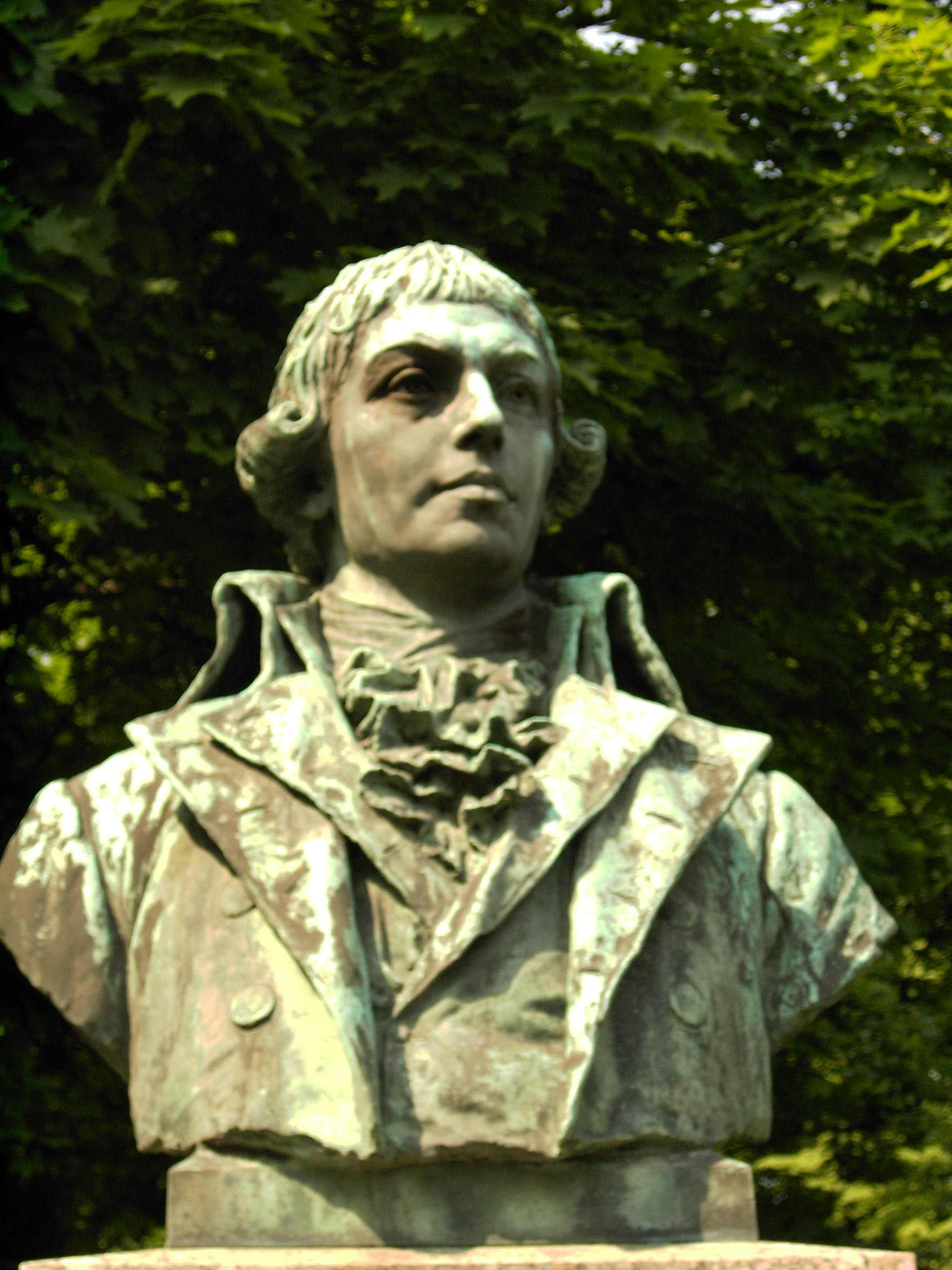
Gottfried August Bürger, who wrote the two poems "Seufzer eines Ungeliebten" and "Gegenliebe". This sculpture is a monument to Bürger in Göttingen

Seufzer eines Ungeliebten – Gegenliebe (Sigh of an unloved one – Love requited), WoO 118, is a song (lied) for voice and piano by Ludwig van Beethoven, composed at the end of 1794 or in 1795. The text comes from two related poems from the collection Lyrische Gedichte (1789) by Gottfried August Bürger. Both poems are written from the point of view of a young man experiencing unrequited love: "Seufzer eines Ungeliebten" expresses the conceit that while all the creatures of the woodlands and fields have a partner to love them, the young man has none; "Gegenliebe" expresses a blissful fantasy on the young man's part that his love is returned.

== Composition and publication history ==
The composer was about 24 when he wrote the song; he had arrived in Vienna in 1792 to study and build his career. Beethoven's primary teacher in Vienna was Joseph Haydn, who had himself already set the "Gegenliebe" poem to music (1784, Hob. XVIIa: 16). Beethoven also studied with Antonio Salieri, who helped him in his goal of becoming an opera composer. Beethoven's sketches for Seufzer/Gegenliebe are mixed with that of another song about unrequited love, "Adelaide", which unlike Seufzer/Gegenliebe was published at the time and was quite successful. It is unknown whether Beethoven attempted to publish Seufzer/Gegenliebe at the time of its composition. Much later in his lifetime, Beethoven offered the song to the publisher Peters of Leipzig, in a letter from 5 June 1822, (Note: For background and details of Beethoven's correspondence with Peters, see Zimmer (2016), pp. 13–16. Beethoven included the song in a price list, asking 12 gold ducats for it, evidently to no avail.) but in the end it was published only posthumously (1837) by Anton Diabelli. The work appears today in standard editions of Beethoven's songs and is occasionally performed and recorded.

== Seufzer/Gegenliebe and Beethoven's own life experience ==
As his friend Franz Gerhard Wegeler later remembered, Beethoven's composition of love songs coincided with a time that he himself was frequently in love:

In Vienna, at least for as long as I lived there, Beethoven was still engaged in romantic relationships, and at that time he had made conquests which would have been very difficult, if not impossible, for more than one Adonis. – Can a man, without having known love in its most intimate mysteries, have composed "Adelaide", Fidelio and so many other works? ... I will note again that, as far as I know, all the objects of his passions were of a high rank.

However, the fact that "all the objects of his passions were of a high rank" was problematic, as biographers such as Jan Swafford have pointed out: it was quite inappropriate for a commoner like Beethoven to form a love match with an aristocratic woman, and indeed Beethoven never succeeded in his life in creating a permanent romantic attachment; he died unwed. Hence it is possible that the sorrows and wishful thinking given in Bürger's poems resonated with Beethoven's own feelings.

== Text ==
Beethoven encountered Bürger's poems in their published form in the Göttingen Musen-Almanach. Originally, it appears that Bürger wrote the poems separately, then realized their connectedness and had them printed in subsequent editions adjacently, in the order Beethoven encountered.

As can be seen in the text below, Beethoven altered Bürger's words in minor ways.

Seufzer eines Ungeliebten
Hast du nicht Liebe zugemessen
Dem Leben jeder Kreatur?
Warum bin ich allein vergessen,
Auch meine Mutter du! du Natur?

Wo lebte wohl in Forst und Hürde,
Und wo in Luft und Meer, ein Tier,
Das nimmermehr geliebet würde? —
Geliebt wird alles außer mir!

Wenn gleich [im Hain, auf Flur und Matten] (Note: Original text: "in Hain und Wiesenmatten".)
Sich Baum und Staude, Moos und Kraut
Durch Lieb' und Gegenliebe gatten;
Vermählt sich mir doch keine Braut.

Mir wächst vom süßesten der Triebe
Nie Honigfrucht zur Lust heran.
Denn ach! mir mangelt Gegenliebe,
[Die Eine, nur Eine] (Note: Original text: "Die Eine nur".) gewähren kann.

The sighs of an unloved one
Hast thou not apportioned love
Into the life of every creature?
Why then am I alone forgotten
By thee, Nature, who art my mother as well?

Where, in the woods and enclosed fields,
Where in the air and the seas, has there ever lived a creature
That never was loved? —
All are loved, excepting myself.

Although in the groves, meadows, and pastures
Even the trees and bushes, the mosses and herbs
Are joined by love and love returned,
Yet no bride joins herself to me.

My sweetest passions never ripen
Into honey-fruits to enjoy.
Alas! I lack the requited love,
That only one (Note: The German Eine is feminine gender; implying "only one woman".) can grant me.

Gegenliebe
Wüßt' ich, wüßt' ich, daß du mich
Lieb und wert ein bißchen hieltest,
Und von dem, was ich für dich,
Nur ein Hundertteilchen fühltest;

Daß dein Danken meinem Gruß
Halben Wegs entgegen käme,
Und dein Mund den Wechselkuß
Gerne gäb' und wiedernähme:

Dann, o Himmel, außer sich,
Würde ganz mein Herz zerlodern!
Leib und Leben könnt' ich dich
Nicht vergebens lassen fodern! (Note: 'fodern' = archaic for 'fordern')

Gegengunst erhöhet Gunst,
Liebe nähret Gegenliebe,
Und entflammt zu Feuersbrunst,
Was ein Aschenfünkchen bliebe.

Requited love
If only, if only I knew that you loved me
And valued me a little,
And that you felt for me
But a hundredth of what I feel for you;

That your thanks for my greeting
Were returned but halfway,
And your lips the proffered kiss
Gladly gave and received in return:

Then, oh heavens, beside itself,
My whole heart would burst asunder into flames!
I could let you claim – not in vain –
My body and my life!

Favor brings forth increased favor,
Love nurtures requited love,
And ignites a tempest of fire
From what else had remained but a spark among the ashes.

=== Meters ===
Seufzer eines Ungeliebten is composed in iambic tetrameter, with the first line of each couplet including an extra final unstressed syllable, so the lines alternate between 9 and 8 syllables. This is a widely used pattern, seen for instance in Goethe's poem "Wilkommen und Abschied". "Gegenliebe" is in a version of trochaic tetrameter in which half of the lines are catalectic; i.e. they omit the final eighth syllable. (Note: The meter of "Gegenliebe" is, however, quite unusual in arranging its 8- and 7-syllable lines within couplets so that the shorter, 7-syllable line comes first in the couplet (i.e. "7 + 8" couplets). The norm for length-differentiated couplets is 8 + 7; see e.g. Attridge 1982, p. 103. Beethoven partially repairs the metrical anomaly by assigning the last syllable of the 7-syllable lines two quarter notes, a melisma, thus approximating the normal 8 + 8. But Youens nonetheless remarks that "the prosody leaves something to be desired". In the later version of the "Gegenliebe" tune that Beethoven created for his Choral Fantasy (see below), the problem is resolved by using different poetry and altered music.) In both poems, the lines are grouped into quatrains with rhyme scheme A–B–A–B.

== The music ==
The song reaches the A above middle C and thus is suited to be sung by a tenor (or, in principle, a soprano) voice. Other singers have sung the work transposed; for instance, the baritone Dietrich Fischer-Dieskau recorded the work in A minor, a minor third lower than notated.

Pilcher calls the song "formally adventurous", and it is indeed unusual for a composer to incorporate two poems into the same song. (Note: To be sure, in the song cycle a composer strings together a set of related songs into a single work; Beethoven himself was later a pioneer of the song cycle in his An die ferne Geliebte (1816). Ronyak toys with the idea of calling Seufzer/Gegenliebe a "two-song cycle", but ultimately opts for the opera- and cantata-based models described below.) Beethoven sets the first stanza of Seufzer eines Ungeliebten" with recitative, of the kind widely used in opera. Following the recitative comes the main portion of "Seufzer eines Ungeliebten", in a leisurely 3/4 rhythm, marked andantino. This main portion ends not with a tonic cadence, but a loud dominant chord with fermata, making it clear that more is to come. Without pause there follows Beethoven's setting of "Gegenliebe", in 2/4 time with a faster tempo (allegretto).

Cooper (1996) has put forth a distinction among Beethoven's songs: some are "folk-like", with each stanza given a fairly simple setting; others involve a "dramatic, even operatic approach"; Seufzer/Gegenliebe falls in the latter category. Orrey, pursuing the same idea, notes that in Italian opera a soloist often would sing a recitative followed by a bipartite aria consisting of a slow passage, the cavatina, followed by a final faster section, the cabaletta; the three portions of Seufzer/Gegenliebecorrespond to these three standard sections.

Cooper later offered a slight different analogy: the work is a "double song" set in the form of a "miniature Italian cantata". Historically, cantata and oratorio arias tended to follow operatic models. The use of term "cantata" for a solo vocal work with piano would have been familiar in Beethoven's time; his contemporaneous song "Adelaide", likewise operatic in style, was first published as a "cantata". (Note: See "Adelaide" for original title page.)

The key structure of Seufzer/Gegenliebe is centered on the tonality of C. The recitative is in C minor, the rest of "Seufzer" mostly in E-flat major (the relative major of C minor), coming to a close on C minor again, and "Gegenliebe" is in C major. (Note: Pilcher observes that Florestan's scene in Fidelio follows the same pattern, centered in this case on F.) The shift from stormy C minor to exultant C major was a tonal pattern Beethoven would adopt again later on, in the Fifth Symphony (1808) and the last piano sonata (1822).

== Influences on later work by Beethoven ==
The operatic style of Seufzer/Gegenliebe, and the fact that Beethoven never published it, suggests regarding it as a sort of preparation for more prominent works he created later on. Thus, Orrey sees Seufzer/Gegenliebe as an early preparation for Beethoven's concert aria "Ah! perfido" (1796), a more extended work written for soprano solo and orchestra. "Ah! perfido" shares the recitative-cavatina-cabaletta structure of Seufzer/Gegenliebe, and its cavatina section is likewise in E-flat and set in 3/4 time. As with Seufzer/Gegenliebe, the text deals with "thwarted love". Further on, Pilcher notes that Beethoven deployed the recitative-cavatina-cabaletta structure of Seufzer/Gegenliebe in his only opera Fidelio (1805–1814); it is used for the major solo scenes of his protagonists, Leonore and Florestan. (Note: Thus, at the start of the second act Florestan sings first of his despair in recitative in "Gott! Welch' Dunkel hier" [God! What darkness here], then his sense of duty in "In des Lebens Frühlingstagen" [In the spring days of life] (tempo adagio, 3/4), and finally experiences an ecstatic hallucination of Leonore as a rescuing angel ("Und spür' ich nicht linde ... Luft" [And do I not sense a gentle ... breeze], poco allegro, common time). Leonore's act 1 scene is similar in structure.)

The melody of "Gegenliebe", given below, continued to evolve in Beethoven's mind as his career progressed.

Main theme of "Gegenliebe"

Only slightly altered (with masculine rather than feminine endings), the theme appears in Beethoven's Choral Fantasy opus 80 for piano, chorus and orchestra, from 1808. The Choral Fantasy version is in turn widely viewed as a foreshadowing of the "Ode to Joy" melody employed in the final movement of the Ninth Symphony (1824).

== Notes and references ==
Notes

Sources

- Attridge, Derek (1982). The Rhythms of English Poetry. Burnt Mill: Longman. ISBN 9780582551053.
- Cooper, Barry (1996), Ludwig van Beethoven: Lieder (program notes for the album An die ferne Geliebte: Beethoven Lieder, with Peter Schreier (tenor) and András Schiff (piano)), Decca Records
- Cooper, Barry (2008). Beethoven. Oxford: Oxford University Press. ISBN 9780195313314.
- Orrey, Leslie (1971). "The Songs". In Denis Arnold; Nigel Fortune (eds.). The Beethoven Companion. London: Faber & Faber. pp. 411–442. ISBN 9780571103188.
- Pilcher, Matthew (2012). Structure, rhetoric, imagery: Intersections of literary expression and musical narrative in the vocal works of Beethoven (Ph.D. dissertation). University of Manchester.
- Ronyak, Jennifer (May 2016). "Beethoven within grasp: The nineteenth-century reception of 'Adelaide'". Music & Letters. 97 (2): 249–276. doi:10.1093/ml/gcw046. JSTOR 44163500.
- Swafford, Jan (2014). Beethoven: Anguish and Triumph. Mariner Books.
- Youens, Susan (2008), Program notes for Ludwig van Beethoven (1770–1827) Lieder und Gesänge, with Dame Ann Murray (mezzo-soprano), Roderick Williams (baritone), and Iain Burnside (piano), Hyperion Records
- Zimmer, Mark S. (Winter 2016). "Liebe: the discovery and identification of a Beethoven song lost since 1822". The Musical Times. 157 (1937): 13–34. JSTOR 44862785.
