= Beethoven and his contemporaries =

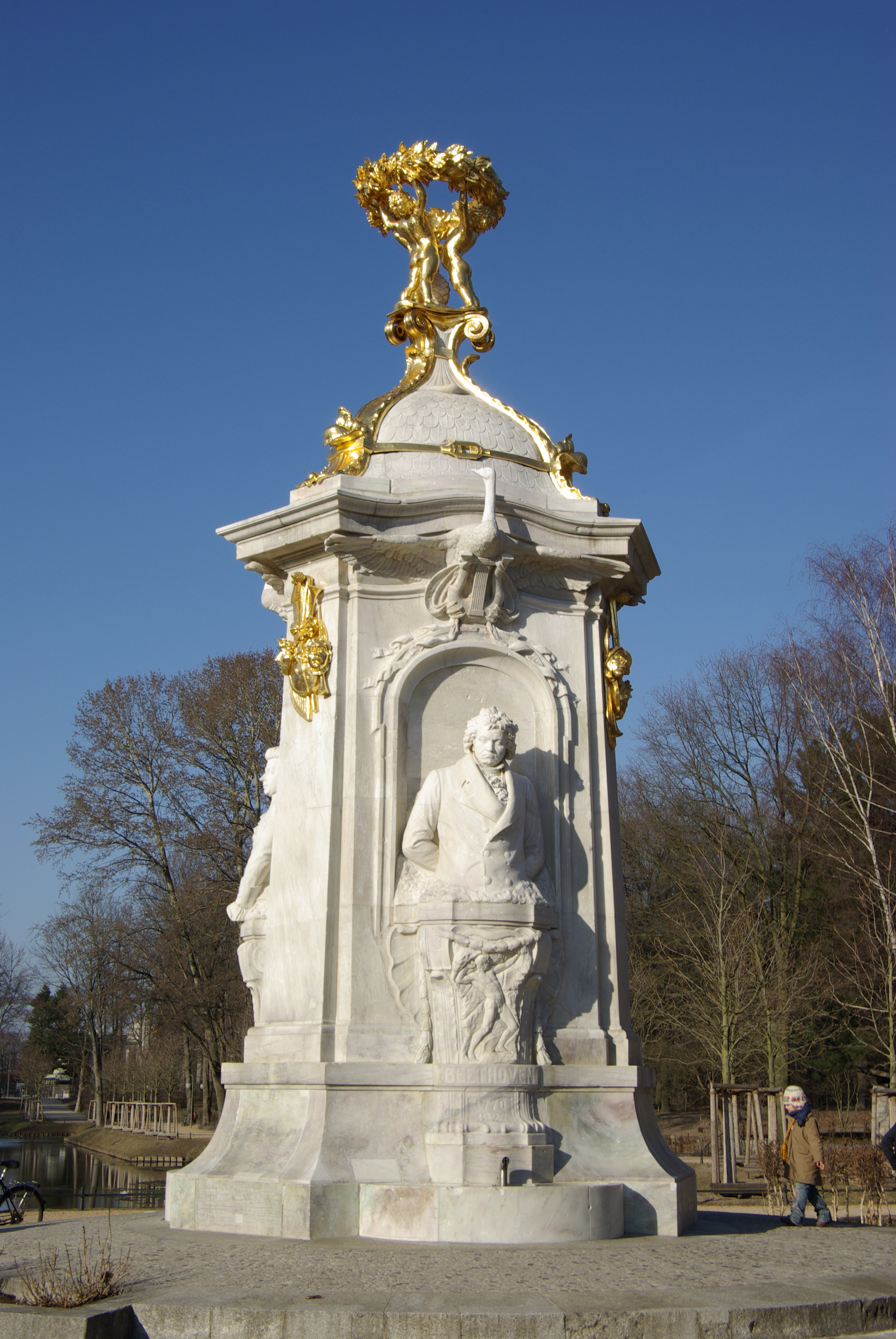
Beethoven-Haydn-Mozart Memorial in Berlin

During the course of his lifetime, Ludwig van Beethoven (1770–1827) established relationships with many of his musical contemporaries. Beethoven was notoriously temperamental, eccentric and difficult to get along with; the history of his many relationships is replete with arguments, misunderstandings, and reconciliations. Beethoven had well-known quarrels with his one-time teachers, Joseph Haydn and Antonio Salieri, with the piano virtuoso and composer Johann Nepomuk Hummel, and the German composer Carl Maria von Weber. Conversely, he regarded Franz Schubert positively, praising the latter's compositions.

== Luigi Cherubini ==
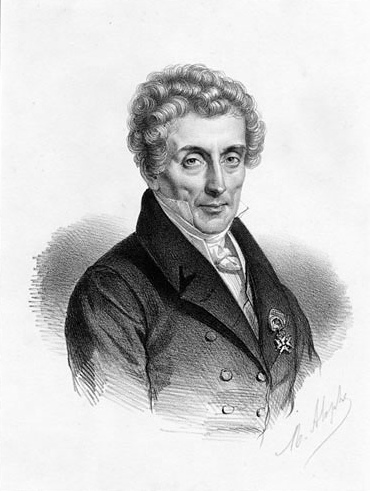
L. Cherubini, c. 1850

Beethoven met the composer Luigi Cherubini on the latter's journey to Vienna in 1805. Cherubini, a longtime resident of Paris, was invited to mount a production of his opera Die Tage der Gefahr (or Der Wasserträger) after the success of his 1791 opera Lodoïska, which was staged by Emanuel Schikaneder on 23 March 1803 at the Theater an der Wien. Cherubini's time in Vienna was generally unhappy, but he did have the opportunity to meet Beethoven. Cherubini was in attendance for the first performances of Beethoven's opera Fidelio, to which he reacted sneeringly. He also described Beethoven's piano style as "rough", and more famously the man himself as "an unlicked bear cub".

== Johann Wolfgang von Goethe ==
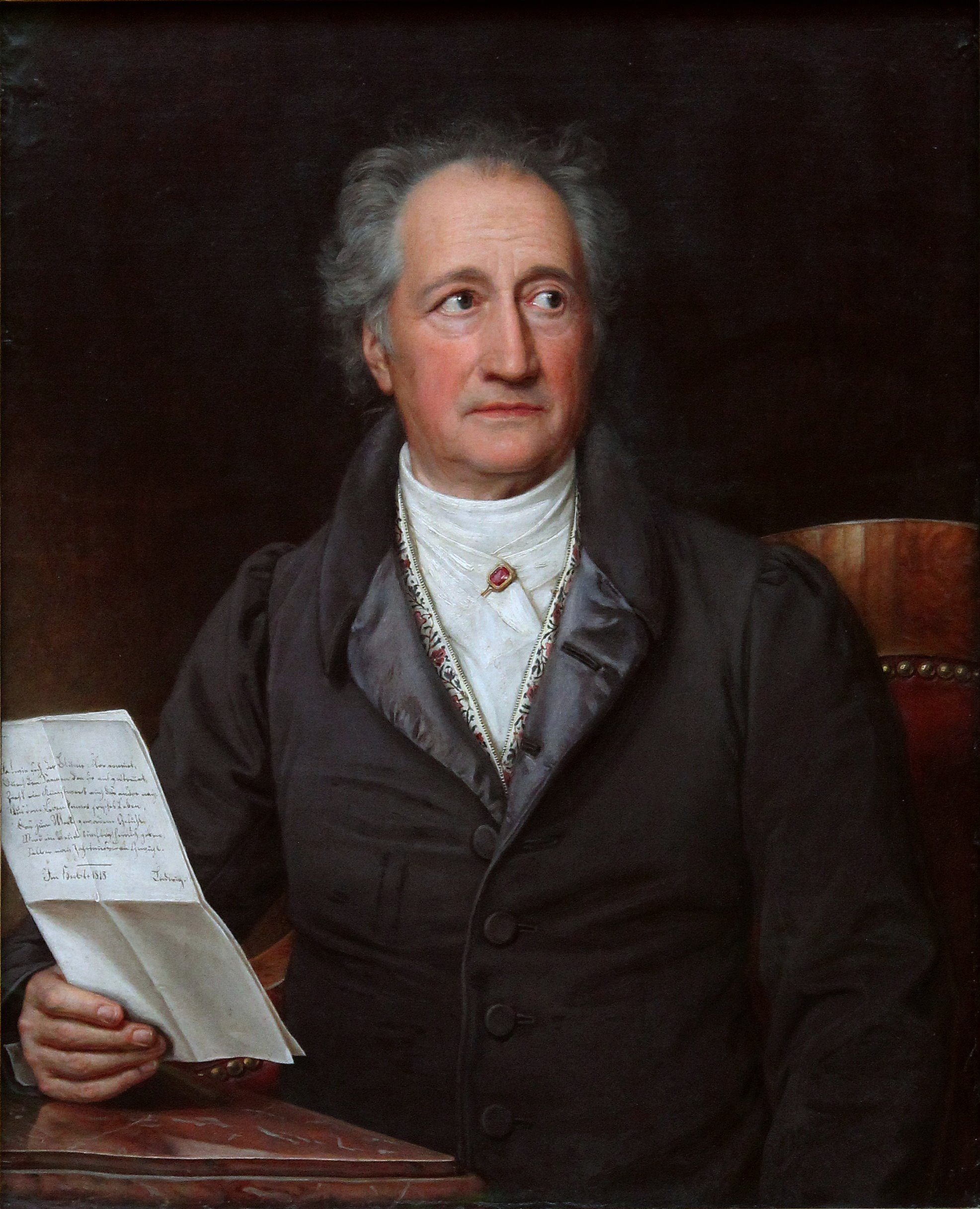
Goethe, 1828

Beethoven had already read and admired Johann Wolfgang von Goethe's works during his youth in Bonn, long before their first meeting in 1812. His first Goethe settings were produced around 1790. Beethoven announced his music to Egmont in a letter to the poet in the spring of 1811 with the following words: "I am only able to approach you with the greatest veneration [and] with an inexpressibly deep feeling for your glorious creations." He had already set 18 texts by Goethe, and two others were to follow. Goethe therefore occupies a privileged position in Beethoven's vocal works. Beethoven met Goethe at Teplitz in 1812, and a possibly apocryphal story by Bettina von Arnim described Beethoven refusing to bow to visiting royalty, much to Goethe's consternation.

== Joseph Haydn ==
J. Haydn, 1791

Perhaps the most important relationship in Beethoven's early life, and certainly the most famous, was the young pianist's tutorship under the Austrian composer Joseph Haydn. Beethoven studied with a number of composers and teachers in the period 1792–95, including Antonio Salieri and Johann Georg Albrechtsberger. However, of all Beethoven's teachers, Haydn enjoyed the greatest reputation, having just returned from his first successful voyage to London. Possibly as early as his first trip to London in 1790, Haydn agreed to take on Beethoven as a student.

There is evidence that Haydn assigned his student composition exercises based on the Fux text Gradus ad Parnassum. During the course of the year, however, the relationship between the two men soured. According to contemporary accounts, the issue surfaced most notably upon the publication of Beethoven's first compositions, the Op. 1 piano trios. Wishing to assist the young composer, Haydn suggested that Beethoven include the phrase "pupil of Haydn" underneath his name in order to garner advantage from Haydn's considerable fame. There is generally strong evidence of Haydn's goodwill toward Beethoven, including an interest in taking his pupil with him on his second London voyage, and the personal missives Haydn sent to Beethoven's early patron, Maximilian Francis of Austria, Elector of Cologne.

Beethoven, however, seems to have harbored ill-will toward Haydn during various points of his life. At the suggestion that he include the phrase "pupil of Haydn", Beethoven bristled. According to the account left by Ferdinand Ries, "Beethoven was unwilling to, because, as he said, although he had some instruction from Haydn, he had never learned anything from him." The bad feelings produced by the Op. 1 Trios were compounded upon their first performance. Haydn, present in the audience, is reported to have recommended against the publication of the C minor Trio (Op. 1, No. 3) since he suspected the music would not gain public acceptance. Beethoven considered the C minor the best of the trios and interpreted Haydn's advice as an indication of his envy.

Despite this, however, Beethoven and Haydn remained on relatively good terms until Haydn's death in 1809. Beethoven attended the concert in honor of Haydn's 76th birthday, and it is said that he "knelt down before Haydn and fervently kissed the hands and forehead of his old teacher".

Haydn's towering reputation in Vienna made it hard for Beethoven to be openly antagonistic. However, Haydn was also genuinely admiring of Beethoven's compositions, a trait that usually succeeded in earning Beethoven's goodwill.

In his renowned biography of Beethoven, Maynard Solomon notes that, in his later years, "Beethoven unfailingly referred to his old master in terms of reverence, regarding him as the equal" of Mozart and Bach.

== Johann Nepomuk Hummel ==
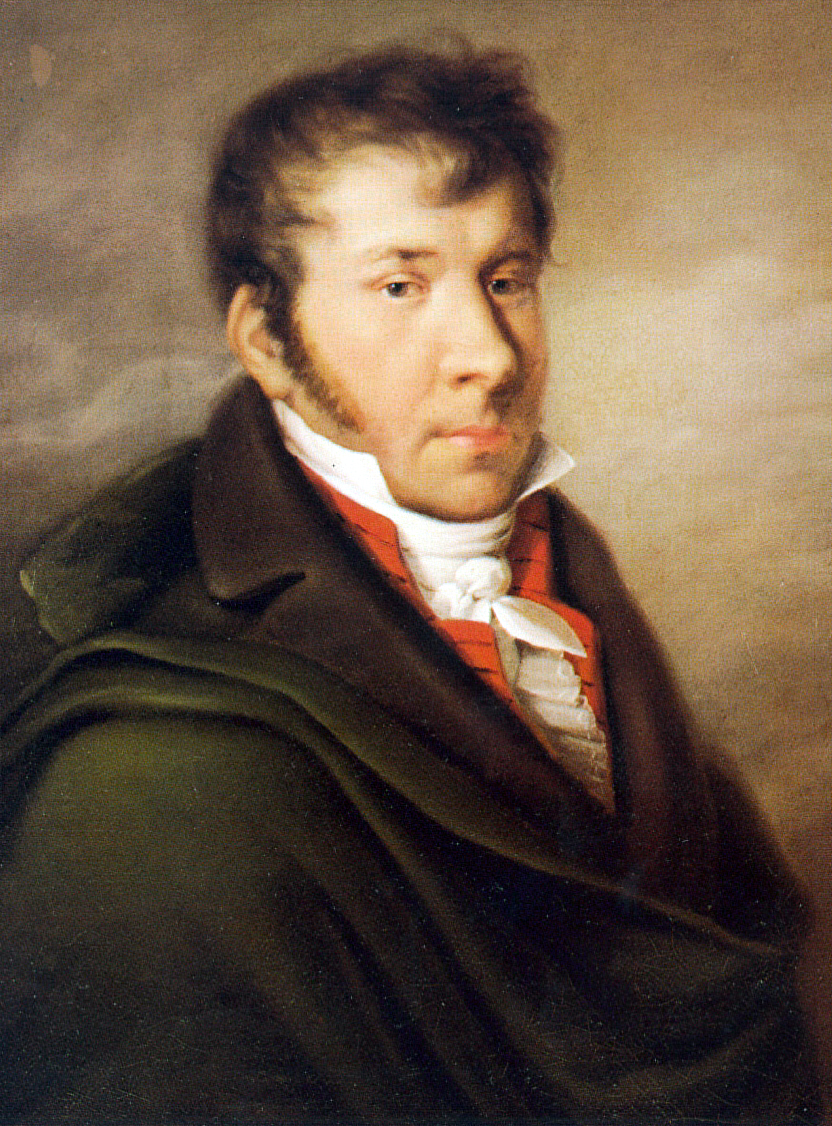
J. N. Hummel

Johann Nepomuk Hummel, born in 1778, was a fixture in the Viennese musical world. A child prodigy and former pupil of Mozart, Hummel was renowned for his incredible virtuosity at the keyboard and legendary prowess at improvisation. Alongside Beethoven, he was widely considered the finest performer of his day. For many years, Hummel enjoyed a close friendship with Beethoven.

Several incidents, however, marred their relationship. In one famous incident, Beethoven was invited by Prince Nikolaus II Esterhazy to write a mass for his wife in 1807. Beethoven agreed and produced the Mass in C, which was performed at the prince's estate in Eisenstadt. Hummel was at the time the Kapellmeister, having been appointed Haydn's successor to the Esterhazy court. The performance did not go well, and the prince is purported to have made a barbed remark to Beethoven afterwards. According to Schindler, Hummel laughed at the prince's words, compounding the always-sensitive Beethoven's feelings of humiliation and persecution. Beethoven promptly left Eisenstadt and carried the grudge for years afterward. This incident, however, likely did not prompt the eventual falling-out between the two men.

A more likely source of contention between them was artistic. Hummel was well known for his keyboard arrangements of Beethoven's works, particularly his symphonies. Beethoven disliked Hummel's style of performance and composition, and, according to Ignaz Moscheles, objected to Hummel's arrangements. Some time in the late 1810s, disagreement surfaced, the exact cause of which is unknown, but which may well have centered on discord over Hummel's arrangements of Beethoven's music.

Hummel spent most of the 1820s at the Weimar Court, where he was a friend of Johann Wolfgang von Goethe, and did not see Beethoven again until a remarkable reconciliation took place between the two men at Beethoven's deathbed. Hummel, hearing of Beethoven's serious illness, travelled from Weimar to Vienna to visit his erstwhile friend. According to the account left by Hummel's then-student Ferdinand Hiller, who accompanied his teacher, Hummel may have been motivated by more than compassion. Hummel solicited Beethoven's signature upon a petition he was taking to the Bundestag in order to protect his compositions (and those of others) from illegal copying. All told, Hummel visited Beethoven three times while he was on his deathbed, the last being on 23 March 1827, just three days before his death, and was present at his funeral.

== Franz Liszt ==
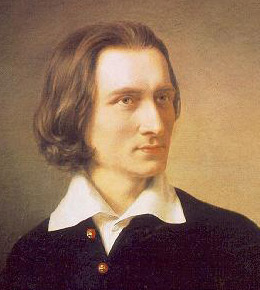
F. Liszt

On 13 April 1823, the eleven-year-old Hungarian pianist Franz Liszt (1811–1886) performed in Vienna. It was said that the 53-year-old Beethoven gave him a kiss – the so-called Weihekuss, or 'kiss of consecration' – for his marvellous playing. This is unlikely to be true, as Beethoven was profoundly deaf by this time. A more reasonable account of the Beethoven kiss event is reported in the reminiscences of the pianist Ilka Horovitz-Barnay:

"The most memorable time I experienced with Liszt was when he told me of his meeting with Beethoven. 'I was about eleven years old', he began, 'when my highly esteemed teacher Czerny introduced me to Beethoven. He had long before told him about me and had asked him to hear me play. But Beethoven had aversions against prodigies and for a long time refused to hear me. Finally though he was persuaded by my indefatigable teacher Czerny and said: "Then for God's sake – bring the little rascal".

"'It was one morning about ten o'clock when we entered the two small rooms of the Schwarzspanierhaus, where Beethoven lived. I was somewhat embarrassed – but Czerny kindly encouraged me. Beethoven was sitting by the window at a long narrow table working. For a moment he looked at us with a serious face, said a couple of quick words to Czerny but turned silent as my dear teacher signaled to me to go to the piano.

"'First I played a small piece of Ries [Ferdinand Ries, another pupil of Beethoven]. When I had finished Beethoven asked if I could play a fugue by Bach. I chose the C minor fugue from The Well-Tempered Clavier. "Can you transpose this fugue?" Beethoven asked.

"'Fortunately I could. After the finishing chord I looked up. Beethoven's deep glowing eyes rested upon me – but suddenly a light smile flew over his otherwise serious face. He approached me and stroked me several times over my head with affection.

"'"Well – I'll be blowed" he whispered, "such a little devil".

"'Suddenly my courage rose: "May I play one of your pieces?" I asked with audacity. Beethoven nodded with a smile. I played the first movement of his C major piano concerto [No. 1]. When I had finished Beethoven stretched out his arms, kissed me on my forehead and said in a soft voice:

"'"You go on ahead. You are one of the lucky ones! It will be your destiny to bring joy and delight to many people and that is the greatest happiness one can achieve"'.

"Liszt told me this with great emotion; his voice trembled but you could feel what divine joy these simple words had given him. Never did Liszt – the human being – make a greater impression on me. The flamboyant man-of-the-world, the revered artist was gone; this great moment he had experienced in his childhood still resounded in his soul. For a little while he was silent – then he said quietly:

"'This was the proudest moment in my life – the inauguration to my life as artist. I tell this very rarely – and only to special friends.'"

This story is somewhat more convincing, although Beethoven was just as deaf in 1822 as in 1823. It is certainly possible that Beethoven was able to appraise Liszt's playing by observing his fingerings and feeling the vibrations of the piano with his hand. However, at the time the meeting supposedly occurred, Beethoven was not residing in the Schwarzspanierhaus; he didn't move there until late 1825. But when Liszt told this story, he was in his latter years, and his memory may have been a little faulty, if the story itself was not a confabulation.

== Wolfgang Amadeus Mozart ==
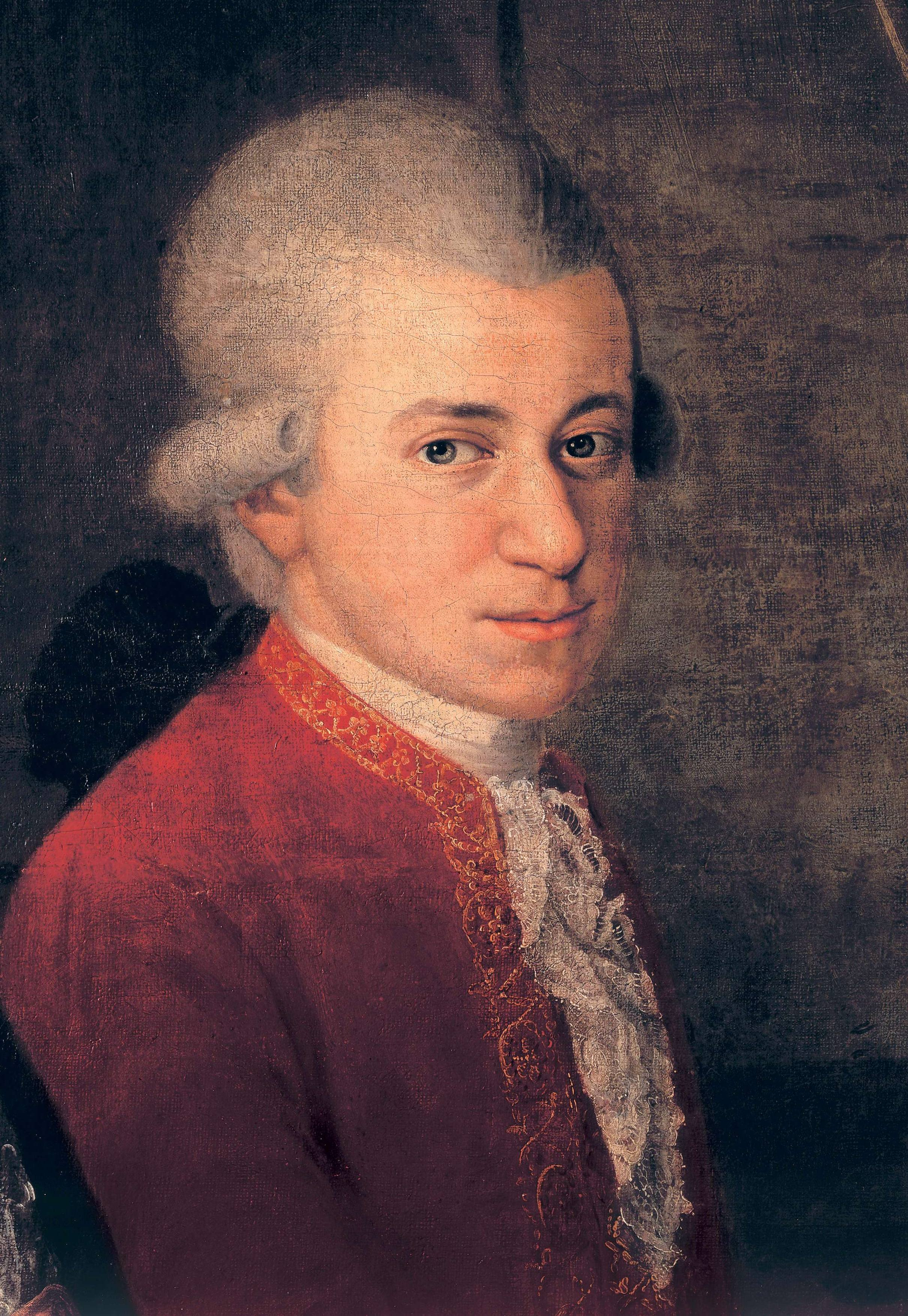
W. A. Mozart in 1781

Wolfgang Amadeus Mozart (1756–1791) was already an accomplished and renowned composer in Vienna when the then 16-year-old Beethoven first visited the city in 1787. The two may have met during Beethoven's six-month stay there, although there are no contemporary documents that provide any evidence for this. According to secondary accounts given by writer Otto Jahn, Beethoven was taken to meet Mozart and played for him. Beethoven may also have received lessons from Mozart.

The uncertainty over their meeting notwithstanding, Beethoven was certainly aware of Mozart's work and was heavily influenced by it. For example, the third movement of Beethoven's 5th Symphony has an opening theme that is very similar to that of the fourth movement of Mozart's 40th Symphony. Beethoven wrote cadenzas (WoO 58) to the first and third movements of Mozart's Piano Concerto in D minor.

== Gioachino Rossini ==
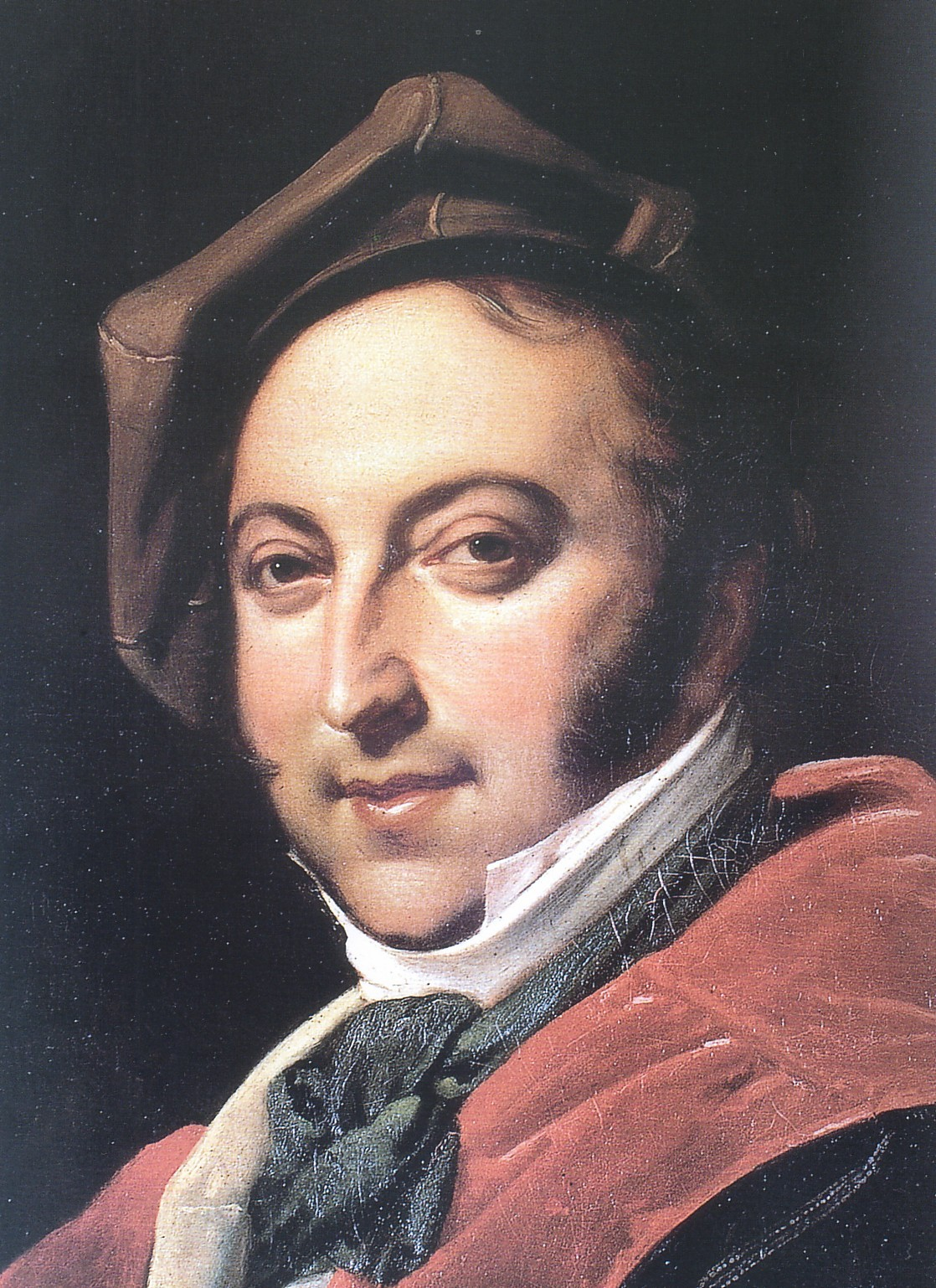
G. Rossini, 1820

Gioachino Rossini (1792–1868) was an Italian composer known for his numerous operas including The Barber of Seville and William Tell. When Rossini visited Vienna, he made several attempts to meet Beethoven, who was then 51 and in failing health. Finally, Rossini was able to arrange a meeting with Beethoven through the help of Giuseppe Carpani, an Italian poet living in Vienna. According to various accounts, Beethoven recognized Rossini and complimented him on The Barber of Seville, adding that he should never try to write anything other than opera buffa (comedy operas) as that would be against his (Rossini's) nature. When Carpani reminded Beethoven that Rossini had already composed several serious operas, Beethoven is reported to have said, "Yes, I looked at them. Opera seria (serious opera) is ill-suited to the Italians. You do not know how to deal with real drama."

== Franz Schubert ==
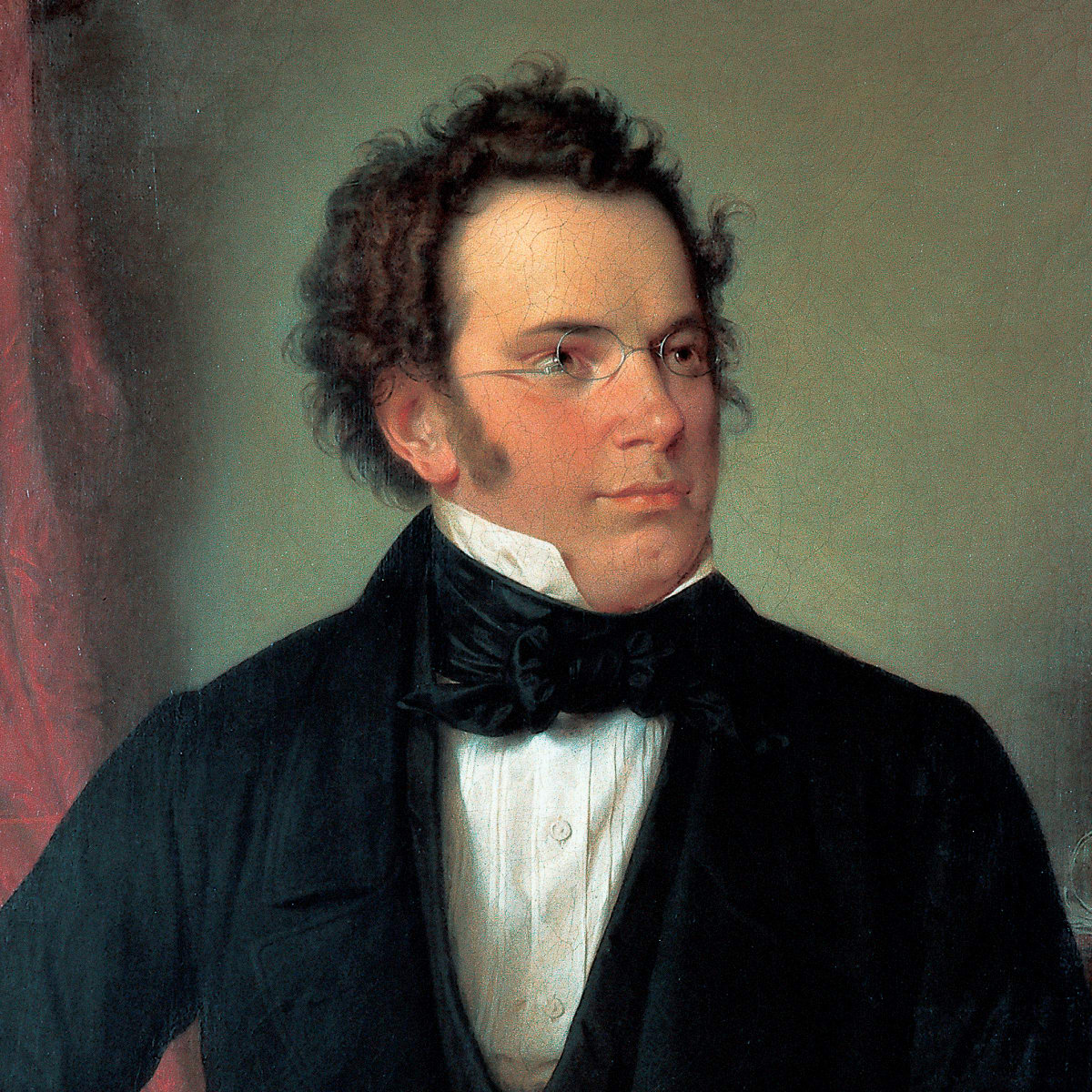
F. Schubert, 1825

Franz Schubert (1797–1828) lived most of his short life in Vienna, during the height of Beethoven's popularity. He was exposed to Beethoven's music from an early age, and several of his works contain thematic resemblance to similar works of Beethoven. Even though both Schubert and Beethoven resided in the same city, and Schubert held Beethoven in the highest of esteem, they moved, for the most part, in different social circles for most of that time. Their first meeting was apparently in 1822, when Schubert, accompanied by the publisher Anton Diabelli, visited Beethoven. Schubert had dedicated a set of Variations on a French Song (Op. 10, D. 624) to Beethoven, and wanted to present the dedicatee with a copy. Schubert was apparently nervous during the interview, and nearly lost all sense of composure when the older man pointed out a minor problem in the work. This story is recounted by Anton Schindler, and is of unknown authenticity, as Schindler is known to be an unreliable biographer of Beethoven. Schubert's friend Josef Hüttenbrenner claims that Beethoven was not home when Schubert called, and the variations were left with the house staff. However, Johann Friedrich Rochlitz, the publisher of the Allgemeine Musikalische Zeitung, recounts an 1822 meeting of his with Schubert, in which Schubert claims to have discussed Rochlitz with Beethoven, and described other details of a meeting.

When Beethoven was on his deathbed in 1827, Schindler, to give Beethoven some distractions, gave him manuscripts for a number of Schubert's songs. Beethoven was, according to Schindler, astonished at the quantity and quality of what he saw, claiming that "Truly in Schubert there is the divine spark." Schubert would visit Beethoven on his death bed more than once. On one visit, when Schubert called with Anselm Hüttenbrenner, Beethoven remarked, "You, Anselm have my mind, but Franz has my soul." Schubert would serve as a torch-bearer at Beethoven's funeral.

== Johann Sedlatzek ==
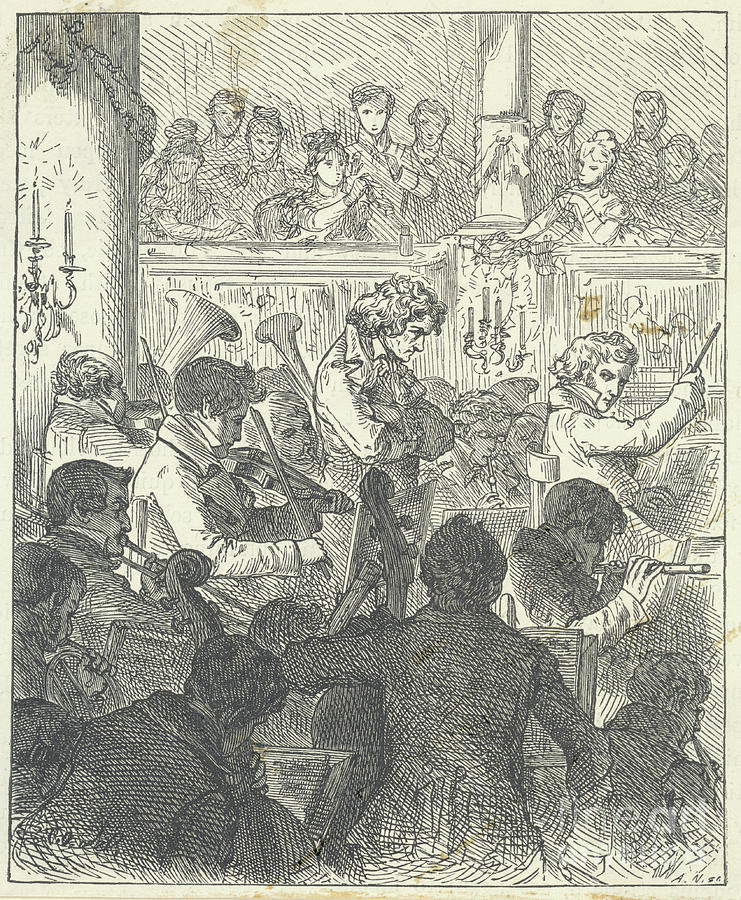
Premiere of Beethoven's Ninth Symphony. Johann Sedlatzek is the principal flutist.

Johann Sedlatzek (1789–1866) was a flute virtuoso of the 19th century born in the Silesian city of Oberglogau, now Głogówek, Poland, who spent most of his life performing in Vienna and London. Beethoven first met Sedlatzek during his visit to Silesia in 1806 at the Castle of Count Franz von Oppersdorff where Sedlatzek played in the Royal Court Orchestra.

The Count was known to be a passionate patron of music who not only commissioned Beethoven's Symphony No. 4 which was dedicated to him, but who also discovered the talent of Johann Sedlatzek while the boy was working in the family trade as a tailor, playing flute as a hobby. Oppersdorff recruited the young tailor/musician to play in his court orchestra, allowing Johann the opportunity to perform for Beethoven during the Master's stay in Silesia in the fall of 1806. The introduction of Sedlatzek to Beethoven at this time marked the beginning of a musical partnership which would endure throughout Beethoven's final years.

Johann Sedlatzek was the principal flutist at the Kärntnertortheater in Vienna during the world premiere performance of Beethoven's Symphony No. 9 on 7 May 1824 under the direction of Beethoven. As witnessed by the English conductor Sir George Thomas Smart, who visited Beethoven's home in Vienna in 1825, Sedlatzek was a member of Beethoven's inner circle, which included, according to Sir George's letters, such notable musicians as Czerny, Lincke, Schlesinger, and Schuppanzigh and according to some sources Schubert.

Beethoven apparently held Sedlatzek's musicianship in high regard, as evidenced by the personal letters of recommendation Sedlatzek carried with him during his solo tour of Paris in 1826. In a letter directed to French violinist and composer Rudolph Kreutzer (1766–1831), Beethoven called Sedlatzek "...a most distinguished artist". In a letter presented to Luigi Cherubini (1760–1842), the Italian composer who lived most of his life in France, Beethoven said of Sedlatzek: "I am convinced of his esteem as an artist worthy of my name, and hope for a favorable welcome from you. Accept him with the highest assurance..."

The association with Beethoven continued as far as Johann's grandson, Ludwig Sedlaczek (1875 in Vienna – 1965 in the US), who also became a musician and composer. The young Ludwig learned the craft of music by practising on a piano once owned and played by Beethoven.

Beethoven's visit to Silesia in 1806 is celebrated annually with the Silesian Beethoven Music Festival held each autumn in Głogówek, Poland. The 2012 edition of the Beethoven Festival in Głogówek featured performances of several compositions by Johann Sedlatzek which had been lost for nearly 200 years until being discovered in London archives in the Spring of 2012. These previously lost works were performed for the first time since the 19th century on 6 October 2012 by flutist Elzbieta Wolenska and pianist Elzbieta Zawadzka to honor Sedlatzek's mentor and contemporary, Ludwig van Beethoven, in the city of their first meeting.
