= Joseph Lanzedelly the Elder =

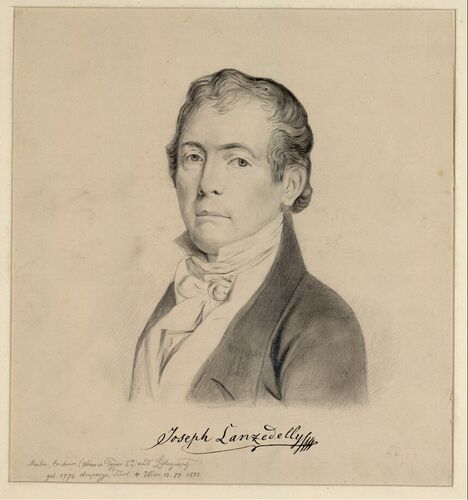
Self-portrait, c.1810

Joseph Lanzedelly the Elder (also Lancedelly; 6 February 1772 – 5 December 1831) was an Austrian lithographer.

== Life ==
He was born in Cortina d'Ampezzo (now in northern Italy), the son of a watchmaker. He studied at the Venice Academy of Fine Arts, and from 1806 at the Academy of Fine Arts in Vienna. He became interested in lithography soon after the invention of the process, and had his early watercolour portraits printed by Adolph Friedrich Kunike.

Lanzedelly's work is regarded as influential in the spread of lithography in Vienna. He made genre prints, influenced by the work of English and particularly French engravers such as Philibert-Louis Debucourt, and he also produced portraits.

His sons Karl (1815–1865) and Joseph (1807–1879) were also lithographers.

== Works ==
Genre prints include Darstellungen gesellschaftlicher Spiele ("Representations of social games"), on six sheets; and Wiener Scenen ("Viennese scenes"), on 12 sheets. His lithographs can be seen in Vienna at the Albertina and at the Vienna Museum.
