= Symphony No. 6 (Beethoven) =

1808 symphony by Ludwig van Beethoven

- Pastoral
- by Ludwig van Beethoven
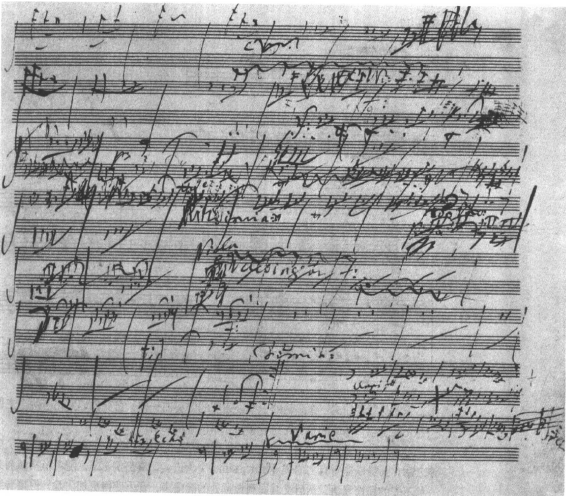
- Part of a sketch by Beethoven for the symphony
- Key: F major
- Opus: 68
- Composed: 1802–1808
- Dedication: Prince Lobkowitz; Count Razumovsky
- Duration: c. 40 minutes
- Movements: 5
- Scoring: Orchestra

Premiere
- Date: 22 December 1808
- Location: Theater an der Wien, Vienna
- Conductor: Ludwig van Beethoven

The Symphony No. 6 in F major, Op. 68, also known as the Pastoral Symphony (German: Pastorale), is a symphony composed by Ludwig van Beethoven and completed in 1808. One of Beethoven's few works containing explicitly programmatic content, the symphony was first performed alongside his Fifth Symphony in the Theater an der Wien on 22 December 1808 in a four-hour concert.

== Background ==
Beethoven was a lover of nature who spent a great deal of his time on walks in the country. He frequently left Vienna to work in rural locations. He said that the Sixth Symphony is "more the expression of feeling than painting", a point underlined by the title of the first movement.

The first sketches of the Pastoral Symphony appeared in 1802. It was composed simultaneously with Beethoven's more famous Fifth Symphony. Both symphonies were premiered in a long and under-rehearsed concert in the Theater at der Wien in Vienna on 22 December 1808.

Frank A. D'Accone suggested that Beethoven borrowed the programmatic ideas (a shepherd's pipe, birds singing, streams flowing, and a thunderstorm) for his five-movement narrative layout from Le Portrait musical de la Nature ou Grande Symphonie, which was composed by Justin Heinrich Knecht (1752–1817) in 1784.

== Instrumentation ==
The symphony is scored for the following instrumentation:

Woodwinds

1 piccolo (fourth movement only)
2 flutes
2 oboes
2 clarinets in B♭
2 bassoons

Brass

2 horns in F and B♭
2 trumpets in C and E♭ (third, fourth, and fifth movements only)
2 trombones (alto and tenor, fourth and fifth movements only)

Percussion

Timpani in F and C (fourth movement only)

Strings

Violins I, II
Violas
Cellos
Double basses

== Form ==
The symphony has five, rather than the four movements typical of symphonies preceding Beethoven's time, although there are no pauses between the last three movements. Beethoven wrote a programmatic title at the beginning of each movement:

No.	German title	English translation	Tempo marking	Duration	Key
I.	Erwachen heiterer Empfindungen bei der Ankunft auf dem Lande	Awakening of cheerful feelings on arrival in the countryside	Allegro ma non troppo	7–13 minutes	F major
II.	Szene am Bach	Scene by the brook	Andante molto mosso	9–13 minutes	B♭ major
III.	Lustiges Zusammensein der Landleute	Merry gathering of country folk	Allegro	2–6 minutes	F major
IV.	Gewitter, Sturm	Thunder, Storm	Allegro	2–3 minutes	F minor
V.	Hirtengesang. Frohe und dankbare Gefühle nach dem Sturm	Shepherd's song. Cheerful and thankful feelings after the storm	Allegretto	7–11 minutes	F major

A performance of the work lasts about 35-46 minutes, depending on the choice of tempo and whether the repeats in the 1st and 3rd movements are omitted.

=== I. Allegro ma non troppo ===
First movement
Performed by the Skidmore College Orchestra

The symphony begins with a placid and cheerful movement depicting the composer's feelings as he arrives in the country. The movement, in 2/4 meter, is in sonata form, and its motifs are extensively developed. At several points, Beethoven builds up orchestral texture by multiple repetitions of very short motifs. Yvonne Frindle commented that "the infinite repetition of pattern in nature [is] conveyed through rhythmic cells, its immensity through sustained pure harmonies."

=== II. Andante molto mosso ===
Second movement
Performed by the Skidmore College Orchestra. Music courtesy of Musopen

The second movement is another sonata-form movement, this time in 12/8 and in the key of B♭ major, the subdominant of the main key of the work. It begins with the strings playing a motif that imitates flowing water. The cello section is divided, with just two players playing the flowing-water notes on muted instruments, and the remaining cellos playing mostly pizzicato notes together with the double basses.

Towards the end is a cadenza for woodwind instruments that imitates bird calls. Beethoven helpfully identified the bird species in the score: nightingale (flute), quail (oboe), and cuckoo (two clarinets).

=== III. Scherzo Allegro – Trio – Tempo I – Presto ===
Third movement
Performed by the Skidmore College Orchestra. Music courtesy of Musopen

The third movement is a scherzo in 3/4 time, which depicts country folk dancing and reveling. It is in F major, returning to the main key of the symphony. The movement is an altered version of the usual form for scherzi, in that the trio appears twice rather than just once, and the third appearance of the scherzo theme is truncated. Perhaps to accommodate this rather spacious arrangement, Beethoven did not mark the usual internal repeats of the scherzo and the trio. Theodor Adorno identifies this scherzo as the model for the scherzos by Anton Bruckner.

The final return of the theme conveys a riotous atmosphere with a faster tempo. The movement ends abruptly, leading without a pause into the fourth movement.

=== IV. Allegro ===
Fourth movement
Performed by the Skidmore College Orchestra. Music courtesy of Musopen

The fourth movement, in F minor and 4/4 time, is the part where Beethoven calls for the largest instrumentation in the entire piece. It depicts a violent thunderstorm with painstaking realism, building from distant thunder (quiet tremolos on cellos and basses) and a few drops of rain (eighth-note passages on the violins) to a great climax with loud thunder (timpani), lightning (piccolo), high winds (swirling arpeggio-like passages on the strings), and heavy downpours of rain (16-note tremolo passages on the strings). With the addition of the trombones later in the movement, Beethoven makes an even more tremendous effect. The storm eventually passes, with an occasional peal of thunder still heard in the distance. An ascending scale passage on the solo flute represents a rainbow. There is a seamless transition into the final movement. This movement parallels Mozart's procedure in his String Quintet in G minor K. 516 of 1787, which likewise prefaces a serene final movement with a long, emotionally stormy introduction.

=== V. Allegretto ===
Fifth movement
Performed by the Skidmore College Orchestra. Music courtesy of Musopen

The finale, which is in F major, is in 6/8 time. The movement is in sonata rondo form, in an Intro-[A-B-A]-C-[A-B-A]-Coda structure. Like many finales, this movement emphasizes a symmetrical eight-bar theme, in this case representing the shepherds' song of thanksgiving.

The final A section starts quietly and gradually builds to an ecstatic culmination for the full orchestra (minus piccolo and timpani) with the first violins playing very rapid triplet tremolo on a high F. There follows a fervent coda suggestive of prayer, marked by Beethoven pianissimo, sotto voce; most conductors slow the tempo for this passage. After a brief period of afterglow, the work ends with two emphatic F major chords.

== Critical commentary ==
Stephen Ledbetter suggests that the symphony is program music (as noted above) only in a fairly limited way:

One thing that aroused discussion of the new Symphony—a debate that lasted for decades—was the fact that Beethoven provided each movement of the work with a program, or literary guide to its meaning. His titles are really only brief images, just enough to suggest a setting. Many romantic composers and critics saw in this program a justification for the most abstruse kinds of storytelling in symphonic writing, but the program is not necessary for an understanding of the music as Beethoven finally left it, for there is nothing here that departs from expectation simply for narrative reasons.

He adds, "Much more important for an understanding of Beethoven’s view than the headings of the movements is the note that Beethoven caused to be printed in the program of the first performance: 'Pastoral Symphony, more an expression of feeling than painting.'"

== Cultural references ==
The full symphony is used in Disney's 1940 animated film Fantasia.
