= Umlauf =

Umlauf is an Austrian family name, found also in Moravia.

Notable people with the surname include:

- Ignaz Umlauf (1746-1796), Austrian composer, Kapellmeister of the emperor's German-language Singspiel theatre in Vienna
- Michael Umlauf (1781–1842), an Austrian composer, conductor (notably of Beethoven's 9th Symphony), and violinist, son of Ignaz Umlauf.
- Charles Umlauf (1911–1994), an American sculptor

Umlauf Sculpture Garden and Museum

- Klaas Heufer-Umlauf (1983) a German television host
- K.A. Umlauf, student of Engel, who gave a complete proof of Engel's theorem in his 1891 dissertation
