= Anton Haizinger =

Austrian opera singer

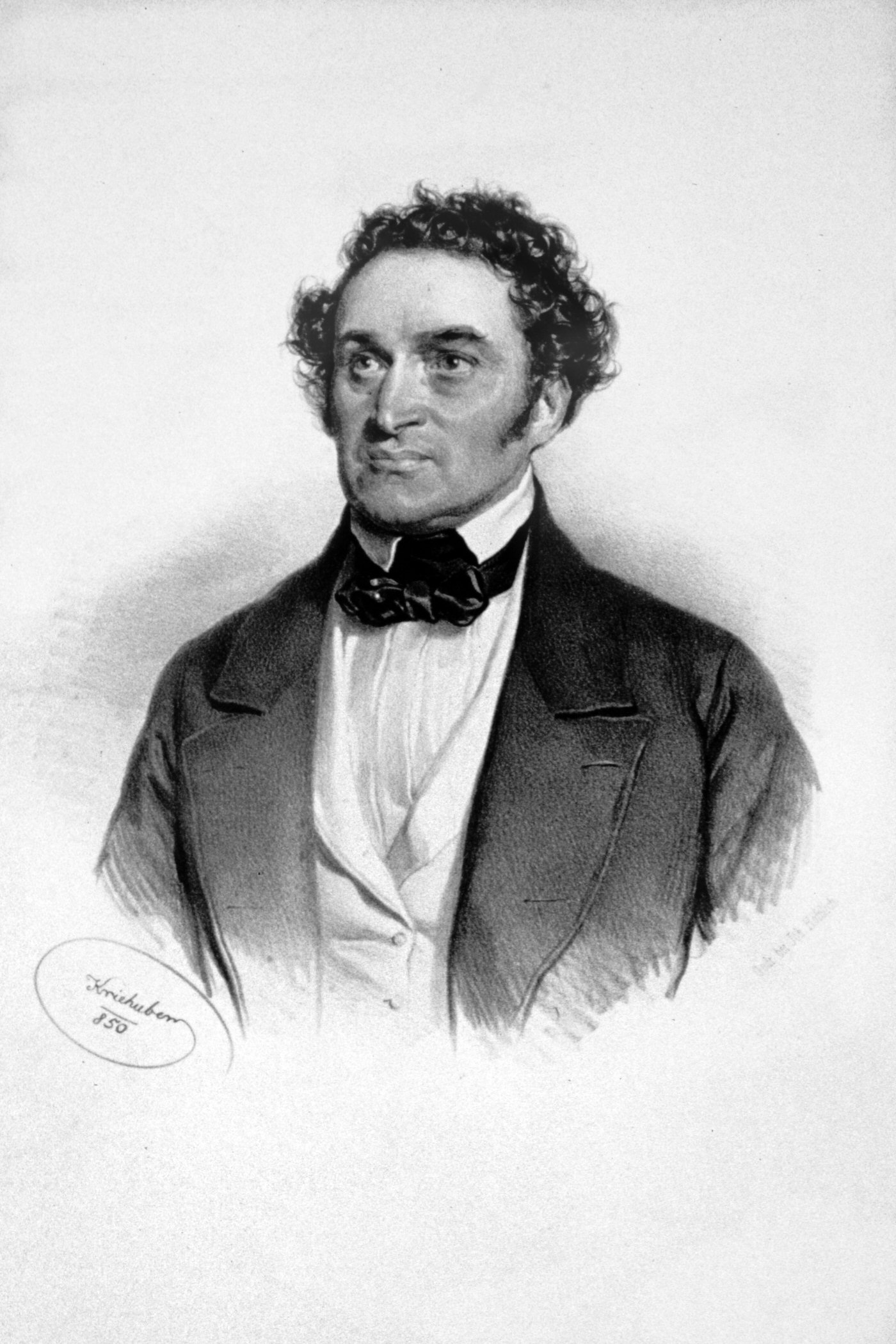
Anton Haizinger. Lithograph by Josef Kriehuber (1850).

Anton Haizinger (also spelled Haitzinger; 14 March 1796 – 31 December 1869) was an Austrian operatic tenor, performing in Vienna and later in Karlsruhe. He was a soloist in the premiere of Beethoven's Ninth Symphony.

== Early life ==
Haizinger was born in Wilfersdorf on 14 March 1796. His father, a teacher, gave him lessons in singing and piano, and he sang in church festivals; his outstanding voice became well known. However, he trained in Korneuburg to be a teacher, and became a teacher in Vienna. He continued musical studies, studying with Franz Volkert and others. Count Ferdinánd Pálffy, director of Theater an der Wien, heard Haizinger sing in concerts, and offered him an engagement at the theatre; Haizinger gave up teaching. He studied singing with Joseph Mozzati.

== Opera in Vienna ==
Haizinger's first roles at Theater an der Wien, in 1821, were in two operas by Rossini, as Gianetto in La gazza ladra and Lindoro in L'italiana in Algeri. He soon became well known in Vienna. The role of Adolar in Weber's opera Euryanthe, premiered in 1823 at the Theater am Kärntnertor, was created for him, and he was a soloist in the premiere in 1824 of Beethoven's Ninth Symphony at the same theatre. He continued studies with Antonio Salieri.

At this time, Italian opera was becoming more popular in Vienna than German opera, and he left the city in 1825, appearing in Prague, Bratislava, Frankfurt am Main and elsewhere.

== In Karlsruhe ==
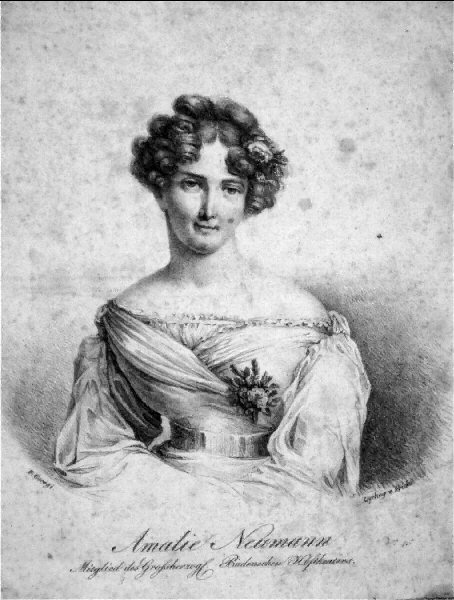
Amalie Haizinger, c.1830

He had an engagement at the Karlsruher Hoftheatre, and his performance impressed the theatre director, Joseph von Auffenberg: in 1826 he offered Haizinger a lifelong engagement at the theatre. Haizinger settled in Karlsruhe. In 1827, he married Amalie Neumann; they had a son, and there were two stepdaughters.

There were several tours: from 1828 to 1830 to Paris, and from 1831 to 1832 to London; he was in St. Petersburg in 1835.

In London in 1832, Haizinger, with a German opera company brought to the King's Theatre by Joseph August Röckel, played Florestan in Beethoven's opera Fidelio. The Earl of Mount Edgcumbe wrote that his voice was "very beautiful", but the critic Henry Chorley described him as "a meritorious musician with an ungainly presence; an actor whose strenuousness in representing the hunger of the imprisoned captive in the dungeon trenched closely on burlesque".

Haizinger retired in 1858, and afterwards appeared only occasionally. In Karlsruhe, he expanded the singing school he had started during his stage career, and he edited educational books for singers. He died in Karlsruhe in 1869.
