= Euryanthe =

Opera by Carl Maria von Weber

- Opera by Carl Maria von Weber
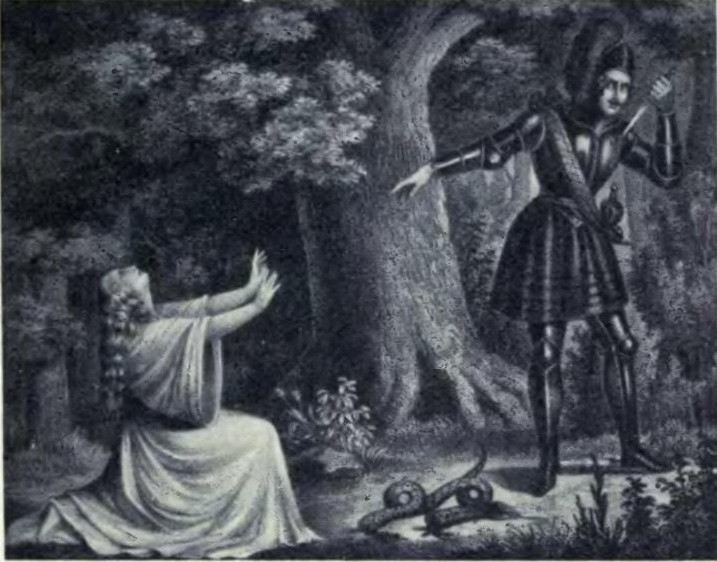
- The forest scene, at the Royal Theatre in Dresden with Wilhelmine Schröder-Devrient in the title role
- Librettist: Helmina von Chézy
- Language: German
- Based on: 13th-century French romance
- Premiere: 25 October 1823; Theater am Kärntnertor, Vienna

Euryanthe (J. 291, Op. 81) is a German grand heroic-romantic opera by Carl Maria von Weber, first performed at the Theater am Kärntnertor in Vienna on 25 October 1823. Though acknowledged as one of Weber's most important operas, the work is rarely staged because of the weak libretto by Helmina von Chézy (who, incidentally, was also the author of the failed play Rosamunde, for which Franz Schubert wrote music). Euryanthe is based on the 13th-century French romance L'Histoire du très-noble et chevalereux prince Gérard, comte de Nevers et la très-virtueuse et très chaste princesse Euriant de Savoye, sa mye.

Only the overture, an outstanding example of the early German Romantic style (heralding Richard Wagner), is regularly played today. Like Schubert's lesser-known Alfonso und Estrella, of the same time and place (Vienna, 1822), Euryanthe parts with the German Singspiel tradition, adopting a musical approach without the interruption of spoken dialogue characteristic of earlier German language operas such as Mozart's Die Zauberflöte, Beethoven's Fidelio, and Weber's own Der Freischütz.

The autograph manuscript of the opera is preserved in the Saxon State and University Library Dresden.

== Performance history ==
Euryanthe premiered on 25 October 1823, in a year marked by Vienna's interest in Italian operas, particularly those of Rossini. Although the initial reception was enthusiastic, the opera lasted only 20 performances, with complaints about the libretto and the length of the opera. Franz Schubert commented that, "This is not music"

In spite of this, the opera has since had several champions. Victor Hugo in Les Misérables calls the huntsman's chorus in act 3 "perhaps the most beautiful piece of music ever composed". During his term as director of the Vienna State Opera, Gustav Mahler mounted a new production of Euryanthe in 1903. Despite amendments in the libretto by Mahler himself (who described von Chézy as a "poetess with a full heart and an empty head") and a few changes in the score there were only five performances. Mahler realised the weaknesses of the libretto and the absurdities of the plot; in particular, in the third act, the ludicrously implausible meeting of all the characters in the middle of a rocky waste, a scene which he always alluded to as 'the merry folk reunited'. Leo Slezak played Adolar, Leopold Demuth played Lysiart.

The composer and musicologist Donald Francis Tovey regarded Euryanthe as musically superior to Wagner's better-known opera Lohengrin (whose plot and music echo Euryanthe in several respects, especially with regard to the use of Leitmotiv technique) and made a new performing version, while Arturo Toscanini conducted the La Scala premiere in 1902. Carlo Maria Giulini conducted a performance in May 1954 at the Maggio Musicale Fiorentino, and a recording is available, along with other historic live recordings. Euryanthe has also been staged more frequently in recent years.

Grove notes Weber's use of chromaticism to depict the evil characters, the fine orchestration, and the careful blend of recitative, arioso and set piece.

== Roles ==
Role	Voice type	Premiere cast, 25 October 1823
King Louis VI	bass	Joseph Seipelt
Euryanthe of Savoy	soprano	Henriette Sontag
Eglantine von Puiset	soprano	Therese Grünbaum
Adolar, Count of Nevers	tenor	Anton Haizinger
Lysiart, Count of Forest	baritone	Anton Forti
Rudolf, a knight	tenor	Jakob Wilhelm Rauscher
Bertha, a country girl	soprano	Henriette Theimer-Forti
Ladies, knights, soldiers, hunters, pages, heralds, peasants

== Synopsis ==
Time: 1110
Place: Prémery and Nevers, France

=== Act 1 ===
Euryanthe is betrothed to Count Adolar of Nevers. In a hall of the palace of King Louis VI of France in Prémery, the count sings the praises of his promised bride (who is not present). Lysiart, Count of Forest and Beaujolais, challenges the fidelity of the maiden and asserts that he can win her should he care to try. Adolar stakes his lands and fortune on the faithfulness of Euryanthe and demands that Lysiart shall show some proof of his victory should he win one.

In Nevers, Euryanthe has befriended Eglantine de Puiset, the daughter of a mutineer. Eglantine is enamoured of Adolar, and under the pretence of friendship for her benefactor, she secretly determines to effect Euryanthe's downfall and rupture her attachment to Adolar. After questioning by Eglantine, Euryanthe confides a secret given to her by Adolar to Eglantine. Adolar's sister Emma had lost her lover in battle, and had killed herself by drinking poison from a ring (the 'ghost' music from the overture is heard). Her soul can find no rest until the ring, lying in her tomb, should be moistened with the tears of an injured and innocent maiden. Euryanthe, who has been praying each night at Emma's tomb, had promised Adolar to keep this secret, and, too late, she repents having told it to Eglantine. After Euryanthe leaves, Eglantine sings how she will denounce Euryanthe to Adolar. Lysiart arrives in order to escort Euryanthe to the king's palace.

=== Act 2 ===
At night, Lysiart is in despair because he has failed to win Euryanthe for himself and thus has lost his wager with Adolar. He vows to get revenge (though at this point he does not know how). Eglantine happens by, after visiting Emma's tomb and abstracting the ring. As Lysiart and Eglantine discover each other, they realize they can make common cause against their enemies. Lysiart proposes marriage with Eglantine and promises to give her dominion over Nevers if the plot succeeds. Eglantine gives the ring to Lysiart.

Before an assembly in the hall at Prémery, Adolar reveals his anxiety while still longing for his bride, who then arrives (still unaware of the wager). Lysiart displays the ring to Count Adolar, claiming that Euryanthe had told him about it. Adolar is convinced that his betrothed is unfaithful, since she must have betrayed the secret known to him and her alone. Euryanthe admits she revealed his secret, but protests her innocence otherwise. Her admission is taken by all to prove her infidelity. Adolar gives up his possessions to Lysiart, and rushes off into the forest with Euryanthe.

=== Act 3 ===
In a rocky gorge, Adolar intends to kill Euryanthe, still protesting her innocence, and then himself. They are suddenly attacked by a serpent and the girl throws herself between her lover and the monster; Adolar kills the serpent. He cannot find the heart to kill the one who would have given her life for his, and he goes off, leaving her to her fate. Euryanthe longs for death, but the king and his hunters arrive on the scene, and she recounts the story of her woe and the treachery of Eglantine. Although joyful that she might see Adolar again, she collapses as they lead her away.

Meanwhile, Eglantine has become engaged to Lysiart, and the wedding is about to take place in the Castle of Nevers (no longer in Adolar's possession), when she is stricken with remorse. Adolar has entered in black armour with his visor down. Eglantine, struck by the silence of the courtiers, and still in love with Adolar, thinks that Euryanthe appears to her as a ghost. Adolar shows who he is, and challenges Lysiart to fight. The king appears, and to punish Adolar for his distrust of Euryanthe, leads him to think that she is dead. Eglantine, triumphant at the supposed death of her rival, makes known the plot and is slain by the furious Lysiart. As Eglantine dies Euryanthe enters and rushes to Adolar. Lysiart is led off. Adolar says that his sister will find peace at last because her ring was moistened by the tears of the innocent Euryanthe. The king blesses the lovers.

== Instrumentation ==
The opera is scored for two flutes, two oboes, two clarinets, two bassoons, four horns, two trumpets, three trombones, timpani, and strings.

== Recordings ==
- 2020 Naxos BD and DVD from Theater an der Wien, 2018 new production: Jacquelyn Wagner (Euryanthe), Theresa Kronthaler (Eglantine), Norman Reinhardt (Adolar), Andrew Foster-Williams (Lysiart), Stefan Cerny (King Louis VI), Vienna Radio Symphony Orchestra, Arnold Schoenberg Choir, Christof Loy (stage director), Constantin Trinks (conductor).
- 2002 DVD videorecording from the Teatro Lirico di Cagliari conducted by Gérard Korsten; cast: Elena Prokina, Jolana Fogasova, Yikun Chung, Andreas Scheibner – Dynamic (record label) – Cat. 33408
- 1974 EMI premiere studio recording of the complete score with Jessye Norman, Nicolai Gedda, Tom Krause and Rita Hunter; the Staatskapelle Dresden conducted by Marek Janowski
- 1949 radio recording from Austrian Radio conducted by Meinhard von Zallinger with Maria Reining, Walter Berry – Aura LRC 1121, 2002

== Bibliography ==
- Bandur, Markus / Betzwieser, Thomas / Ziegler, Frank (editors): Euryanthe-Interpretationen. Studien und Dokumente zur "Großen romantischen Oper" von Helmina von Chézy und Carl Maria von Weber (= Weber-Studien, volume 10) publisher: Schott Music, Mainz 2018, ISBN 3795703875, ISBN 9783795703875 (contribution by S. Henze-Döhring, F. Ziegler, S. Jahnke, T. G. Waidelich, J. Maehder, J. Veit, H.-J. Hinrichsen, A. Langer, J. Schläder)
- Brown, Clive, "Euryanthe", in Stanley Sadie, (Ed.), The New Grove Dictionary of Opera, Vol. 2., London: Macmillan Publishers, Inc. 1998 ISBN 0-333-73432-7 ISBN 1-56159-228-5
- La Grange, Henry-Louis de, Gustav Mahler, Vienna: The Years of Challenge, Vol. 2, 1897 to 1904. Oxford University Press, 1995 ISBN 0-19-315159-6
- Döhring, Sieghart / Henze-Döhring, Sabine, Die Oper des 19. Jahrhunderts, »Gattungen der Musikgeschichte«, vol. 13, Laaber (Laaber) 1997
- Heidlberger, Frank, Carl Maria von Weber und Hector Berlioz, Tutzing (Schneider) 1994.
- Lo, Kii Ming, Turandot auf der Opernbühne, Frankfurt/Bern/New York (Peter Lang) 1996.
- Krummacher, Friedhelm / Schwab, Heinrich W. (editors.), Weber ─ Jenseits des »Freischütz«, »Kieler Schriften zur Musikwissenschaft«, vol. 32, Kassel (Bärenreiter) 1989.
- Maehder, Jürgen, Die Poetisierung der Klangfarben in Dichtung und Musik der deutschen Romantik, in: AURORA. Jahrbuch der Eichendorff Gesellschaft 38/1978, S. 9 31.
- Schmid, Manfred Hermann Schmid, Musik als Abbild. Studien zum Werk von Weber, Schumann und Wagner, Tutzing (Schneider) 1981.
- Tusa, Michael C.: Euryanthe and Carl Maria von Webers Dramaturgy of German Opera (= Studies in Musical Genesis and Structure), Oxford (Clarendon) 1991
- Joachim Veit, Der junge Carl Maria von Weber. Untersuchungen zum Einfluß Franz Danzis und Abbé Georg Voglers, Mainz etc. (Schott) 1990.

== See also ==
- 527 Euryanthe
