= Hölzel =

Hölzel is a surname. Notable people with the surname include:

- Adolf Hölzel (1853–1934), German artist and painter
- Gustav Hölzel (1813–1883), Austro-Hungarian bass-baritone and composer
- Johann Hölzel (1957–1998), stage name Falco, Austrian singer, musician, and songwriter
