= Auffenberg =

Auffenberg, ennobled von Auffenberg, is a German-language surname. Notable people with the surname include:

- Franz Xaver von Auffenberg (1744–1815), Austrian general
- Joseph von Auffenberg (1798–1857), German dramatist
- Moritz von Auffenberg (1852–1928), Austro-Hungarian general and minister of war
- Walter Auffenberg (1928–2004), American biologist
