= Chézy =

Chézy may refer to:

People

- Antoine de Chézy (1718–1798), French hydraulic engineer
- Antoine-Léonard de Chézy (1773–1832), French orientalist
- Helmina von Chézy (1783–1856), German journalist, poet and playwright

Communes in France

- Chézy, Allier, in the Allier department
- Chézy-en-Orxois, in the Aisne department
- Chézy-sur-Marne, in the Aisne department

Other

- Chézy formula, for river flows
