= 527 Euryanthe =

Main-belt asteroid

Discovery
- Discovered by: Max Wolf
- Discovery site: Heidelberg
- Discovery date: 20 March 1904

Designations
- Pronunciation: /jʊəriˈænθiː/
- Alternative designations: 1904 NR

Orbital characteristics
- Epoch 31 July 2016 (JD 2457600.5)
- Uncertainty parameter 0
- Observation arc: 112.06 yr (40931 d)
- Aphelion: 3.1363 AU (469.18 Gm)
- Perihelion: 2.3191 AU (346.93 Gm)
- Semi-major axis: 2.7277 AU (408.06 Gm)
- Eccentricity: 0.14980
- Orbital period (sidereal): 4.51 yr (1645.5 d)
- Mean anomaly: 245.24°
- Mean motion: 0° 13^{m} 7.608^{s} / day
- Inclination: 9.6595°
- Longitude of ascending node: 120.551°
- Argument of perihelion: 203.540°

Physical characteristics
- Dimensions: 52±2 km
- Synodic rotation period: 26.06 h (1.086 d)
- Geometric albedo: 0.0576±0.004
- Absolute magnitude (H): 10.4

527 Euryanthe is a minor planet orbiting the Sun. It was discovered in 1904 by Max Wolf and named after the heroine of the opera Euryanthe by the German composer Carl Maria von Weber.
