= Antoine-Léonard de Chézy =

French orientalist

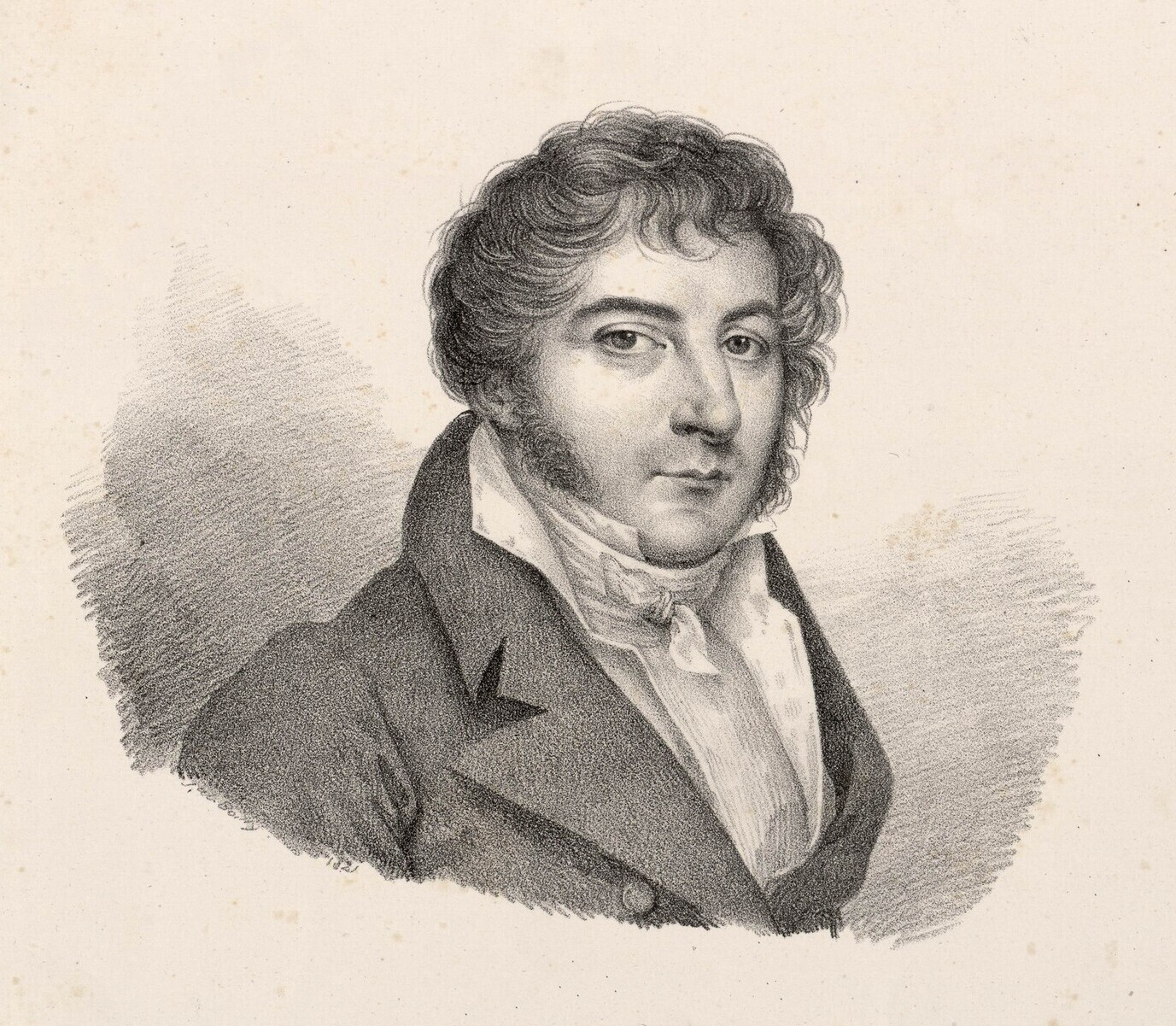
Antoine-Léonard Chézy, 1821

Antoine-Léonard de Chézy (15 January 1773 – 31 August 1832) was a French orientalist and one of the first European scholars of Sanskrit.

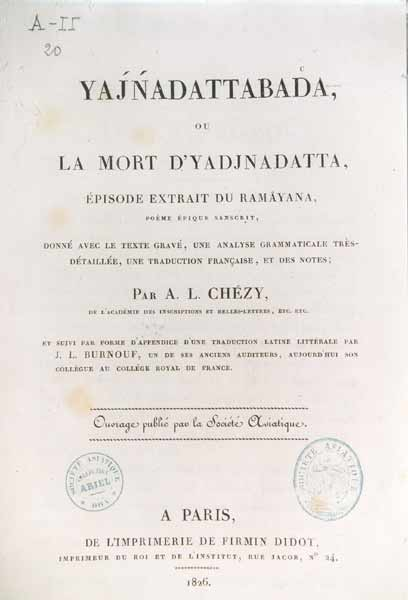
Title page of Yajnadattabada, translated by Antoine-Léonard Chézy.

== Biography ==
He was born at Neuilly. His father, Antoine de Chézy (1718–1798), was an engineer who finally became director of the École des Ponts et Chaussées. The son was intended for his father's profession; but in 1799 he obtained a post in the oriental manuscripts department of the national library. In about 1803, he began studying Sanskrit, and although he possessed no grammar or dictionary, he succeeded in acquiring sufficient knowledge of the language to be able to compose poetry in it.

In Paris sometime between 1800 and 1805, Friedrich Schlegel's wife Dorothea introduced him to the Wilhelmine Christiane von Klencke, called Hermina or Hermine, who, extremely unusually for the time, was a very young divorcée who had come to Paris to be a correspondent for German newspapers. In 1805 they married and Helmina subsequently gave birth to two sons: the author Wilhelm Theodor von Chézy (1806–1865) and Max von Chézy (1808–1846), who became a painter. However, the marriage was ultimately not a success, and the couple parted, although did not divorce, in 1810. De Chézy continued to make annual payments for her support until his death.

He was the first professor of Sanskrit appointed in the Collège de France (1815), where his pupils included Alexandre Langlois, Auguste-Louis-Armand Loiseleur-Deslongchamps and especially Eugène Burnouf, who would become his successor at the Collège on his death in 1832.

He was a chevalier of the Légion d'honneur, and a member of the Académie des Inscriptions. Among his works were:

- Medjnoun et Leïla (1807), from the Persian.
- Yadjnadatta-badha ou la mort d'Yadjnadatta (1814).
- La Reconnaissance de Sacountala (1830), from the Sanskrit.
- Anthologie érotique d'Amarou (1831), published under the pseudonym A. L. Apudy.

== See also ==
- Chézy (disambiguation)
- Louis-Mathieu Langlès
