= Symphony No. 9 (Beethoven) =

1824 symphony by Ludwig van Beethoven

- Choral symphony by Ludwig van Beethoven
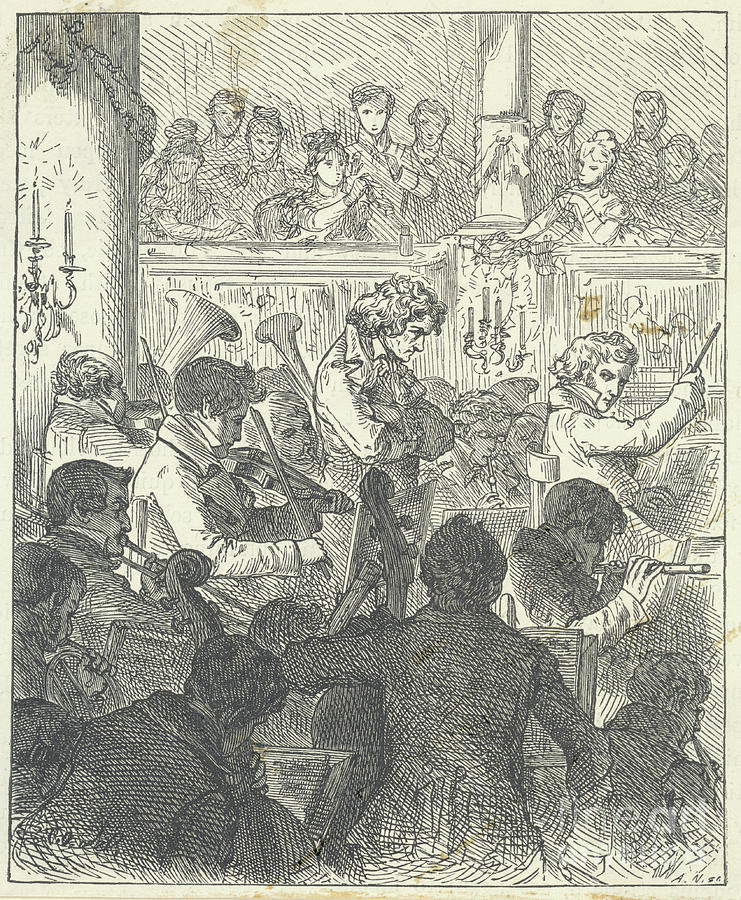
- 19th-century lithograph by Carl Offterdinger, depicting the premiere of the 9th Symphony. Beethoven stands in the center.
- Other name: The Ninth
- Key: D minor
- Opus: 125
- Period: Classical-Romantic (transitional)
- Text: Friedrich Schiller's "Ode to Joy"
- Language: German
- Composed: 1822–1824
- Dedication: King Frederick William III of Prussia
- Duration: 65–70 minutes
- Movements: 4
- Scoring: Orchestra with SATB chorus and soloists

Premiere
- Date: 7 May 1824
- Location: Theater am Kärntnertor, Vienna
- Conductor: Michael Umlauf and Ludwig van Beethoven
- Performers: Kärntnertor house orchestra, Gesellschaft der Musikfreunde with soloists: Henriette Sontag (soprano), Caroline Unger (alto), Anton Haizinger (tenor), and Joseph Seipelt (bass)

The Symphony No. 9 in D minor, Op. 125, is a choral symphony, the final complete symphony by Ludwig van Beethoven, composed between 1822 and 1824. It was first performed in Vienna on 7 May 1824. The symphony is regarded by many critics and musicologists as a masterpiece of Western classical music and one of the supreme achievements in the history of music. One of the best-known works in common practice music, it stands as one of the most frequently performed symphonies in the world.

The Ninth was the first example of a major composer scoring vocal parts in a symphony. The final (4th) movement of the symphony, commonly known as the Ode to Joy, features four vocal soloists and a chorus in the parallel key of D major. The text was adapted from the "An die Freude (Ode to Joy)", a poem written by Friedrich Schiller in 1785 and revised in 1803, with additional text written by Beethoven. In the 20th century, an instrumental arrangement of the chorus was adopted by the Council of Europe, and later the European Union, as the Anthem of Europe.

In 2001, Beethoven's original, hand-written manuscript of the score, held by the Berlin State Library, was added by UNESCO to its Memory of the World International Register, becoming the first musical score so designated.

== History ==
=== Composition ===
The Philharmonic Society of London originally commissioned the symphony in 1817. Beethoven made preliminary sketches for the work later that year with the key set as D minor and vocal participation also forecast. The main composition work was done between autumn, 1822 and the completion of the autograph in February, 1824. The symphony emerged from other pieces by Beethoven that, while completed works in their own right, are also in some sense forerunners of the future symphony. The Choral Fantasy, Op. 80, composed in 1808, basically an extended piano concerto movement, brings in a choir and vocal soloists for the climax. The vocal forces sing a theme first played instrumentally, and this theme is reminiscent of the corresponding theme in the Ninth Symphony.

Going further back, an earlier version of the Choral Fantasy theme is found in the song "Gegenliebe" ("Returned Love") for piano and high voice, which dates from before 1795. According to Robert W. Gutman, Mozart's Offertory in D minor, "Misericordias Domini", K. 222, written in 1775, contains a melody that foreshadows "Ode to Joy".

=== Premiere ===
Although most of Beethoven's major works had been premiered in Vienna, the composer planned to have his latest compositions performed in Berlin as soon as possible, as he believed he had fallen out of favor with the Viennese and the current musical taste was now dominated by Italian operatic composers such as Rossini. When his friends and financiers learned of this, they pleaded with Beethoven to hold the concert in Vienna, in the form of a petition signed by a number of prominent Viennese music patrons and performers.

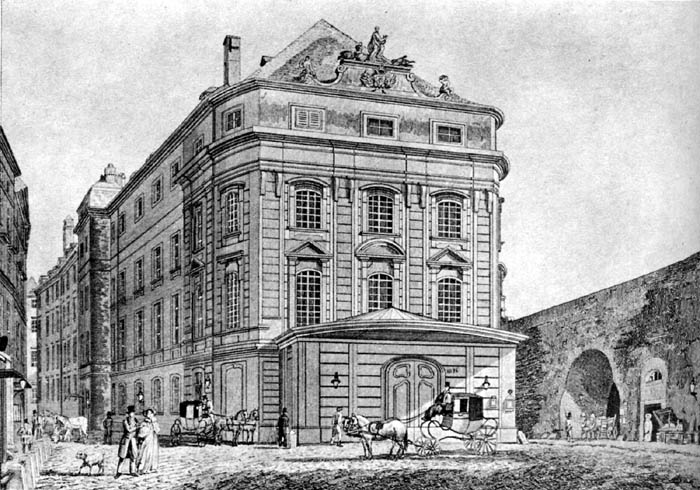
Theater am Kärntnertor in 1830

Beethoven, flattered by the adoration of the Viennese, premiered the Ninth Symphony on 7 May 1824 in the Theater am Kärntnertor in Vienna along with the overture The Consecration of the House (Die Weihe des Hauses) and three parts (Kyrie, Credo and Agnus Dei) of the Missa solemnis. This was Beethoven's first onstage appearance since 1814 and the hall was packed with an eager and curious audience with a number of noted musicians and figures in Vienna including Franz Schubert, Carl Czerny, and the Austrian chancellor Klemens von Metternich.

The premiere of the Ninth Symphony involved an orchestra nearly twice as large as usual and required the combined efforts of the Kärntnertor house orchestra, the Vienna Music Society (Gesellschaft der Musikfreunde), and a select group of capable amateurs. While no complete list of premiere performers exists, many of Vienna's most elite performers are known to have participated.

The soprano and alto parts were sung by two famous young singers of the day, both recruited personally by Beethoven: Henriette Sontag and Caroline Unger. German soprano Henriette Sontag was 18 years old when Beethoven asked her to perform in the premiere of the Ninth. 20-year-old contralto Caroline Unger, a native of Vienna, had gained critical praise in 1821 appearing in Rossini's Tancredi. After performing in Beethoven's 1824 premiere, Unger then found fame in Italy and Paris. Italian opera composers Bellini and Donizetti were known to have written roles specifically for her voice. Anton Haizinger and Joseph Seipelt sang the tenor and bass/baritone parts, respectively.

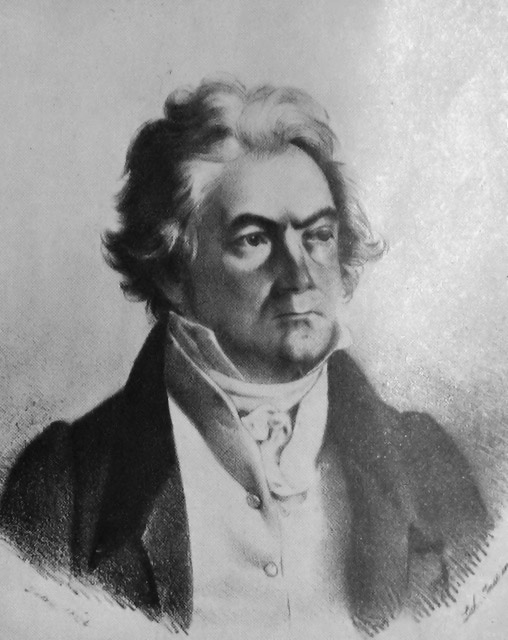
Portrait of Beethoven in 1824, the year his Ninth Symphony was premiered. He was almost completely deaf by the time of its composition.

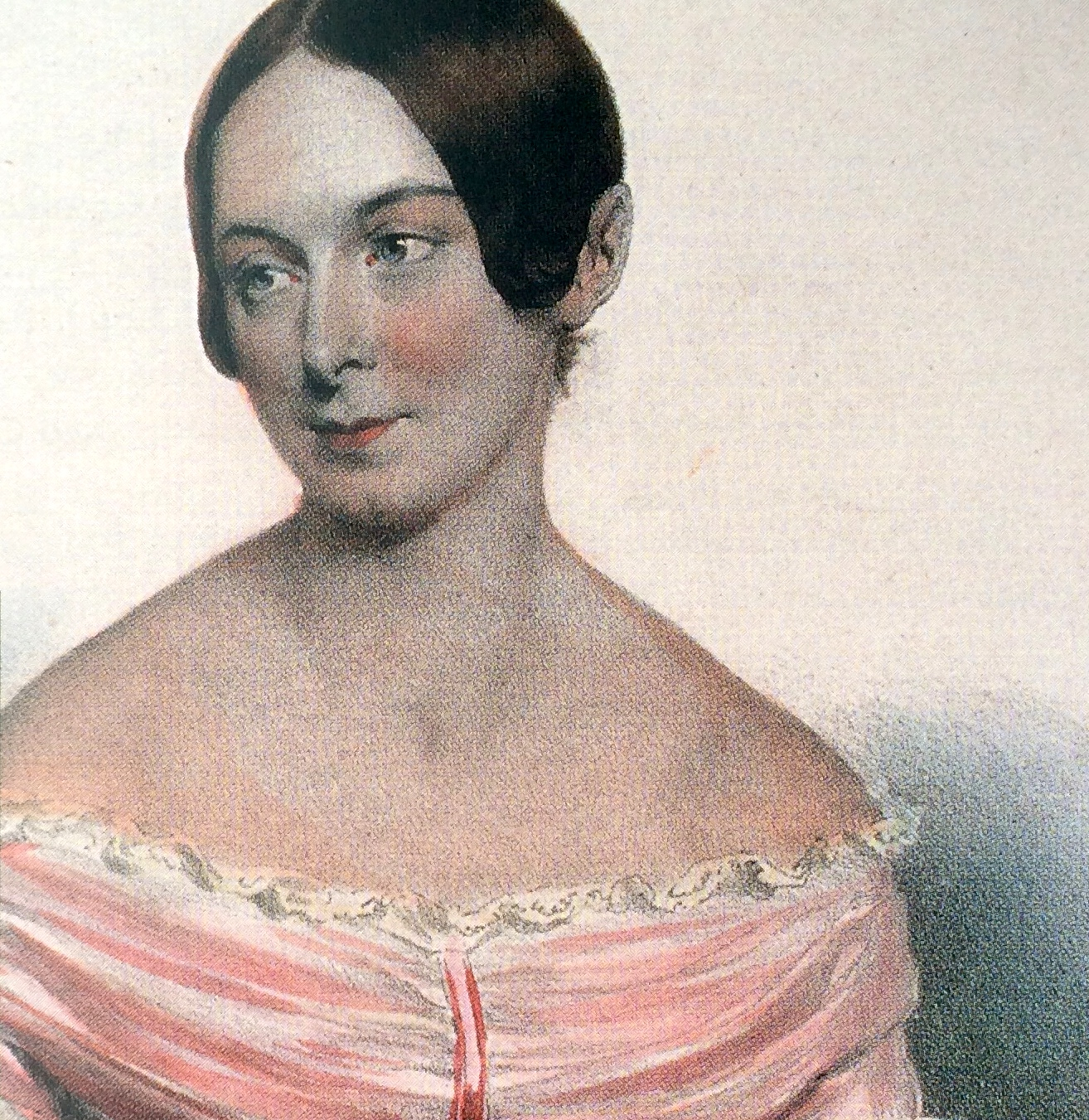
Caroline Unger, who sang the contralto part at the first performance and is credited with turning Beethoven to face the applauding audience

Although the performance was officially conducted by Michael Umlauf, the theatre's Kapellmeister, Beethoven shared the stage with him. However, two years earlier, Umlauf had watched the composer's attempt to conduct a dress rehearsal for a revision of his opera Fidelio end in disaster. For the Ninth's premiere, he instructed the singers and musicians to ignore the almost completely deaf Beethoven. At the beginning of every part, Beethoven, who sat by the stage, gave the tempos. He was turning the pages of his score and beating time for an orchestra he could not hear.

There are a number of anecdotes concerning the premiere of the Ninth. Based on the testimony of some of the participants, there are suggestions that the symphony was under-rehearsed (there were only two complete rehearsals) and somewhat uneven in execution. On the other hand, the premiere was a great success. In any case, Beethoven was not to blame, as violinist Joseph Böhm recalled:

Beethoven himself conducted, that is, he stood in front of a conductor's stand and threw himself back and forth like a madman. At one moment he stretched to his full height, at the next he crouched down to the floor, he flailed about with his hands and feet as though he wanted to play all the instruments and sing all the chorus parts. – The actual direction was in [Louis] Duport's (Note: Presumably, Böhm meant the conductor Michael Umlauf.) hands; we musicians followed his baton only.

Reportedly, the scherzo was completely interrupted at one point by applause. Either at the end of the scherzo or the end of the symphony (testimonies differ), Beethoven was several bars off and still conducting; the contralto Caroline Unger walked over and gently turned Beethoven around to accept the audience's cheers and applause. According to the critic for the Theater-Zeitung, "the public received the musical hero with the utmost respect and sympathy, listened to his wonderful, gigantic creations with the most absorbed attention and broke out in jubilant applause, often during sections, and repeatedly at the end of them." The audience acclaimed him through standing ovations five times; there were handkerchiefs in the air, hats, and raised hands, so that Beethoven, who they knew could not hear the applause, could at least see the ovations.

Beethoven's Symphony No. 9 was performed in the United States for the first time on May 20, 1846, by the New York Philharmonic in Castle Clinton, New York City.

=== Editions ===
The first German edition was printed by B. Schott's Söhne (Mainz) in 1826. The Breitkopf & Härtel edition dating from 1864 has been used widely by orchestras. In 1997, Bärenreiter published an edition by Jonathan Del Mar. According to Del Mar, this edition corrects nearly 3,000 mistakes in the Breitkopf edition, some of which were "remarkable". David Levy, however, criticized this edition, saying that it could create "quite possibly false" traditions. Breitkopf also published a new edition by Peter Hauschild in 2005.

=== Assessments and philhellenism ===
Beethoven was a philhellene who sympathized with the Greek War of Independence and had already composed The Ruins of Athens as a philhellenic work. As a result, some scholars have argued that the Ninth Symphony reflects sympathy for the Greeks and also serves as a protest against Metternich's censorship. The Ninth Symphony's finale, in particular the hearing of the Turkish march, has been interpreted as a symbol of Ottoman oppression and the fugato as battle music depicting the fight against despotism and restoring Elysium to Greece.

Beethoven also had contacts with Greeks in Vienna which might have influenced his Ninth Symphony. When he was producing and finishing the symphony, he was living in a Greek-owned house, alongside the two Greek owners as his housemates.

== Instrumentation ==
The symphony is scored for the following orchestra. These are by far the largest forces needed for any Beethoven symphony; at the premiere, Beethoven augmented them further by assigning two players to each wind part.

Woodwinds

Piccolo (fourth movement only)
2 Flutes
2 Oboes
2 Clarinets in A, B♭ and C
2 Bassoons
Contrabassoon (fourth movement only)

Brass

4 Horns in D, B♭ and E♭
2 Trumpets in D and B♭
3 Trombones (alto, tenor, and bass; second and fourth movements only)

Percussion

Timpani
Bass drum (fourth movement only)
Triangle (fourth movement only)
Cymbals (fourth movement only)

Voices (fourth movement only)

Soprano solo
Alto solo
Tenor solo
Baritone (or bass) solo (Note: The score specifies baritone, performance practice often uses a bass.)
SATB choir (tenor briefly divides)

Strings

Violins I, II
Violas
Cellos
Double basses

== Form ==
The symphony is in four movements. The structure of each movement is as follows:

I. Allegro ma non troppo, un poco maestoso

II. Molto vivace

III. Adagio molto e cantabile

IV. Finale
Pro Musica Symphony Orchestra, conducted by Jascha Horenstein

No.	Tempo marking	Meter	Key
I	Allegro ma non troppo, un poco maestoso = 88	2/4	d
II	Molto vivace . = 116	3/4	d
II	Presto = 116	2/2	D
II	Molto vivace	3/4	d
II	Presto	2/2	D
III	Adagio molto e cantabile = 60	4/4	B♭
III	Andante moderato = 63	3/4	D
III	Tempo I	4/4	B♭
III	Andante moderato	3/4	G
III	Adagio	4/4	E♭-e♭-B
III	Lo stesso tempo	12/8	B♭
IV	Presto . = 96	3/4	d
IV	Allegro assai = 80	4/4	D
IV	Presto ("O Freunde")	3/4	d
IV	Allegro assai ("Freude, schöner Götterfunken")	4/4	D
IV	Alla marcia; Allegro assai vivace . = 84 ("Froh, wie seine Sonnen")	6/8	B♭
IV	Andante maestoso = 72 ("Seid umschlungen, Millionen!")	3/2	G
IV	Adagio ma non troppo, ma divoto = 60 ("Ihr stürzt nieder, Millionen?")	3/2	g
IV	Allegro energico, sempre ben marcato . = 84 ("Freude, schöner Götterfunken" – "Seid umschlungen, Millionen!")	6/4	D
IV	Allegro ma non tanto = 120 ("Freude, Tochter aus Elysium!")	2/2	D
IV	Prestissimo = 132 ("Seid umschlungen, Millionen!")	2/2	D

Beethoven changes the usual pattern of Classical symphonies in placing the scherzo movement before the slow movement (in symphonies, slow movements are usually placed before scherzi). This was the first time he did this in a symphony, although he had done so in some previous works, including the String Quartet Op. 18 no. 5, the "Archduke" piano trio Op. 97, the Hammerklavier piano sonata Op. 106. Haydn too had used this arrangement in a number of his own works such as the String Quartet No. 30 in E♭ major, as did Mozart in three of the Haydn Quartets and the G minor String Quintet.

=== I. Allegro ma non troppo, un poco maestoso ===
The first movement is in sonata form without an exposition repeat. It begins with open fifths (A and E) played pianissimo by tremolo strings. The opening, with its perfect fifth quietly emerging, resembles the sound of an orchestra tuning up, steadily building up until the first main theme in D minor at bar 17.

Before the development enters, the tremolous introduction returns. The development can be divided into four subdivisions, with adheres strictly to the order of themes. The first and second subdivisions are the development of bars 1–2 of the first theme (bars 17–18 of the first movement) . The third subdivision develops bars 3–4 of the first theme (bars 19–20 of the first movement). The fourth subdivision that follows develops bars 1–4 of the second theme (bars 80–83 of the first movement) for three times: first in A minor, then to F major twice.

At the outset of the recapitulation (which repeats the main melodic themes) in bar 301, the theme returns, this time played fortissimo and in D major, rather than D minor. The movement ends with a massive coda that takes up nearly a quarter of the movement, as in Beethoven's Third and Fifth Symphonies.

A performance of the first movement typically lasts about 15 minutes.

=== II. Molto vivace ===
The second movement is a scherzo and trio. Like the first movement, the scherzo is in D minor, with the introduction bearing a passing resemblance to the opening theme of the first movement, a pattern also found in the Hammerklavier piano sonata, written a few years earlier. At times during the piece, Beethoven specifies one downbeat every three bars—perhaps because of the fast tempo—with the direction ritmo di tre battute (rhythm of three beats) and one beat every four bars with the direction ritmo di quattro battute (rhythm of four beats). Normally, a scherzo is in triple time. Beethoven wrote this piece in triple time but punctuated it in a way that, when coupled with the tempo, makes it sound as if it is in quadruple time.

While adhering to the standard compound ternary design (three-part structure) of a dance movement (scherzo-trio-scherzo or minuet-trio-minuet), the scherzo section has an elaborate internal structure; it is a complete sonata form. Within this sonata form, the first group of the exposition (the statement of the main melodic themes) starts out with a fugue in D minor on the subject below.

For the second subject, it modulates to the unusual key of C major. The exposition then repeats before a short development section, where Beethoven explores other ideas. The recapitulation (repeating of the melodic themes heard in the opening of the movement) further develops the exposition's themes, also containing timpani solos. A new development section leads to the repeat of the recapitulation, and the scherzo concludes with a brief codetta.

The contrasting trio section is in D major and in duple time. The trio is the first time the trombones play. Following the trio, the second occurrence of the scherzo, unlike the first, plays through without any repetition, after which there is a brief reprise of the trio, and the movement ends with an abrupt coda.

The duration of the complete second movement is about 14 minutes when two frequently omitted repeats are played.

=== III. Adagio molto e cantabile ===
The third movement is a lyrical, slow movement in B♭ major—the subdominant of D minor's relative major key, F major. It is in a double variation form, with each pair of variations progressively elaborating the rhythm and melodic ideas. The first variation, like the theme, is in 4/4 time, the second in 12/8. The variations are separated by passages in 3/4, the first in D major, the second in G major, the third in E♭ major, and the fourth in B major. The final variation is twice interrupted by episodes in which loud fanfares from the full orchestra are answered by octaves by the first violins. A prominent French horn solo is assigned to the fourth player.

A typical performance of the third movement lasts around 15 minutes.

=== IV. Finale ===
The choral finale is Beethoven's musical representation of universal brotherhood based on the "Ode to Joy" theme and is in theme and variations form.

The movement starts with an introduction in which musical material from each of the preceding three movements—though none are literal quotations of previous music—are successively presented and then dismissed by instrumental recitatives played by the low strings. Following this, the "Ode to Joy" theme is finally introduced by the cellos and double basses. After three instrumental variations on this theme, the human voice is presented for the first time in the symphony by the baritone soloist, who sings words written by Beethoven himself: ''O Freunde, nicht diese Töne!' Sondern laßt uns angenehmere anstimmen, und freudenvollere.'' ("Oh friends, not these sounds! Let us instead strike up more pleasing and more joyful ones!").

At about 25 minutes in length, the finale is the longest of the four movements. Indeed, it is longer than several entire symphonies composed during the Classical era. Its form has been disputed by musicologists, as Nicholas Cook explains:

Beethoven had difficulty describing the finale himself; in letters to publishers, he said that it was like his Choral Fantasy, Op. 80, only on a much grander scale. We might call it a cantata constructed round a series of variations on the "Joy" theme. But this is rather a loose formulation, at least by comparison with the way in which many twentieth-century critics have tried to codify the movement's form. Thus there have been interminable arguments as to whether it should be seen as a kind of sonata form (with the "Turkish" music of bar 331, which is in B♭ major, functioning as a kind of second group), or a kind of concerto form (with bars 1–207 and 208–330 together making up a double exposition), or even a conflation of four symphonic movements into one (with bars 331–594 representing a Scherzo, and bars 595–654 a slow movement). The reason these arguments are interminable is that each interpretation contributes something to the understanding of the movement, but does not represent the whole story.

Cook gives the following table describing the form of the movement:

Bar		Key	Stanza	Description
1	1 (Note: The second column of bar numbers refers to the editions in which the finale is subdivided. Verses and choruses are numbered in accordance with the complete text of Schiller's "An die Freude")	d		Introduction with instrumental recitative and review of movements 1–3
92	92	D		"Joy" theme
116	116			"Joy" variation 1
140	140			"Joy" variation 2
164	164			"Joy" variation 3, with extension
208	1	d		Introduction with vocal recitative
241	4	D	V.1	"Joy" variation 4
269	33		V.2	"Joy" variation 5
297	61		V.3	"Joy" variation 6, with extension providing transition to
331	1	B♭		Introduction to
343	13			"Joy" variation 7 ("Turkish march")
375	45		C.4	"Joy" variation 8, with extension
431	101			Fugato episode based on "Joy" theme
543	213	D	V.1	"Joy" variation 9
595	1	G	C.1	Episode: "Seid umschlungen"
627	76	g	C.3	Episode: "Ihr stürzt nieder"
655	1	D	V.1, C.3	Double fugue (based on "Joy" and "Seid umschlungen" themes)
730	76		C.3	Episode: "Ihr stürzt nieder"
745	91		C.1	
763	1	D	V.1	Coda figure 1 (based on "Joy" theme)
832	70			Cadenza
851	1	D	C.1	Coda figure 2
904	54		V.1	
920	70			Coda figure 3 (based on "Joy" theme)

In line with Cook's remarks, Charles Rosen characterizes the final movement as a symphony within a symphony, played without interruption. This "inner symphony" follows the same overall pattern as the Ninth Symphony as a whole, with four "movements":

1. Theme and variations with slow introduction. The main theme, first in the cellos and basses, is later recapitulated by voices.
2. Scherzo in a 6/8 military style. It begins at Alla marcia (bars 331–594) and concludes with a 6/8 variation of the main theme with chorus.
3. Slow section with a new theme on the text "Seid umschlungen, Millionen!" It begins at Andante maestoso (bars 595–654).
4. Fugato finale on the themes of the first and third "movements". It begins at Allegro energico (bars 655–762), and two canons on main theme and "Seid unschlungen, Millionen!" respectively. It begins at Allegro ma non tanto (bars 763–940).

Rosen notes that the movement can also be analysed as a set of variations and simultaneously as a concerto sonata form with double exposition (with the fugato acting both as a development section and the second tutti of the concerto).

==== Text of the fourth movement ====
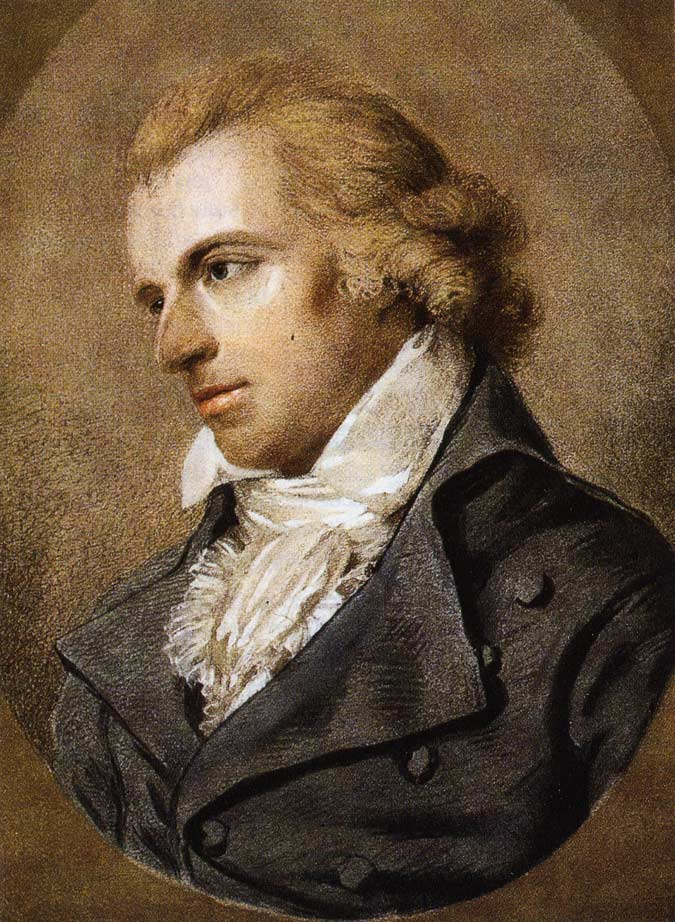
Portrait of Friedrich Schiller by Ludovike Simanowiz (1794)

The text is largely taken from Friedrich Schiller's "Ode to Joy", with a few additional introductory words written specifically by Beethoven (shown in italics). (Note: The translation for the introductory words is taken from the BBC Proms 2013 programme, for a concert held at the Royal Albert Hall (Prom 38, 11 August 2013). This concert was broadcast live on BBC Radio 3 and later on BBC4 television on 6 September 2013, where the same translation was used as subtitles. The translation for the main poem is taken from the Schiller Institute, (), because it preserves the iambic, that is, the alternating pattern of a stronger and a quieter syllable) The text, without repeats, is shown below, with a translation into English. The score includes many repeats.

O Freunde, nicht diese Töne!
Sondern laßt uns angenehmere anstimmen,
und freudenvollere.

Oh friends, not these sounds!
Let us instead strike up more pleasing
and more joyful ones!

Freude!
Freude!

Joy!
Joy!

Freude, schöner Götterfunken
Tochter aus Elysium,
Wir betreten feuertrunken,
Himmlische, dein Heiligtum!
Deine Zauber binden wieder
Was die Mode streng geteilt;
Alle Menschen werden Brüder,
Wo dein sanfter Flügel weilt.

Joy, thou beauteous godly lightning,
Daughter of Elysium,
Fire-drunken we are ent’ring
Heavenly, thy holy home!
Thy enchantments bind together,
What did custom stern divide,
Every man becomes a brother,
Where thy gentle wings abide.

Wem der große Wurf gelungen,
Eines Freundes Freund zu sein;
Wer ein holdes Weib errungen,
Mische seinen Jubel ein!
Ja, wer auch nur eine Seele
Sein nennt auf dem Erdenrund!
Und wer's nie gekonnt, der stehle
Weinend sich aus diesem Bund!

Who the noble prize achieveth,
Good friend of a friend to be;
Who a lovely wife attaineth,
Join us in his jubilee!
Yes—he too who but one being
On this earth can call his own!
He who ne’er was able, weeping
Stealeth from this league alone!

Freude trinken alle Wesen
An den Brüsten der Natur;
Alle Guten, alle Bösen
Folgen ihrer Rosenspur.
Küsse gab sie uns und Reben,
Einen Freund, geprüft im Tod;
Wollust ward dem Wurm gegeben,
Und der Cherub steht vor Gott.

Joy is drunk by every being
From kind nature’s flowing breasts,
Every evil, every good thing
For her rosy footprint quests.
Gave she us both vines and kisses,
In the face of death a friend,
To the worm were given blisses
And the Cherubs God attend.

Froh, wie seine Sonnen fliegen
Durch des Himmels prächt'gen Plan,
Laufet, Brüder, eure Bahn,
Freudig, wie ein Held zum Siegen.

As the suns are flying, happy
Through the heaven's glorious plane,
Travel, brothers, down your lane,
Joyful as in hero's vict'ry.

Seid umschlungen, Millionen!
Diesen Kuß der ganzen Welt!
Brüder, über'm Sternenzelt
Muß ein lieber Vater wohnen.

Ihr stürzt nieder, Millionen?
Ahnest du den Schöpfer, Welt?
Such' ihn über'm Sternenzelt!
Über Sternen muß er wohnen.

Be embrac'd, ye millions yonder!
Take this kiss throughout the world!
Brothers – o'er the stars unfurl'd
Must reside a loving Father.

Fall before him, all ye millions?
Know’st thou the Creator, world?
Seek above the stars unfurl’d,
Yonder dwells He in the heavens.

In the last two sections of the text, Beethoven goes back to the medieval sacred music tradition: the composer recalls a liturgical hymn, more specifically a psalmody, using the eighth mode of Gregorian chant, the Hypomixolydian. The religious questions, simultaneously with the affirmations and exhortations, are musically characterized by archaistic moments, veritable "Gregorian fossils" inserted into a "quasi-liturgical" structure based on the sequence first versicle (male chorus) – response (full chorus) – second versicle (male chorus) – response (full chorus) – main hymn. Beethoven's employment of this sacred music style has the effect of attenuating the interrogative nature of the text when is mentioned the prostration before the supreme being.

Towards the end of the movement, the choir sings the last four lines of the main theme, concluding with "Alle Menschen" before the soloists sing for one last time the song of joy at a slower tempo. The chorus repeats parts of "Seid umschlungen, Millionen!", then quietly sings, "Tochter aus Elysium", and finally, "Freude, schöner Götterfunken, Götterfunken!".

== Reception ==
The symphony was dedicated to the King of Prussia, Frederick William III.

Music critics almost universally consider the Ninth Symphony one of Beethoven's greatest works, and among the greatest musical works ever written. The finale, however, has had its detractors: "Early critics rejected [the finale] as cryptic and eccentric, the product of a deaf and ageing composer." Verdi admired the first three movements but criticised the bad writing for the voices in the last movement:

The alpha and omega is Beethoven's Ninth Symphony, marvellous in the first three movements, very badly set in the last. No one will ever approach the sublimity of the first movement, but it will be an easy task to write as badly for voices as in the last movement. And supported by the authority of Beethoven, they will all shout: "That's the way to do it..."

— Giuseppe Verdi, 1878

The musicologist Michael C. Tusa underlined that, in a work that recalls and blends together diverse musical styles of the past such as Gregorian chants; Palestrina and Baroque counterpoint and gigues; Haydn, and Mozart; and even his own compositions, Beethoven was able to make up an:

encyclopedic compendium of media, topics, meters, textures, styles, and genres... which thereby validates and unites disparate musical domains that are, in Schiller's words, strictly separated by fashion: instrumental and vocal, vernacular and cultivated, European and exotic, secular and sacred, pagan and Christian, improvisation and res facta, and so forth"

— Michael C. Tusa, 1999

== Performance challenges ==
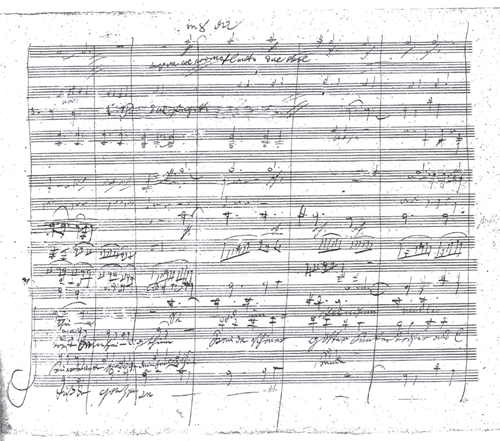
Handwritten page of the fourth movement

=== Metronome markings ===
Conductors in the historically informed performance movement, notably Roger Norrington, have used Beethoven's suggested tempos, to mixed reviews. Benjamin Zander has made a case for following Beethoven's metronome markings, both in writing and in performances with the Boston Philharmonic Orchestra and Philharmonia Orchestra of London. Beethoven's metronome still exists and was tested and found accurate, but the original heavy weight (whose position is vital to its accuracy) is missing and many musicians have considered his metronome marks to be unacceptably high.

=== Re-orchestrations and alterations ===
A number of conductors have made alterations in the instrumentation of the symphony. Notably, Richard Wagner doubled many woodwind passages, a modification greatly extended by Gustav Mahler, who revised the orchestration of the Ninth to make it sound like what he believed Beethoven would have wanted if given a modern orchestra. Wagner's Dresden performance of 1864 was the first to place the chorus and the solo singers behind the orchestra as has since become standard; previous conductors placed them between the orchestra and the audience.

==== 2nd bassoon doubling basses in the finale ====
Beethoven's indication that the 2nd bassoon should double the basses in bars 115–164 of the finale was not included in the Breitkopf & Härtel parts, though it was included in the full score.

== Notable performances and recordings ==
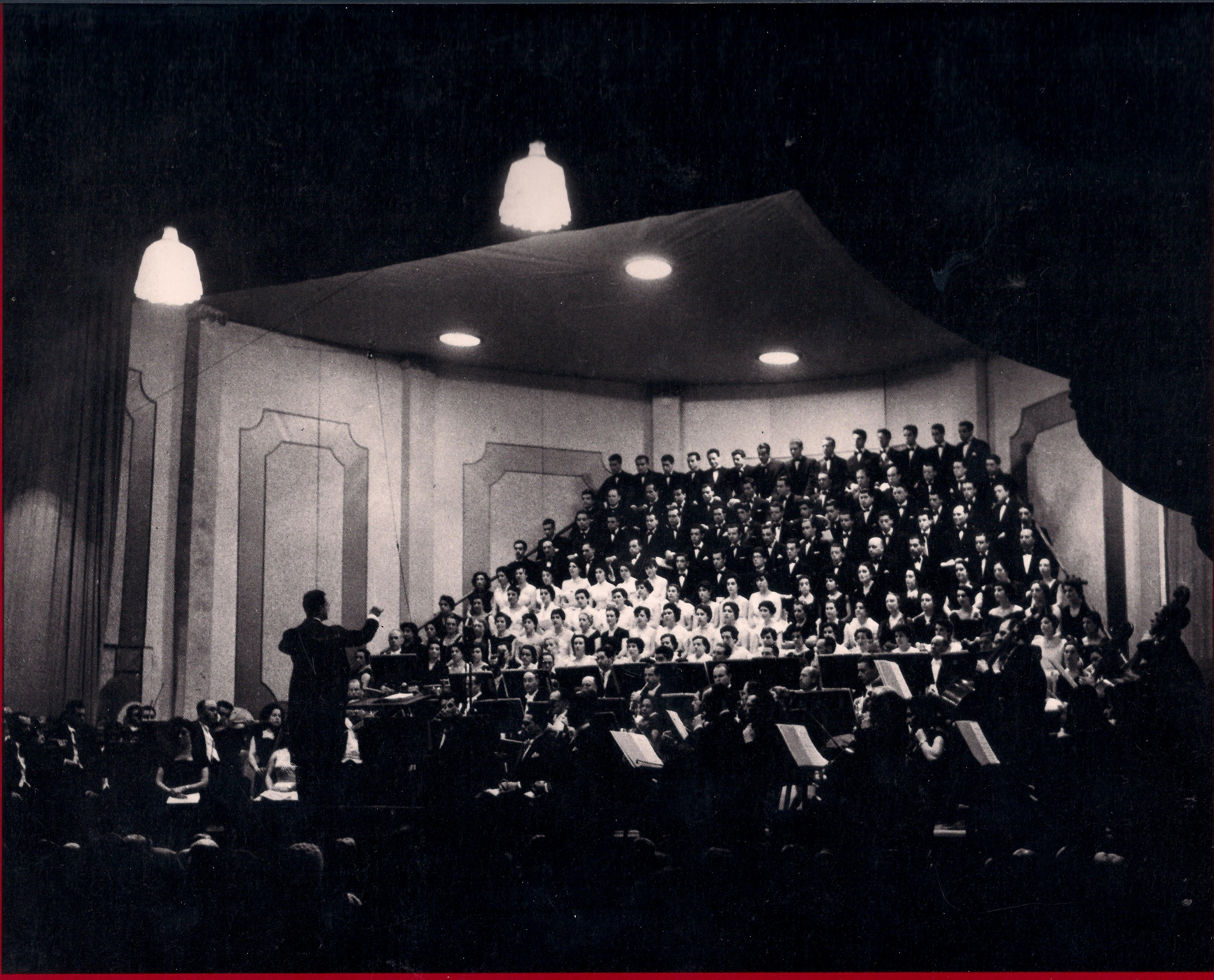
Ino Savini conducting the Ninth Symphony at the Rivoli Theatre in Porto, Portugal (1955)

The British première of the symphony was presented on 21 March 1825 by its commissioners, the Philharmonic Society of London, at its Argyll Rooms conducted by Sir George Smart and with the choral part sung in Italian. The American première was presented on 20 May 1846 by the newly formed New York Philharmonic at Castle Garden (in an attempt to raise funds for a new concert hall), conducted by the English-born George Loder, with the choral part translated into English for the first time. Leopold Stokowski's 1934 Philadelphia Orchestra and 1941 NBC Symphony Orchestra recordings also used English lyrics in the fourth movement.

Richard Wagner inaugurated his Bayreuth Festspielhaus by conducting the Ninth; since then it a number of times during the Bayreuth Festival with a conductor and cast members performing at that year's festival. Following the festival's temporary suspension after World War II, Wilhelm Furtwängler and the Bayreuth Festival Orchestra reinaugurated it with a performance of the Ninth.

Leonard Bernstein conducted a version of the Ninth Symphony at the Konzerthaus Berlin with Freiheit (Freedom) replacing Freude (Joy), to celebrate the fall of the Berlin Wall during Christmas of 1989. This concert was performed by an orchestra and chorus made up of many nationalities: from East and West Germany, the Bavarian Radio Symphony Orchestra and Chorus, the Chorus of the Berlin Radio Symphony Orchestra, and members of the Sächsische Staatskapelle Dresden, the Philharmonischer Kinderchor Dresden (Philharmonic Children's Choir Dresden); from the Soviet Union, members of the orchestra of the Kirov Theatre; from the United Kingdom, members of the London Symphony Orchestra; from the US, members of the New York Philharmonic; and from France, members of the Orchestre de Paris. Soloists were June Anderson, soprano; Sarah Walker, mezzo-soprano; Klaus König, tenor; and Jan-Hendrik Rootering, bass. Bernstein conducted the Ninth Symphony one last time with soloists Lucia Popp, soprano; Ute Trekel-Burckhardt, contralto; Wiesław Ochman, tenor; and Sergej Kopčák, bass, at the Prague Spring Festival with the Czech Philharmonic and Prague Philharmonic Choir in June 1990; he died four months later.

In 1998, Japanese conductor Seiji Ozawa conducted the fourth movement for the 1998 Winter Olympics opening ceremony, with six different choirs simultaneously singing from Japan, Germany, South Africa, China, the United States, and Australia.

In 1923, the first complete recording of Beethoven's Ninth Symphony was made by the acoustic recording process conducted by Bruno Seidler-Winkler. The recording was issued by Deutsche Grammophon in Germany and in the United States on the Vocalion label. The first electrical recording of the Ninth was recorded in England in 1926 by the London Symphony Orchestra conducted by Felix Weingartner, issued by Columbia Records. In 1934, the first complete American recording was made by RCA Victor with Leopold Stokowski conducting the Philadelphia Orchestra. Since the late 20th century, the Ninth has been recorded regularly by period performers, including Roger Norrington, Christopher Hogwood, and Sir John Eliot Gardiner.

The BBC Proms Youth Choir performed the piece alongside Georg Solti's UNESCO World Orchestra for Peace at the Royal Albert Hall during the 2018 Proms at Prom 9, titled "War & Peace" as a commemoration to the centenary of the end of World War One.

At 79 minutes, one of the longest Ninths recorded is Karl Böhm's, conducting the Vienna Philharmonic in 1981 with Jessye Norman and Plácido Domingo among the soloists.

== Influence ==
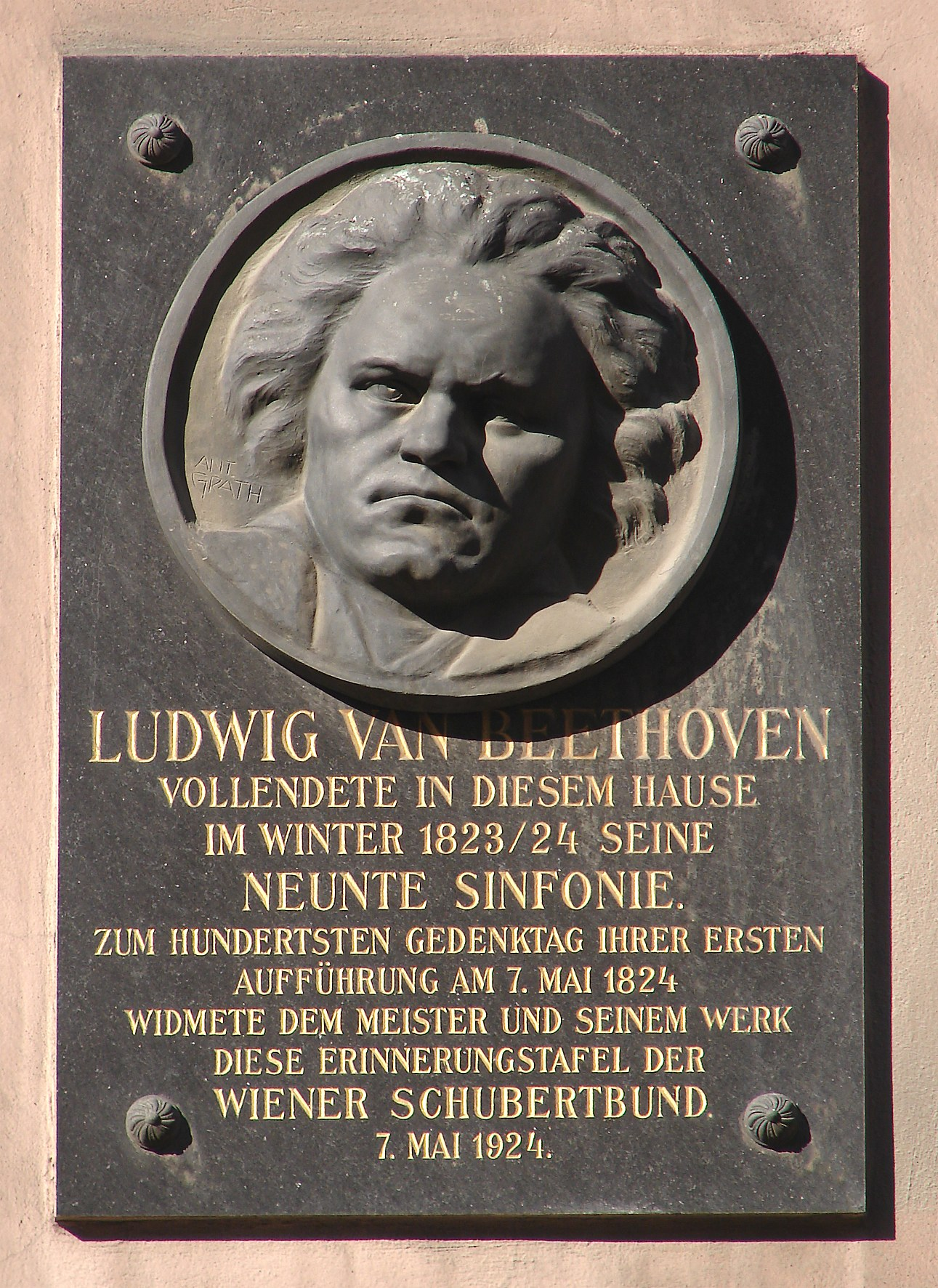
Plaque at building Ungargasse No. 5, Vienna. "Ludwig van Beethoven completed in this house during the winter of 1823/24 his Ninth Symphony. In memory of the centenary of its first performance on 7 May 1824 the Wiener Schubertbund dedicated this memorial plaque to the master and his work on 7 May 1924."

Many later composers of the Romantic period and beyond were influenced by the Ninth Symphony.

An important theme in the finale of Johannes Brahms' Symphony No. 1 in C minor is related to the "Ode to Joy" theme from the last movement of Beethoven's Ninth Symphony. When this was pointed out to Brahms, he is reputed to have retorted "Any fool can see that!" Brahms's first symphony was, at times, both praised and derided as "Beethoven's Tenth".

The Ninth Symphony influenced the forms that Anton Bruckner used for the movements of his symphonies. His Symphony No. 3 is in the same key (D minor) as Beethoven's 9th and makes substantial use of thematic ideas from it. The slow movement of Bruckner's Symphony No. 7 uses the A–B–A–B–A form found in the 3rd movement of Beethoven's piece and takes various figurations from it.

In the opening notes of the third movement of his Symphony No. 9 (From the New World), Antonín Dvořák pays homage to the scherzo of Beethoven's Ninth Symphony with his falling fourths and timpani strokes.

Béla Bartók borrowed the opening motif of the scherzo from Beethoven's Ninth Symphony to introduce the second movement (scherzo) in his own Four Orchestral Pieces, Op. 12 (Sz 51).

Michael Tippett in his Third Symphony (1972) quotes the opening of the finale of Beethoven's Ninth and then criticises the utopian understanding of the brotherhood of man as expressed in the Ode to Joy and instead stresses man's capacity for both good and evil.

In the film The Pervert's Guide to Ideology, the philosopher Slavoj Žižek comments on the use of the Ode by Nazism, Bolshevism, the Chinese Cultural Revolution, the East-West German Olympic team, Southern Rhodesia, Abimael Guzmán (leader of the Shining Path), and the Council of Europe and the European Union.

=== Compact disc format ===
One legend is that the compact disc was deliberately designed to have a 74-minute playing time so that it could accommodate Beethoven's Ninth Symphony. Kees Immink, Philips' chief engineer, who developed the CD, recalls that a commercial tug-of-war between the development partners, Sony and Philips, led to a settlement in a neutral 12-cm diameter format. The 1951 performance of the Ninth Symphony conducted by Furtwängler was brought forward as the perfect excuse for the change, and was put forth in a Philips news release celebrating the 25th anniversary of the Compact Disc as the reason for the 74-minute length.

=== TV theme music ===
The Huntley–Brinkley Report used the opening to the second movement as its theme music during the run of the program on NBC from 1956 until 1970. The theme was taken from the 1952 RCA Victor recording of the Ninth Symphony by the NBC Symphony Orchestra conducted by Arturo Toscanini. A synthesized version of the opening bars of the second movement were also used as the theme for Countdown with Keith Olbermann on MSNBC and Current TV. A rock guitar version of the "Ode to Joy" theme was used as the theme for Suddenly Susan in its first season.

=== Use as (national) anthem ===
Anthem of Europe (short version)

During the division of Germany in the Cold War, the "Ode to Joy" segment of the symphony was played in lieu of a national anthem at the Olympic Games for the United Team of Germany between 1956 and 1968. In 1972, the musical backing (without the words) was adopted as the Anthem of Europe by the Council of Europe and subsequently by the European Communities (now the European Union) in 1985. The "Ode to Joy" with a different vocal was used as the national anthem of Rhodesia between 1974 and 1979, as "Rise, O Voices of Rhodesia". During the early 1990s, South Africa used an instrumental version of "Ode to Joy" in lieu of its national anthem at the time "Die Stem van Suid-Afrika" at sporting events, though it was never actually adopted as an official national anthem.

=== Use as a hymn melody ===
In 1907, the Presbyterian pastor Henry van Dyke Jr. wrote the hymn "Joyful, Joyful, we adore thee" while staying at Williams College. The hymn is commonly sung in English-language churches to the "Ode to Joy" melody from this symphony.

Josephine Daskam Bacon is credited with the poem that became the lyrics in Hymn for Nations (also called Hymn to Nations) set to the Ode to Joy melodic theme of the Finale of the Fourth Movement, as recorded by Paul Robeson, Pete Seeger, and others.

=== Year-end tradition ===
The German workers' movement began the tradition of performing the Ninth Symphony on New Year's Eve in 1918. Performances started at 11 p.m. so that the symphony's finale would be played at the beginning of the new year. This tradition continued during the Nazi period and was also observed by East Germany after the war.

The Ninth Symphony is traditionally performed throughout Japan at the end of the year. In December 2009, for example, there were 55 performances of the symphony by various major orchestras and choirs in Japan. It was introduced to Japan during World War I by German prisoners held at the Bandō prisoner-of-war camp. Japanese orchestras, notably the NHK Symphony Orchestra, began performing the symphony in 1925 and during World War II; the Imperial government promoted performances of the symphony, including on New Year's Eve. In an effort to capitalize on its popularity, orchestras and choruses undergoing economic hard times during Japan's reconstruction performed the piece at year's end. In the 1960s, these year-end performances of the symphony became more widespread, and included the participation of local choirs and orchestras, firmly establishing a tradition that continues today. Some of these performances feature massed choirs of up to 10,000 singers.

WQXR-FM, a classical radio station serving the New York metropolitan area, ends every year with a countdown of the pieces of classical music most requested in a survey held every December; though any piece could win the place of honor and thus welcome the New Year, i.e. play through midnight on January 1, Beethoven's Choral has won in every year on record.

=== Other choral symphonies ===
Prior to Beethoven's ninth, symphonies had not used choral forces and the piece thus established the genre of choral symphony. Numbered choral symphonies as part of a cycle of otherwise instrumental works have subsequently been written by numerous composers, including Felix Mendelssohn, Gustav Mahler, Ralph Vaughan Williams and Charles Ives among many others.

=== Other ninth symphonies ===
The scale and influence of Beethoven's ninth led later composers to ascribe a special significance to their own ninth symphonies, which may have contributed to the cultural phenomenon known as the curse of the ninth. A number of other composers' ninth symphonies also employ a chorus, such as those by Kurt Atterberg, Mieczysław Weinberg, Edmund Rubbra, Hans Werner Henze, and Robert Kyr. Anton Bruckner had not originally intended his unfinished ninth symphony to feature choral forces, but the use of his choral Te Deum in lieu of the uncompleted Finale was supposedly sanctioned by the composer. Dmitri Shostakovich had originally intended his Ninth Symphony to be a large work with chorus and soloists, although the symphony as it eventually appeared was a relatively short work without vocal forces.

Of his own Ninth Symphony, George Lloyd wrote: "When a composer has written eight symphonies he may find that the horizon has been blacked out by the overwhelming image of Beethoven and his one and only Ninth. There are other very good No. 5s and No. 3s, for instance, but how can one possibly have the temerity of trying to write another Ninth Symphony?" Niels Gade composed only eight symphonies, despite living for another twenty years after completing the eighth. He is believed to have replied, when asked why he did not compose another symphony, "There is only one ninth", in reference to Beethoven.
