= Luise Neumann =

German actress

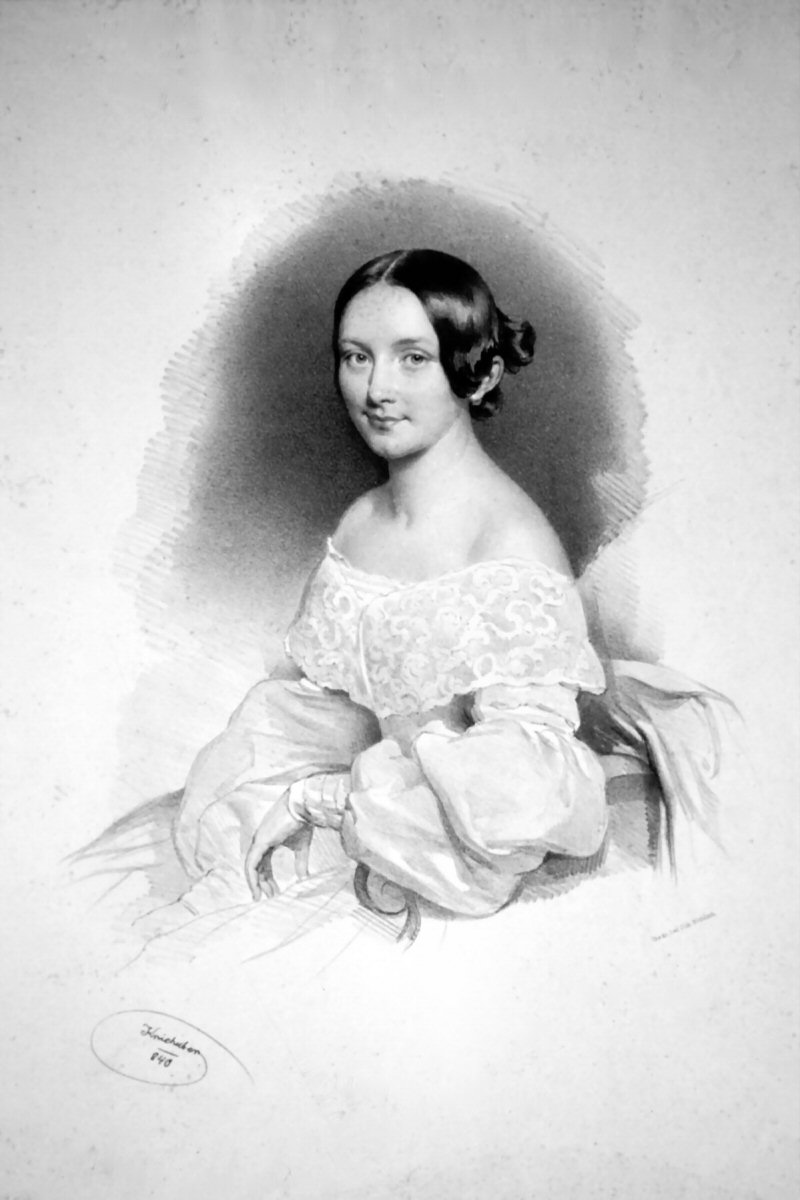
- Born: 7 December 1818; Karlsruhe, Grand Duchy of Baden, German Confederation
- Died: 17 October 1905 (aged 86); Rabensburg, Austria-Hungary

Luise Neumann (7 December 1818 – 17 October 1905) was a German actress, the daughter of the actress Amalie Haizinger. Her younger sister, Adolfine Neumann, was also an esteemed actress of the period.

She made her debut at the age of 16 in a performance of the Deutschen Hausfrau in Karlsruhe. In 1839, she joined the Burgtheater in Vienna, of which she was a member until 1856. On 14 January 1857, she married Karl Graf von Schönfeld and ended her career as an actor.
