= Anton Forti =

Austrian opera singer

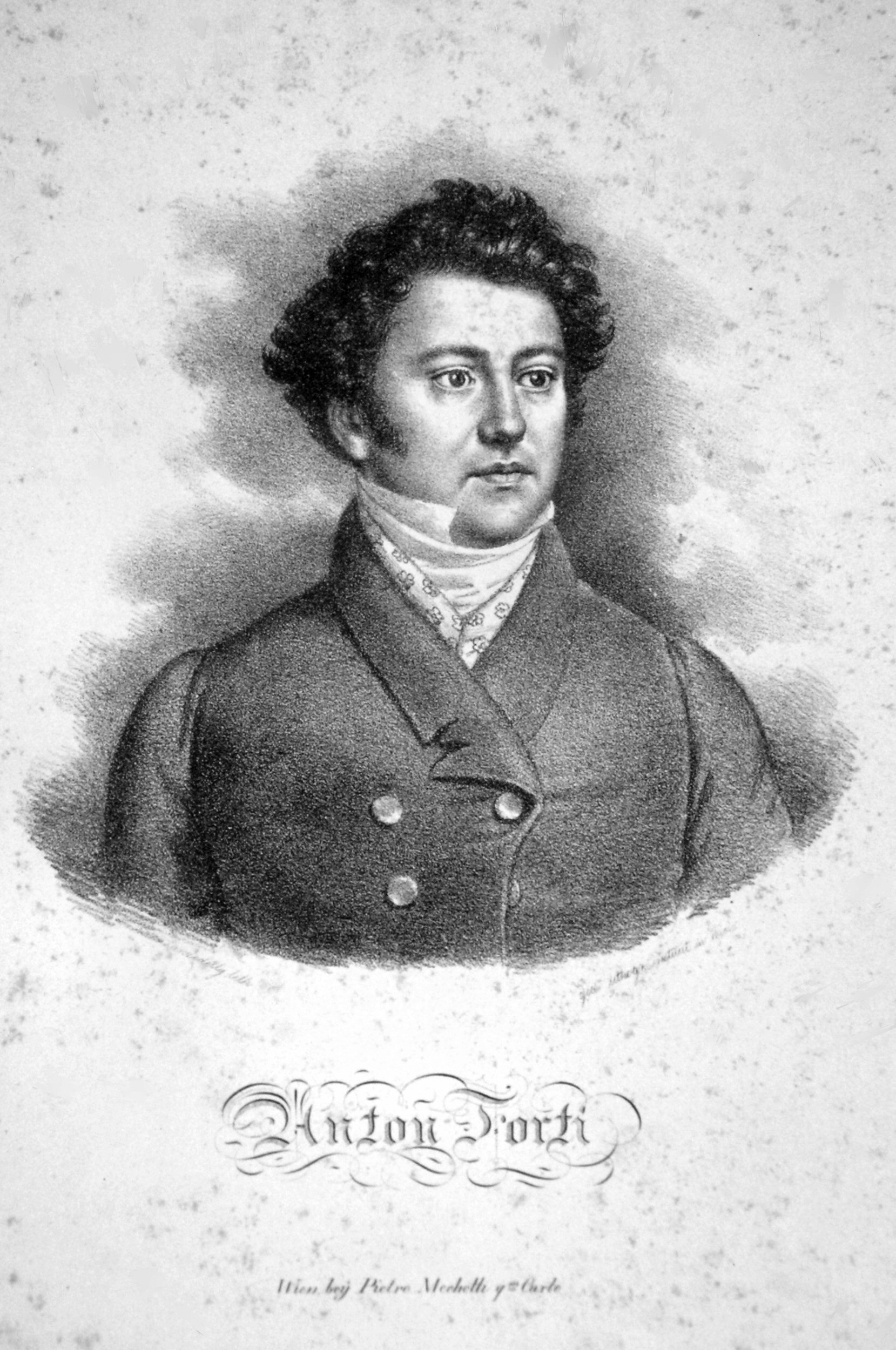
Anton Forti, by Joseph Lanzedelly the Elder

Franz Anton Forti (8 June 1790 – 16 July 1859) was an Austrian operatic baritone. He took leading roles in operas by Mozart and Weber, and in revivals of Beethoven's opera Fidelio. He appeared for many years at the Theater am Kärntnertor, the royal court theater of Vienna.

== Early life and career ==
Forti was born in Vienna on 8 June 1790. He had lessons in singing and the violin. His musical career began as a viola player in the orchestra of the Theater an der Wien. After his debut as a singer in Eisenstadt, he was appointed in December 1807 by Prince Esterházy as a member of his court musicians. He performed for three seasons at the theater in Eisenstadt during which time he portrayed Dandini in the German premiere of Nicolas Isouard's Cendrillon.

From 1811 he appeared at the Theater an der Wien. In that year he was in Mozart's Don Giovanni in the title role; it was, wrote Carl Ferdinand Pohl, "a part for which his very sonorous voice, commanding presence, and elevated refined style of acting eminently fitted him." In 1813 he appeared as Sarastro in Mozart's The Magic Flute. His success in this role led to his engagement at the royal court theater of Vienna, the Theater am Kärntnertor; he was there from May 1814 to April 1828.

On 17 February 1814, he married Henriette Theimer, who had played Zerlina in Don Giovanni.

== Theater am Kärntnertor, and later years ==
He appeared as Pizarro in the revivals of Beethoven's opera Fidelio in 1818, 1822 and 1824. In 1821 he was in the first production in Vienna of Weber's Der Freischütz, as Caspar, and he created the role of Lysiart in Weber's Euryanthe (1823).

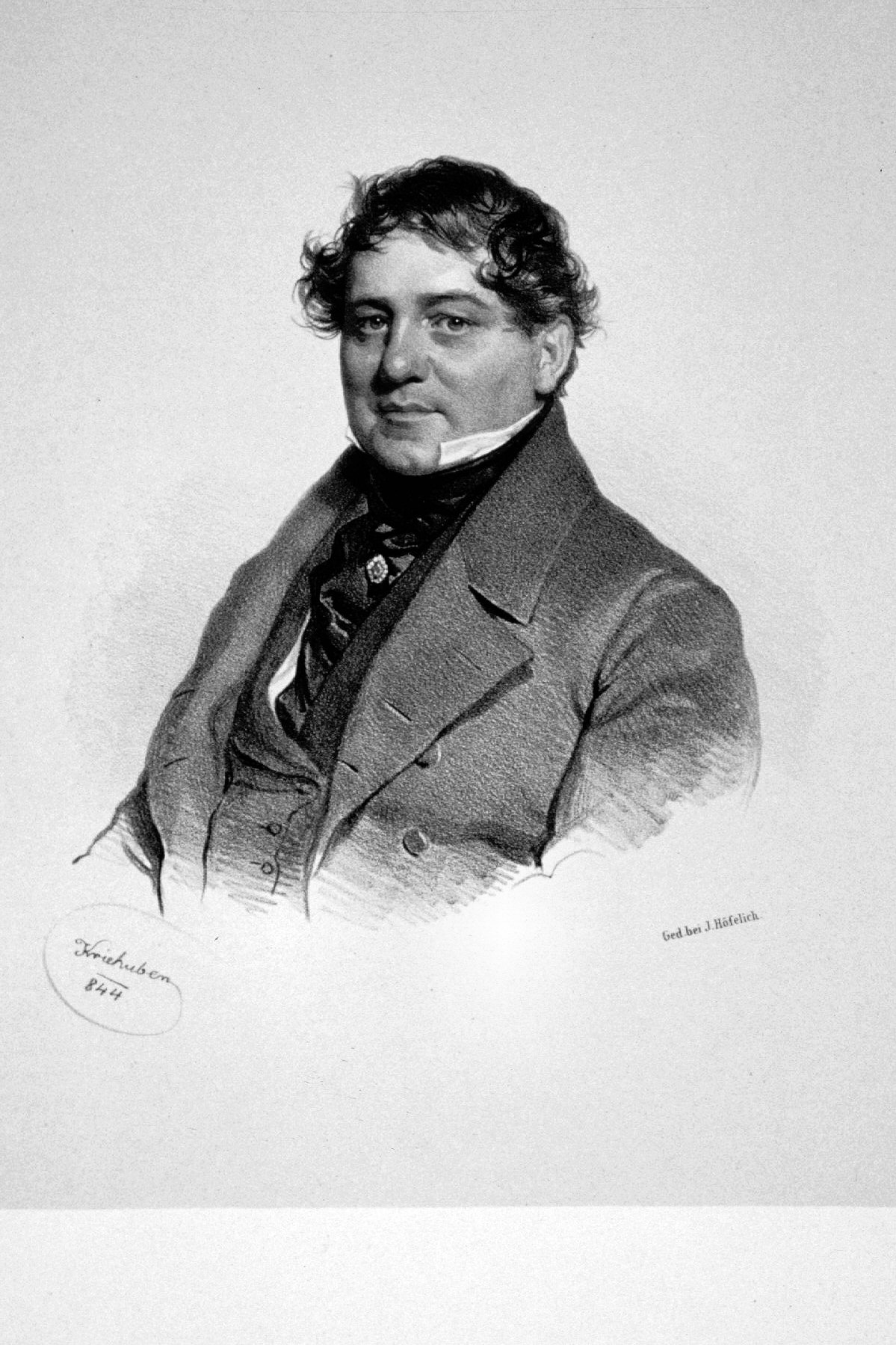
Anton Forti in 1844

In 1829 Wenzel Robert von Gallenberg became lessee of the Theater am Kärntnertor, and Forti was pensioned. He made successful appearances in Prague, Hamburg and Berlin; after his guest appearance in Berlin in June 1829 he was engaged there at the Königsstädtisches Theater until the end of 1830. From 1831 to 1842 he occasionally appeared again at the royal court theater in Vienna. "His voice had lost its charm, and his increasing corpulence spoiled his acting," wrote Carl Ferdinand Pohl.

He retired after winning first prize in a public lottery. In later years he withdrew from public life, suffering from an eye ailment. He died in Vienna in 1859.
