= Amalie Haizinger =

German actress (1800–1884)

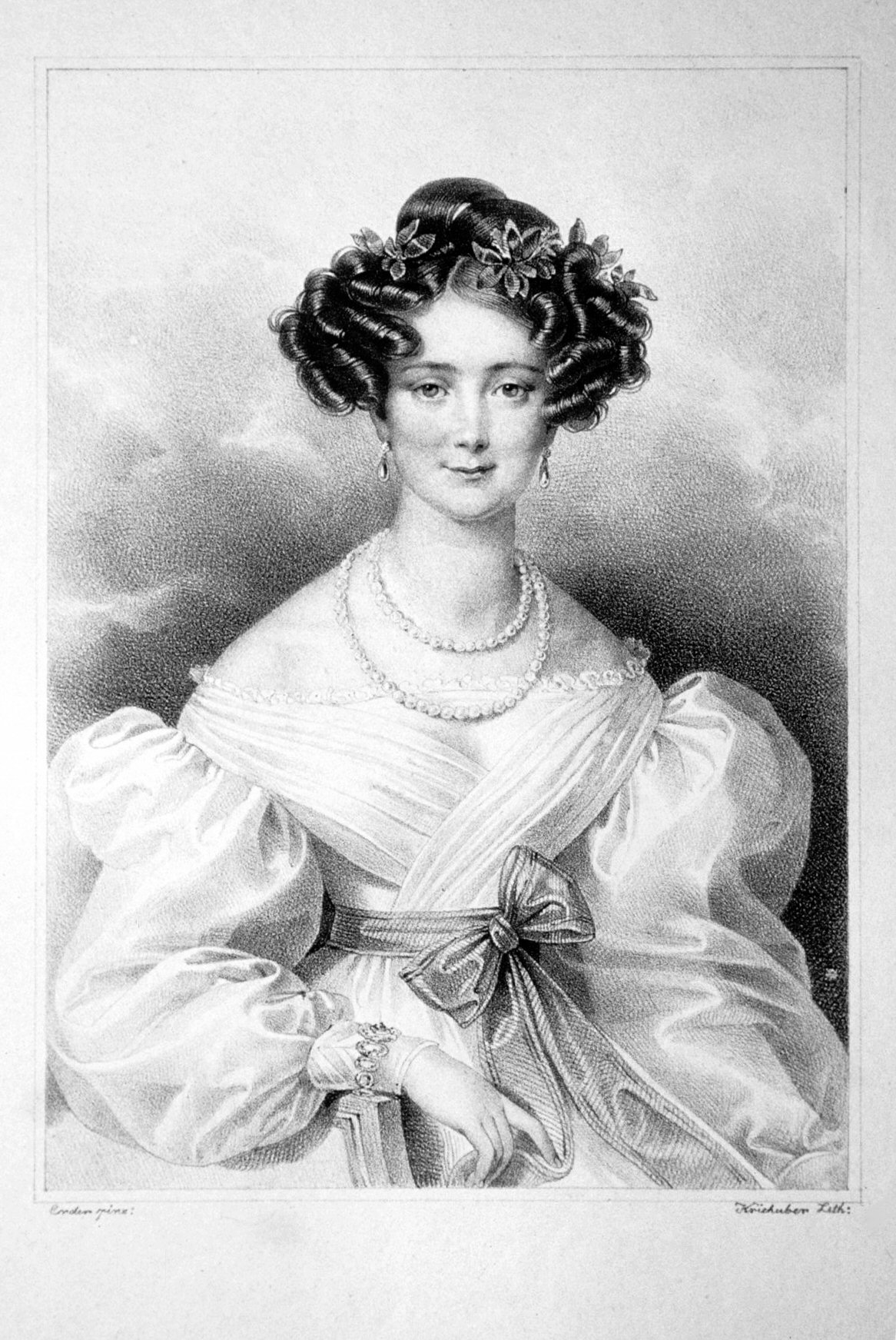
- Amalie Haizinger, Lithograph by Josef Kriehuber, in 1830
- Born: 6 May 1800; Morstadt
- Died: 10 August 1884 (aged 84); Vienna
- Occupation: actor
- Years active: 1810 - 1884
- Spouse(s): Carl Neumann; Anton Haizinger

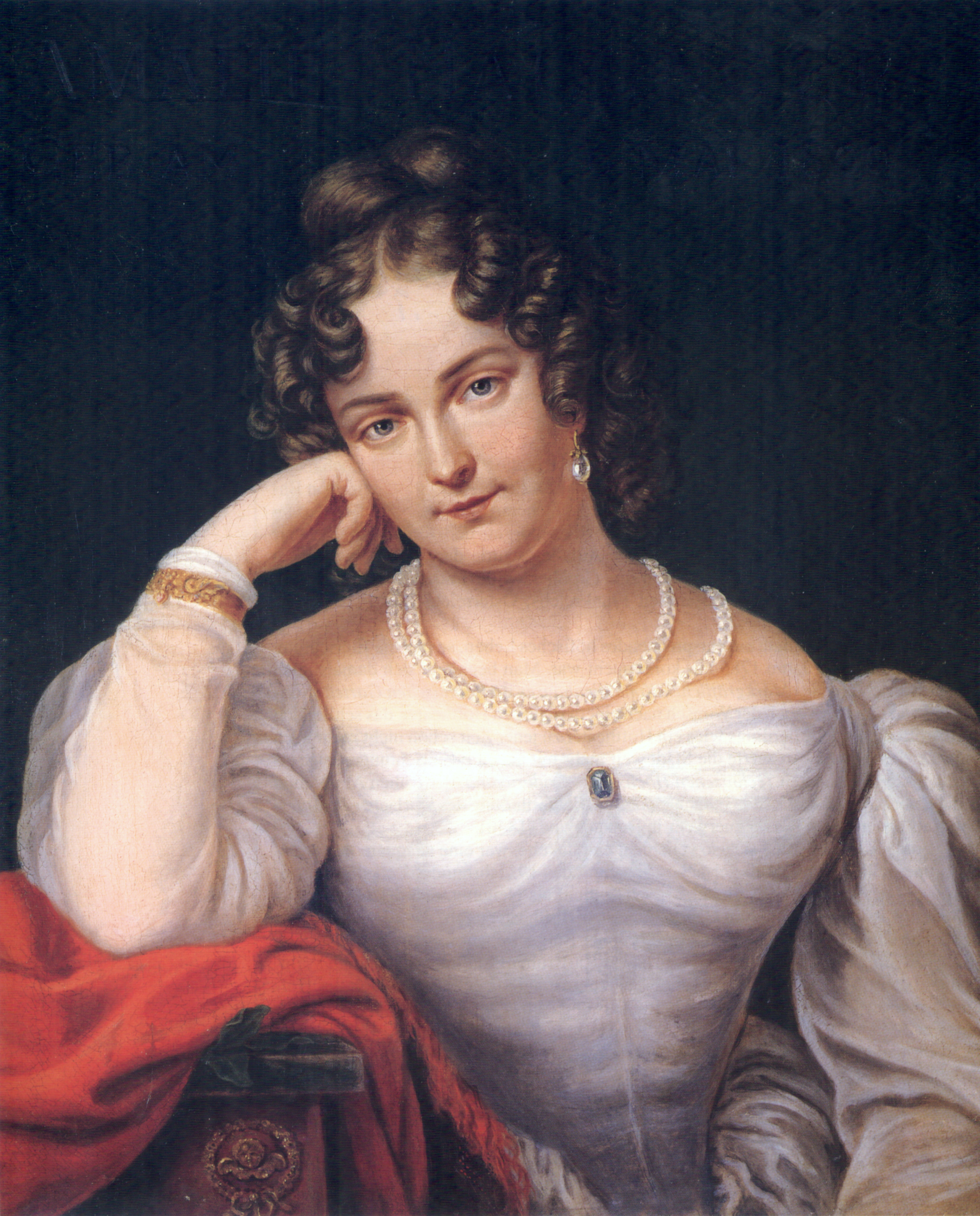
Amalie Haizinger by Franz Seraph Stirnbrand c.1850

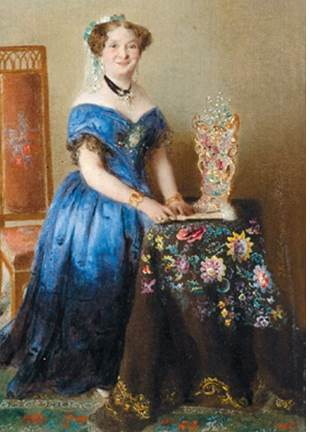
Amalie Haizinger, portrait by Johann Baptist Reiter, 1850

Amalie Haizinger, or Neumann-Haizinger, née Morstadt (6 May 1800 Karlsruhe - 10 August 1884 Vienna) was a German actress.

== Life ==
Haizinger debuted in 1810 at the Karlsruhe Theater. In 1816, she married actor Carl Neumann. Her talent for profitably performing stage plays developed very rapidly. She found enthusiastic applause on tours as far as Paris, London and St. Petersburg.

After the death of her first husband, she married singer Anton Haizinger in 1827 and worked with him in Karlsruhe. There she concentrated on comedy projects. In 1836, a book was published about her. In 1846, she participated in an engagement at the Burgtheater in Vienna, where she worked in the stock "funny old lady" role until her death on 10 August 1884.

To celebrate Haizinger's 50th birthday, Johann Baptist Reiter painted a portrait of her that hangs today in the Schlossmuseum Linz.

== Family ==
With her first husband, Haizinger had two children, Adolphine Neumann and Luise Neumann, who both became notable actresses.

== Awards ==
Haizingergasse, a street in Vienna 18 (Währing), is named after the actress, as well as a high school on that street.

== Sources ==
- Hermann Arthur Lier (1906). "Haizinger, Amalie" . Allgemeine Deutsche Biographie (in German). Vol. 51. Leipzig: Duncker & Humblot. pp. 742–745.
- Konrad Schrögendorfer (1966). "Haizinger, Amalie, geborene Morstadt". Neue Deutsche Biographie (in German). Vol. 7. Berlin: Duncker & Humblot. p. 528. (full text online).
- Constantin von Wurzbach: Haizinger, Amalie. In: Biographisches Lexikon des Kaiserthums Oesterreich. 7. Theil. Kaiserlich-königliche Hof- und Staatsdruckerei, Wien 1861, S. 222–226 (Digitalisat).
- Erinnerungsblätter aus dem Leben und Künstlerwirken der Frau Amalie Haizinger geb. Morstadt, Verlag der D. R. Marr'schen Buch- und Kunsthandlung, Carlsruhe und Baden, 1836, Volltext bei Google Books
- Amalie Haizinger, in: Badische Biographien. Erster Theil. Heidelberg 1875, S. 332 f. (Digitalisat)
