= Joseph Seipelt =

Austrian opera singer

- Born: 5 November 1787; Rajka, Hungary
- Died: 21 February 1847 (aged 59); Vienna, Austria

Joseph Seipelt (5 November 1787 – 21 or 22 February 1847) was an Austrian bass opera singer, composer, and choir director, perhaps best known as the bass soloist at the world premiere of Beethoven's Ninth Symphony in 1824.

Born in Ragendorf, Archduchy of Austria (today Rajka, Hungary), Seipelt received his first music lessons from his father, who died when he was nine years old. He was then taken to live in a monastery in Bratislava by his uncle, Matthew Riediger, for secondary education. He then worked for three years in Trieste at a financial institution, before moving to Vienna.

Seipelt first sang in the chorus in Vienna's Theater an der Wien. Later, he received lessons from Antonio Salieri, before debuting as a bass in Lviv, where he sang the part of Sarastro in Mozart's opera The Magic Flute. This was followed by performances in Sibiu, Timișoara, and, from 1809 to 1812, Linz. Having worked in several different operas in Hungary and Galicia, including the Deutsche Oper in Budapest, he returned to the Vienna theatre, where he performed some of the great roles in the repertory. After retiring as a singer, he took on the role of choir master. On 23 April 1829, he was made an honorary citizen of the city of Vienna.

He created the role of King Louis VI in Carl Maria von Weber's Euryanthe, premiered 25 October 1823. Most famously, on 7 May 1824, he sang the bass part of the world premiere of Beethoven's Symphony No 9.

He also composed several vocal quartets, mostly for male voice. Seipelt died in Vienna.
