= Gustav Hölzel =

Austrian opera singer

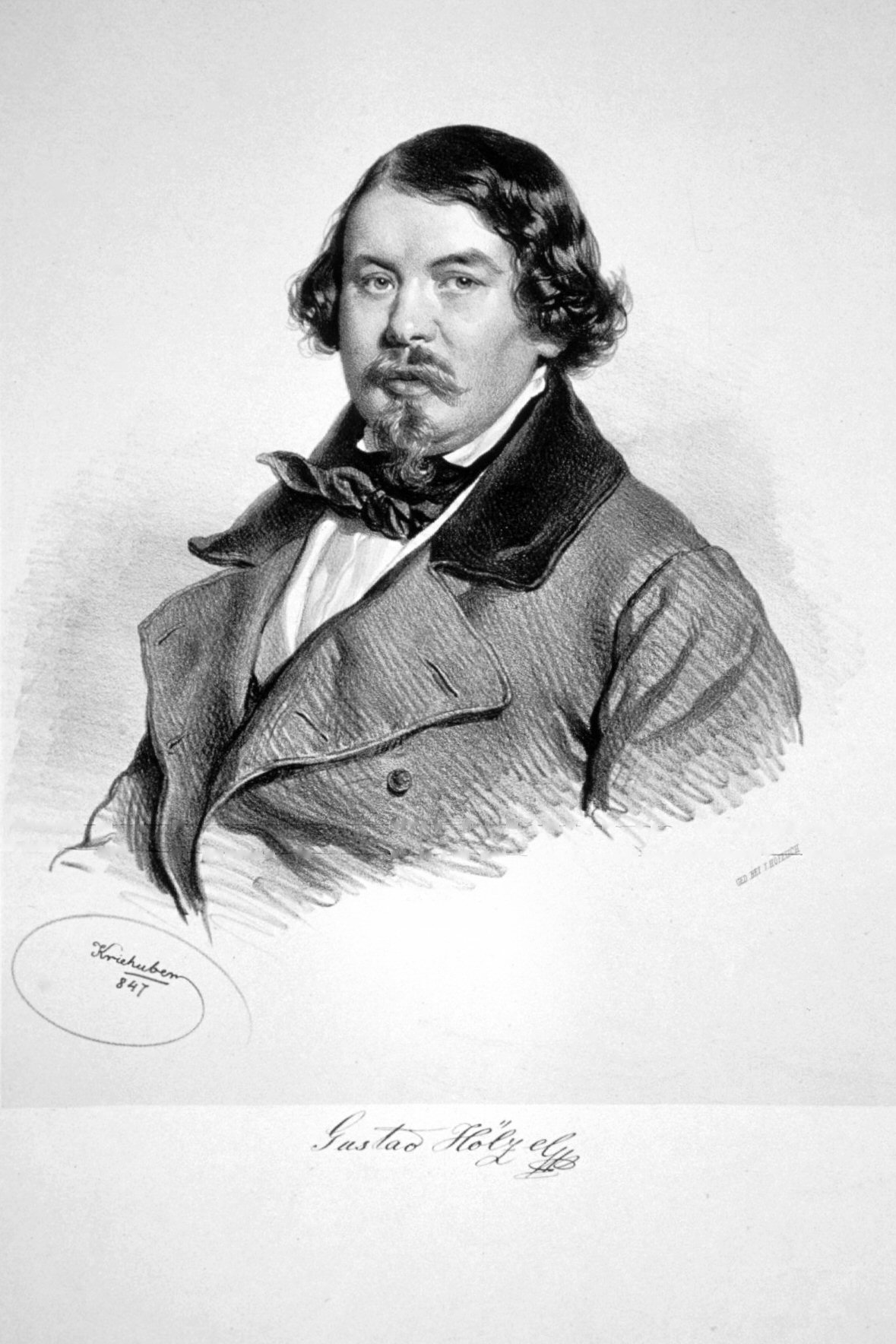
Gustav Hölzel, Lithograph by Josef Kriehuber, 1847

Gustav Hölzel (2 September 1813 – 3 December 1883) was an Austro-Hungarian bass-baritone and composer who sang in the opera-houses of Austria, Germany and elsewhere for nearly fifty years. He is principally remembered as the first Beckmesser in Richard Wagner's Die Meistersinger von Nürnberg.

== Early life ==
He was born in Pest, Hungary, the son of the actor, singer and theatre director Nikolaus Alois Hölzel (1785–1848) who managed the Landestheater in Linz from 1819 until 1924. His mother Elisabeth Hölzel (née Umlauf) was an operatic contralto, daughter of composer Ignaz Umlauf, and sister of composer Michael Umlauf. At the age of sixteen, Gustav made his operatic debut in Sopron, and his career continued in Graz (1830–1832), the Theater in der Josefstadt in Vienna (1833–1837), and the Königsstädtisches Theater in Berlin (1837–1838). He pursued further training in Paris in 1838 before joining the Stadttheater Zürich where he was engaged from 1838 until 1840. In 1840, he joined the Court Opera at the Theater am Kärntnertor in Vienna.

== Later career in Austria and Germany ==
Hölzel sang at the Hofoper for twenty-three years, during which he created the small role of De Fiesque in Gaetano Donizetti's penultimate opera Maria di Rohan in 1843. But in 1863, while playing the role of Friar Tuck in Heinrich Marschner's Der Templer und die Jüdin, Hölzel altered the words of the Friar's song and was dismissed from the company.

He nevertheless found operatic work at the Theater an der Wien, and also appeared in Darmstadt, Nuremberg and Munich. At the Nationaltheater in the latter city, in 1868, he created the role of Beckmesser in Die Meistersinger von Nürnberg His final engagements were at the Komische Oper Berlin, and his last stage appearance was in 1877 in the role of Baculus in Albert Lortzing's Der Wildschütz.

Gustav Hölzel died in Vienna.

== International career and roles ==
He made guest appearances in opera houses in London (1840 and 1843), Saint Petersburg and Stockholm in 1860, and in the American premiere of Mozart's Der Schauspieldirektor at the Stadt Theatre in New York in 1870. At the Opéra Comique in Paris in 1859, he appeared in the premiere of Yvonne by the Belgian composer Armand Limnander.

Hölzel was noted for his comic roles, which included, as well as those mentioned above, Leporello in Don Giovanni, Don Basilio in The Barber of Seville and Van Bett in Lortzing's Zar und Zimmermann.

== Compositions ==
Gustav Hölzel was also a prolific composer of piano music and songs. Among the latter are a setting of Ludwig Uhland's "Sonntag", Op. 226, and three settings of poems by Heinrich Heine, "Die schönsten Augen", Op. 68, "Wasserfahrt", Op. 73, and "Meine Sehnsucht von H. Heine" ("Mädchen mit dem roten Mündchen"), Op. 32.
