= Michael Umlauf =

18/19th-century Austrian composer, conductor, and violinist

Michael Umlauf (August 9, 1781 – June 20, 1842), was an Austrian composer, conductor, and violinist. His father, Ignaz Umlauf, was also a notable composer. His sister, Elisabeth Hölzel (née Umlauf), had a career as a contralto and her son Gustav Hölzel was an important bass-baritone.

Umlauf was born at Vienna. At an early age he became a violinist in the Vienna court orchestra. His earliest known compositions were a series of ballet scores for the court theatres dated 1804. He is listed in the theatre almanac of 1809 as Kapellmeister Gyrowetz’s deputy, and by the 1815 almanac he had advanced to fourth of the six Kapellmeisters at the Kärntnertortheater. Umlauf retired in 1825 during Barbaia’s direction of the court opera, and applied without success for the post of second Kapellmeister at the Stephansdom. It was 1840 before he again came to the fore, this time as music director at the two court theatres, but his lengthy absence had left him quite out of touch and he soon retired again, dying at Baden bei Wien not long after.

Umlauf's name is most familiar from his connections with Ludwig van Beethoven, whose works he conducted on numerous occasions. In 1814 he conducted the premiere of the final revision of Beethoven's only opera, Fidelio. Ten years later, he conducted the premiere of Beethoven's Ninth Symphony.

As a composer Umlauf is best remembered for his ballet scores, especially Paul und Rosette and for four Singspiele: Die Herrenhuterin (1804), Das Fest der Freude und der Liebe (1806), Der Grenadier (1812), and Das Wirtshaus von Granada (1812).

In 1823–24, he was one of the 50 composers who composed a variation on a waltz by Anton Diabelli for Vaterländischer Künstlerverein.

== Sources ==
- Peter Branscombe. The New Grove Dictionary of Opera, edited by Stanley Sadie (1992). ISBN 0-333-73432-7 and ISBN 1-56159-228-5
