= Helmina von Chézy =

German journalist, poet and playwright

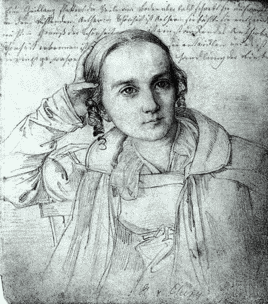
Contemporary portrait

Helmina von Chézy (born Wilhelmine Christiane von Klencke; 26 January 1783 – 28 January 1856) was a German journalist, poet and playwright. She is known for writing the libretto for Carl Maria von Weber's opera Euryanthe (1823) and the play Rosamunde, for which Franz Schubert composed incidental music.

== Life ==
Helmina was born in Berlin, the daughter of Prussian officer Carl Friedrich von Klencke and his wife Caroline Louise von Klencke (1754–1802), daughter of Anna Louisa Karsch and herself a poet. The marriage of her parents had already broken up at her birth and she was partly raised by her grandmother. She started writing at the age of 14.

Married the first time in 1799, she divorced the next year and upon the death of her mother moved to Paris, where she worked as a correspondent for several German papers. From 1803 to 1807 she edited her own Französische Miszellen ("French Miscellanea") journal, commenting on political issues, which earned her trouble with the ubiquitous censors.

In Paris, she befriended Friedrich Schlegel's wife Dorothea, who introduced her to the French orientalist Antoine-Léonard de Chézy. In 1805 they married and Helmina subsequently gave birth to two sons: the later author Wilhelm Theodor von Chézy (1806–1865) and Max von Chézy (1808–1846), who became a painter. In 1810, together with Adelbert von Chamisso, she translated several of Friedrich Schlegel's lectures from French into German. They had a short romantic fling, followed by another extramarital affair of Helmina with the Austrian orientalist Joseph von Hammer-Purgstall, probably the father of another son who died shortly after his birth in 1811.

As her second marriage, too, turned out to be an unhappy one, Helmina finally parted from her husband in 1810. She returned to Germany, where she alternately lived in Heidelberg, Frankfurt, Aschaffenburg and Amorbach. In 1812 she settled in Darmstadt. She witnessed the German campaign of the Napoleonic Wars as a military hospital nurse in Cologne and Namur. After she had openly criticised the miserable conditions in the field, she was accused of libel, but was acquitted by the Berlin Kammergericht court under presiding judge E. T. A. Hoffmann.

From 1817, she lived in Dresden, where she wrote the libretto of Carl Maria von Weber's opera Euryanthe. Weber appreciated her writing but disliked her unbound ambition, speaking of her as a "suave poetess but unbearable woman". Several of her Romantic poems were set to music and Franz Schubert wrote incidental music for her play Rosamunde, which however flopped when it premiered in 1823 at the Vienna Theater an der Wien. Living in Vienna from 1823, she again became politically involved, calling attention to the inhumane working conditions at the saltworks in the Austrian Salzkammergut region. She met Beethoven who was one of her heroes growing up and became good friends with Beethoven and attended his funeral in 1827.

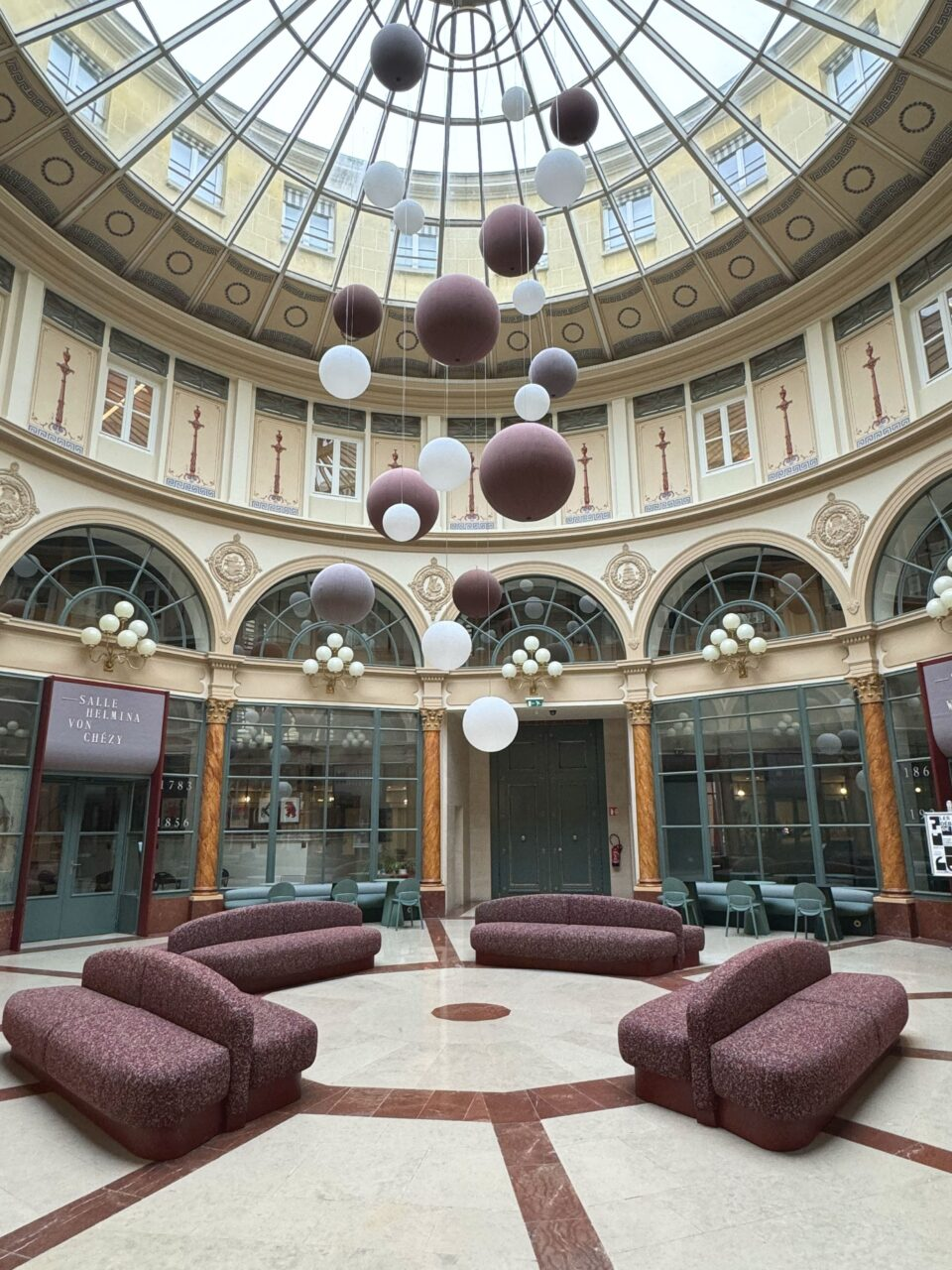
The rotunda of the Galerie Colbert, Salle Helmina von Chézy, Institut National d'Histoire de l'Art, Paris

In 1828/29, her son Max left to live with his father in Paris, which was a grievous blow, exceeded by the message of her husband's death in 1832 and the loss of her annual alimony payment. While Max returned to live with his mother in Munich, her elder son Wilhelm ultimately fell out with Helmina. Upon Max's death in 1846, she remained alone and in despair. Nevertheless, during the 1848 March Revolution she met exiled poet Georg Herwegh in Strasbourg and encouraged him to fight for democracy in nonviolence and by the waiver of radical actions.

Unsuccessfully trying to find another employment as a journalist in order to earn a bare living, she finally retired to Geneva, where she received a modest pension by an artists' charitable foundation. She was by now nearly blind and dependent on care by her niece Bertha Borngräber, who also recorded her memoirs which were revised by Karl August Varnhagen von Ense. She died in Geneva at the age of 73.

Today, a hall of the Institut National d'Histoire de l'Art at Galerie Colbert in Paris is named after Helmina von Chézy.

== Published works ==
Helmina von Chézy's published works as cited by An Encyclopedia of Continental Women Writers. A selection of her works follows.

- Geschichte der schönen und tugendsamen Euryanth, 1804.
- Leben und Kunst in Paris, 2 volumes, 1805-1807.
- Gedichte der Enkelin der Karschin, 2 volumes, 1812.
- Blumen in die Lorbeeren von Deutschlands Rettern gewunden, 1813.
- Die Silberlocke im Briefe, play 1815.
- Gemälte von Heidelberg, 1816.
- Taschenbuch für Reisende und Einheimische in Heidelberg, 1816.
- Emma, eine Geschichte, 1817.
- Neue auserlesene Schriften der Enkenlin der Karschin, 1817.
- Blumen der Liebe, 1818.
- Erzählungen und Novellen, 2 volumes, 1822.
- Euryanthe von Savoyen, 1823.
- Studenblumen, 3 volumes, 1824.
- Der Wunderquell. Eine dramatische Kleinigkeit, 1824.
- Jugendgeschichte, Leben und Ansichten eines papiernen Kragens, 1829.
- Herzenstöne aud Pilgerwegen, 1833.
- Norika. Neues und ausführliches Handbuch für Alpenwanderer und Reisende durch das Hochland und Österreich, 1833.
- Unvergessenes, 2 volumes, 1858.

Editorial work

- Französische Miscellen, 1803-1807.
- Leben und romantische Dichtungen der Tochter der Karschin works of Chézy's mother, Caroline v. Klencke, 1805.
- Aurikeln with autobiography, 1818.
- Altschottische Romanzen, 1818.
- Iduna. Schriften deutscher Frauen gewidmet den Frauen, 1820.

== Literature ==
- Bénédicte Savoy (ed.): Helmina von Chézy. Leben und Kunst in Paris seit Napoleon I., Akademie Verlag, Berlin 2009, ISBN 978-3-05-004628-0.
- David Blankenstein, Nina Struckmeyer & Malte Lohmann: "Helmina von Chézy, une historienne de l'art (?) berlinoise à Paris sous l'Empire", in Mechthild Fend, Melissa Hyde & Anne Lafont (ed.): Plumes et Pinceaux: Discours de femmes sur l'art en Europe (1750-1850) - Essais, Publications de l'Institut National d'Histoire de l'Art, Les Presses du réel, Dijon 2012, pp. 229-244.
- David Blankenstein & Malte Lohmann: "Helmina von Chézy", in: Michel Espagne & Bénédicte Savoy (ed.): Dictionnaire des historiens d’art allemands, Éditions du CNRS, Paris 2010, pp. 35–42.
- David Blankenstein & Nina Struckmeyer: "Saisir la vie, transférer des savoirs: Helmina von Chézy à Paris sous le Premier Empire", in: Histoire de l’art, No. 64, 2009, pp. 95–102.
