= Rosamunde =

Play (1823) by von Chézy with music by Schubert

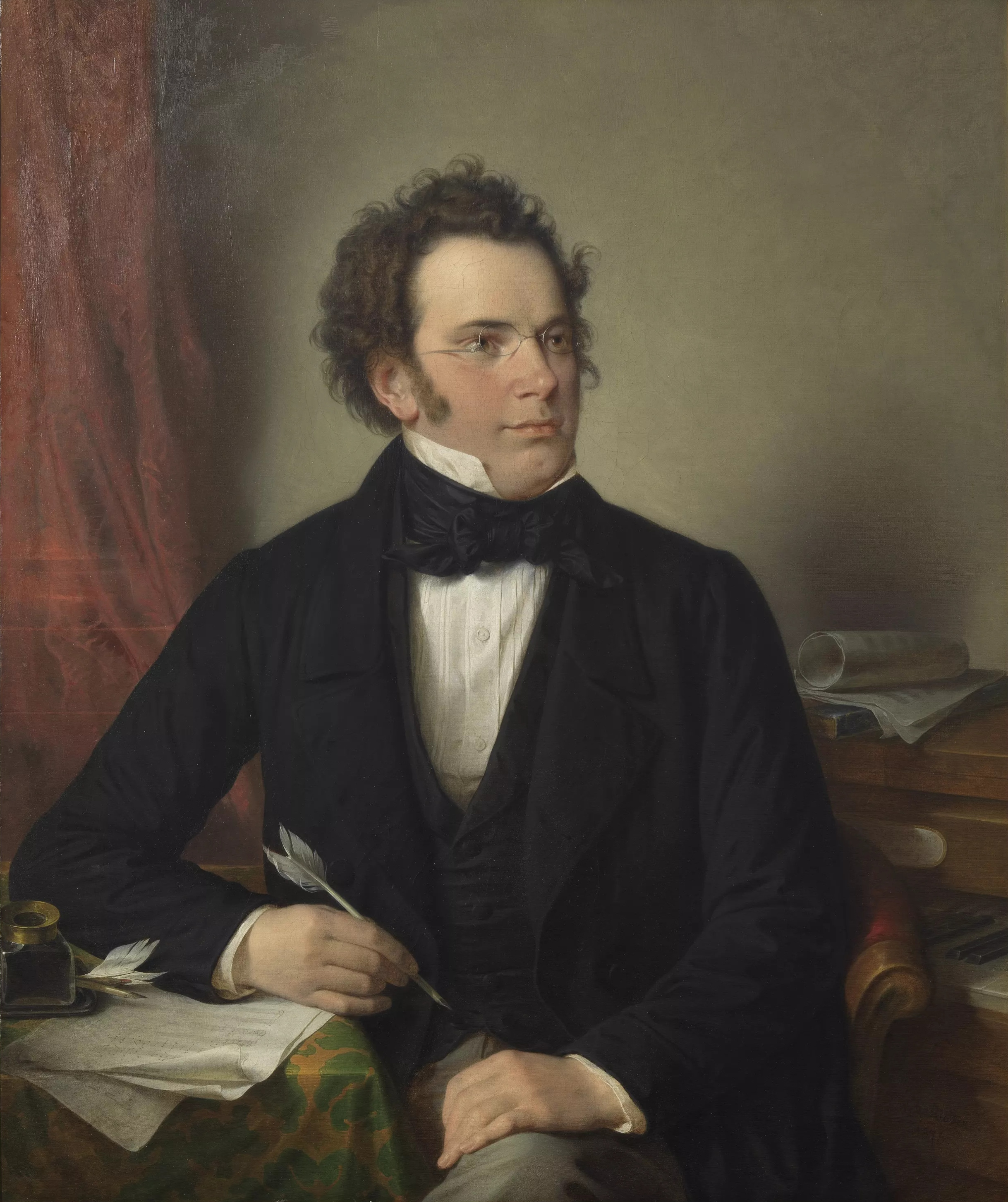
Franz Schubert

Rosamunde, Fürstin von Zypern (Rosamunde, Princess of Cyprus) is a play by Helmina von Chézy, which is primarily remembered for the incidental music which Franz Schubert composed for it. Music and play premiered in Vienna's Theater an der Wien on 20 December 1823.

== The play ==
Rosamunde, Fürstin von Zypern (Rosamunde, Princess of Cyprus) is a play in four acts by Helmina von Chézy, which is primarily known for the incidental music which Franz Schubert composed for it. The premiere of the play took place on 20 December 1823 in Vienna at the Theater an der Wien, but it was not a success. The text of the original play by von Chézy is lost. A modified version in five acts was discovered in the State Library of Württemberg and was published in 1996. Fragmentary autograph sources relating to the original play have been recovered.

=== Plot ===
The story concerns the attempt of Rosamunde, who was brought up incognito as a shepherdess by the mariner's widow Axa, to reclaim her throne. The long-established governor Fulgentius (Fulvio in the revised version), who already has Rosamunde's parents on his conscience, attempts to thwart Rosamunde, initially by intrigue, then by a marriage proposal and finally by an attempt at poisoning. Rosamunde, whose claim is backed by a deed in her father's hand, enjoys the support of the Cypriot people and the Cretan Prince Alfonso, her intended husband. All the attempts of Fulgentius fail; he dies by his own poison, and Rosamunde ascends the throne.

== Schubert's incidental music ==
Schubert's incidental music is scored for orchestra, and for some of the numbers diverse combinations of singers.

=== Overture ===
There are two overtures associated with Rosamunde. The overture used for the stage production was the one Schubert had originally composed for Alfonso und Estrella, but Schubert thought it less suitable for that opera. The first publication that linked the overture of Die Zauberharfe (The Magic Harp) with the incidental music for Rosamunde was an 1855 publication of the score parts of that overture, linking it with the drama Rosamunde. There is however no proof it was ever Schubert's intention to associate it with the rest of the Rosamunde music.

=== Incidental music ===
The ten numbers of the Rosamunde incidental music, D. 797, are:

1. Entr'acte No. 1, in B minor (Allegro molto moderato), which may have been originally intended as the finale to Schubert's "Unfinished" Symphony.
2. Ballet music No. 1, really two pieces in one. The first is a march in B minor (Allegro moderato) beginning with a modified version of the opening theme of the first entr'acte. Like the entr'acte, this ends in B major. A bridge passage leads to a lyrical piece in G major bearing the tempo marking of Andante un poco assai.
3. a. Entr'acte No. 2 in D major (Andante), the outer sections of which have the same thematic material as those of No. 5, the "Chorus of Spirits." The central sections of both, though different, are in a similar mood. b. Romanze, "Der Vollmond Strahlt auf Bergeshöh'n" (The Full Moon Shines on the Mountain Height) (Andante con moto) in F minor and major for alto and orchestra.
4. Geisterchor (Chorus of Spirits), "In der Tiefe wohnt das Licht" (In the Deep Dwells the Light) in D major (Adagio), accompanying the brewing of the poison.
5. Entr'acte No. 3 in B♭ major (Andantino) is one of the two best-known pieces in the score. The main theme was used again in the Impromptu in B♭, Op. 142 (D. 935), No. 3. Schubert used an almost identical theme in the second movement of his String Quartet in A minor, D. 804, which is hence nicknamed the "Rosamunde" Quartet. The Entr'acte No. 2 has also been used by William Carragan in his completion of the Finale of the "Unfinished" Symphony.
6. Hirtenmelodien (Shepherds' Melodies) in B♭ major (Andante), a sextet for clarinets, bassoons and horns.
7. Hirtenchor (Shepherds' Chorus), "Hier auf den Fluren" (Here on the Fields) in B♭ major (Allegretto).
8. Jägerchor (Hunters' Chorus), "Wie lebt sich's so fröhlich im Grünen" (How Merry Life is in the Country) in D major (Allegro moderato).
9. Ballet No. 2 an Andantino in G major.

=== Score ===
No. 3b was published in 1824 as Op. 26, in a version with piano accompaniment. Nos. 8, 4 and 7 were possibly first published in the same series. Other publications with one or more numbers followed. By 1867 all numbers except 3a and 6 had been published in one or more versions.

The English music writer George Grove and his friend the composer Arthur Sullivan rediscovered the original manuscript parts of the music when they visited Vienna in 1867 specifically to research Schubert. Grove wrote:

I found, at the bottom of the cupboard, and in its farthest corner, a bundle of music-books two feet high, carefully tied round, and black with the undisturbed dust of nearly half-a-century. … These were the part-books of the whole of the music in Rosamunde, tied up after the second performance in December, 1823, and probably never disturbed since. Dr. Schneider [Schubert's nephew] must have been amused at our excitement; but let us hope that he recollected his own days of rapture; at any rate, he kindly overlooked it, and gave us permission to take away with us and copy what we wanted.

It was not until Series XV, Volume 4 of the Breitkopf & Härtel Gesammtausgabe was published in 1891 that all the numbers of the incidental music were joined in one publication, with the full orchestration.

=== Performance history ===
Excerpts from the Rosamunde music are frequently performed, and are some of Schubert's most performed pieces. They have been recorded several times, including versions conducted by Kurt Masur and Claudio Abbado.

The complete score, which lasts an hour, is seldom heard. In one rare performance, the Chamber Orchestra of Europe, directed by Nikolaus Harnoncourt, performed the full score at the Styriarte festival in Graz, Austria, in June 2004. The Arnold Schoenberg Choir sang the vocal parts with soloists Elisabeth von Magnus and Florian Boesch.

== Other uses of the music ==
The overture was used for a ballet sequence in the 1952 Samuel Goldwyn film Hans Christian Andersen, starring Danny Kaye. The ballet sequence was danced by Zizi Jeanmaire. A fragment of Entr'acte #2 was used in many episodes of Wings of the Red Star. Another excerpt was incorporated into the Christmas carol Mille cherubini in coro, a song made popular by Luciano Pavarotti in a 1980 TV Christmas programme.

== Sources ==
- (in German) Franz Schubert's Werke: Kritisch durchgesehene Gesammtausgabe (AGA): Leipzig, Breitkopf & Härtel:
  - Johann Nepomuk Fuchs, (ed.) Serie 15: Dramatische Musik, Volume 4 — No. 8 (1891).
- Deutsch, Otto Erich (1978). Diirr, Walther; Fei, Arnold; Landon, Christa (eds.). Franz Schubert. Thematisches Verzeichnis seiner Werke in chronologischer Folge (in German). Kassel: Barenreiter. ISBN 978-37618-0-571-8.
- Waidelich, Gerrit (1996). "Rosamunde: Drama in fünf Akten von Helmina von Chézy — Musik von Franz Schubert". In Hilmar, Ernst (ed.). IFSI (in German). Vol. 12 (Revised version - 1st ed.). Tutzing.
- (in German) Gerrit Waidelich. "Ein fragmentarischer autographer Entwurf zur Erstfassung von Chézys Schauspiel Rosamunde". in: IFSI, Mitteilungen 18, Tutzing 1997, pp. 46–57.
- (in German) Gerrit Waidelich. "Die vermeintlich verschollene Rosamunde. Zur Quellenlage von Helmina von Chézys Schauspiel und Franz Schuberts dazugehöriger Schauspielmusik (Teil 1)," in Sullivan-Journal. Magazin der Deutschen Sullivan-Gesellschaft e. V. (Hrsg. von Meinhard Saremba) – Nr. 11 (Juni 2014), S. 63–72. ISSN 2190-0647.
- (in German) Gerrit Waidelich. "''Nicht das Verdienst der im J. 867 nach Wien gekommenen Englishmen“? Legenden und Tatsachen zu Sullivans und Groves Sichtung des staubigen' Aufführungsmaterials von Schuberts Rosamunde-Musik (Teil II)," in Sullivan-Journal. Magazin der Deutschen Sullivan-Gesellschaft e. V. – Nr. 13 (Juli 2015), S. 18–32. ISSN 2190-0647.
