= Ignaz Umlauf =

Austrian composer

Ignaz Umlauf (1746-1796) was an Austrian composer. He was Kapellmeister of the new German National Singspiel of Emperor Joseph II beginning in 1778 until his death. His son Michael Umlauf (1781-1842) was also a notable composer, and his daughter Elisabeth, mother of the composer Gustav Hölzel, was an operatic contralto.

== Works ==
- Die Bergknappen Singspiel in 1778, featuring Caterina Cavalieri, and the first Singspiel by an Austrian composer to be performed in Vienna.
- Die schöne Schusterin - notable for two extra arias "O welch' ein Leben," for tenor, (WoO 91/1) and "Soll ein Schuh nicht drücken" (WoO 91/2) composed by Beethoven for insertion into the Singspiel's revival in 1795.
