= Joseph von Auffenberg =

German dramatist (1798-1857)

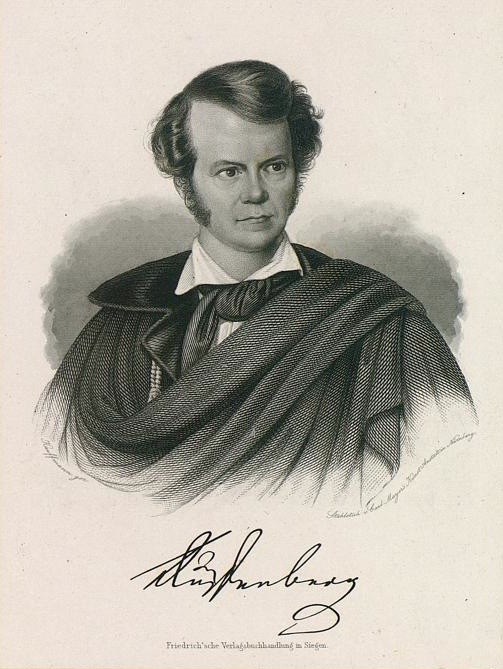
- Born: 25 August 1798; Freiburg, Germany
- Died: 25 December 1857 (aged 59)
- Occupation: dramatist

Joseph von Auffenberg (25 August 1798 Freiburg – 25 December 1857 Freiburg) was a German dramatist.

== Biography ==
After studying law in the Freiburg University, he entered the army, where he attained the rank of lieutenant of the horse guards. Several years afterward he became president of the committee of the court theatre at Karlsruhe.

== Works ==
Among his more important productions are Pizzaro (1823), Ludwig XI in Peronne, Die Filibustier, Konich Erich, Das Opfer des Themistokles, Fergus MacIvor, Der Löwe von Kurdistan (1827), Alhambra and Das Nordlicht von Kasan. His collected works were published at Wiesbaden in 1855 in 22 volumes.
