= Głogówek =

Town in Silesia

Głogówek Oberglogau
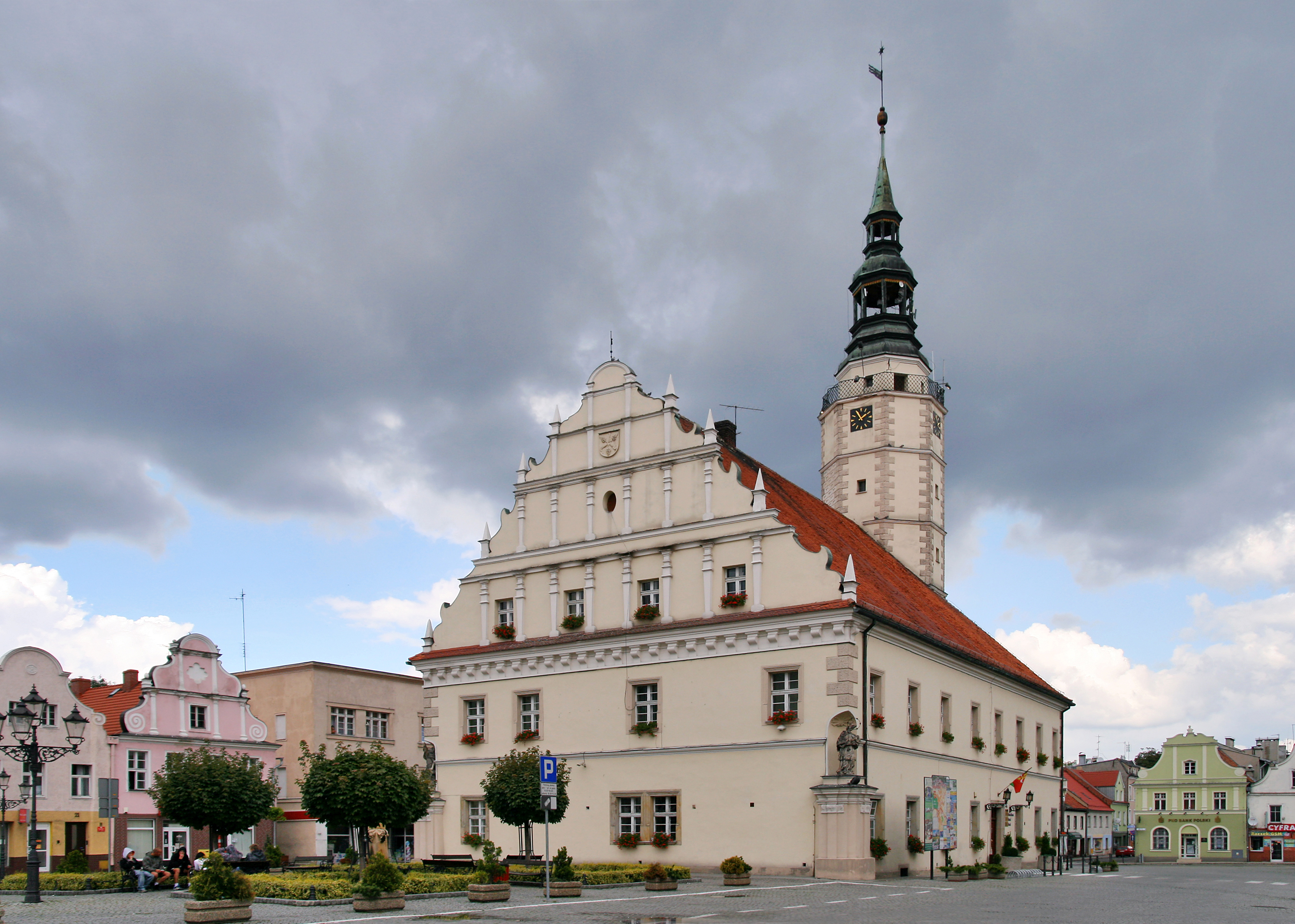
- Town Hall on Main Square

- Flag Coat of arms

- Location within Poland
- Coordinates: 50°20′38″N 17°52′2″E
- Country: Poland
- Voivodeship: Opole
- County: Prudnik
- Gmina: Głogówek
- Established: 11th century
- Town rights: 1275

Government
  - Mayor: Piotr Bujak

Area
  - Total: 22.06 km^{2} (8.52 sq mi)
- Elevation: 212 m (696 ft)

Population (2019-06-30)
  - Total: 5,592
  - Density: 253.5/km^{2} (656.5/sq mi)
- Time zone: UTC+1 (CET)
  - Summer (DST): UTC+2 (CEST)
- Postal code: 48-250
- Area code: +48 77
- Car plates: OPR
- Website: http://www.glogowek.pl

Głogówek ([ɡwɔˈɡuvɛk], German: Oberglogau, Czech: Horní Hlohov, Silesian: Gogōwek) is a small historic town in southern Poland. It is situated on the Osobloga River, in Opole Voivodeship of the greater Silesian region. The city lies approximately 35 kilometres (22 miles) from Opole, the capital of the voivodeship, and is about 10 km (6 mi) from the Czech border. The name of the city comes from the Polish word głóg, meaning 'hawthorn'. The plant was abundant in the area when the city was founded. The town is well known for its preserved medieval core, market square and many architectural monuments.

Since 2009, the town has been bilingual in Polish and German, a substantial German minority having remained in the area after the bulk of Silesia was ceded to Poland at the end of World War II.

== History ==
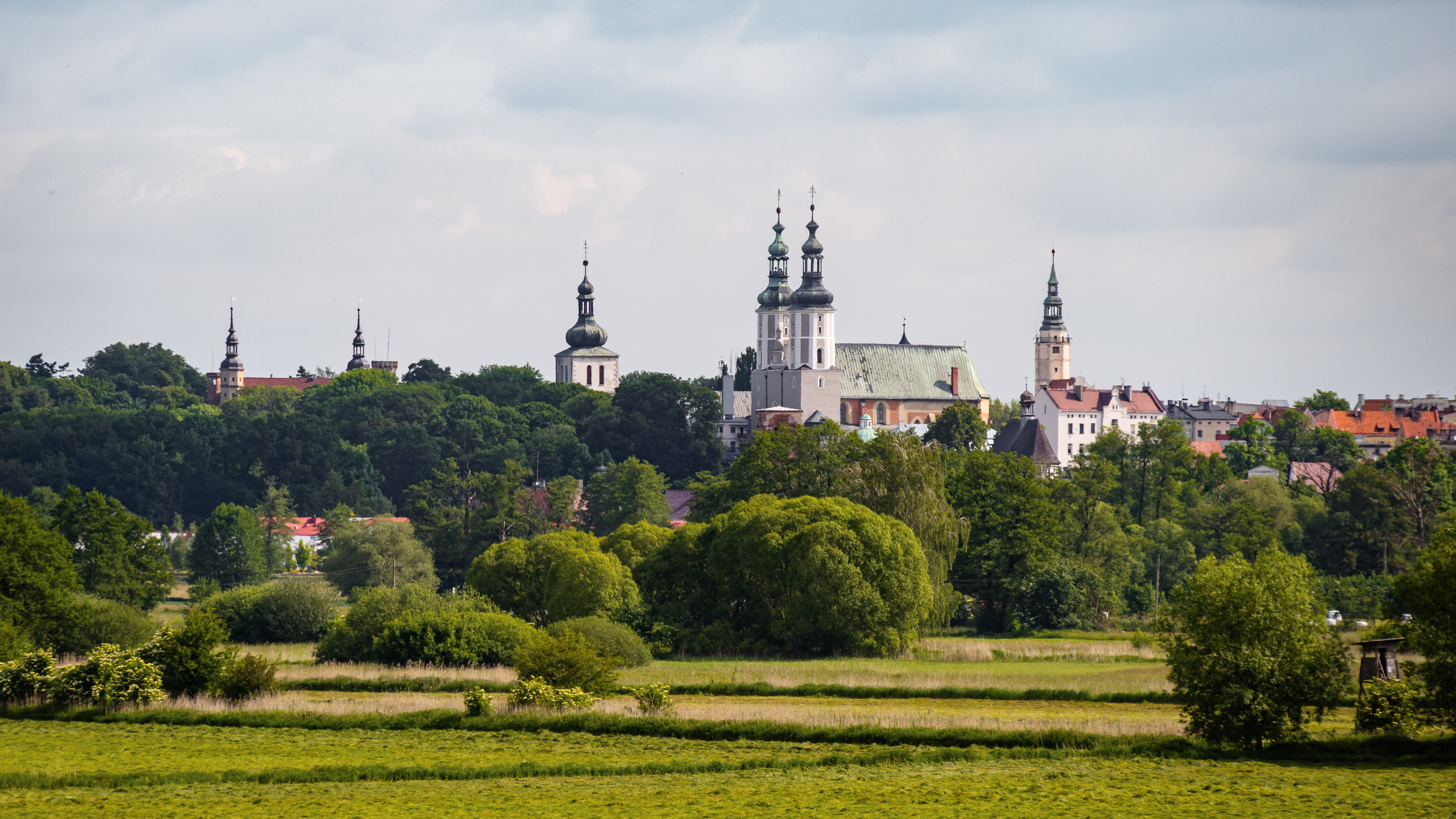
A distant view of the town from the surrounding fields

Previously, it was believed that the first historical mention of Głogówek was in the year 1076, however this is now known to be false. The sources which frequently cited the city's 11th-century founding were misinterpreted, and referred instead to the Lower Silesian town of Głogów. Given the ages of some texts, a mistake in identifying the first historical mentions of the two settlements is understandable. At the time, military conflict in the region was common, and the use of the Głogów fortress may very well have inspired the names of smaller villages in the surrounding area, causing the confusion.

The first unequivocal historical mention of Głogówek in a Silesian source dates from 1212. This source is a list of villages which were in the tithing area of the Leubus Cloister. The village was referred to as "Glogov" in the Latin text, which describes, in some detail, the boundaries of the village. This description could only apply to the present-day village, and is considered to be the first unambiguous mention of Głogówek. It was part of the Duchy of Opole of fragmented Piast-ruled Poland. Town privileges were granted to Głogówek by local dukes in 1275. Another error in Silesian record-keeping states that Głogówek, still a fairly small town, had 12 official representatives, a number much too large for a city of that size. Wrocław, the largest city in the province nowadays, had only five at the time.

In 1327, Głogówek fell under Bohemian suzerainty, however, it remained under the rule of local Polish dukes of the Piast dynasty until 1532. The town's city rights were renewed again in 1373, this time under the Magdeburg rights provision. In 1379, a church, Saint Bartholomew's, was built. Only a few years later, the duke Vladislaus II of Opole (+1401), built another large cloister in Mochów, associated with Częstochowa in the area. From 1420 to 1460 Głogówek was the capital of the Duchy of Głogówek and Prudnik, which in 1460 was reintegrated with the Duchy of Opole.

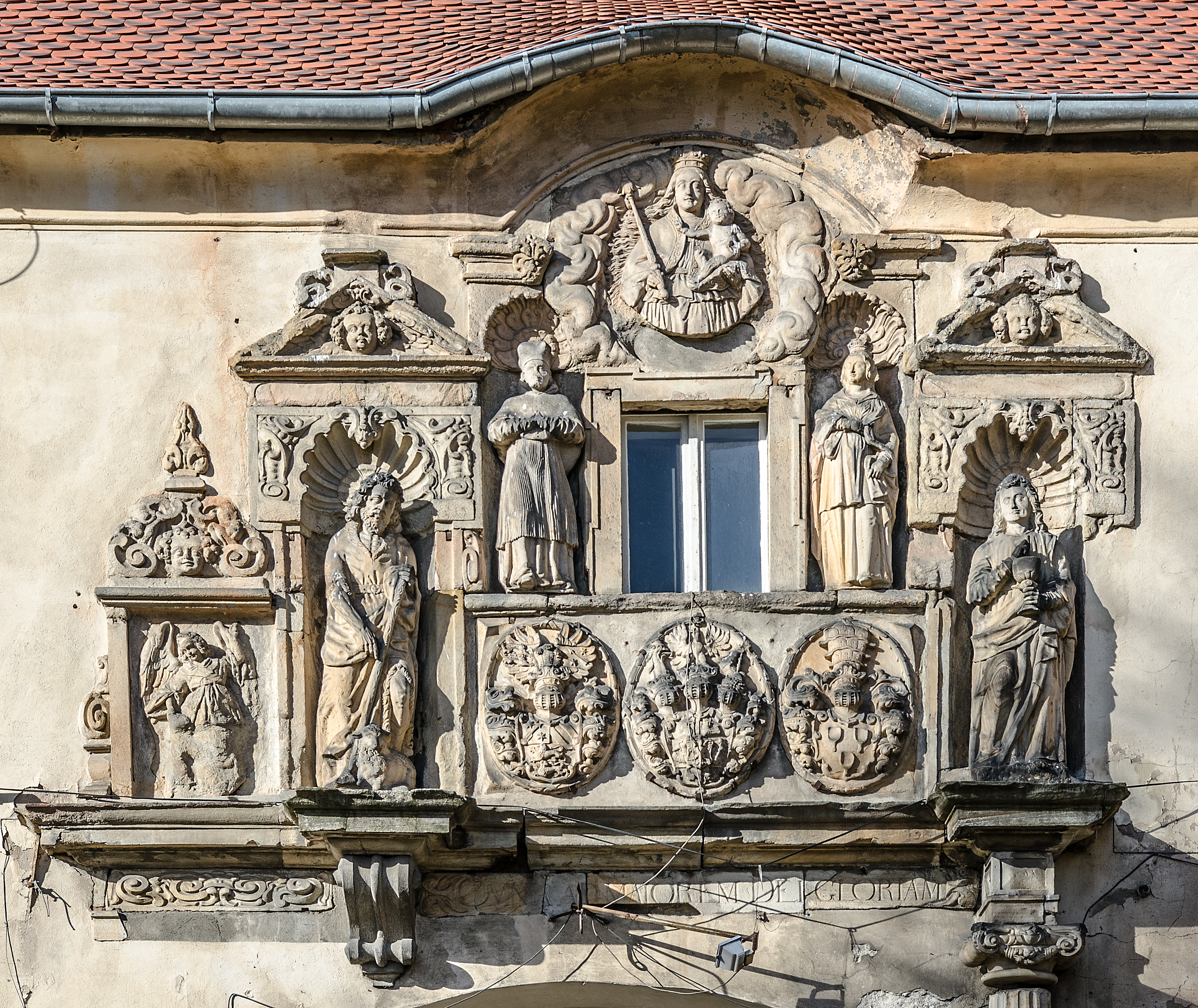
Reliefs on the facade of the Mannerist-Baroque castle

In 1532 the town was incorporated into the Habsburg Empire as part of the Bohemian Crown Lands. From the late 16th century it was owned by the Oppersdorff family. George III Oppersdorff, as a supporter of Catholicism, built several chapels in the 17th century and made the town a regional pilgrimage destination. Due to his Catholicism, during the Thirty Years' War, he had to take refuge in nearby Poland, where, thanks to the help of Polish king Władysław IV Vasa, he stayed at the Wawel and Niepołomice royal castles. During the war, in 1632, the town was invaded and partly destroyed by Saxon troops, and in 1643, it was largely destroyed by the Swedes and about 500 of its inhabitants died of an epidemic. During the Swedish invasion of Poland, Polish King John II Casimir Vasa stayed in the castle in Głogówek from October 17, 1655, until December 18 of the same year. Hetman Stefan Czarniecki, poet Jan Andrzej Morsztyn, future king Michał Korybut Wiśniowiecki, and parliamentarian Jakub Sobieski, father of the future king John III Sobieski, also visited the town at that time. John II Casimir Vasa visited the town again, after his abdication, in 1669.

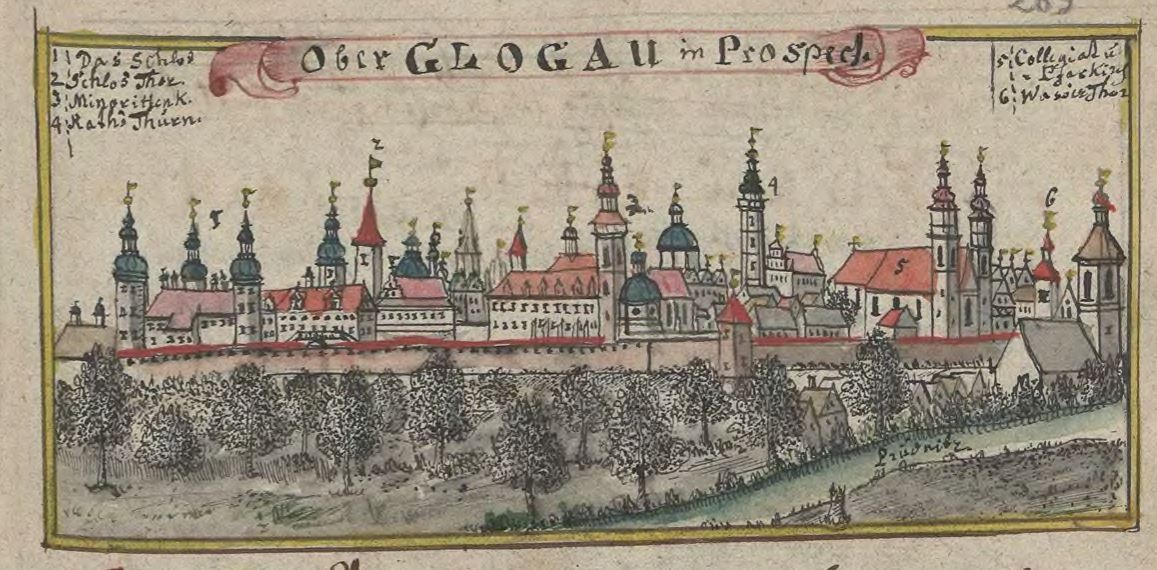
View of the town from the mid-18th century by Friedrich Bernhard Werner

After the First Silesian War in the mid-18th century, Głogówek, under its German name Oberglogau, came under Prussian control. The town was, for the most part, destroyed in a large fire in 1765. In addition, Ludwig van Beethoven came to stay in the castle, using it to finish his fourth symphony. From 1871 the town was part of the German Empire. It was connected to the railroad network in 1876 when its population, which was almost completely bilingual, stood at 6,000.

After World War I, Oberglogau became part of the Weimar Republic. In the Upper Silesia plebiscite mandated by the Versailles Treaty 4,995 inhabitants (95.9%) voted for remaining part of Germany. 215 inhabitants (4.1%) voted for Poland. The town's ordynat John George Oppersdorff, who advocated the reintegration of the town with Poland, in 1930 as punishment for his pro-Polish stance was forced to renounce his fee tail and hand it over to his son who in turn left the town in 1945 before the approaching Soviets. In the interwar period, a local branch of the Union of Poles in Germany was located in the town, and in 1931 the Polish Bank Ludowy ("People's Bank") was founded. Polish activist were persecuted since 1937, and, after the German invasion of Poland, which started World War II, the assets of the Polish bank were confiscated. In 1938, the German mayor removed the Baroque Marian column from the Market Square. In 1936, the town had 7,742 inhabitants.

During the Second World War, the town was the base for a working party (E600) of British and Commonwealth prisoners of war, under the administration of the Stalag VIII-B/344 prisoner-of-war camp at Lamsdorf (currently Łambinowice). The prisoners were working in a sugar beet factory (Hotzenplotzer Zuckerfabrik). In 1942 the historic church bell from the Franciscan church was taken to Western Germany for armaments. In January 1945, as the Soviet armies resumed their offensive and advanced from the east, the prisoners were marched westward in the so-called Long March or Death March. Many of them died from exposure or exhaustion. Some prisoners got far enough to the west to be liberated by the allied armies after some four months of travelling on foot in appalling conditions. 40% of the town were destroyed during the war.

After the war, the town was placed under Polish administration in accordance with the Potsdam Agreement (pending a final peace conference which eventually never took place) and renamed to Głogówek. Contrary to most other towns in Silesia, not the entire German population was expelled. For this reason, a German minority has remained in the town. Since 2009, the town has been officially bilingual in Polish and German.

Fortunately, the old church bell survived the war, and was found in 1949 in Hamburg, then was placed in a church in Fulda, West Germany before returning to Głogówek in 1994, whereas the Marian column returned to Głogówek in 1960. In 1975 the Regional Museum of Głogówek was founded in the castle complex.

Sights of Głogówek (examples)

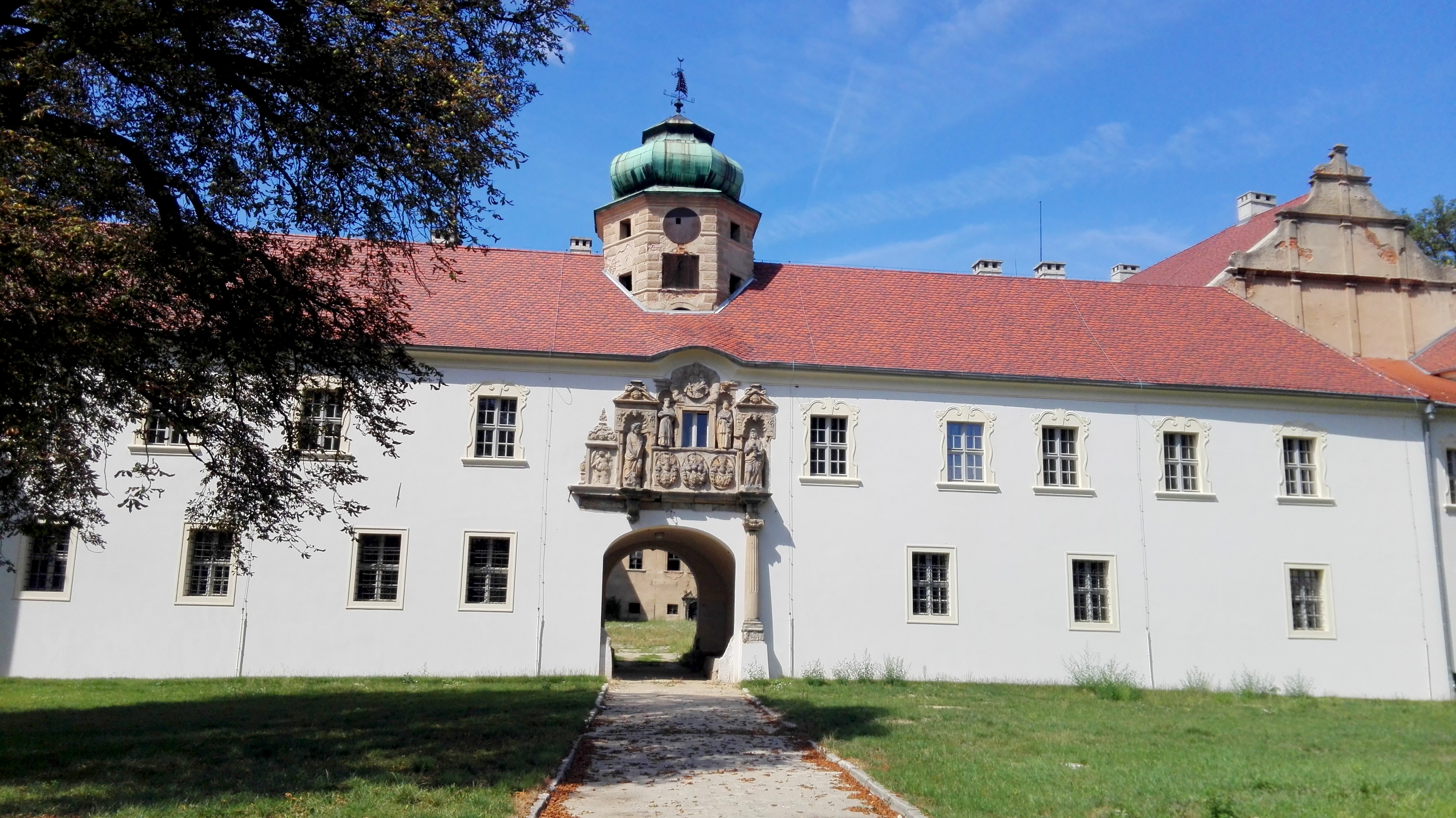
Castle

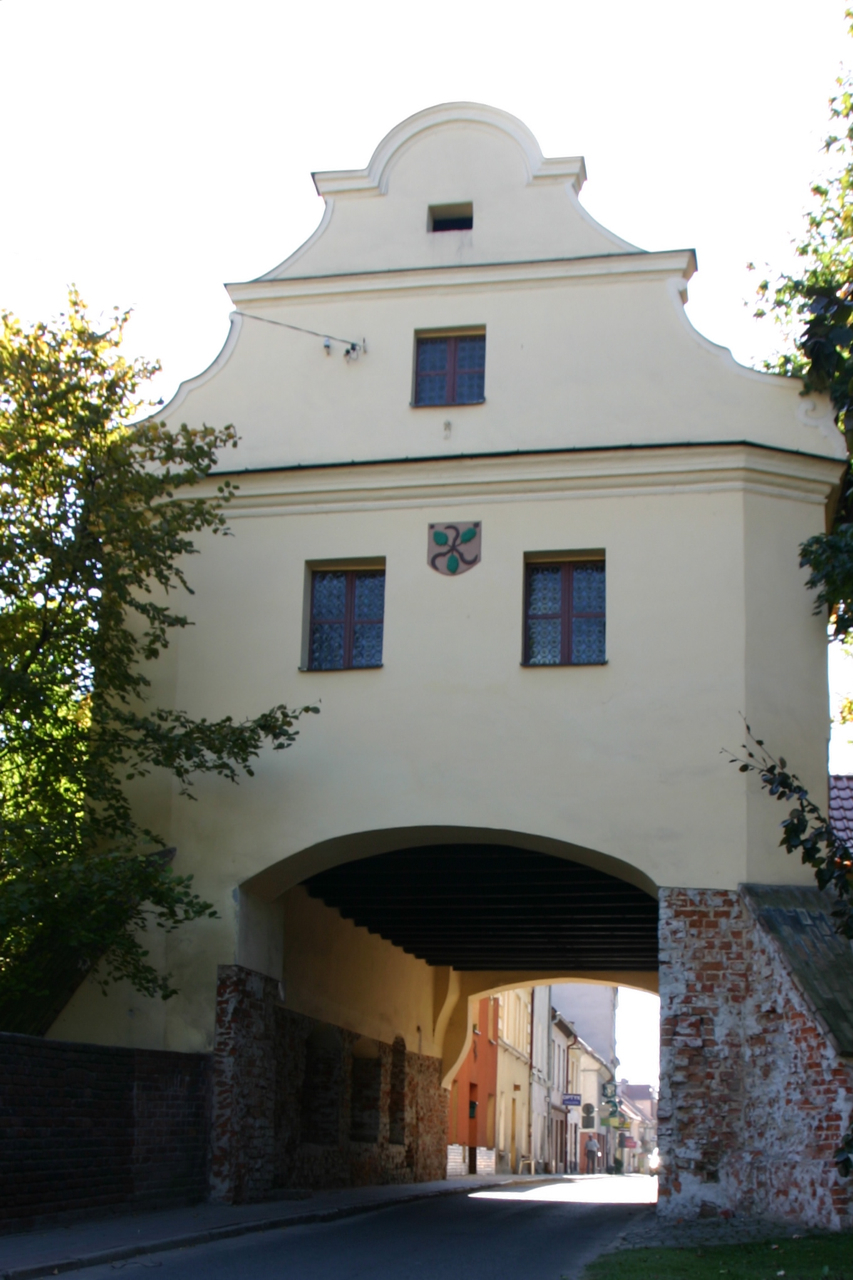
Castle gate

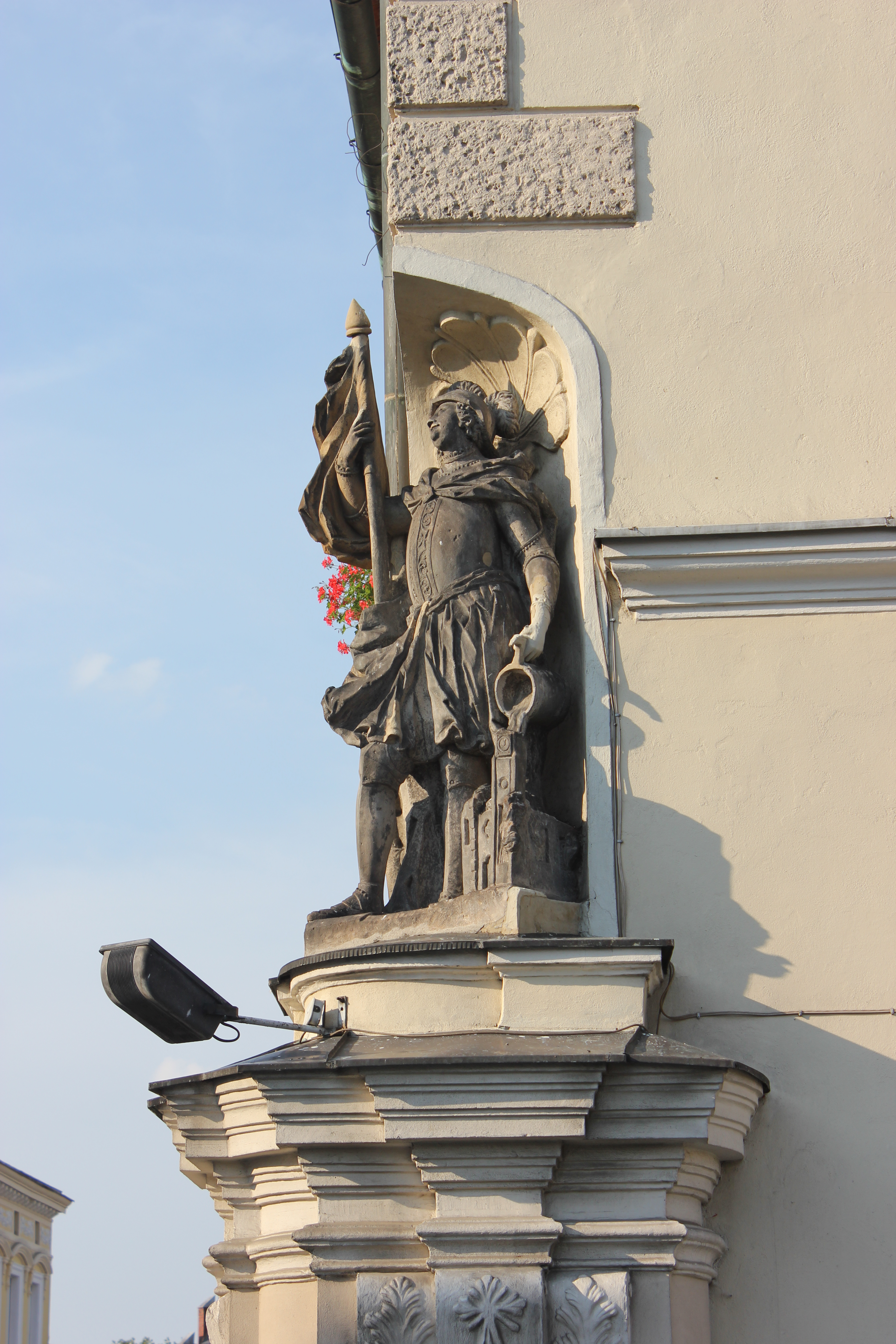
Statue of Saint Florian, patron of Poland, at the Town Hall

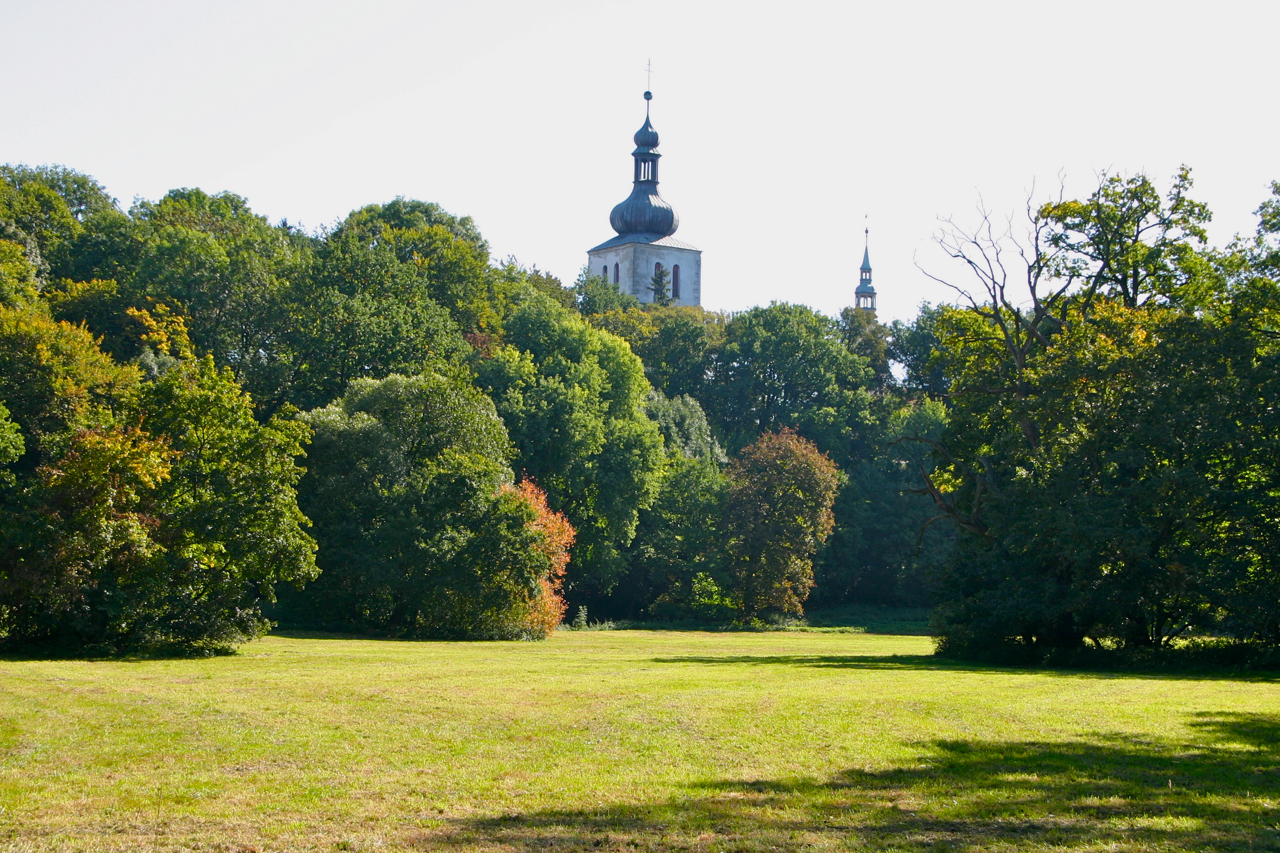
Park

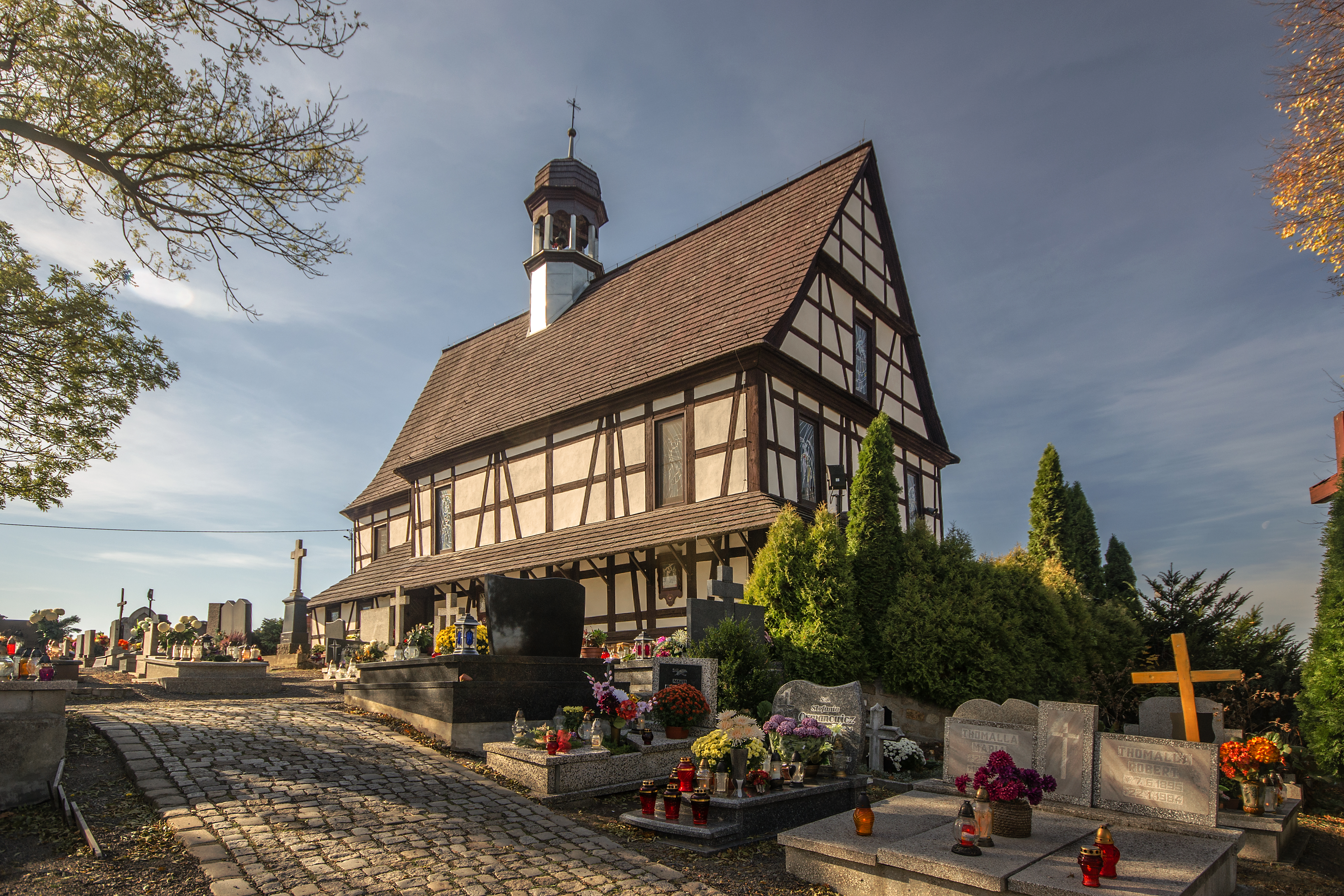
Holy Cross Church and cemetery

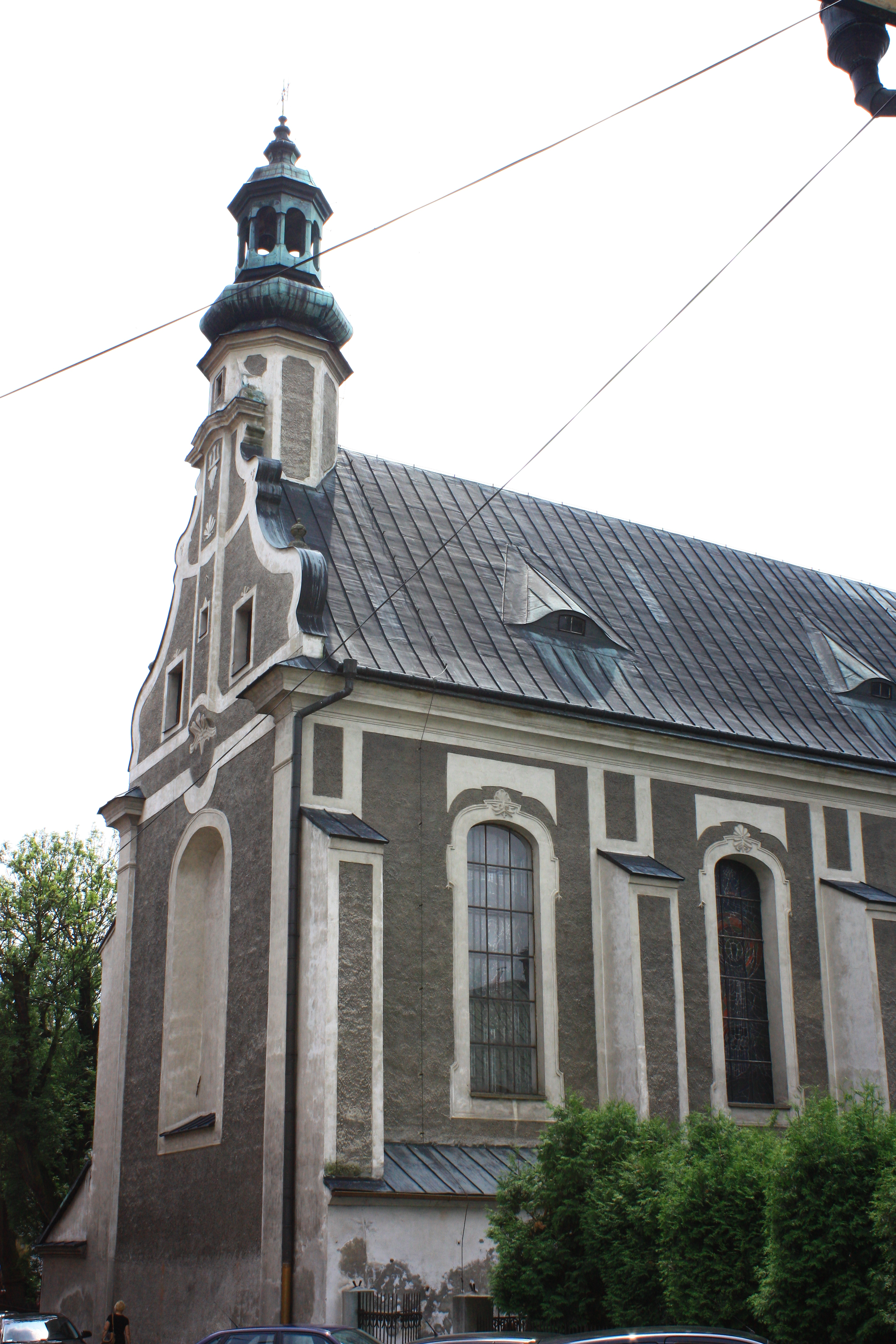
Franciscan monastery

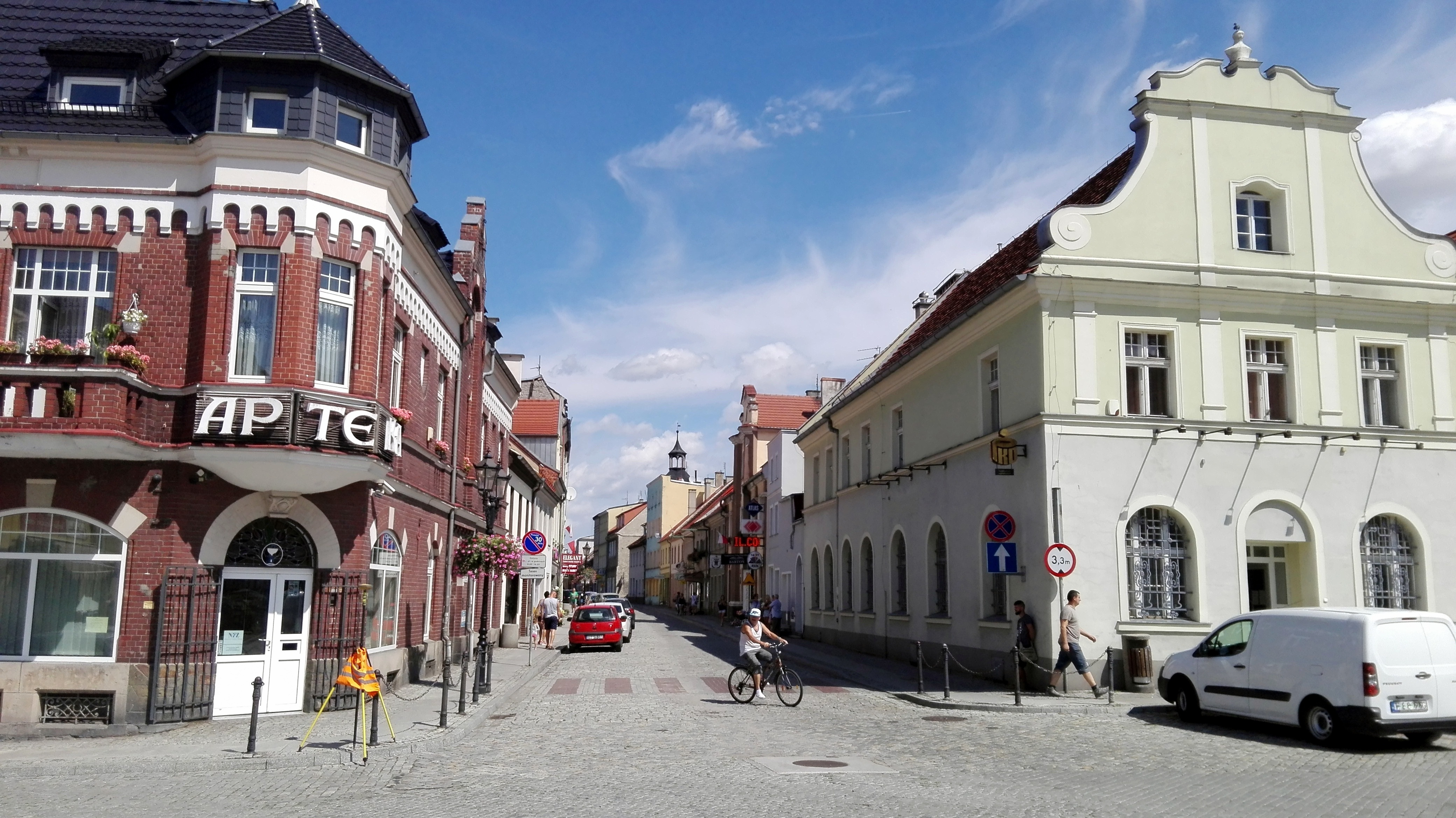
Zamkowa Street

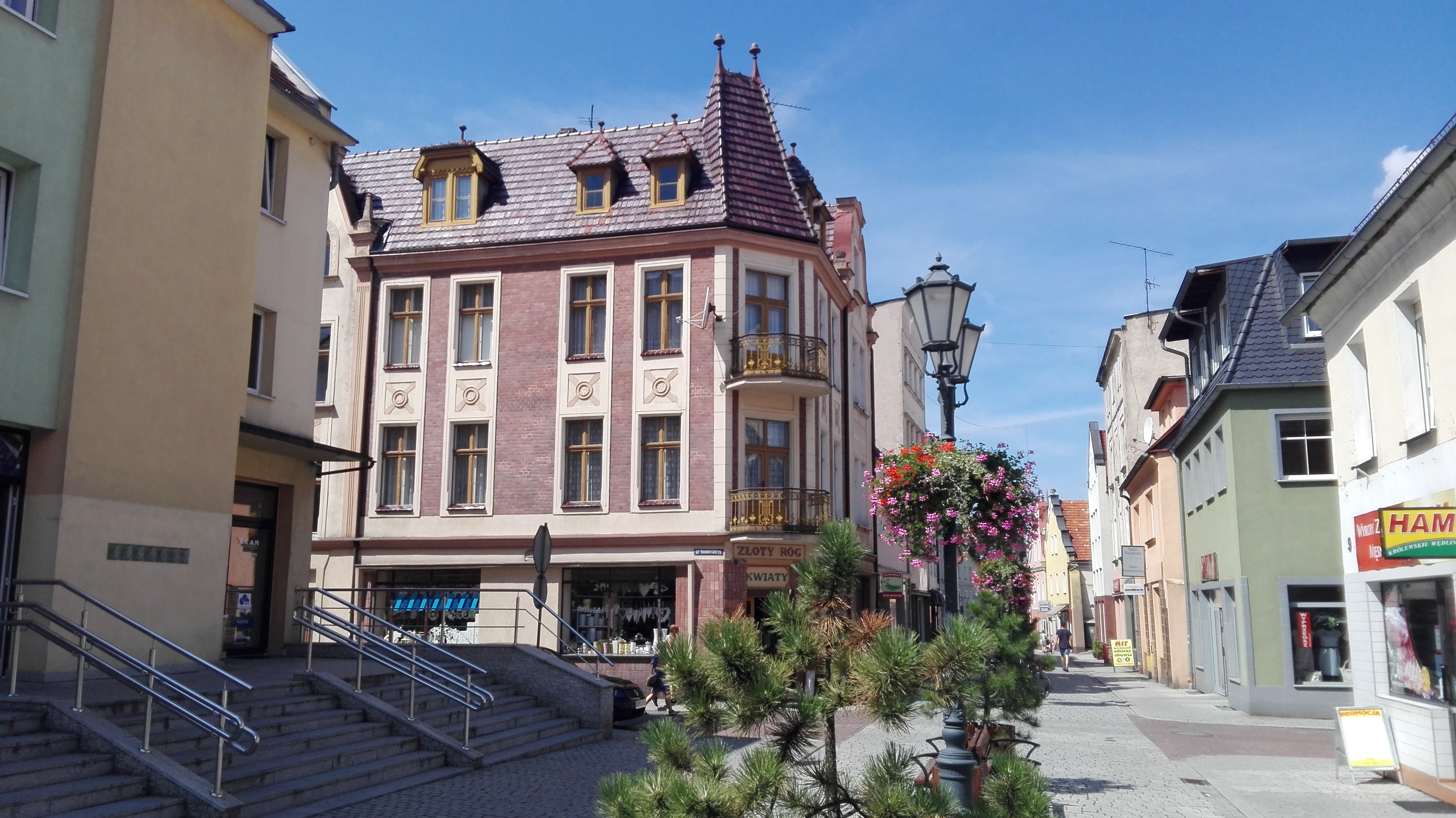
Adama Mickiewicza Street

== Sports ==
The local football team is Fortuna Głogówek. It competes in the lower leagues.

== Notable people ==
=== Natives ===
- House of the Von Oppersdorf(f), a Silesian nobile house
  - Franz Graf von Oppersdorff (1778–1818), a great lover of music, patron of Beethoven
  - Eduard Maria Graf von Oppersdorff, Freiherr von Aich und Friedstein (1800–1889)
  - Hans Georg Graf von Oppersdorff (1866–1948)
- Johann (Giovanni) Stanetti (1663–1726), Austrian sculptor
- Johann Sedlatzek (1789–1866), Austrian flutist
- Wilhelm Fraenkel (1844–1916), Austrian Jewish architect and master public servant for urban development (German: Stadtbaumeister) of Vienna
- Karl Zuschneid (1856–1926), German musicologist and director of the Mannheim Academy of Music
- Gerhard Strecke (1880–1968), German composer and actor
- Albert Willimsky (1890–1940), German Catholic priest, anti-Nazi activist and martyr
- Walter Ofiera, (1911–1995), German actor
- Joachim Georg Görlach (1931–2009), German composer, conductor and journalist
- Siegfried Tann (b. 1942), German politician of the CDU
- Lukas Klemenz (b. 1995), Polish football player

=== Other residents ===
- Ludwig van Beethoven (1770–1827), German composer and pianist
- The grandfather of American actress Uma Thurman, Friedrich Karl Johannes von Schlebrügge, was born on 21 November 1886 in Oberglogau and emigrated in the 1930s to Sweden.
- The great-grandmother of the United States' Democratic Party's 2004 presidential candidate John Kerry, Mathilde Fränkel, was born on 14 August 1845 in Oberglogau.

== Twin towns – sister cities ==
See twin towns of Gmina Głogówek.
