= Głogówek Town Hall =

Coordinates: 50.3535°N 17.8611°E

Ratusz w Głogówku (Głogówek Town Hall)
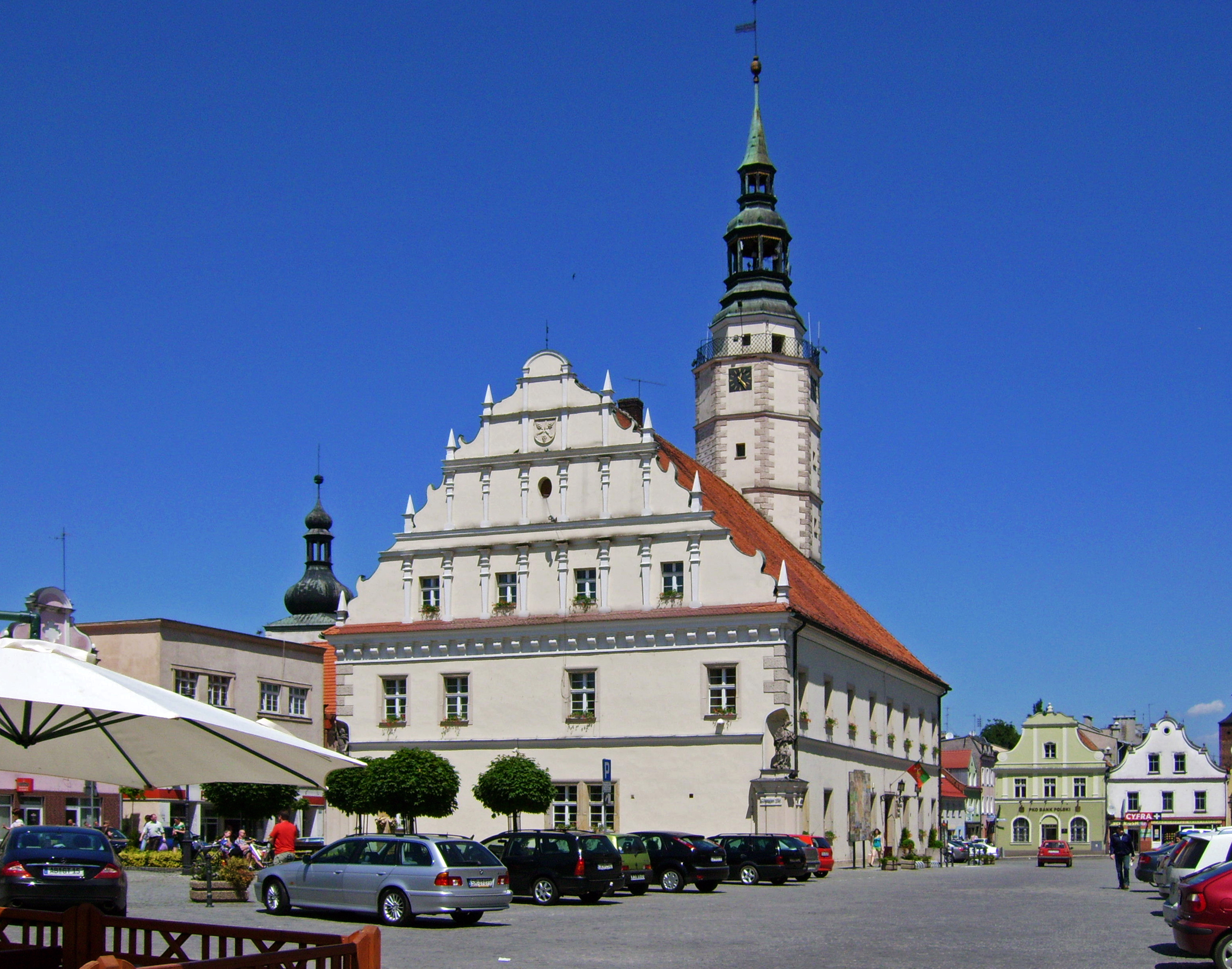
- Głogówek Town Hall
- Interactive map of the Ratusz w Głogówku (Głogówek Town Hall) area

General information
- Type: Town hall
- Architectural style: Renaissance
- Location: Byczyna, Poland
- Completed: 1608

Głogówek Town Hall - a Renaissance building built in 1608, and in the subsequent years frequently renovated and reconstructed. In 1945, the building was partially burnt down, and later rebuilt between 1955 and 1957. Currently, the town hall is the seat for the Głogówek City Council.

== History ==
The first town hall in Głogówek existed since the middle half of the fourteenth century, the building was used for commerce. In exactly the same location, in 1608, a new building to house the local authorities was built. In the years 1659-1660 the building was renovated after being plundered by Swedes. In 1774, the town hall was decorated with wall paintings and molding, and in 1890 the building was renovated in the spirit of Historicism, with which the interior was also modernised. During World War II, the building was partially burnt down, and subsequently rebuilt between 1955 and 1957.
