= Johann Sedlatzek =

Silesian flautist (1789–1866)

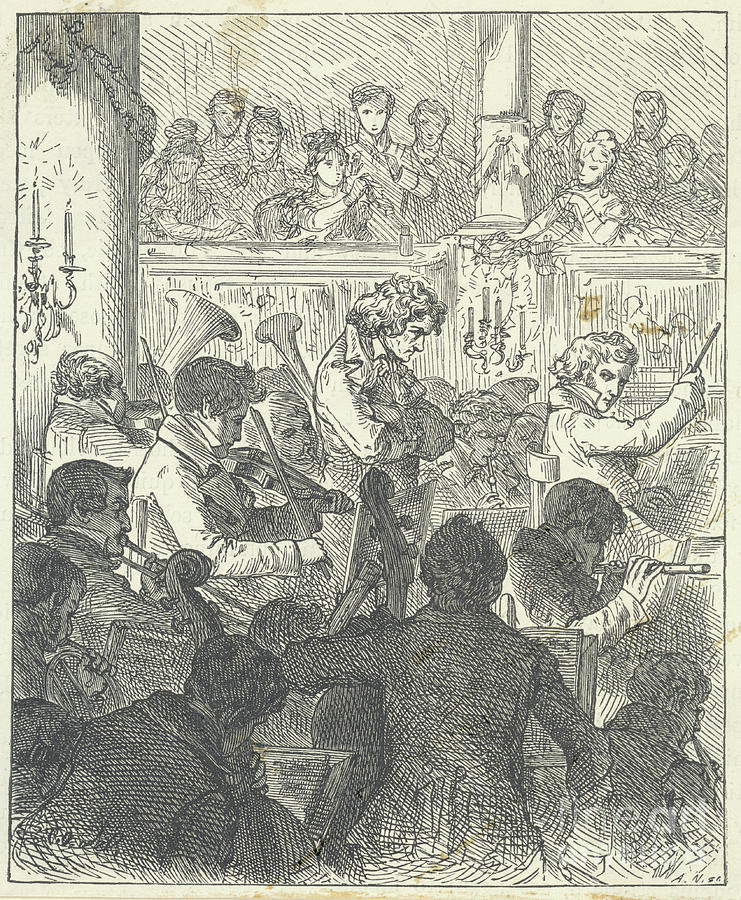
1879 lithograph depicting the premiere of the Ninth Symphony in Vienna. Beethoven stands in the center of the orchestra behind the conductor. Sedlatzek is the principal Flautist.

Johann Jean Sedlatzek (also Johann John Sedlaczek; 6 December 1789 – 11 April 1866) was a Silesian flautist born in Głogówek (Oberglogau), Kingdom of Prussia, into a family of tailors, often referred to as "The Niccolò Paganini of Flute".

After beginning his career in the family trade as an apprentice to parents Johanna and Josephy, Sedlatzek taught himself to play flute and eventually toured throughout Europe as an admired master of the instrument, playing on a unique thirteen-key Viennese flute.

Sedlatzek served in the Royal Court Orchestra of Count Franz von Oppersdorff of Oberglogau and as Royal Chamber Virtuoso to Prince Paul III Anton Esterházy of Austria. He also gave several successful concert tours through Germany, Switzerland, Italy, France, and England as featured performer.

During his tour of Italy, Sedlatzek not only survived the Palermo earthquake of 1823 (which canceled his second performance in Sicily), he also performed for the King of Prussia, Frederick William III of the Order of the Black Eagle, in Verona, for Pope Pius VII in Rome, and played alongside violin virtuoso Niccolò Paganini in Genoa. His Paris tour of 1826 included performances with the Italian Soprano Giuditta Pasta, with whom he would perform again, along with other prominent musicians, after his move to London.

Johann Sedlatzek was a friend and collaborator to Ludwig van Beethoven and played several times with the universally known composer; most notably as the principal flautist in the world-premier of Beethoven's Symphony No. 9 in Vienna's Kärntnertortheater in 1824 under the direction of Beethoven himself.

== Early life and career ==
While working as a tailor's apprentice to his father, Johann, and playing flute on the side, Johann Sedlatzek came to the attention of Count Franz von Oppersdorff, a nobleman of OberGlogau known for his intense love of music. Oppersdorff valued music so highly, in fact, that he would not hire any help who could not play a musical instrument.

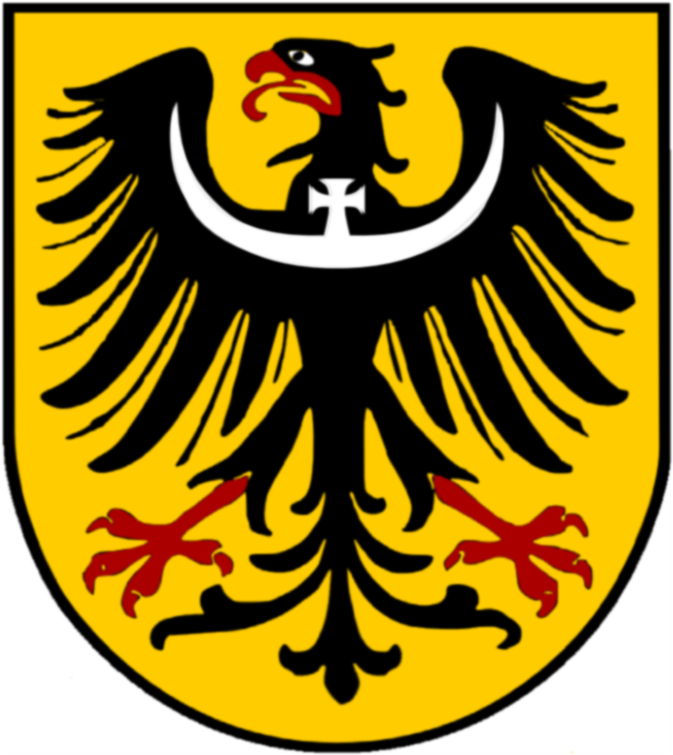
The Silesian Coat of Arms: A Black Bird with a Cross at its center, a symbol of Johann Sedlatzek's birthplace.

The young tailor and budding flautist suited von Oppersdorff's requirements and soon was invited to study music formally with the musicians of the Royal Court of OberGlogau. By September 1806, the sixteen-year-old Sedlatzek had become a full member of the Royal Court Orchestra of Count Oppersdorff, affording Johann the opportunity to play for Ludwig van Beethoven during his visit to the Count's Castle that year with the orchestra's performance of Beethoven's own 2nd Symphony.

In March 1810, Sedlatzek left his family home to pursue his musical aspirations in Opava, the cultural heart of Silesia at the time, earning his living as Master Tailor while also working as a doorman at the local theater. He then traveled to Brno, Moravia and later to Vienna, Austria repeating this occupational strategy in each new city.

Johann Sedlatzek was finally able to put aside the family trade and focus on music exclusively when he was hired as first flute to the "Theater an der Wien" in September 1812.

A joint concert with the well-established Viennese musician Raphael Dressler in 1816 at Karntnertortheater, where Dressler was principal flautist, brought Johann to wider attention. The first printed review of a Sedlatzek performance appeared shortly after this event when the "Allgemeine musikalische Zeitung" gave the first of many positive reviews that would follow him throughout his long career in music.

Sedlatzek joined the Vienna Society of Musicians (Tonkünstler-Societät) in 1817. That same year, after Dressler moved to London, Sedlatzek was chosen to replace the eminent performer as principal flautist at the Karntnertortheater, a position he would hold for the next eight years while also performing concerts in Germany, conducting a lengthy tour of Italy, and playing around Vienna with his own ensemble, the "Sedlatzek Harmonie Quintet". German author of "Faust" and other notable works, Johann Wolfgang von Goethe (1749-1832), mentions in his diaries hearing Johann Sedlaczek perform on more than one occasion in Austria during this period.

Sedlatzek's early years in Vienna culminated in the premier of Beethoven's 9th Symphony on 7 May 1824 at Karntnertortheater, where Sedlatzek served as principal flautist. Certain passages of Beethoven's score required the use of the particular Viennese flute which Sedlatzek was known to play with exceptional virtuosity. Only the Viennese flute was capable of playing as low as G, which was required for the proper interpretation of Beethoven's symphony.

Other notable musicians who performed in the Vienna premier of Beethoven's Ninth Symphony in 1824 included soprano Henriette Sontag, contralto Caroline Unger, tenor Anton Haizinger, and pianist Conradin Kreutzer. Among the violinists performing that evening were Joseph Bohm, Leopold Jansa, and Joseph Mayseder. In the wind section, playing along with Sedlatzek, were Karl Scholl, Joseph Friedlowsky, Wenzell Sedlak, Thobold Hurth, and Edward Levy. Beethoven, too hard of hearing at this point in his life to conduct, directed the presentation while Ignaz Schuppanzigh led the orchestra and Michael Umlauf conducted the whole.

== Tours of Austria, Germany, Swtitzerland, and Italy ==
Between the years after his appointment as Principal Flautist at Karntentor Theater in 1817, and his performance with Beethoven in the premier of the 9th Symphony in 1824, Sedlatzek managed a busy schedule which included tours through Austria, Germany, Switzerland, and Italy, while also performing (by private subscription) in Vienna with his Harmonie Quintet.

After his March 1818 performance with Carl Czerny in Vienna, Sedlatzek embarked on his first European tour as a featured performer. The first stop was in Zurich, where he performed with the pianist Johann Peter Pixiusem, prompting the "Allgemeine Musikalische Zeitung" to write about the flautist "with great delight". In the summer of 1820, Sedlatzek performed in Prague. The Wiener Allgemeine Theaterzeitung wrote of this performance: "Sedlatzek captivated the audience with his variations on 'God Save the King' and captured the hearts of all!"

Sedlatzek gave two shows in Berlin in July 1821. The first was to accompany Carl Maria von Weber. The second was as the featured player.

Back in Vienna, 1 August 1821, Sedlatzek performed with cellist Vincez Schuster and pianist Karl Maria von Bocklet. Sedlatzek and Schuster performed together portions of "Schone Minke, op. 78". And, as a bonus, at the end of the show, Johann Sedlatzek performed publicly, for the first time, on the newly invented Viennese Flute with which he would become synonymous during his later career.

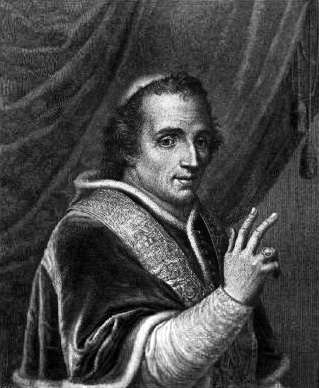
Pope Pius VII for whom Sedlatzek performed in Rome during his tour of Italy in 1823.

In 1822, Sedlatzek embarked on a two-year tour of Italy, which began with his performances to the Congress of Verona (where he performed for the Prussian King, Frederick William III), and continued through Sicily, Parma, Milan, Naples, and Genoa, where he performed alongside Niccolò Paganini. The Gizetta di Miliano said Sedlatzek "captured his audience", and also noted that "even with Paganini performing in town, Sedlatzek's Halls were "bursting at the seams".

In a letter to his parents, Johann wrote of his Italian tour and his stay in Sicily:

"Once again, as in every city, I have been enthusiastically received. I have meals each day with General Field Marshal, Graf von Wallmoden, and in the evening, I go to parties. My first show was a good one, but the second was unfortunately prevented by the terrible earthquake ."

The Palermo earthquake of 5 March 1823 was the worst earthquake in the area of Sicily in the 19th century and one of the worst in Italy's history since such records have been kept.

Sedlatzek left Sicily after the earthquake and traveled to Rome, where he performed for The Pope of the Roman Catholic Church at that time, Pope Pius VII.

== Sedlaczek and Ludlam's Cave ==
Johann Sedlaczek is also listed as a member of the "Ludlamshohle" during the years between 1817 and 1826. "Ludlamshohle" (translated as "Ludlam's Cave" or "Ludlam's Hell") was a secret-society of intellectuals, a select group of actors, singers, musicians, and scholars of Vienna, including Johann's contemporaries Karl Maria von Weber, Karl Gottfried, Friedrich Ziegler and some sources say Franz Schubert.

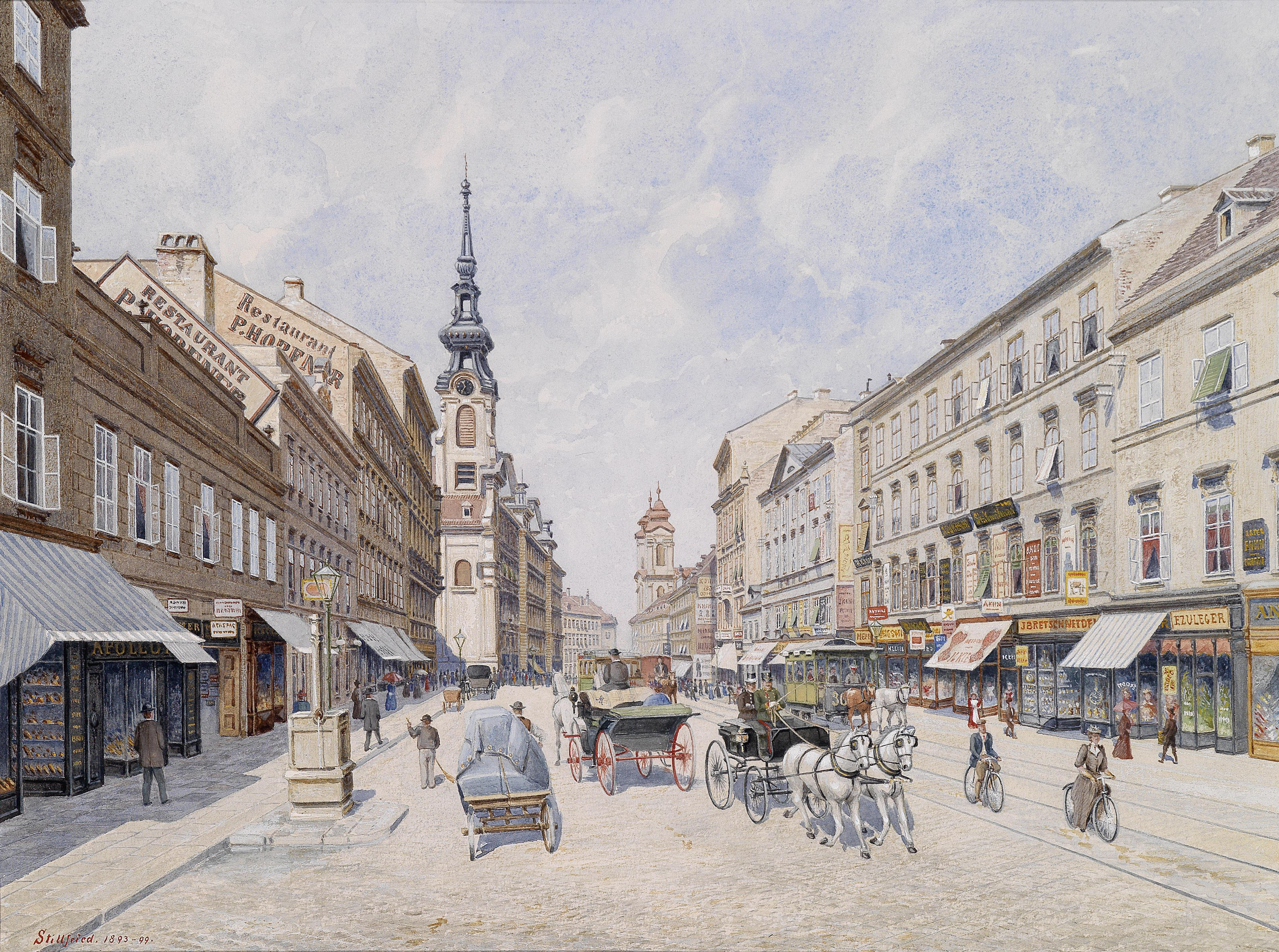
19th-Century Vienna, where Johann Sedlatzek spent much of his musical career.

The club was named after the Drama "Ludlam's Cave" by Danish poet Adam Oehlenschläger (14 November 1779 – 20 January 1850) and was also a reference to the dark, cave-like rooms in which the group typically met. Ludlamshohle was founded by the Austrian poet and dramatist, Ignaz Franz Castelli (6 March 1781 in – 5 February 1862), house poet of Kartnertortheater from 1811 to 1814.

While the society is consistently referred to as "secret", it was, in fact, well known to the public due to its large membership of prominent artists, even being written of in Vienna papers. Members claimed there was no devious or political intent to their meetings. Reports of attendees suggest the meetings were more akin to rowdy fraternity parties than dark rituals of sacred meaning or political intrigue. Nonetheless, the group's esoteric activities, strange symbolism, red and black color preference, and coded communications drew the suspicions of local authorities.

A police raid was conducted during a meeting of Ludlamshohle held on 19 April 1826, founded on a charge no more specific than "sedition" in which manuscripts, artwork and money were confiscated, while many members were arrested. This action was largely ridiculed by the public as no evidence of espionage was ever uncovered in the subsequent trials.

The group publicly dissolved after the raid, however, later writings indicate that certain members continued to meet secretly.

Sedlaczek himself was most likely never charged or under suspicion of any political subversion as this would have prevented his many travels. Austrians at that time were not allowed to travel outside of the country without special permission from the government. Travel for the sake of curiosity was not acceptable. "Need" had to be established. In the case of musicians, character and talent had to be proven. Johann traveled frequently, both during and after his involvement with "Ludlamshohle" indicating he was consistently in good standing with the Viennese authorities.

== Farewell to Vienna and a tour of Paris ==
On 3 April 1825, Sedlatzek gave a farewell concert in Vienna at which he performed works from Beethoven and Rossini as well as his own compositions "Capriccio for Flute" and "Neue Variations for Flute", with the well-known Ignaz Schuppanzigh conducting.

While Sedlatzek's farewell concert was held in April 1825, an entry in the Journal of the conductor Sir George Thomas Smart dated 11 September 1825 in which he describes a visit to Beethoven's home, shows that Sedlatzek remained in Vienna through the end of that year:

"... most of the company departed (after the performance), but Schlesinger invited me to stop and dine with the following party of ten. Beethoven, his nephew (Karl), Holz, Weiss, C. Czerny, who sat at the bottom of the table, Lincke, Jean Sedlatzek- a flute player who is coming to England next year and has letters from the Duke of Devonshire, Count St. Antonio, etc.- he has been to Italy- Schlesinger, Schuppanzigh, who sat at the top, and myself."

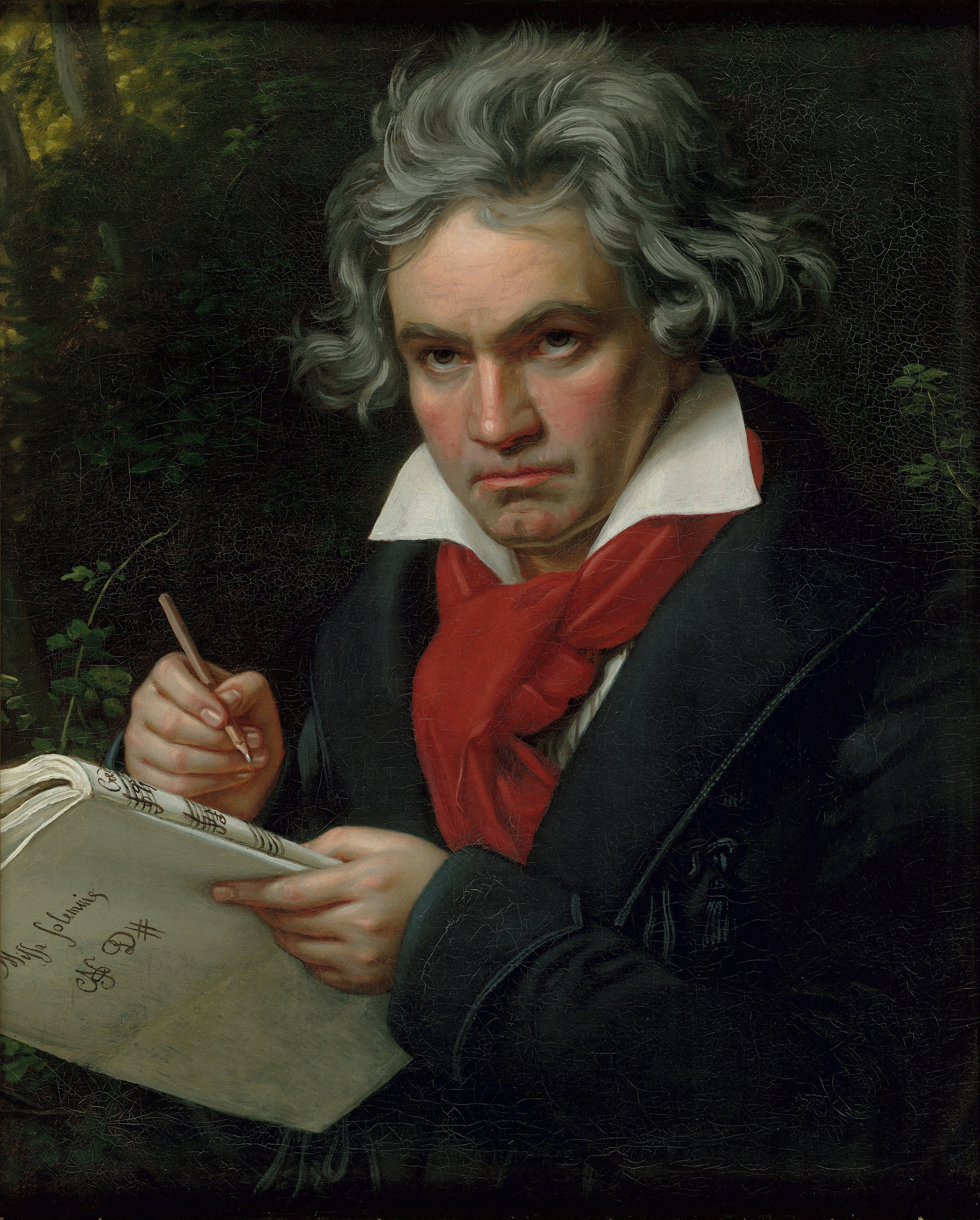
Beethoven, to whom Johann Sedlatzek was a friend and collaborator.

Afterwards, Sedlatzek visited his parents in OberGlogau and his sister, Josephina Maise, in Warmbrunn before embarking on a concert tour of Paris in 1826, with the following personal letters of recommendation from Ludwig van Beethoven in hand:

To Monsieur Kreutzer,

Sir! This is with hope that you favor your old friend, I dare to recommend to you the bearer of this letter, Monsieur Sedlatzek, a most distinguished Artist, and am begging you not to refuse him ... I take this time to testify my friendship and perpetual consideration. Sir!
Your very humble servant, L v. B

To Monsieur Cherubini,

Sir! The bearer of this letter, Monsieur Sedlatzek, ardently desires to pay you his tribute. I am convinced of his esteem as an Artist worthy of my name, and hope for a favorable welcome from you. Accept him with the highest assurance and the same consideration with which I have been honored. Sir!
Your very humble servant, L v. B

After the Paris tour, Sedlatzek moved to London.

== London and family ==
Thirty-six-year-old Johann Sedlatzek arrived in London in the summer of 1826. By the spring of 1827, his British audience had grown beyond his expectation, as the following announcement in the May 12, 1827, edition of the "London Literary Gazette" attests:

"Under the patronage of His Royal Highness the Duke of Sussex, their Highnesses the Prince and Princess Esterhazy, and the Duke and Duchess of Leister, Mr. SEDLATZEK, (of Vienna, Performer of the newly invented German flute), finding that the Number of Tickets in demand for his concert on the 18th of May far exceeds his expectation, respectfully announces that he has been obliged to remove it from Queen Square, to Willis's Rooms, and that tickets can be had at the Bar of the Thatched Roof Tavern; Willis's Rooms, and of Mr. Sedlatzek, No. 37, Castle Street East, Oxford Street."

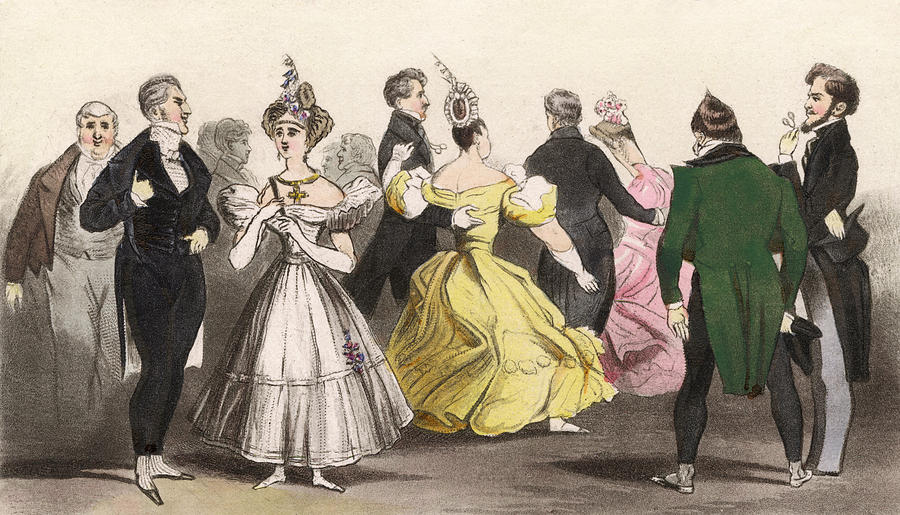
Illustration of a ball held at Willis's Rooms (formerly Almack's) on King Street in London circa 1825, where Johann Sedlatzek performed many times between 1826 and 1842

A survey of English Newspapers from 1826 to 1842 shows Sedlatzek was very active in the London music scene at that time. His performances were reviewed frequently in London papers, such as The Musical World, The London Gazette, The Harmonicon, and the Court Journal, to name a few, with commentary ranging from reverent: "We are much indebted to J. Sedlatzek for his arrangement of the music of this great violinist (Josef Mayseder), executed with taste and skill." to rapturous: "These compositions are superb specimens of modern magnificence ... listened to by a very full audience with the united sensations of rapture and admiration."

A review of a concert held 8 July 1838 shows how performances by Johann Sedlatzek were generally received:

"Mr. Sedlatzek, The eminent flautist, gave a "Soirie Musicale" in the smaller room at the Anthenmeum. The room was quite filled by a very select and fashionable company and, the concert conducted by Mr. J. A. Pickering, was of the highest order.
The first piece was remarkable for the beautiful manner in which the instruments harmonized. Mr. Sedlatzek has this advantage over every other flute player of the present day: his tone is the nearest approach to the human voice we ever heard. He has, moreover, a facility and neatness of execution which must stamp him as a performer of the highest order. Personally acquainted with several of the deceased great German Masters, his style has been drawn from the purest sources. And it follows that, apart from the merely mechanical operation of playing, he is a first-rate musician."

Sedlatzek spent sixteen active years in London where he frequently played to crowded halls and performed with renowned musicians including Johann Strauss, Signor Brizzi Nicolas Mori, Felix Mendelssohn, double-bass master Domenico Dragonetti, and guitar virtuoso Trinidad Huerta. He would also meet again with the notorious Paganini in 1831 when London hosted a bevy of foreign performers for the season. In the midst of his busy performance schedule, Johann Sedlatzek earned an Honorary Degree in 1835 from Green College in London where he was an instructor.

Sedlatzek was also married in London on All-Hallows Eve, 31 October 1827 to Ann Ward, and, in the years following, fathered at least five children. The first of these births was announced in the August 9, 1828, edition of the "London Literary Gazette" :

At the request of our good friend M. Sedlatzek who plays the German flute better than he writes the English Language, we insert the following interesting announcement:

"Dear Sir! I am sorry not having the pleasure to find you at home. I was come to thank you for your kind report on my Conzert. [sic.] And in the same time to tell you that my wife is delivering with a baby Girl, and that the Prinzesses [sic.] Esterhazy will be the Good Mutters (God Mothers- ed.)- should you find convenient to mention in your next weeks Journal- Sedlatzek"

His children: Therese, Nina, Paul, Georg, and Marie each achieved their own musical successes. Nina and Therese performed as pianists in Vienna. Paul followed his Father's inclination, becoming a flautist. Marie became an opera singer and actress for the Theatre Royal, Drury Lane and toured London with her father in 1854. Georg performed as solo cellist for Eduard Strauss and Johann Strauss II. Georg's son, Ludwig Maria Sedlaczek (3 January 1875 – 14 October 1965), extended the line of musicians begun in the 19th century into the 20th, as he performed and conducted throughout Austria and Germany in the early 1900s, and then, after moving to America in 1927, served as professor of Music at University of Louisville, Kentucky, USA.

Johann returned to Vienna in 1842 after the death of his wife.

== Father and daughter tour London, 1854 ==
Johann Sedlatzek encouraged his children in music from an early age. The August 1840 issue of The Musical World reviewed a June concert of that year at which:

"... the Misses Sedlatzek ( the eldest of whom is not yet 12 years of age), played several pieces on the pianoforte in excellent style. They have been grounded in music by their father, and also tutored by Pio Cianchetti, and the style of Clementi and Dussek might be easily traced in their performances."

While all of Sedlatzek's children found careers as musicians in the following decades, his daughter, Marie, was most often referenced in the London journals in the latter half of the 19th century. The Musical World records that a farewell concert was given in the Netherlands, where she had been touring extensively as a featured performer in previous months, on 18 February 1854 in Amsterdam at the Salle du Parc., which was "highly successful."

"Sedlatzek sang ... and was recalled at the end of each movement to receive the applause of the audience. This young vocalist, although she has scarcely reached her 20th year, has attained great excellence."

After her farewell performance in Amsterdam, she met her father in England in March 1854 for the start of their London tour together.

"Fraulein Sedlatzek, Principal Vocalist and Herr Sedlatzek, Principal Flautist to His Highness the Prince Esterházy, beg to announce their arrival in London for the season. All communications with regard to lessons and engagements for concerts and private parties to be addressed to them at their residence, 42, Manchester Street, Manchester." (The Musical World Saturday March 11, 1854.)

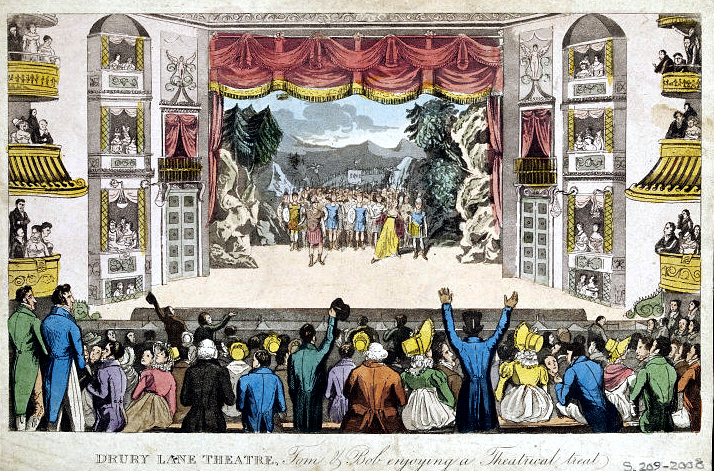
Theatre Royal, Drury Lane where Johann's daughter, Marie Sedlatzek began her career in opera in 1854.

The Saturday March 18 edition of The Musical World included the item in their news section, saying: "M. Sedlatzek, the well-known flautist and composer has arrived in London with his daughter, who is reported to possess considerable talent as a vocalist. Fraulein Sedlatzek has been very favorably received in Vienna and Amsterdam."

Marie Sedlatzek soon became a performer of the Theatre Royal, Drury Lane where reviews, at first, were mixed. One reviewer in the May 1854 issue of The Musical World said, "Mdlle. Sedlatzek acted well as Marcellina, (in a production of Beethoven's "Fidelio" ) but had scarcely voice enough for the part." However, a review from a month earlier in the April 29 edition of the same journal said of Marie (in a production of Weber's Freitschutz, starring Madame Caradori):

"Sedlatzek was recalled at the end with great enthusiasm ... (advancing) a step in public favor by the manner in which she sung the charming music of Annsehen and by the pretty and lively earnestness of her acting. She is young and inexperienced, but there is purpose in all she does."

However mixed her initial reception may have been, Marie continued her career with the Royal Opera in London after her father returned to Vienna at the end of 1854. Marie eventually joined Theatre Royal, Dublin (Ireland), where she is frequently listed in the Annals of the Theatre Royal, Dublin as a performer there between 1855 and 1861.

== Later years and last days ==
Aside from the tour of London in 1854 with his daughter Marie, Sedlatzek spent the last years of his life in his chosen homeland of Vienna, teaching flute, performing infrequent concerts, and training his children in music.

Johann Sedlatzek gave his final performance in 1865 to celebrate more than 50 years as a musician at Bösendorfer Salon in Vienna. In addition to the many prominent musicians who performed and paid tribute was his son Georg, the cellist.

Johann Sedlatzek died on April 11, 1866, at the Allgemeines Krankenhaus in Vienna and was buried in Währinger Kommunalfriedhoff (now Schubert Park) alongside his contemporaries Ludwig van Beethoven and Franz Schubert.

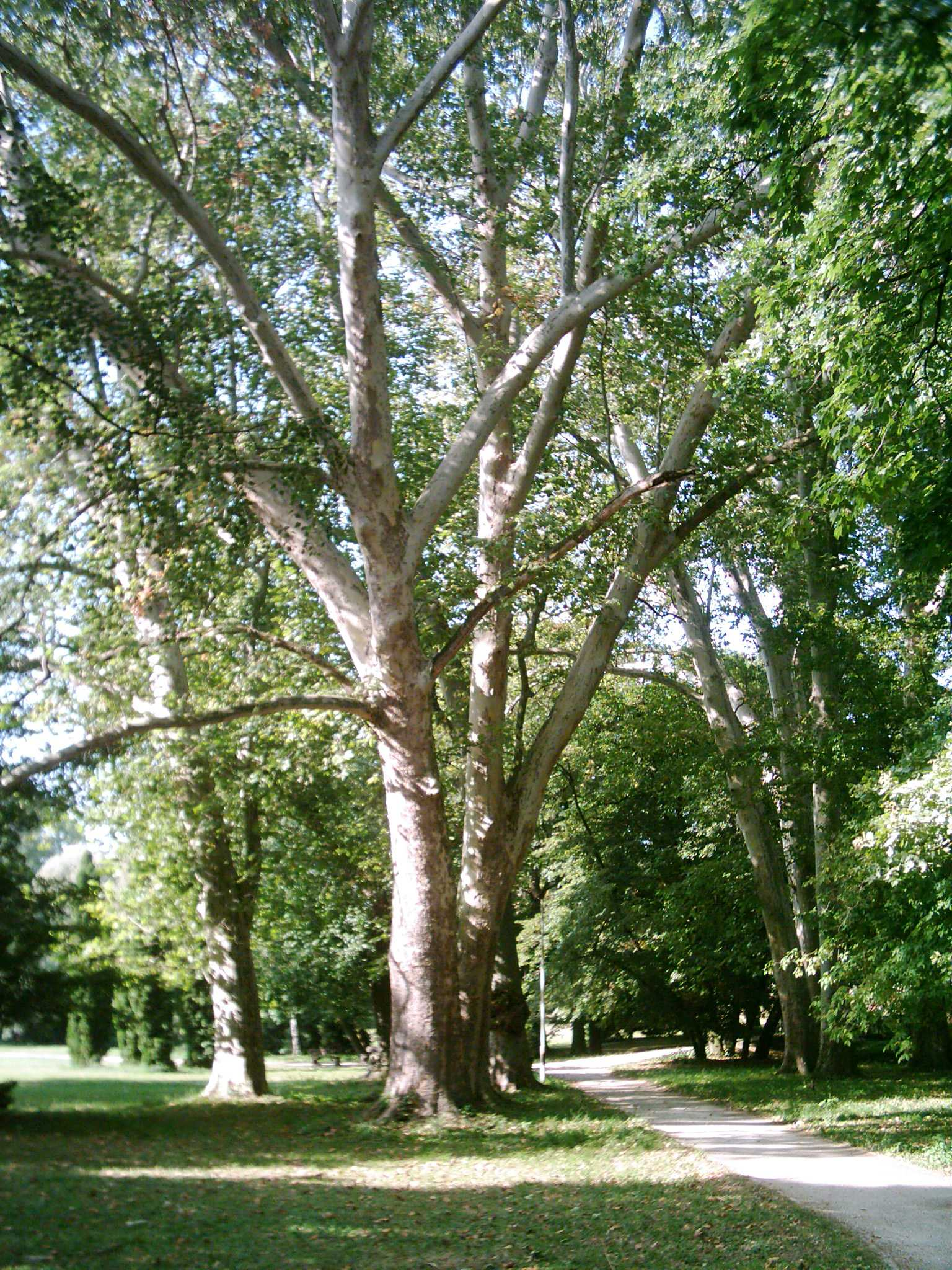
Schubert park-Zselíz-platánok. Formerly Wahring Friedhoff, The original burial place of Ludwig van Beethoven and Franz Schubert, where Johann Sedlatzek was buried in 1866.

== Sedlatzek and the Viennese flute ==
Many of the reviews of Johann Sedlatzek's performances which appeared in London journals in the nineteenth century make special mention of the specific type of flute he played, showing a strong association between the musician and his instrument. Although the English writers consistently referred to his instrument as the "German" flute, it was actually Viennese.

The "Viennese" flute was the flute of Beethoven and Schubert's Vienna, playing important roles in some of their most famous compositions. Most notably constructed in the 1800s by the companies of Stephen Koch and Johann Zeigler of Vienna between 1807 and 1895, the Viennese flute was unusually long allowing additional keys for playing notes as low as the G below middle C, corresponding to the lowest note on the violin.

To clarify, the Viennese flute was not the equivalent of the modern alto flute. This was a standard concert flute extended to provide a wider range, a fuller toned body of sound, and additional keys with fingering options not available on a shorter flute.

The Royal Military Exhibition of Musical Instruments held in London in 1890 featured a large display of flutes of all varieties, including an 1827 model by Koch which the exhibition catalog identified as "once the property of the well-known Sedlatzek." The catalog further describes the flute as being made "of ebony, with thirteen silver keys descending to the G of a violin."

In spite of the potential scale of the instrument, the low G was rarely attempted as the design created a non-responsiveness in the lower register that made its lowest note extremely difficult to sufficiently intone. This technical flaw in the Viennese flute's design yielded a popular anecdote among flute enthusiasts involving Sedlatzek that has been often repeated:

"The low G very seldom came out successfully and when it did, Sedlatzek would stand the flute up in a corner and salute it with profound obeisance!"

The Viennese flute is not the only unique instrument Sedlatzek brought to British shores. During an 1831 concert in London, he introduced English audiences to the latest German musical innovation, the Accordion:

"At the close of the show, Mr. Sedlatzek performed on a new instrument called the accordion ... which, however, has little beside its novelty to recommend it."

== Performance and composition ==
Much of the acclaim Sedlatzek received for his performances throughout his life was founded upon his speed and agility on the unusually long-scale Viennese flute, earning him the alias "the Paganini of Flute". The following commentary appeared in the "London Literary Gazette", 1827.

"Among the musical performers at present in London to whom we have listened with great pleasure ... we have to notice M. Sedlatzek of Vienna, whose execution on a newly invented German flute is of remarkable character and effect. The instrument is lengthened and has many additional keys, by means of which Mr. S. produces combinations hitherto unknown to (the Flute). His manner is rapid and his style is powerful."

However, Sedlatzek seemed not to have been dismissed as a mere technician, as he was known to be an emotional performer who valued a powerful melody over mere virtuosity. The following review of a Sedlatzek concert held for charity in August 1828 appeared in the London musical journal "The Harmonicon":

"M. Sedlatzek does not deal in those miraculous passages which astonish all and please few: He therefore has no occasion to sacrifice the tone of his flute for the sake of being able to execute on it what was never intended for the instrument, but attends more to expression and cultivates a taste of a greater, if not more imposing kind ... He pleases while others surprise ... his sounds go more to the heart than to the head ..."

Sedlatzek was also an admired composer and arranger. His most highly praised original composition was the "Souvenir du Simplon", (The London Gazette called it "delicious"). while his arrangement of "God Save the King" remained a crowd favorite throughout his career from the time of its first performance at an 1820 concert in Prague.

A recording of eight of Beethoven's ten Sonatas by French musicians Alain Marion and Denis Pascal released in France in 1999 attempted to be an authentic reproduction of the original performances of these pieces as they are based on the personal transcriptions of the original musicians who performed them with Beethoven during his lifetime, including flute transcriptions from Johann Sedlatzek.

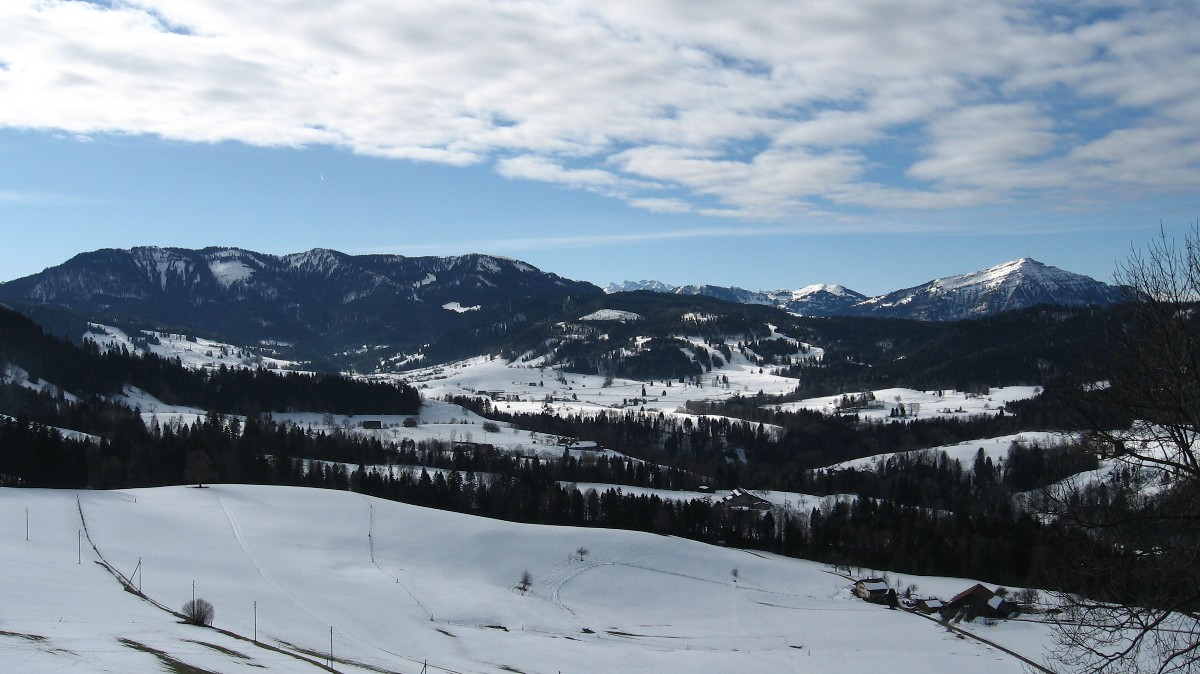
A view of Mount Rigi, the highest peak in the Swiss alps which border Austria, J. Sedlatzek's chosen home.

Manuscripts of Sedlatzek's works are currently archived in libraries around the world including the University of Melbourne at Victoria, Australia, the Moravian Library at Brno the Deutsche Nationalbibliothek, the United States Library of Congress, The British Library of St. Pancras, London, the University of California, Los Angeles, US, Yale University, US and the University of Glasgow, UK.

An original manuscript of Sedlatzek's "Souvenir du Simplon" mentioned above is currently held at the Moravian Library.

The manuscript of Sedlatzek's "La Pasta!" (a tribute to the Italian Mezzo-Soprano Giuditta Pasta composed with Reissiger), is preserved in the collection of Henry Gasset (1813–1886).

Among the works listed in the Melbourne Library catalog, as being either arranged or composed by Johann Sedlatzek, are: "Eleven airs from the operas of Rossini, Carafa, and Mercadante", "Souvenir a Paganini: variations on the Carnival of Venice", "Souvenir a Pasta et Rubini", and "Sehnsucht nach dem Rigi." (Longing for the Rigi- My Native Home ...)

German/Danish composer Friedrich Kuhlau (1786–1832) honored the influence of Sedlatzek with the dedication of his own "Premier Grand Trio Concert" for two flutes and piano, op. 119. The title page of the 1834 edition reads: "composed and dedicated to friend Jean Sedlatzek".

== Sedlatzek and Sedlaczek ==
Research reveals several variations of the renowned musician's name. Johann's first name is given interchangeably in written literature as Johann, Johanna, Jean, John, and J. References to his last name alternate between the two spellings Sedlatzek and Sedlaczek. Sedlatzek (tz) is Johann's birthname originating in Silesia. However, due to Polonization of the region during his lifetime, the Polish spelling Sedlaczek (cz) was adopted in countries controlled by or strongly influenced by Poland.

References to Johann in Vienna papers predominantly used the Polish "cz" spelling while most other areas of Europe used the "tz" spelling. Johann himself is known to have alternated between the two spellings in his own personal signature according to the culture and dialect of the country he was in at the time.

Many direct descendants of Johann Sedlatzek ultimately adopted the Polish spelling "Sedlaczek" as his son, Georg, eventually settled in Vienna, and Johann's grandson, Ludwig Sedlaczek, was born in Vienna, where the "cz" spelling was preferred.

Researching the life of Johann Sedlatzek requires searching under all of these variations.

== Polish and German biographies ==
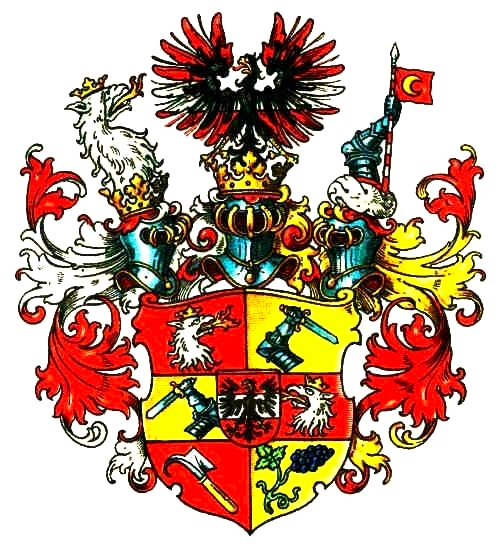
Oppersdorff Graf Wappen. The coat of arms of Count Franz von Oppersdorff of Oberglogau, Silesia who discovered Johann Sedlatzek as a young Tailor's Apprentice and hired him to perform in the Opporsdorff Royal Ortchestra, Sedlatzek's first job as a musician

Further biographical information about Johann Sedlatzek can be found in biographies currently available only in Polish and German versions. Such as:

Przycznek do biografii muzyka śląskiego Johanna Sedlatzka. Muzyka, no. 1, 1977 by Maria Zduniak.

Der oberschleisische Flotist Johann Sedlatzek (1789–1866). Music des Ostens no. 4, 1967 by Walter Kwaznik.

A more recent biographical article, "Johann Sedlatzek, the Paganini of flute from Głogówka", was posted on the Polish news website "nto.pl" on the 200th anniversary of his joining "Theater an der Wein" as Principal Flautist, his first job as a professional musician, in 1812. The article was posted on the site 12 September 2012 and featured a 20th-century photograph from a ceremony held in Oberglogau (Glogowek) in 1930 in which citizens of the town at that time posed for a re-enactment photo. Entitled "Farewell to the Apprentice", the scene depicted Johann's departure from his hometown in 1810 to pursue a career in music. An impersonator of Johann Sedlatzek, traveling bag in hand, stands at the center of the picture beside the Mayor of Oberglogau with a crowd of locals surrounding them. A hand-painted sign seen directly above the actor portraying the young tailor, reads:

'"Das Oberglogauer sendwert wunscht 1. Wandergesellen. Gute Reise!"'

("Sending Best Wishes to the First Journeyman of Oberglogau. Have a good trip!")

== Sedlatzek and the 21st century ==
The first live performance of Johann Sedlatzek's original compositions given in modern times occurred on 6 October 2012 at the 20th annual Silesian Music Festival in Poland, as reviewed in the article "Johann Sedlatzek: Master Flute, Found!" published on the Polish website Maestro.net on 9 November 2012.

The performers were flautist Elzbieta Wolenska of the Wroclaw Academy of Music, and pianist Elzbieta Zawadzka who played at the Observatory in Glogowek from newly unearthed manuscripts discovered in London archives in 2012. The performance was to commemorate the release of the first ever sound recording of Sedlatzek originals ever produced.

The flautist Wolenska had initiated her search for Sedlatzek Manuscripts after being inspired by stories told to her by the Glogowek Regional Museum Director, Alexander Devosges-Cuber, about the young tailor's apprentice from Glogowek whose advanced flute technique earned him the patronage of the Count von Oppersdorf, eventually allowing Johann to become one of the most famous flautists of the 19th century, often referred to as "The Paganini of Flute". A three-year search of archives across Europe yielded little result until, in the spring of 2012, Wolenska uncovered 300 pages worth of manuscripts in the London National Library.

Upon returning to Glogowek with the manuscripts, Wolenska and Zawadzka began recording the lost music of Sedlatzek in July 2012, including the titles "Souvenir de Simplon", "La Marie", "Souvenir a Paganini", and "Amitie". The 80 minute CD entitled "Johann Sedlatzek: Souvenir" was released in Poland in the Autumn of 2012 on JBrecords. Maestro.net called the presentation "an historic event ... and a masterful performance."

Shortly after this world-premier performance of Sedlatzek's music at the Silisian Music Festival, the city of Glogowek, Joahnn's birth home, announced a public-works project on 31 October 2012 in conjunction with the Glogowek Regional Museum to restore the memory of Johann Sedlatzek as an important figure in the town's history.

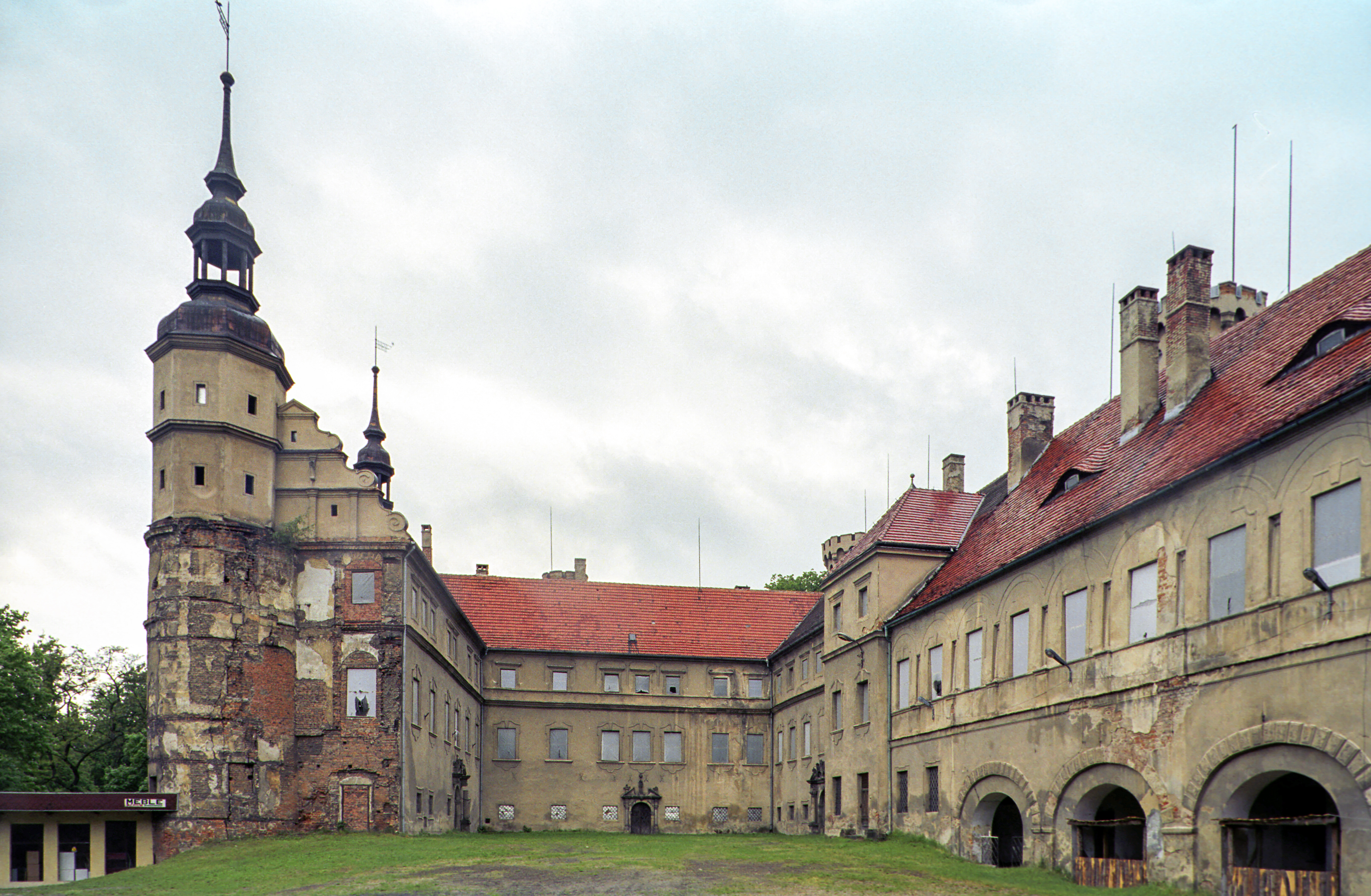
Castle Oppersdorff, Glogowek, Poland, where Johann Sedlatzek began his musical career in the Royal Court Orchestra.
