= Franz von Oppersdorff =

Silesian nobleman

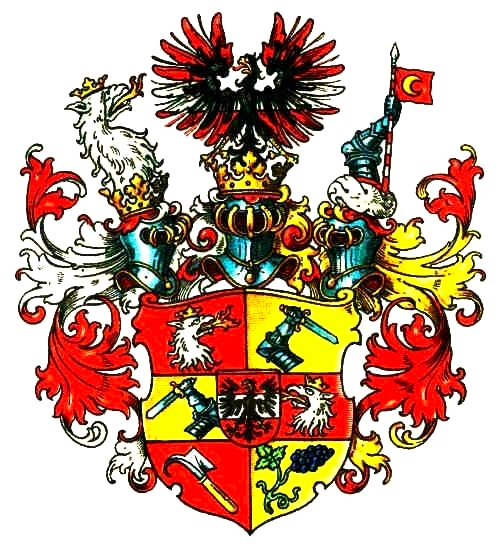
The coat of arms of Count Franz von Oppersdorff.

Count Franz von Oppersdorff (1778 - 1818) was a Silesian nobleman and a great lover of music, who commissioned Beethoven's Fourth and Fifth Symphonies.

== Biography ==
Oppersdorff's family estate was in Oberglogau, Upper Silesia, where he maintained a private orchestra. The great Beethoven patron Prince Lichnowsky lived nearby, on his estates in Hradec nad Moravicí near Opava. In the fall of 1806 - a tense year for Beethoven, marked in the spring by the withdrawal of his opera Leonore (the future Fidelio) after its obvious failure, and in the summer by his deteriorating relationship with his brother Karl, who had married in May and whose son, also called Karl, was born in September - Lichnowsky persuaded Beethoven to accompany him to Hradec nad Moravicí for some rest and peace.

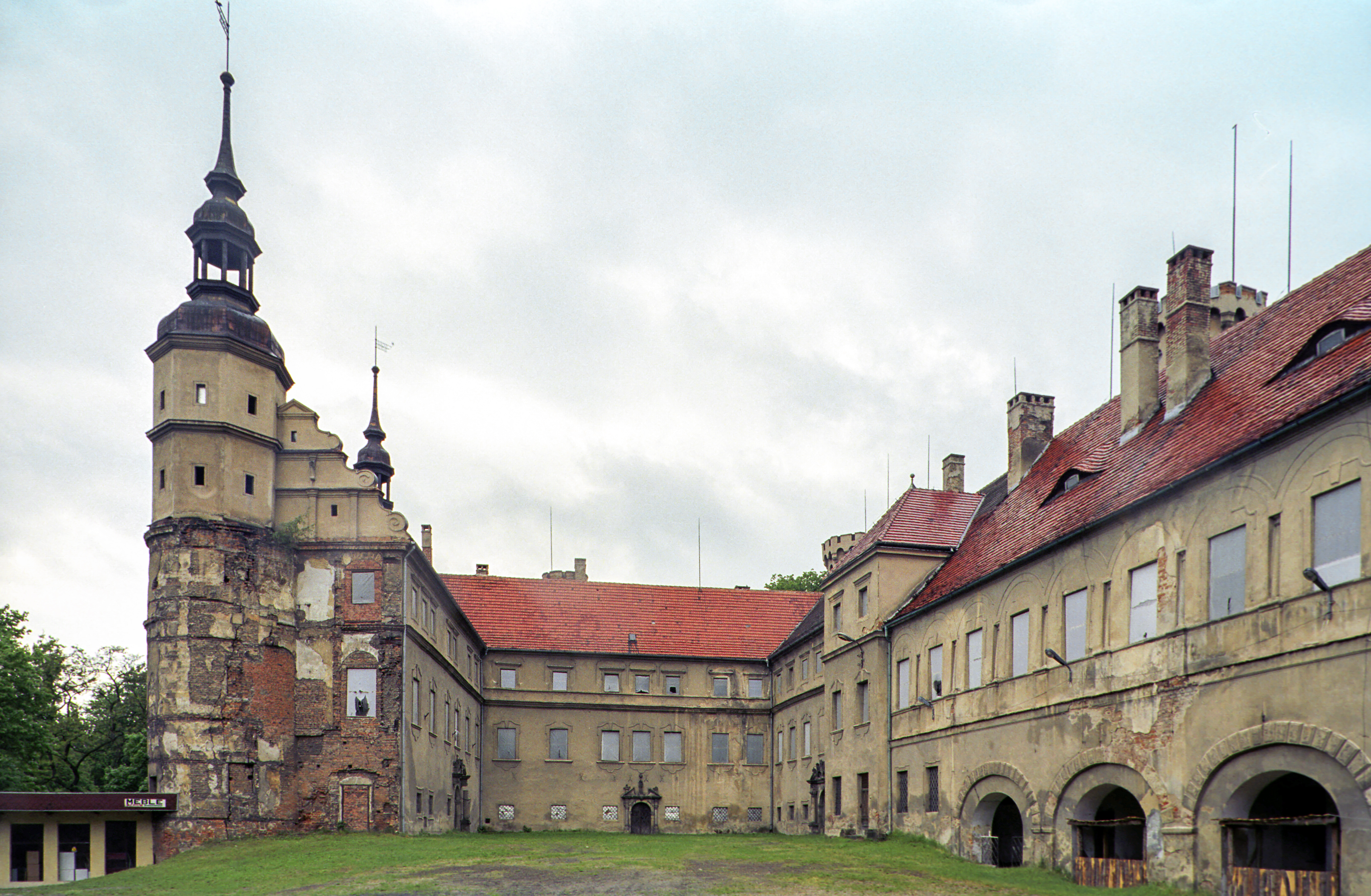
Oppersdorff Castle, originally built in the 13th century, still stands in what is now Glogowek, Poland.

That peace was interrupted, however, by a physical altercation between the prince and the composer which broke out after Beethoven refused Lichnowsky's request to perform for a group of visiting French Soldiers. (Napoleon's French army was forcefully conquering territories throughout Europe at that time, much to Beethoven's distaste, as evidenced in the late change of dedication to his Third Symphony.) According to the composer Ferdinand Ries (1784-1838), Count Oppersdorff stepped between the two quarreling men just in time to prevent Beethoven from smashing a chair over Lichnowsky's head. Beethoven departed the Lichnowsky estate and continued his stay in Silesia at the Oppersdorff estate in Oberglogau.

Upon Beethoven's arrival, the Oppersdorff orchestra performed the Second Symphony to Beethoven's approval. Oppersdorff then commissioned a new symphony from him - the Fourth - which Beethoven completed in October, selling the score for 500 guilders for Oppersdorff's private use for six months. It was published two years later with a dedication to Oppersdorff.

In February 1807 the Count paid another 500 florins for the Fourth Symphony, and in June, obviously pleased with the work, commissioned the Fifth for another 500 guilders for his own use, advancing Beethoven 200 guilders six months ahead of time. Beethoven completed the Fifth Symphony in 1808, taking the score to Oppersdorff in November to receive the final payment, but the dedication was to the Count Andrey Razumovsky and Prince Joseph Franz von Lobkowitz.

There is no record that Oppersdorff commissioned any more work from Beethoven.

Franz von Oppersdorff is also credited with launching the career of Johann Sedlatzek (1789-1866), a flautist and composer born in Oberglogau, Silesia (now Glogowek, Poland) who became a well-known virtuoso performing throughout Europe in the 19th century. Johann began work as a tailor's apprentice to his father while learning to play flute on the side. Oppersdorff noticed the talent of the young tailor and invited Johann to join the Royal Orchestra. Sedlatzek was a member of the orchestra which played for Beethoven during the Master's visit to Silesia in 1806. This first contact with Beethoven evolved into a musical partnership between the two artists that became the foundation for Sedlatzek's long and successful musical career.
