= Giovanni Stanetti =

Austrian sculptor

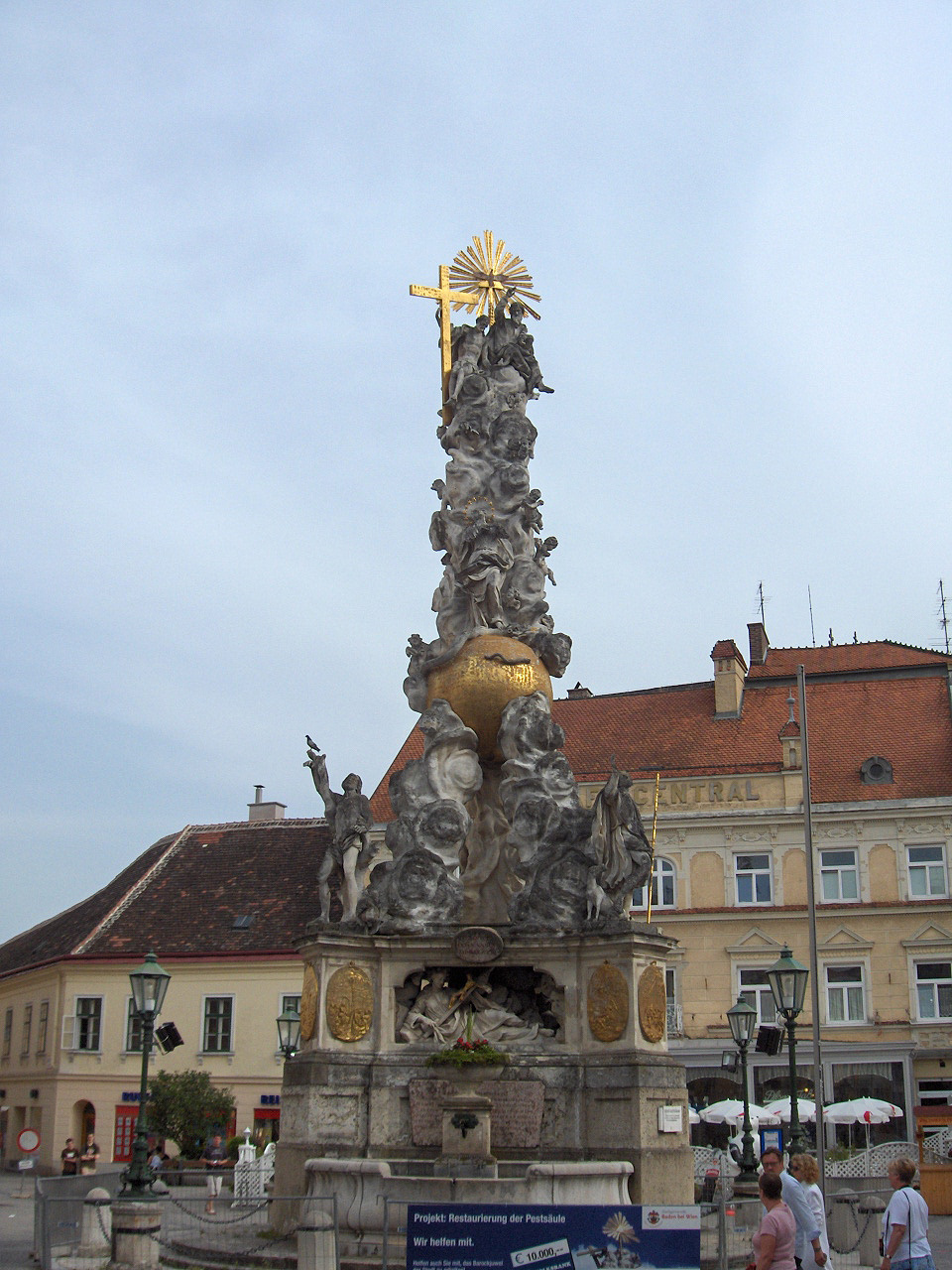
- Plague Column, Stockerau
- Born: 1663; Oberglogau, Upper Silesia
- Died: 19 July 1726 (aged 62–63); Vienna, Austria
- Education: Venice
- Known for: Sculpture
- Notable work: Lower Belvedere, Belvedere, Vienna

Johann Stanety, known as Giovanni Stanetti (1663 – 19 July 1726) was an Austrian sculptor who learned his craft in Venice. His most famous works are the sculptures and balustrade of the Lower Belvedere, in the Belvedere Castle, Vienna.

== Life and work ==
He was born in Oberglogau (Głogówek) near Neustadt (Prudnik), Upper Silesia, which was then part of Austria. He had a sculpture workshop in Venice. Prince Eugene of Savoy managed to persuade him to move to Vienna, along with his workshop.

From 1700 to 1721, in collaboration with architect Lukas von Hildebrandt, he created a series of sculptures for the balustrades and other decorative sculpture for the Lower Belvedere in Vienna. Other works include the 1700 relief for the tombstone of Count Siegfried Sarau in the Deutschordenskirche, (Singerstrasse, Vienna), the relief on the gable of the Karlskirche, entitled the Apotheosis of St. Charles Borromeo in memory of the plague (1725), and a further plague monument in Baden bei Wien, featuring Mary Magdalene.

In 1712, following the death of Emperor Joseph I, he became court sculptor.

== Sources ==
- Artisti Italiani Austria: STANETTI, Giovanni
