= Albert Willimsky =

Roman Catholic priest opposed to Nazism (1890–1940)

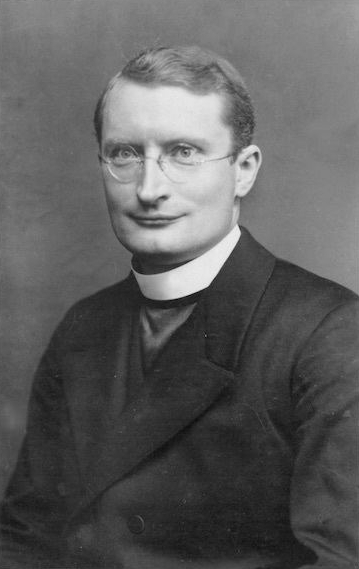
Albert Willimsky

Albert Willimsky (29 December 1890 – 22 February 1940) was a German Roman Catholic priest active in resistance movement against the National Socialism, martyred in the Sachsenhausen concentration camp.

== Biography ==
Willimsky was born on 29 December 1890 in Oberglogau (now Głogówek) in Prussian Silesia. After he finished secondary school, he started his theological studies at the Breslau University. During the World War I, he decided to suspend his studies to work as a medic and later, as a radio-telegraphist. He was ordained as a priest on 22 June 1919 at the cathedral of Breslau Diocese, and became a vicar in Bytom.

In 1933, while he was a provost in Friesack (Havelland district), he openly criticized Nazism, and because of that he fell into conflict with local authorities. In March 1935 he had to leave this parish and became a provost in Gransee. In October 1938, he was arrested for the first time by the Gestapo. He was freed on 1 May 1939 and in July of the same year he became a provost in Podjuchy – which was at the time the only Roman Catholic parish in Stettin (now Szczecin). Here he encountered maltreatment of Polish forced labourers working in extremely difficult conditions. His further criticism of Nazism and protection of the Polish labourers led to his denunciation in January 1940, when he was arrested for the second time and sent to Sachsenhausen concentration camp in Oranienburg. He died several weeks later.

== Memory ==
- Parc named Park im. Alberta Willimskyego in Szczecin-Podjuchy, where he worked in years 1939-1940,
- Commemorative plaque in a crypt of St. Hedwig's Cathedral,
- Commemorative plaque in Gransee, also in memory priest Paul Bartsch.
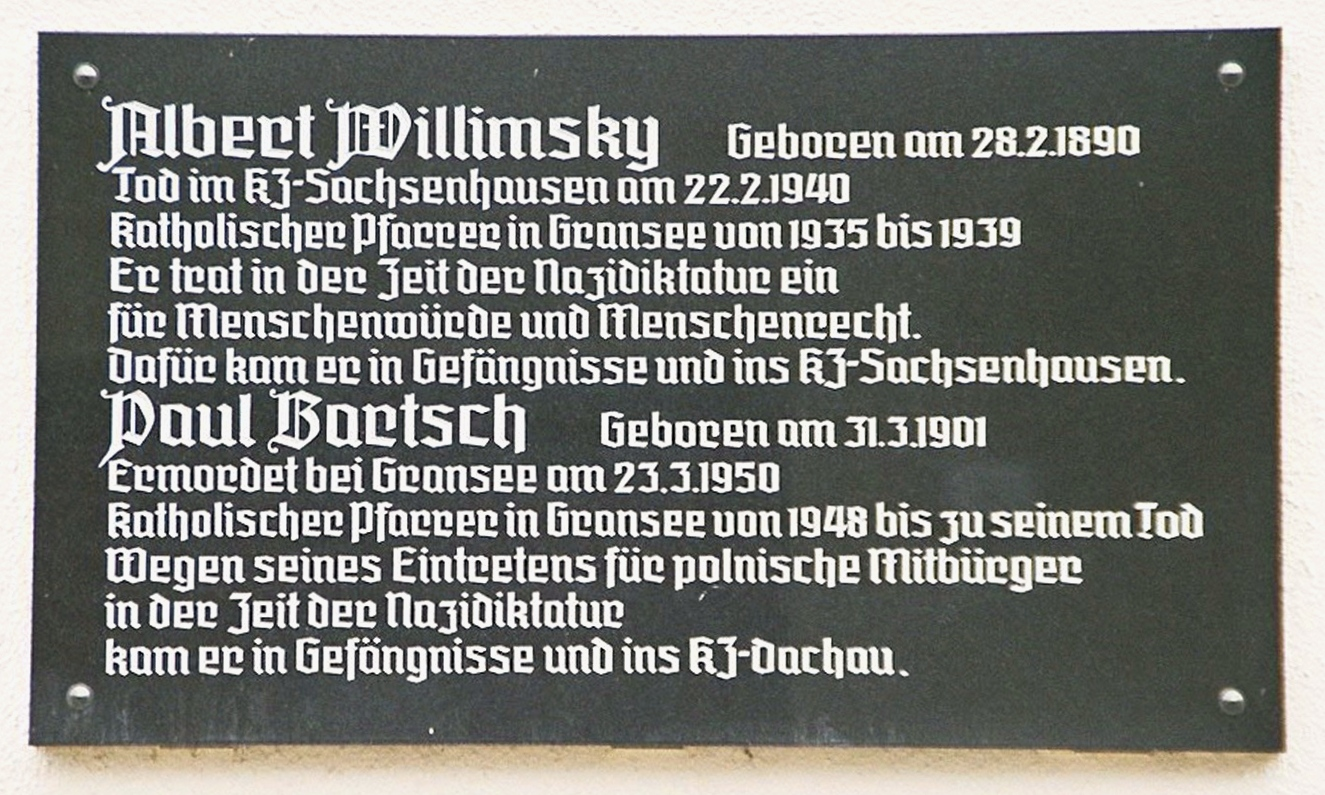
Commemorative plaque in Gransee in memory of priests Albert Willimsky and Paul Bartsch, who spoke for Polish forced labourers in times of Nazism

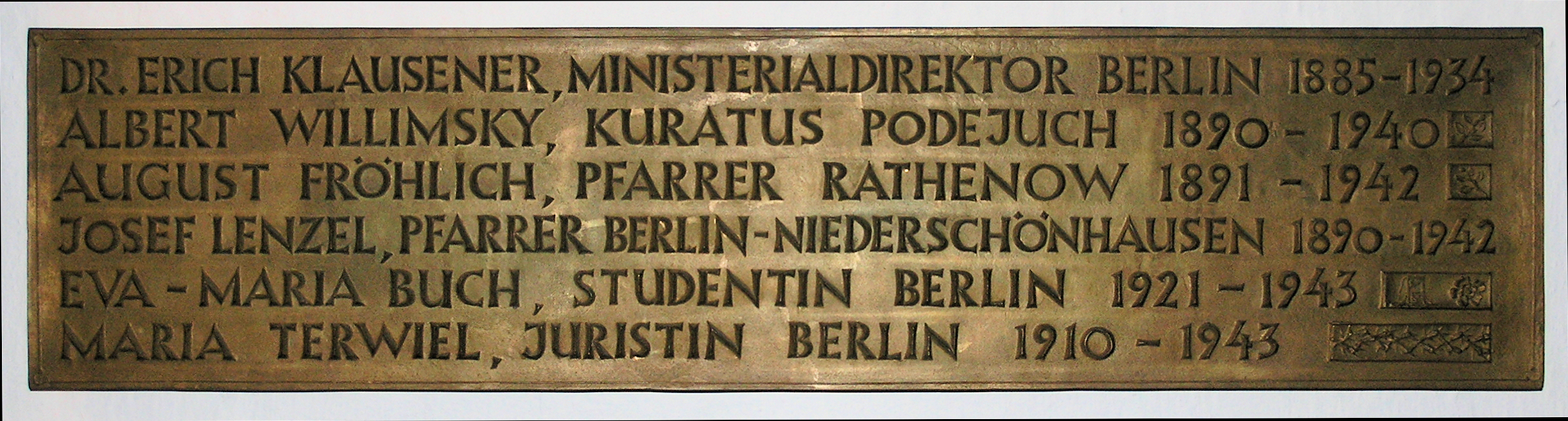
A part of a commemorative plaque in memorial of Catholics of Archdiocese of Berlin murdered during the war, in a crypt of St. Hedwig's Cathedral in Berlin

== Bibliography ==
- Bogdan Frankiewicz, Ksiądz Albert Willimsky - przykład chrześcijańskiej postawy wobec zbrodni nazizmu. w pracy zbiorowej pod red. Mariana Grzędy Antyfaszystowska działalność Kościoła katolickiego i ewangelickiego na Pomorzu Zachodnim. : Pastor Dietrich Bonhoeffer i ksiądz Albert Willimsky. Wydawnictwo Naukowe Uniwersytetu Szczecińskiego, Szczecin 2003. ISBN 83-7241-324-X
- Helmut Moll, Ursula Pruß, Pfarrer Albert Willimsky in monography: Zeugen für Christus. Das deutsche Martyrologium des 20. Jahrhunderts site 94-97. Verlag Ferdinand Schöningh, Paderborn 1999. ISBN 978-3-506-75778-4
- Heinz Kühn, Blutzeugen des Bistums Berlin. Klausener, Lichtenberg, Lampert, Lorenz, Simoleit, Mandrella, Hirsch, Wachsmann, Metzger, Schäfer, Willimsky, Lenzel, Froehlich. Morus-Verlag, Berlin 1952
