= Forti (surname) =

Forti is an Italian surname. Notable people with the surname include:

- Anton Forti (1790–1859), Austrian operatic baritone
- Baruch Uzziel Forti (fl. 16th century), Italian rabbi
- Carl Forti (born c. 1972), American political consultant
- Ettore Forti (late 19th century - early 20th century), Italian Neoclassical painter
- Giuseppe Forti (1939–2007), Italian astronomer
- Guido Forti (1940–2013), Italian Formula One team founder and manager
- Simone Forti (born 1935), American choreographer and musician

== See also ==
- Cesare Burali-Forti (1861–1931), Italian mathematician
- Fortis (disambiguation)
