= Vortis =

Vortis may refer to:

- Vortis (Doctor Who), a fictional planet in the British science fiction series Doctor Who
- Vortis, an indie rock band including drummer Jim DeRogatis
- Tokushima Vortis, a professional soccer club in Japan
- The Red Shiny Robots of Vortis appear in the TV series Hyperdrive

== See also ==
- Fortis (disambiguation)
