= Baruch Uzziel Forti =

Italian rabbi and editor

Baruch Uzziel ben Baruch Forti Chaschetto (Hebrew: ברוך עזיאל בן ברוך חזקיטו) (Note: The name "Forti" is an Italian translation of the Hebrew family name "Ḥazaḳ" (חזק). The diminutive "Chaschetto" (חזקיטו) was coined afterward.) was an Italian rabbi and editor, who lived in Ferrara and Mantua in the sixteenth century.

On May 22, 1564, Forti was named Chief Rabbi of Mantua. He is quoted as an authority by several prominent rabbis, including Moses Isserles and Meïr of Padua. Forti edited Isaac Abravanel's Ma'yene ha-Yeshu'ah, to which he added a preface containing Abravanel's biography (Ferrara, 1551), and Moses Alashkar's strictures on Shem-Tov's Sefer ha-Emunot (Ferrara, 1556). He also published an alphabetical index to the Mishneh Torah (Venice, 1586).
