= Fortey =

Fortey is a surname. Notable people with the surname include:

- Chris Fortey (born 1975), English rugby union player
- Emily Fortey (1866–1946), British chemist
- Richard Fortey (1946–2025), British palaeontologist, natural historian, writer and television presenter

== See also ==
- 40 (number)
- Forti (surname)
