= Moses Alashkar =

Moses ben Isaac Alashkar (1466–1542) (משה אלשקר) was a rabbi who lived in Egypt, but subsequently resided in Jerusalem.

Moses Alashkar was prominent among contemporaneous rabbis, and his opinions were held in esteem throughout the Levant, and even in Italy. In a letter to Elijah ha-Levi—the teacher of Elijah Mizrachi—he complained that his large correspondence deprived him of much of the time due to his professional duties. The two following are the most important of his works: (1) Hassagot (Critical Notes), in which he demolishes the whole dogmatical structure built up in Shem Tov ibn Shem Tov's Sefer ha-Emunot; (2) Responsa, 121 in number. Both were printed together at Sabbionetta, 1553. A separate edition of the Hassagot appeared three years later at Ferrara. This collection, which reached even distant Jewish communities, is of importance for the geographical names in rabbinical writings and in bills of divorce.

== Jewish Encyclopedia bibliography ==
- Jew. Quart. Rev. vi. 400, x. 133, xii. 119;
- Oẓar Nehmad, iii. 105;
- Steinschneider, Cat. Bodl. col. 1765;
- Fürst, Bibl. Jud. i. 30;
- Michael, Heimann Joseph (1891). Or ha-Ḥayyim. Frankfort-on-the-Main. No. 45.
