= Fortis (aerojeep) =

Fortis is a propelled ground vehicle ("aerojeep") designed by Zhukovsky Aerodynamics Research Institute and by the group of students from MAMI Moscow State Technical University. It can ride both on ground and water while maintaining good stability. Fortis has Chevy 350 as its engine its main features include the speed up to 100 kilometres per hour (62 mph) and resource of 6 hours.
