= Fortis =

Fortis may refer to:

== Business ==
- Fortis (Swiss watchmaker), a Swiss watch company
- Fortis Films, an American film and television production company founded by actress and producer Sandra Bullock
- Fortis Healthcare, a chain of hospitals in India
- Fortis Inc., a Canadian utility holding company
- Fortis Group, a defunct banking, financial services, and insurance company, based in the Benelux or their successors:
  - Ageas, formed from the insurance operations of Fortis
  - ASR Nederland, formed from the Dutch insurance operations of Fortis
  - BNP Paribas Fortis, formed from the Belgian banking operations of Fortis, now owned by BNP Paribas
  - ABN AMRO, formed from the Netherlands banking operations of Fortis, now owned by the Dutch government
  - BGL BNP Paribas, formed from the Luxembourg banking operations of Fortis, now owned by BNP Paribas

== People ==
- Alberto Fortis (1741–1803), Venetian writer, naturalist and cartographer
- Alberto Fortis (musician) (born 1955), Italian singer and songwriter
- Alessandro Fortis (1842–1909), Italian politician and prime minister
- Jean-Baptiste-Boniface de Fortis (1746–1836), French politician
- Louis Fortis (born 1947), American politician
- Luigi Fortis (1748–1829), Italian Jesuit
- Rami Fortis (born 1954), Israeli rock musician

== Other ==
- Fortis (aerojeep), a propelled ground vehicle
- Fortis (linguistics), consonants produced with greater energy than lenis ones
- Mitsubishi Galant Fortis, a compact car also known as the Mitsubishi Lancer
- Fortis College

== See also ==
- Aqua fortis
