= Shem Tov ibn Shem Tov =

Spanish kabbalist

Shem Tov ibn Shem Tov (c. 1390 – c. 1440) (Hebrew: שם טוב אבן שם טוב) was a Spanish kabbalist and fierce opponent of rationalistic philosophy.

Tov was president of a yeshivah in Spain. He lived about 1390-1440 (Gedaliah ibn Yaḥya, Shalshelet ha-Ḳabbalah, ed. Venice, p. 62b). He was the father of Joseph ibn Shem-Tov and Isaac ibn Shem-Tov.

== Works ==
He wrote: Sefer ha-Emunot, on religious dogmas (Ferrara, 1556); Sefer Yesodot (perhaps only another title for the preceding); a commentary on the Pesach Haggadah (Steinschneider, Cat. Munich, 264, 3; idem, Cat. Bodl. col. 99). The Sefer ha-Emunot is an attack on the Aristotelian philosophy and on the rationalistic conception of Judaism. It is also a eulogy of the Kabbalah, "the true teaching, which has lived on through tradition and which alone can help Israel." Shem Tov endeavors to prove that, from the standpoint of positive Judaism, there is not the agreement between religion and philosophy that is claimed by many Jewish philosophers. In the introduction he makes the philosophical investigators and the "enlightenment" brought about by them responsible for the defection from Judaism and for the political persecutions of the times. He renders especially severe judgments upon Maimonides (whom he understood to be withholding belief in resurrection), upon Abraham ibn Ezra, upon Levi ben Gershon, and upon other men of liberal views.

In his survey of the historical development of the Kabbala, Shem Tov cites a number of older kabbalistic writers, whose existence, however, is not thereby proved. This reference to them is appended to a short passage from the Zohar. Moses Alashkar vehemently opposed Shem Tov's dogmatic system in his Hassagot Al Mah She-Katab R. Shem-Tov Neged ha-RaMbaM (Ferrara, 1556). The Sefer ha-Emunot has been much cited by both old and modern authors, and is valuable for the history of the Kabbala. To judge from a remark on page 31b it would seem that Ibn Shem-Tov wrote other works, but nothing is known concerning them.

== Jewish Encyclopedia bibliography ==
- Grätz, Gesch. Hebr. ed. of Rabbinowitz, vi.99-100;
- Kaufmann, Die Attributenlehre, Index;
- Steinschneider, Cat. Bodl. cols. 2558 et seq.;
- idem, Jewish Literature, pp. 94, 304;
- idem, Die Polemische und Apologetische Litteratur, pp. 321, 367;
- idem, Hebr. Uebers. p. 120;
- M. Straschon, in Pirḥe Ẓafon, ii.77 et seq.;
- Winter and Wünsche, Die Jüdische Litteratur, iii.281, 365
