= Ettore Forti =

Italian painter

Ettore or Eduardo Ettore Forti was an Italian painter, who was prolific in depicting realistic Neo-Pompeian scenes of Ancient Roman life and events. These subjects were popular in the late-Victorian period, as exemplified by the popularity of Lawrence Alma-Tadema.

There is little definitive information available about Forti's biography. His paintings are signed with his name and Rome. Different sources can not cite a place of birth or birth date, and do not agree about a birth date. Nothing is known of his training. Many sources claim he was active a few decades before and after 1900. He exhibited in Berlin between 1893 and 1897. He exhibited at the Mostra della Romana Società degli Amatori e Cultori in 1905.

One favorite topic is a salesman displaying artwork, jewelry, or rugs to well-dressed female patrician women, often in elegant settings.

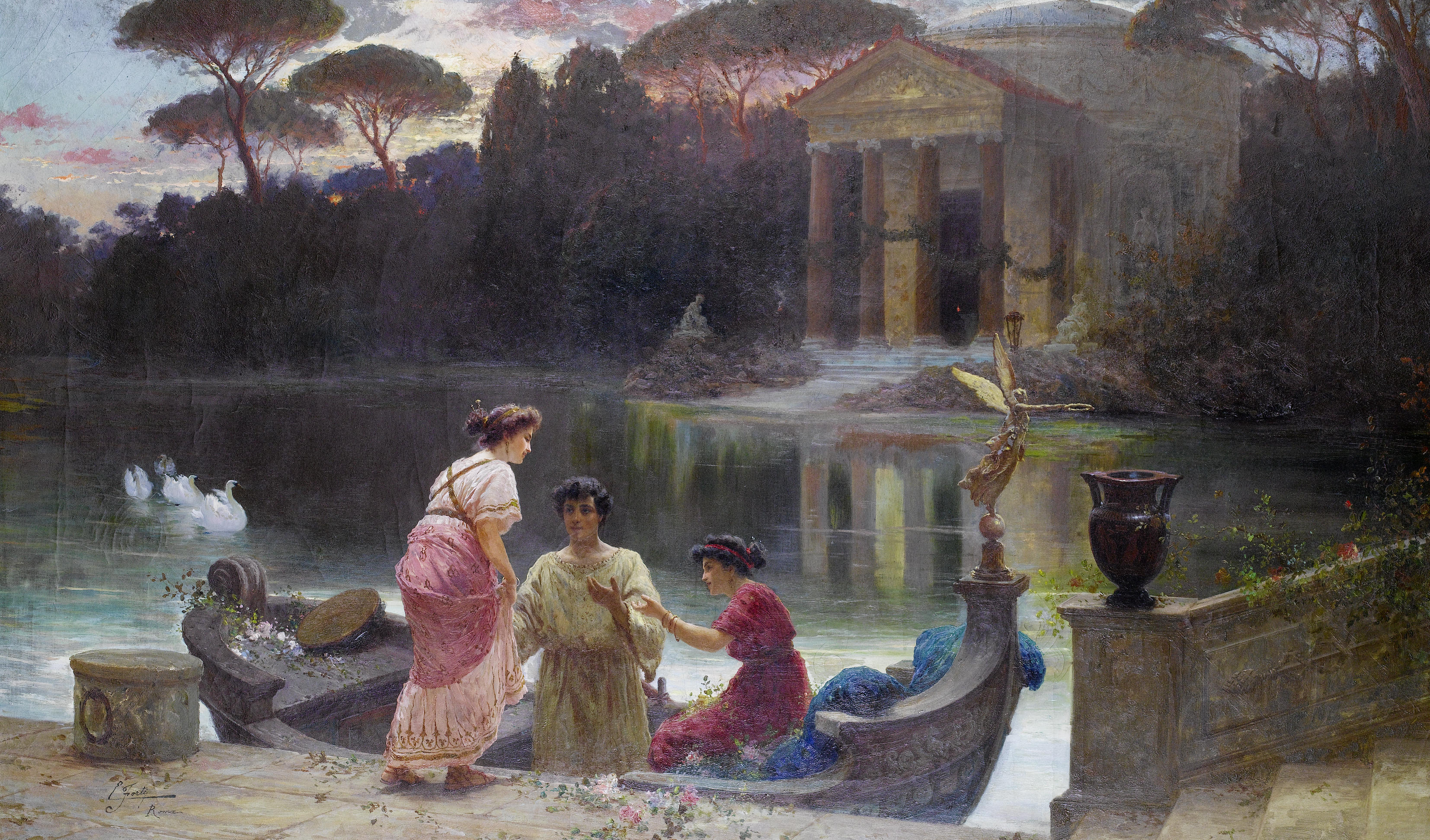
Evening at the temple

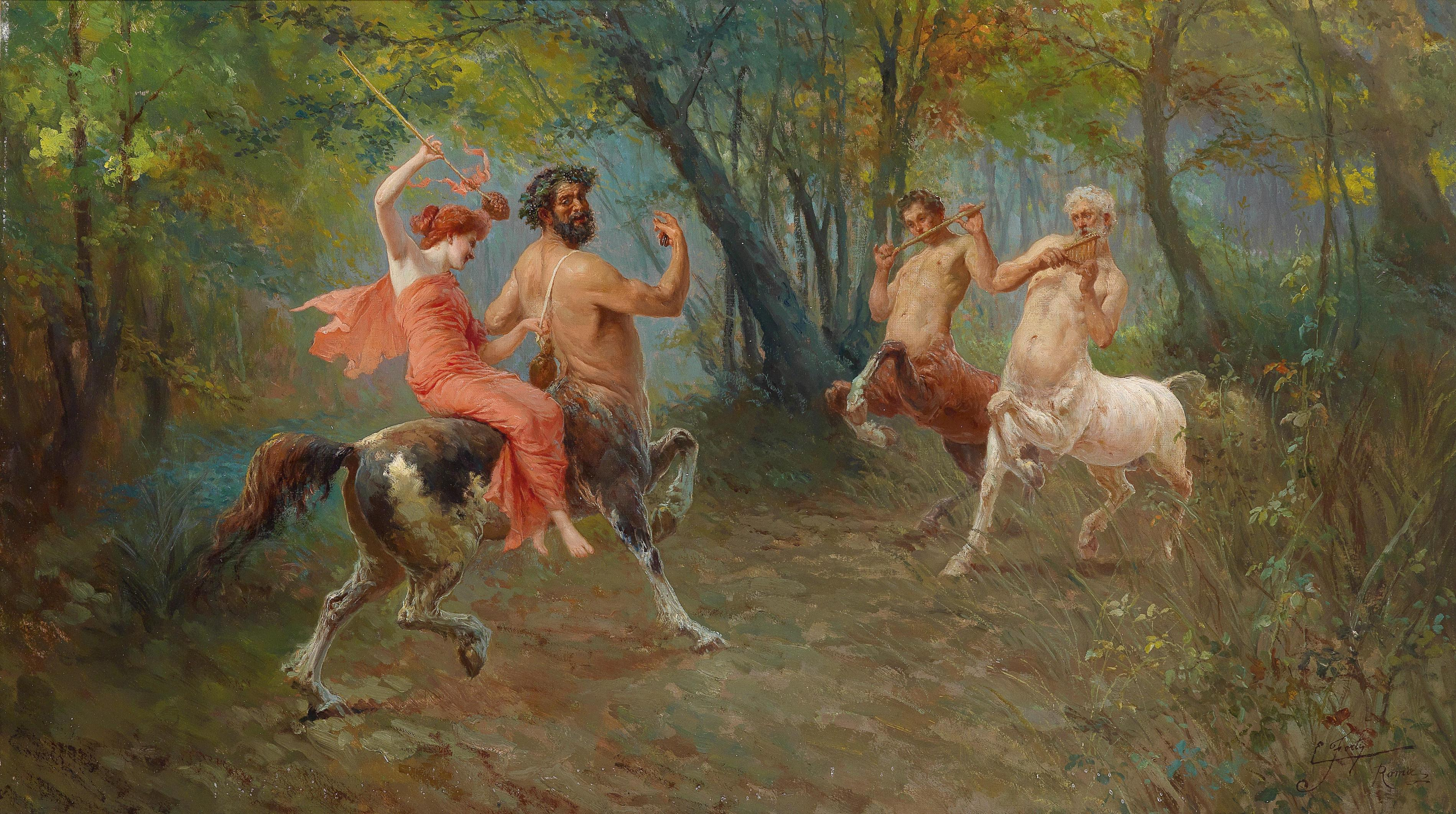
Feast of Centaurs

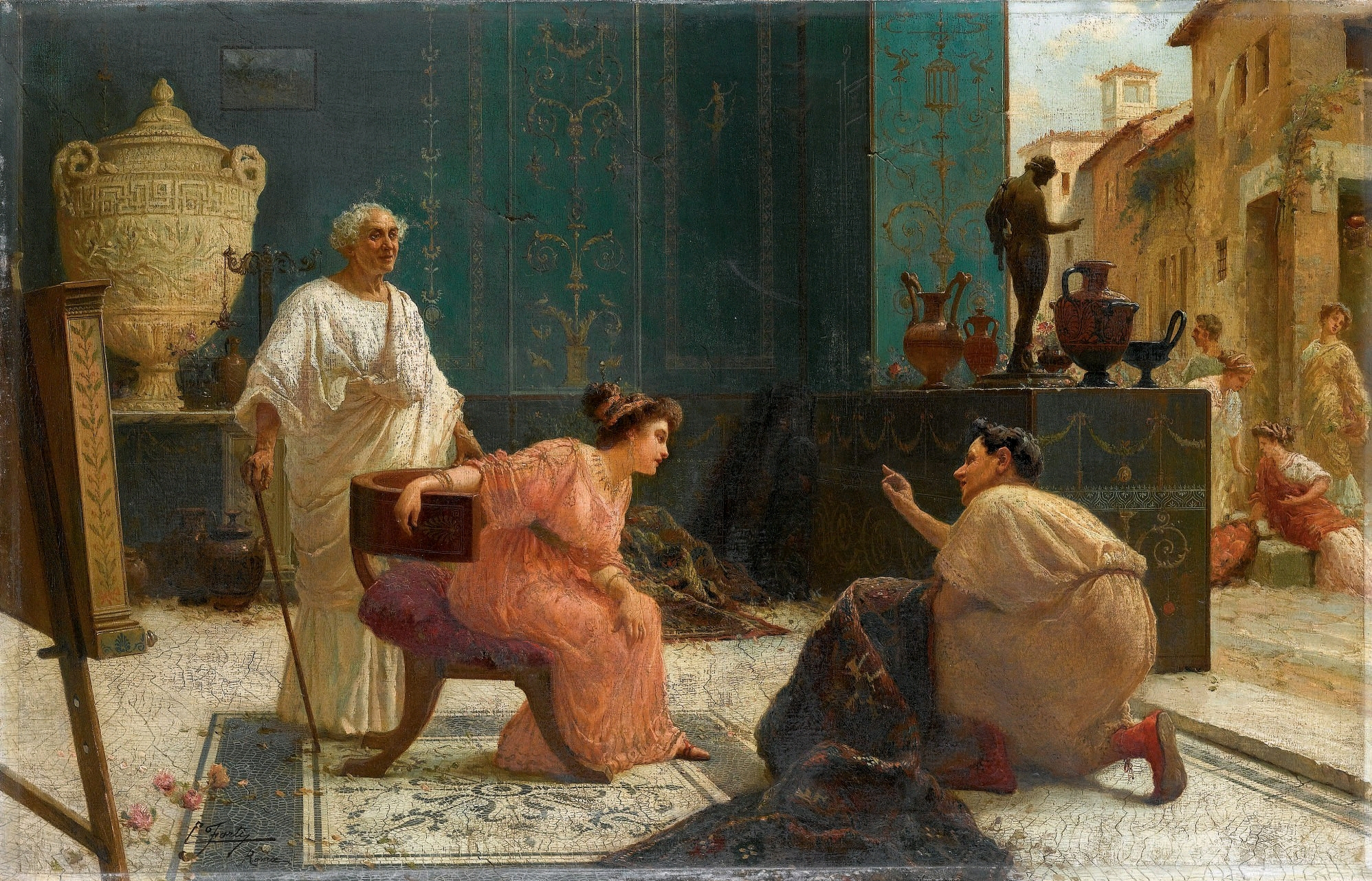
Rug Merchant in Ancient Rome

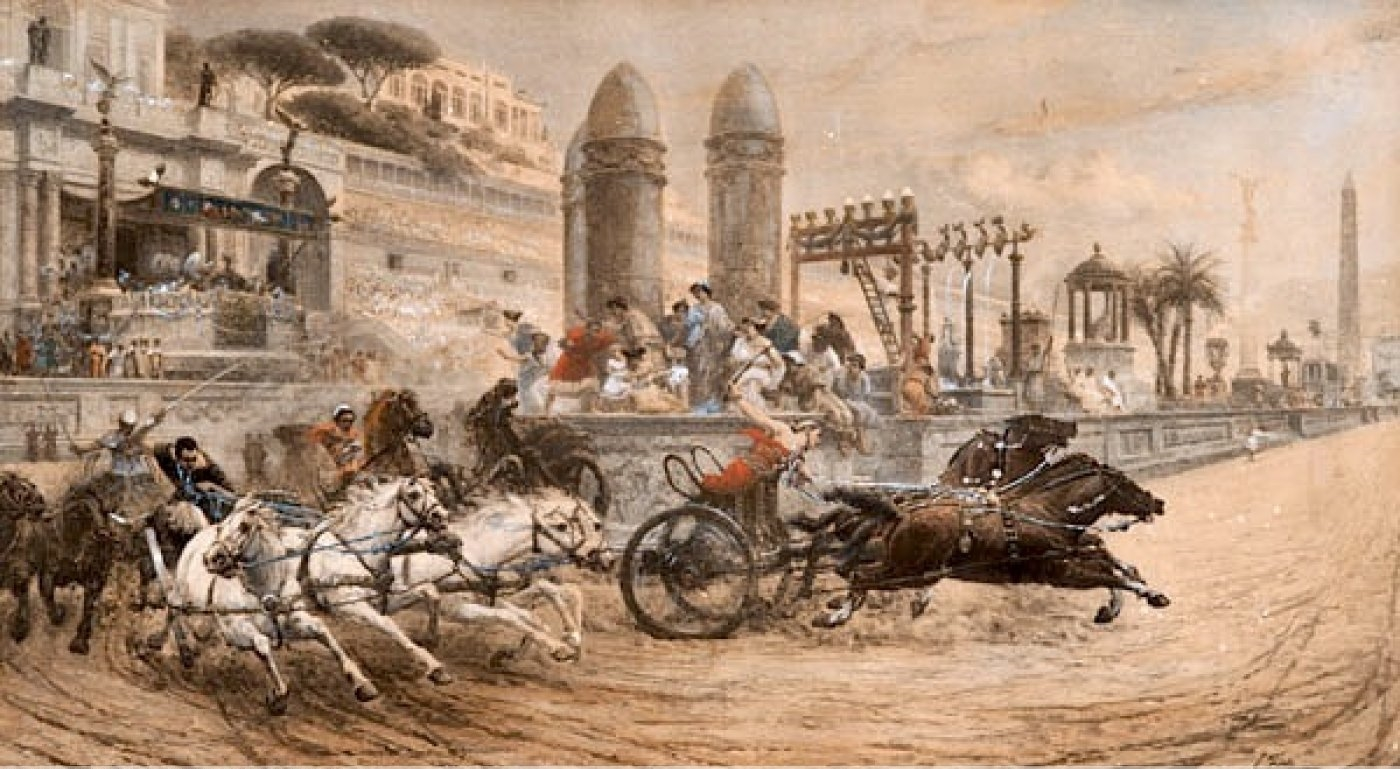
Chariots racing in the Circus Maximus

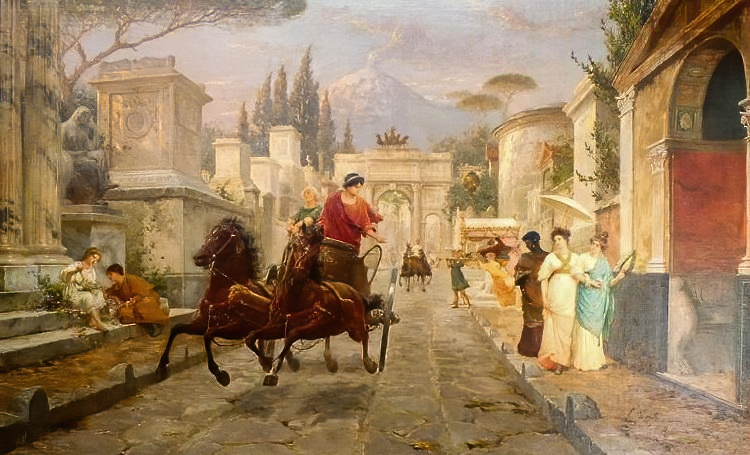
Pompeii Street Scene

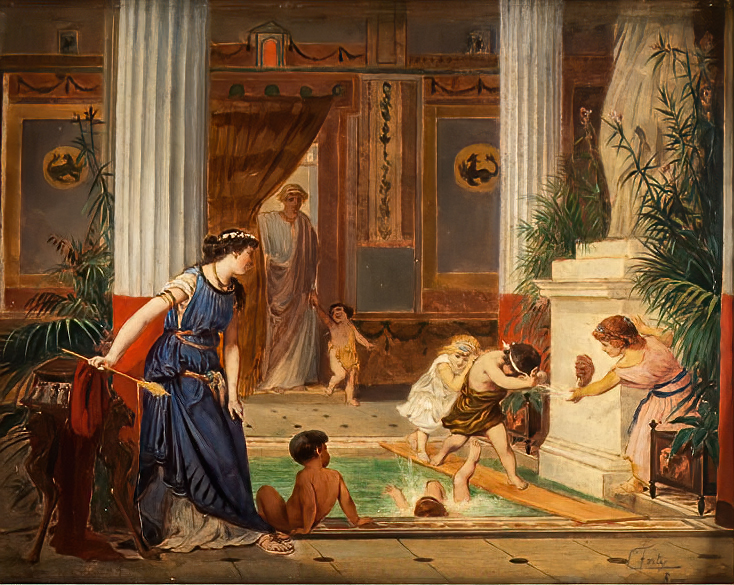
The Bath (?)

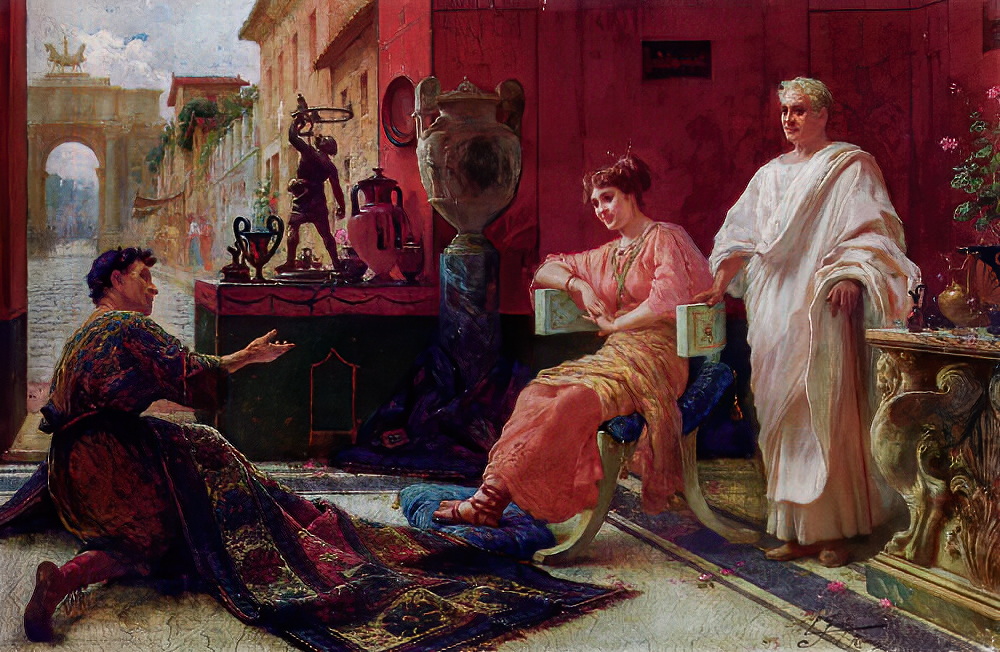
The Carpet Seller (1)

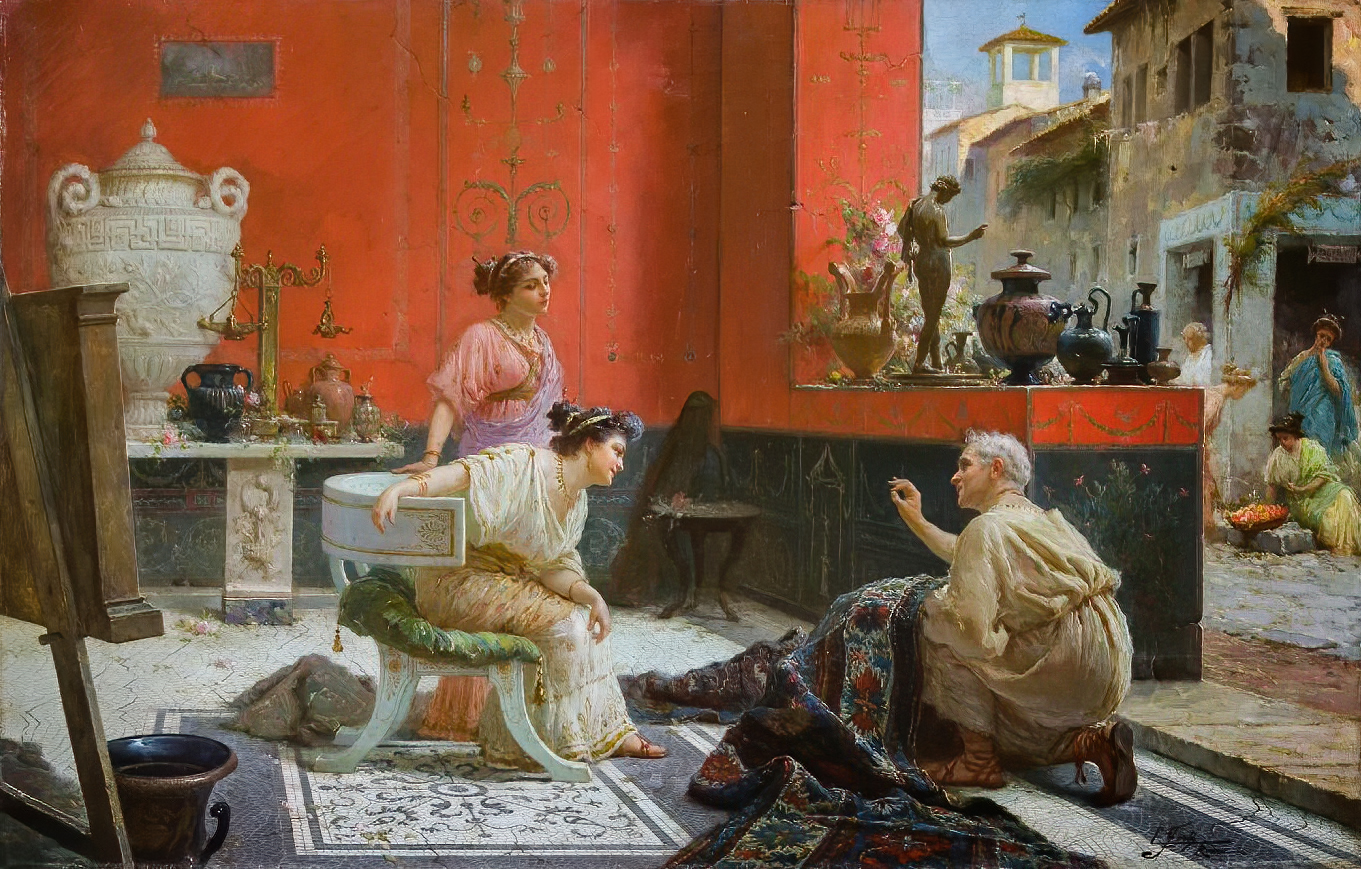
The Carpet Seller (2)

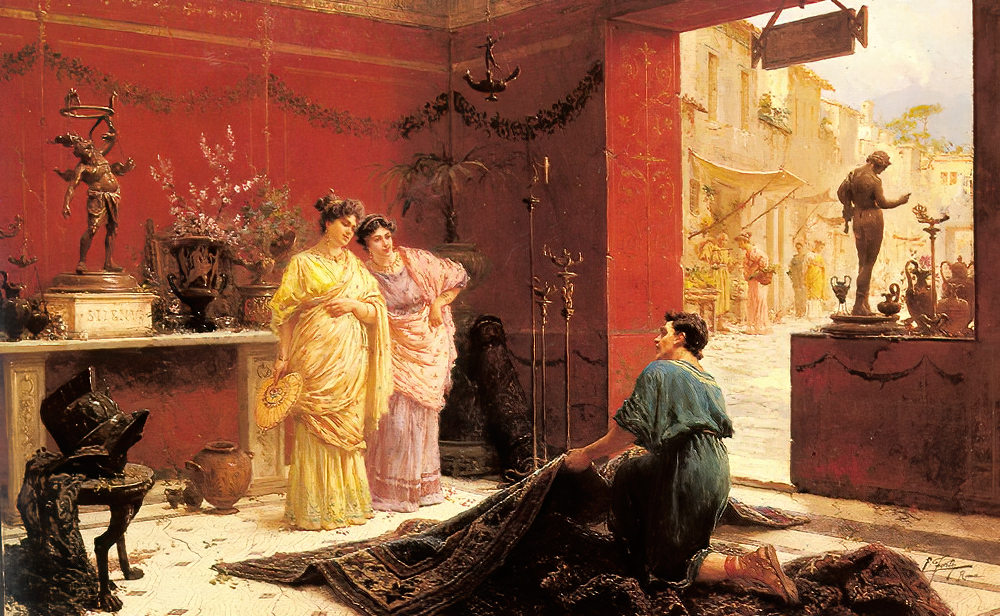
The Carpet seller (3)

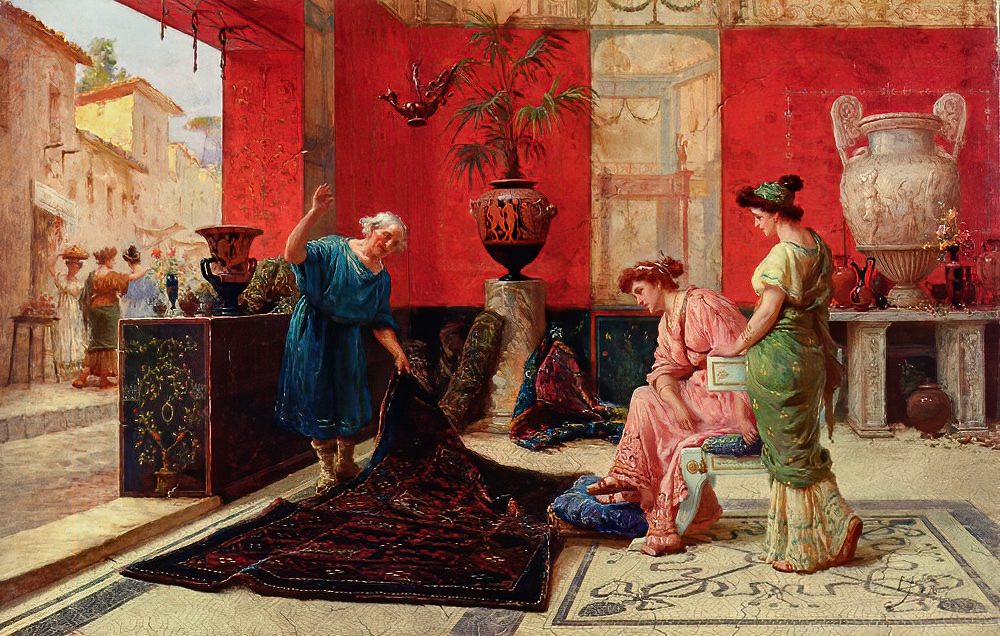
The Carpet seller (4)

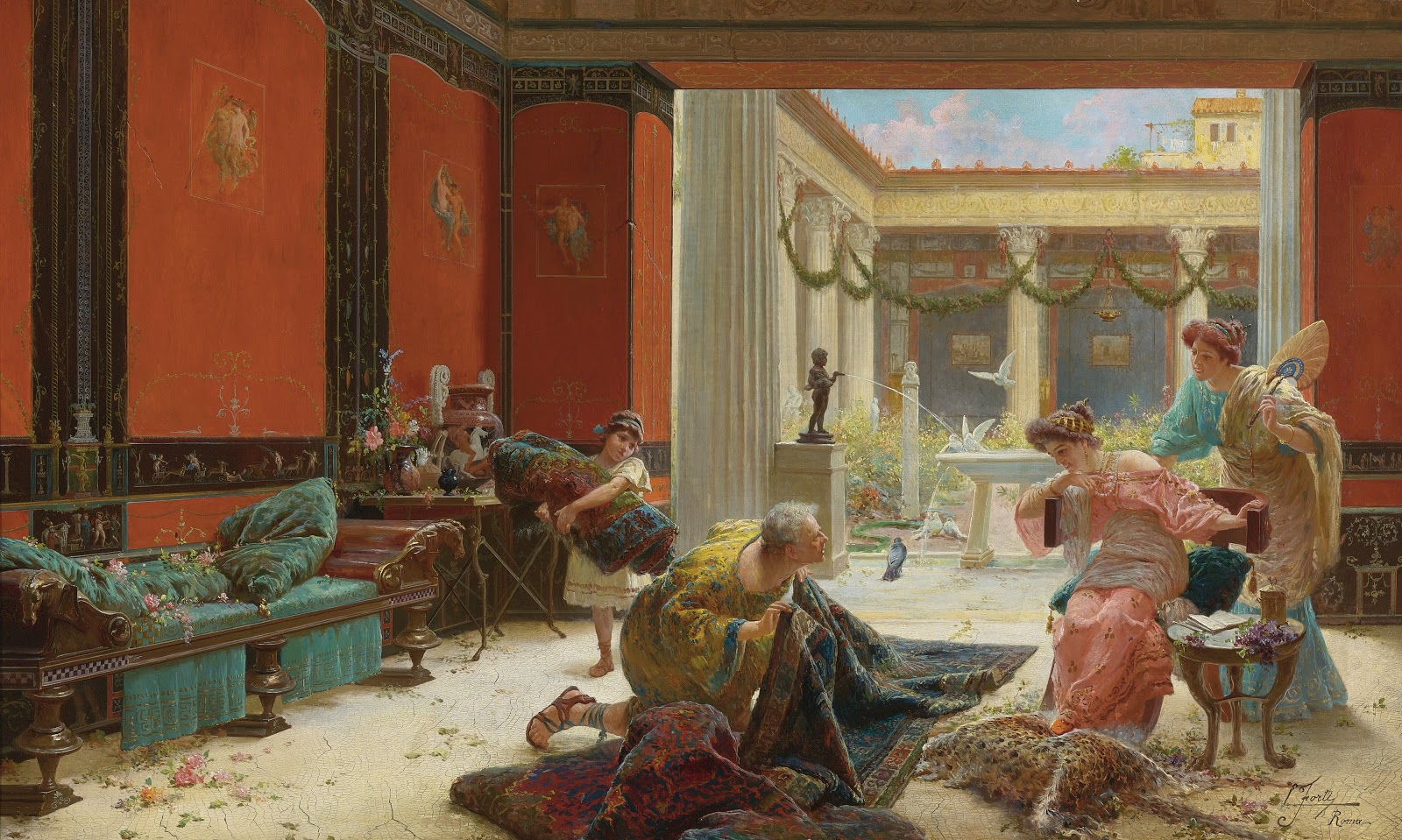
The Carpet Seller (5)

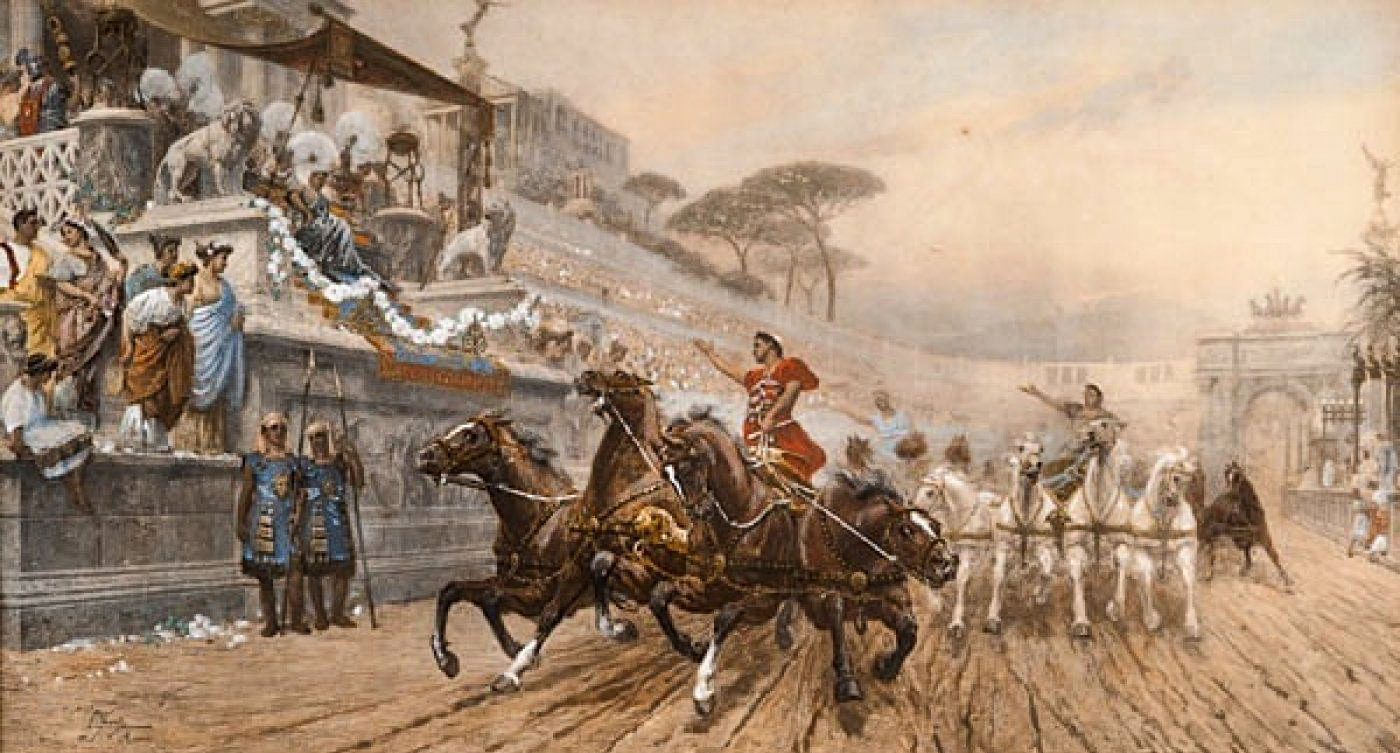
Chariot Racing

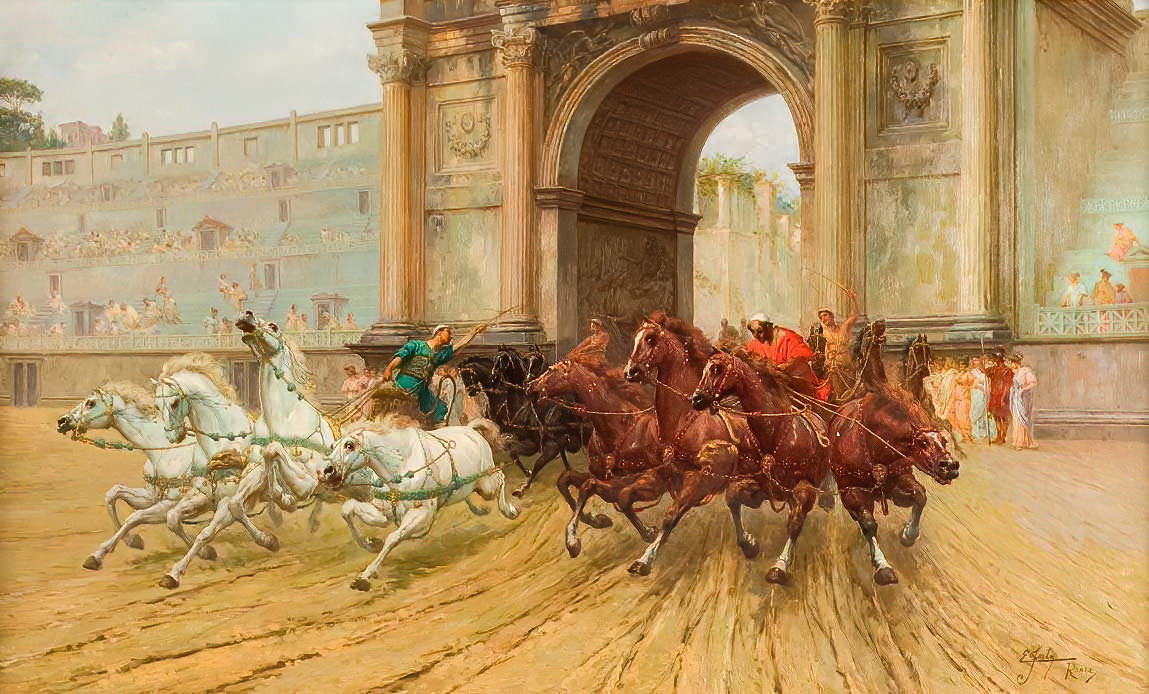
Racing Chariots Entering The Circus Maximus

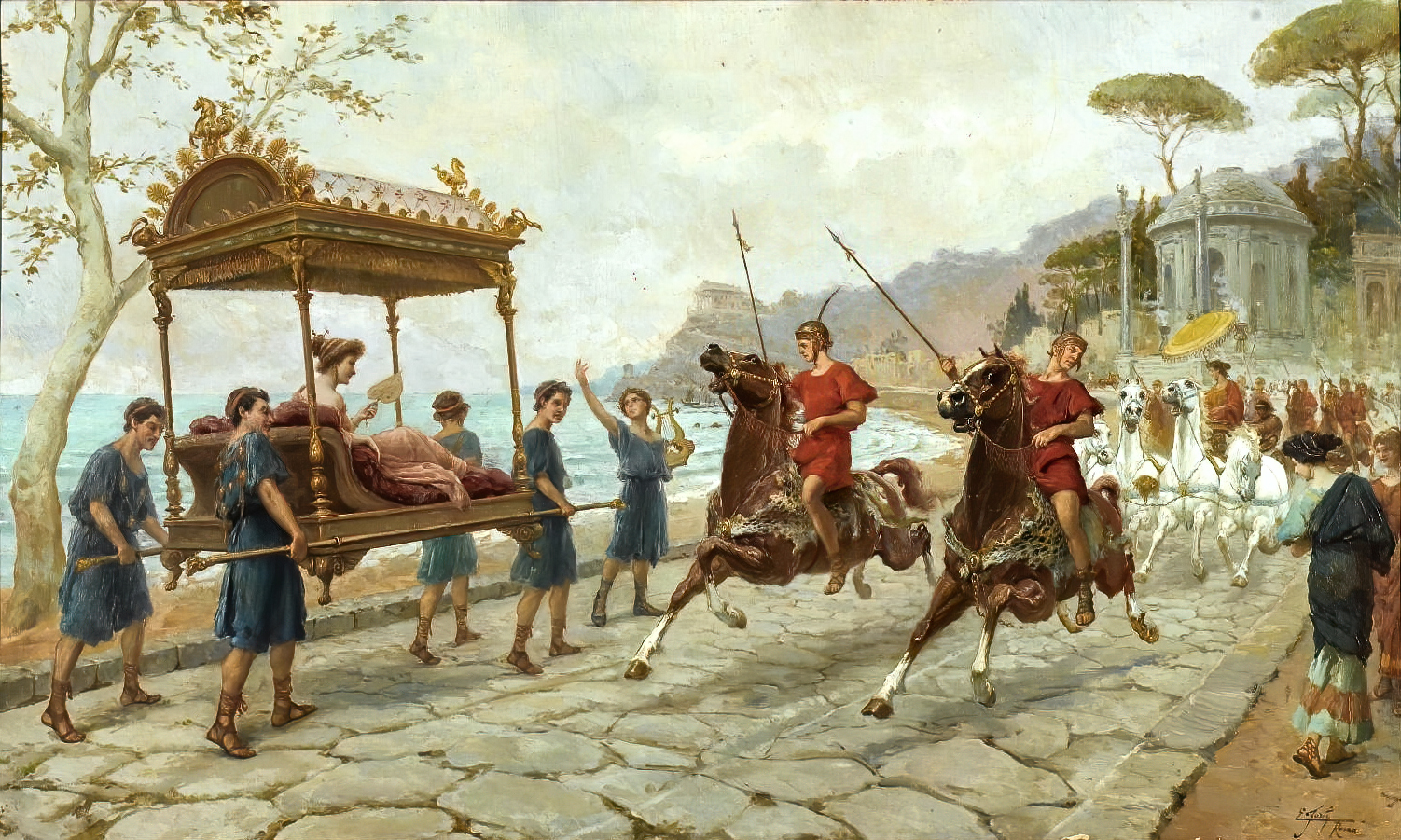
Road to Pompeii

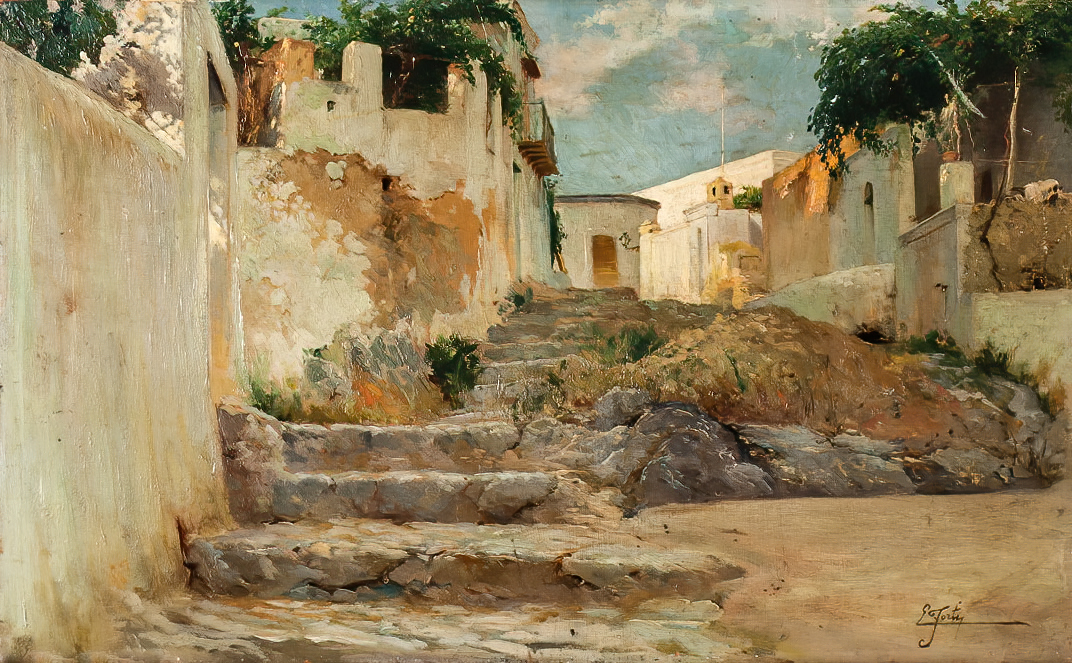
Steps(?)

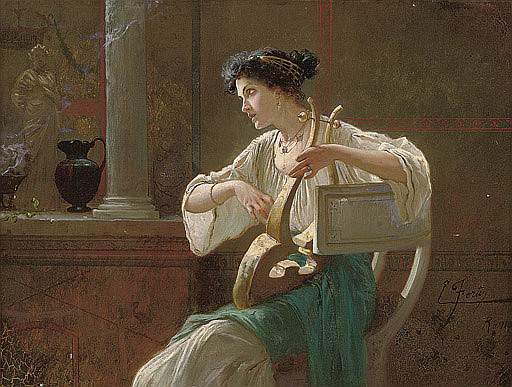
The Harpist(?)

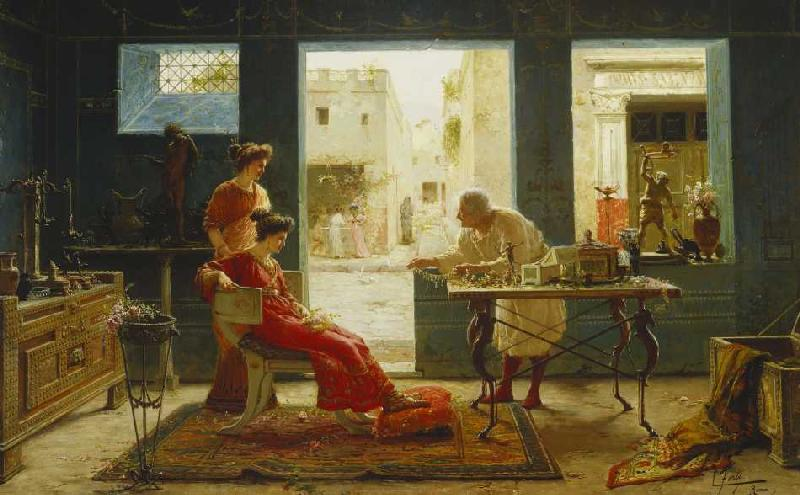
In A Jewelry Store

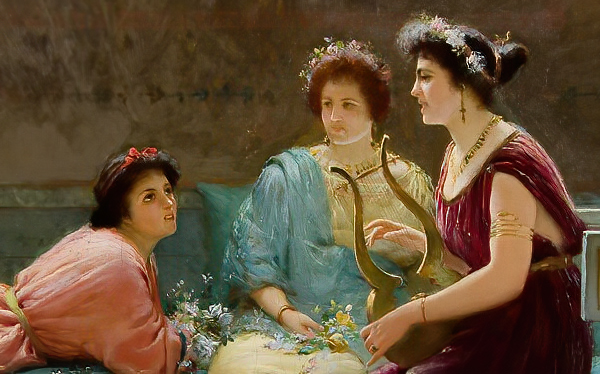
Detail from a Pompeii Love Song

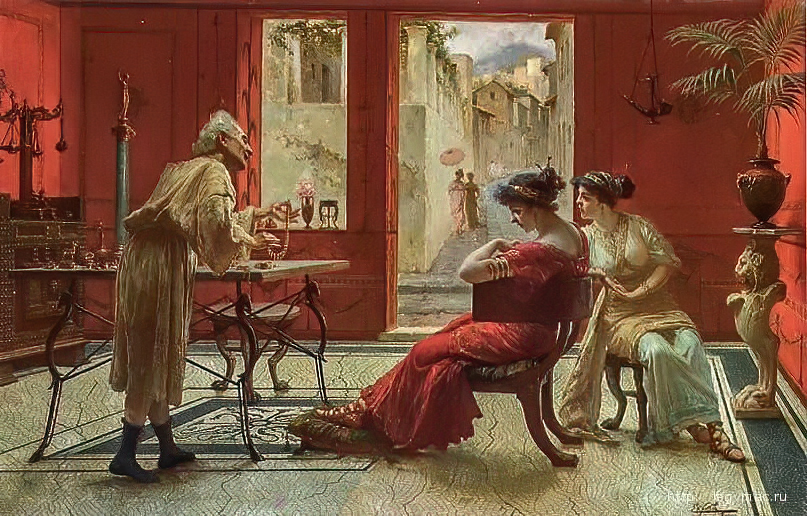
In A Jewelry Store

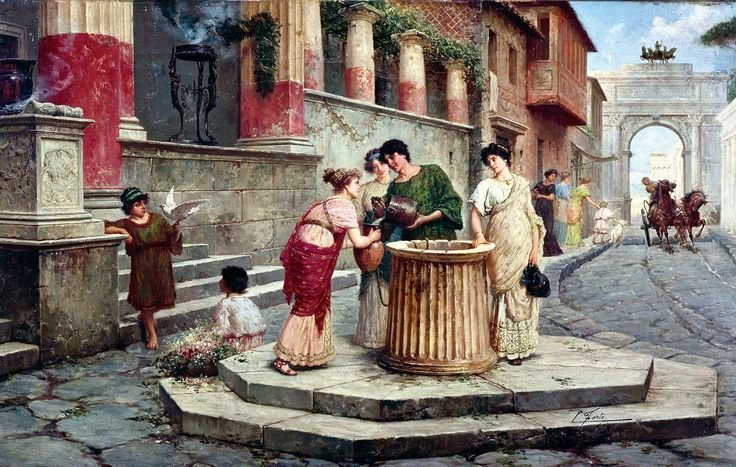
Pompeii Street

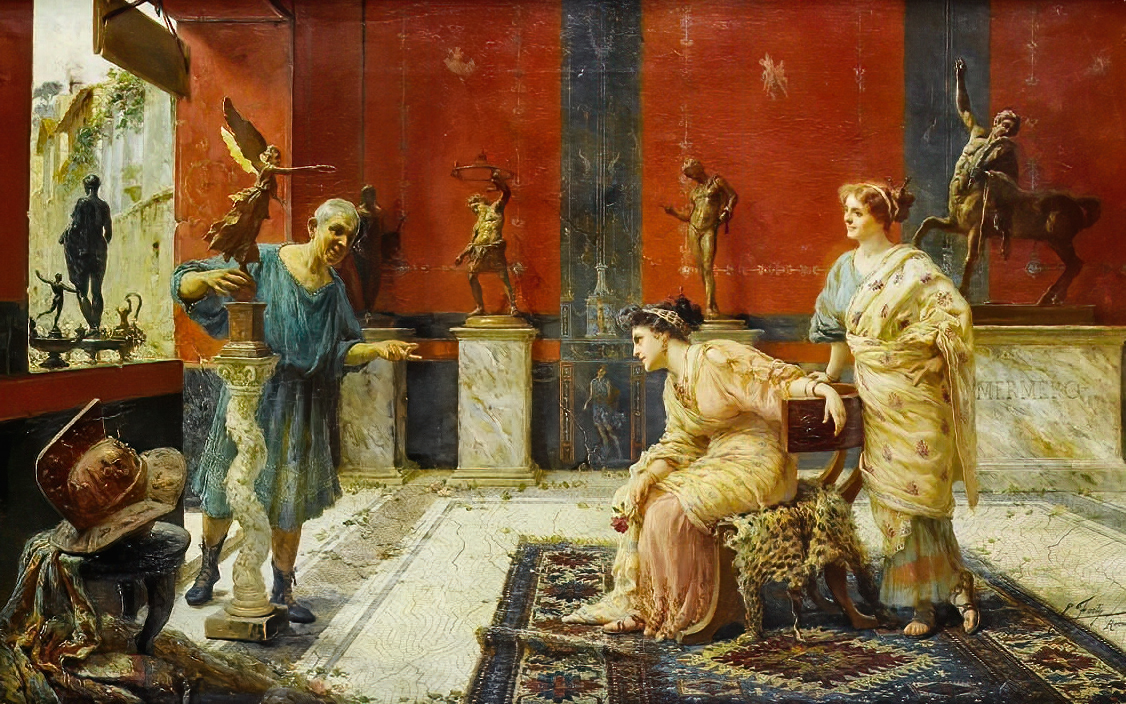
Art Seller

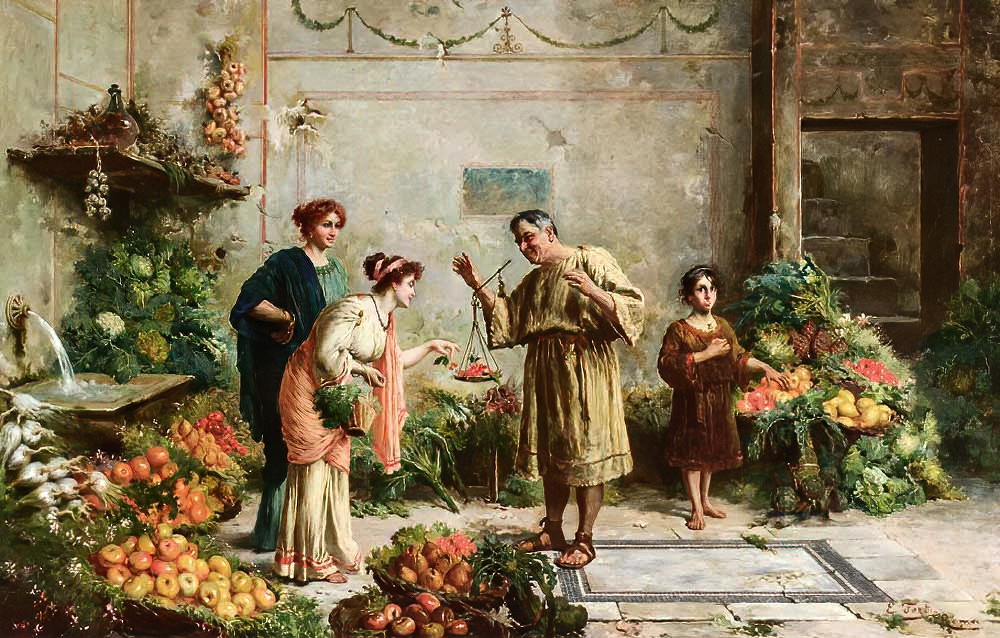
Fruit Vendor

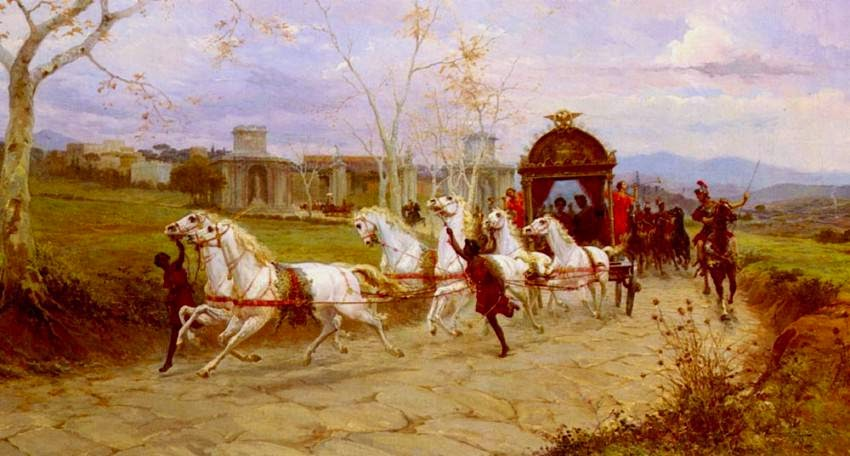
Hadrian returns from Tivoli

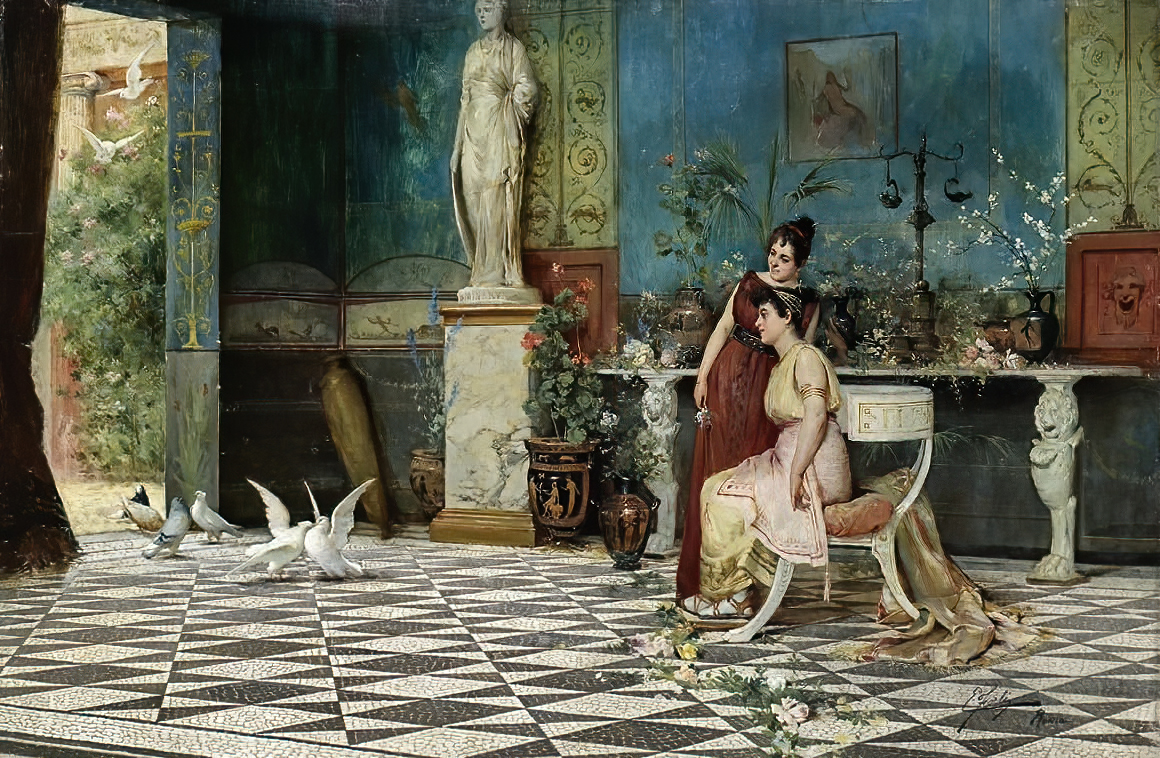
In the Roman Palace

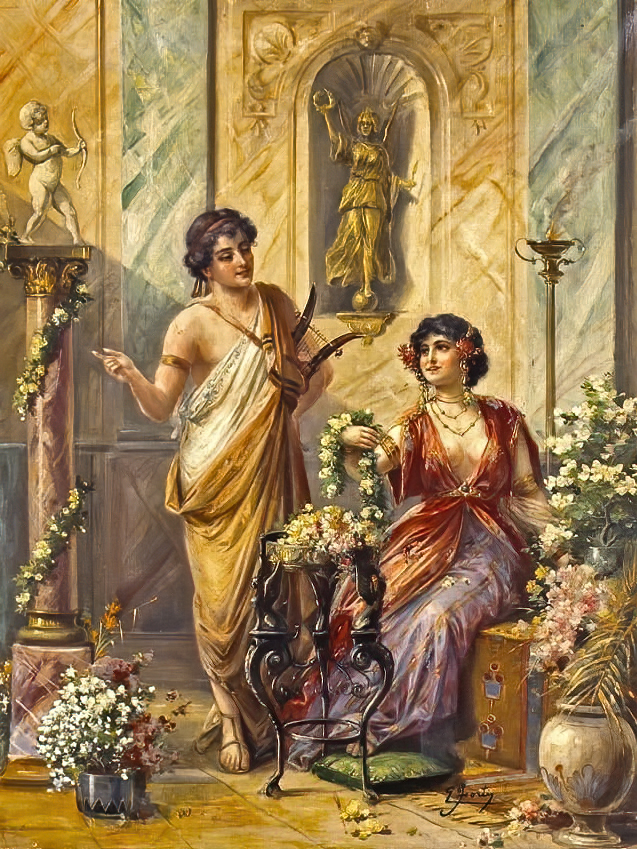
Inside A Roman Villa

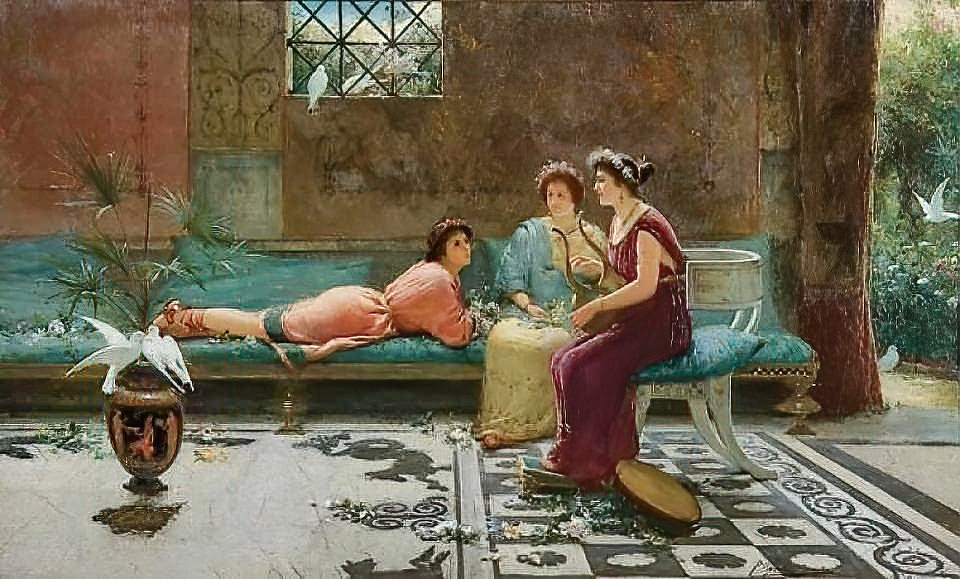
Pompeii Love Song

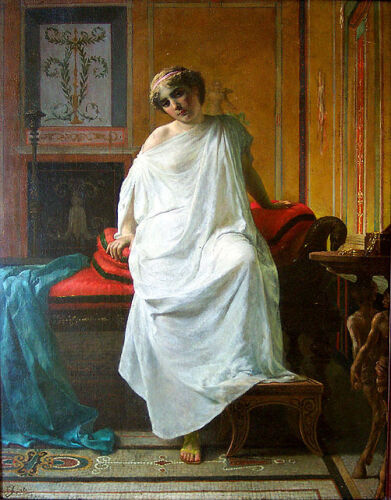
The Bedchamber(?)

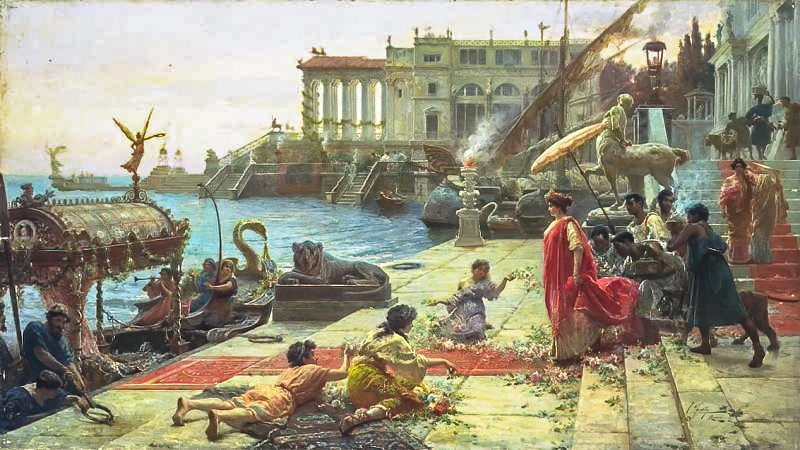
The Embarkment of a Roman Queen

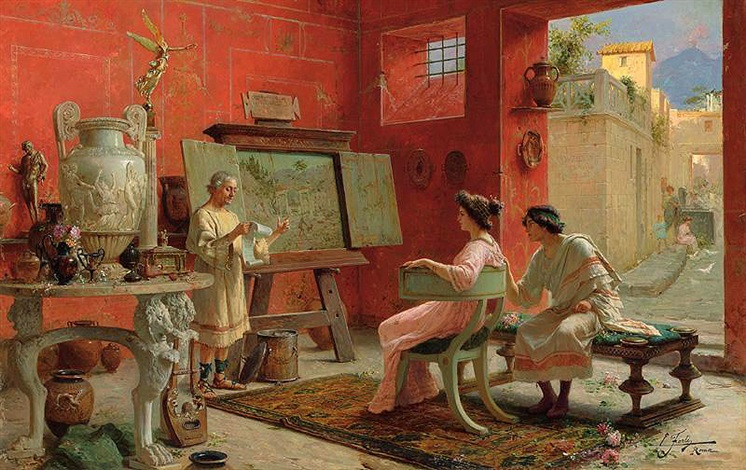
The Art Seller

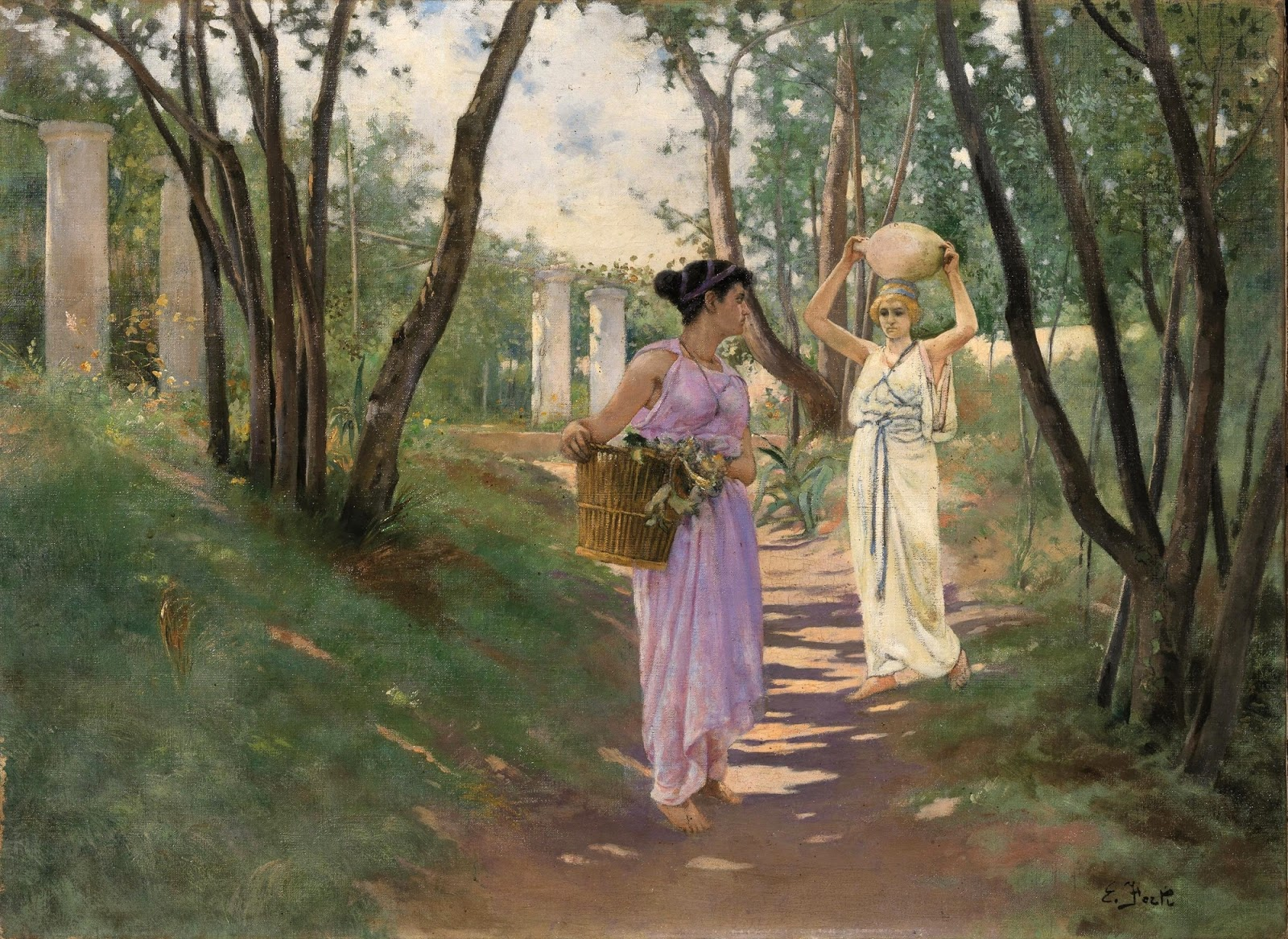
Burdens(?)

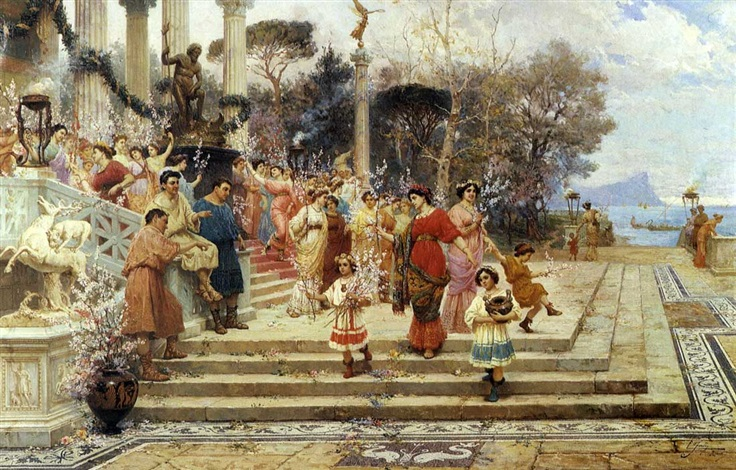
Festival

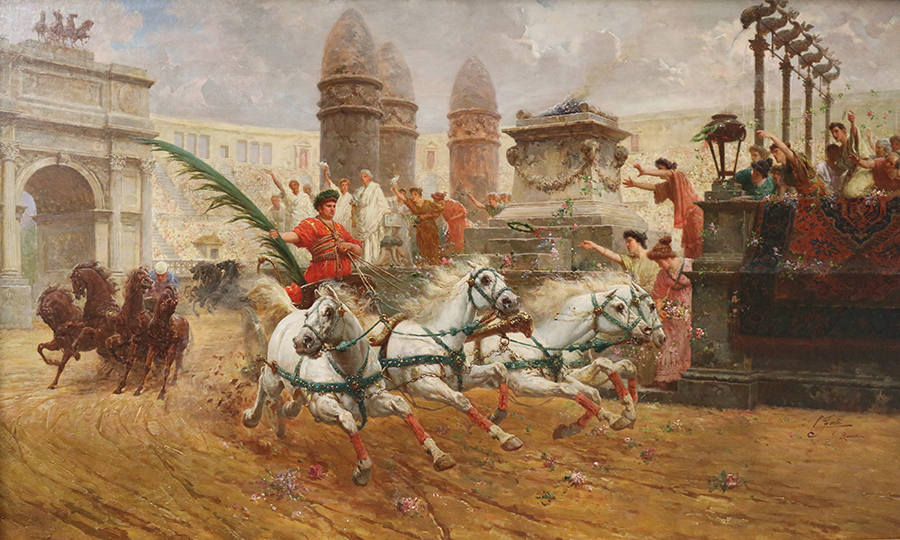
Greeting The Victor

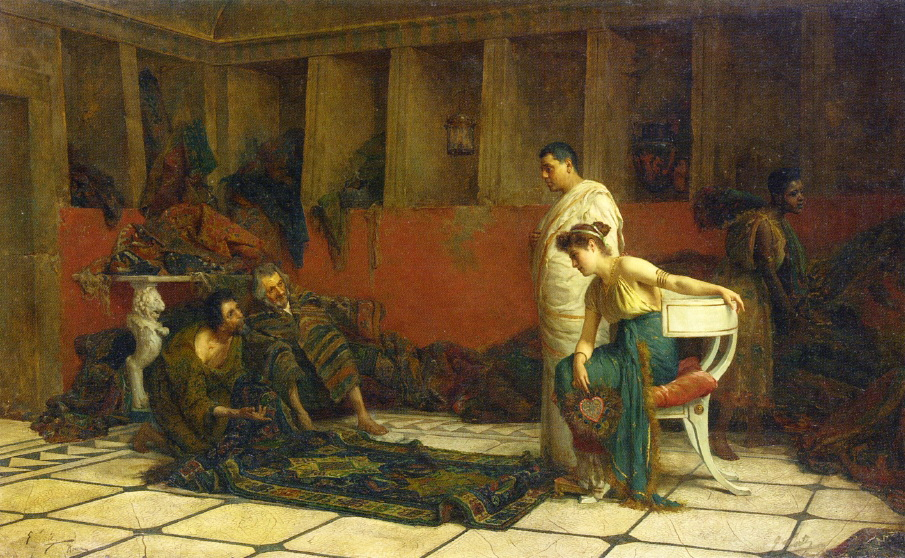
Rug Merchants

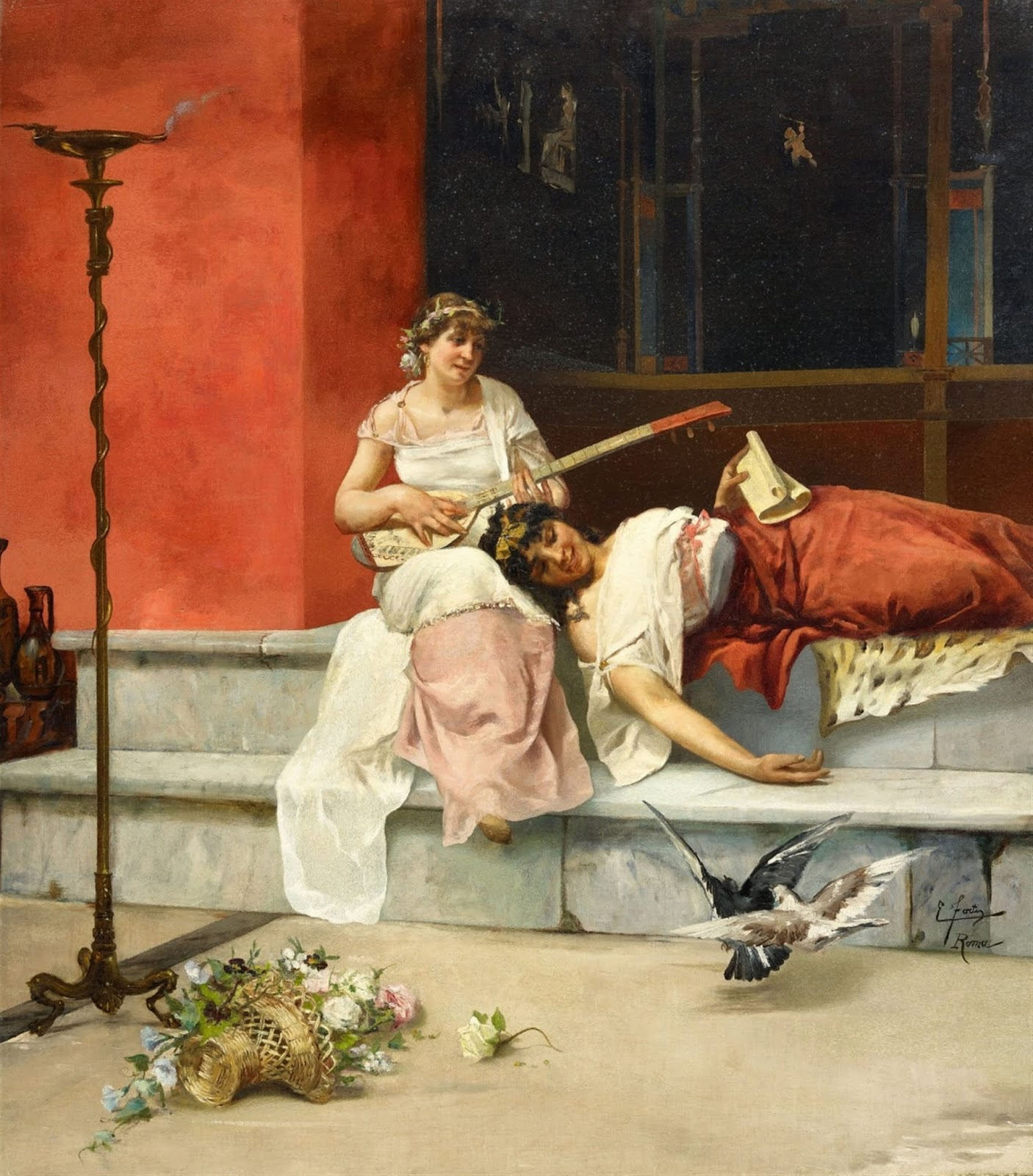
The Musicians

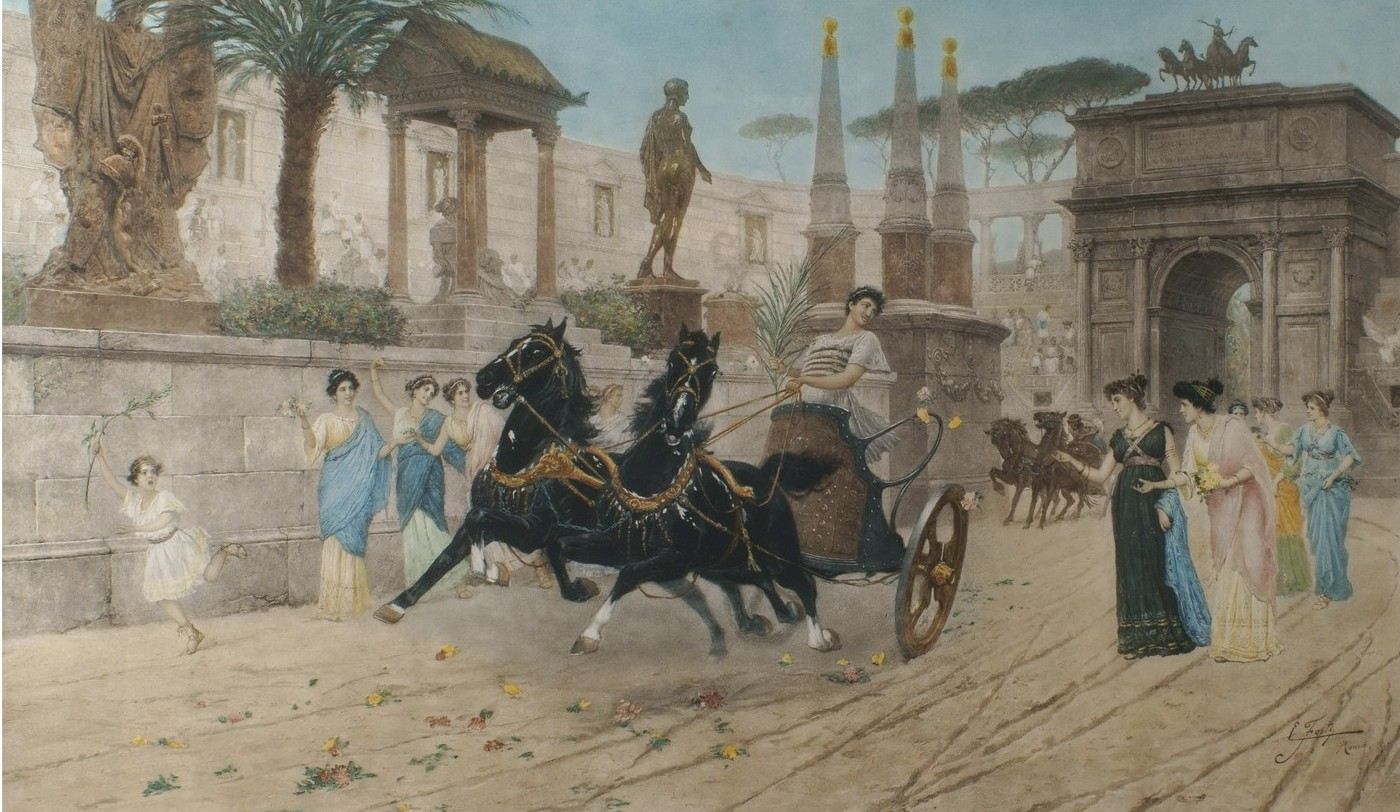
Victory

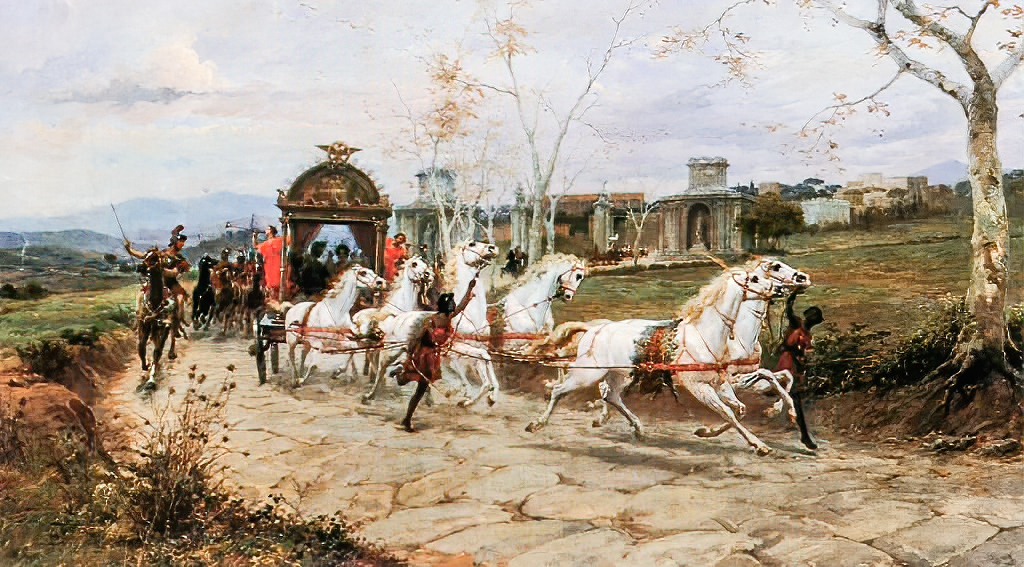
Arrival of Caesar

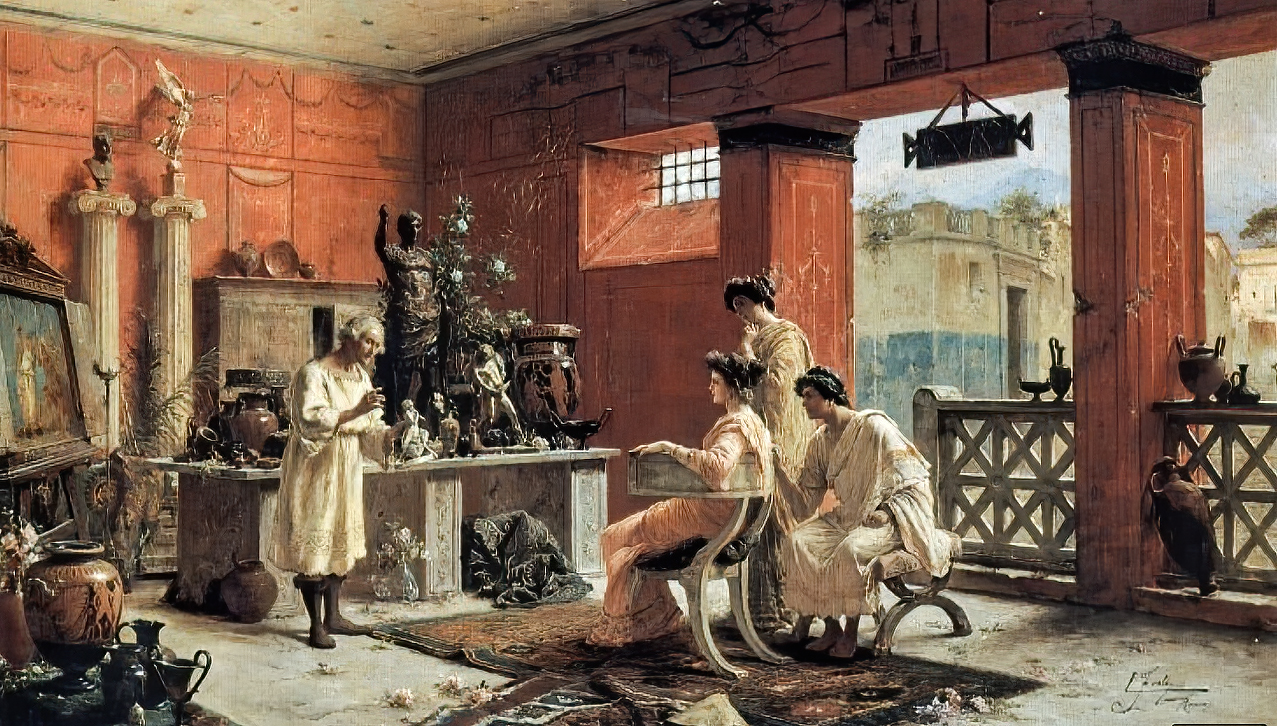
At the Antiquarian's

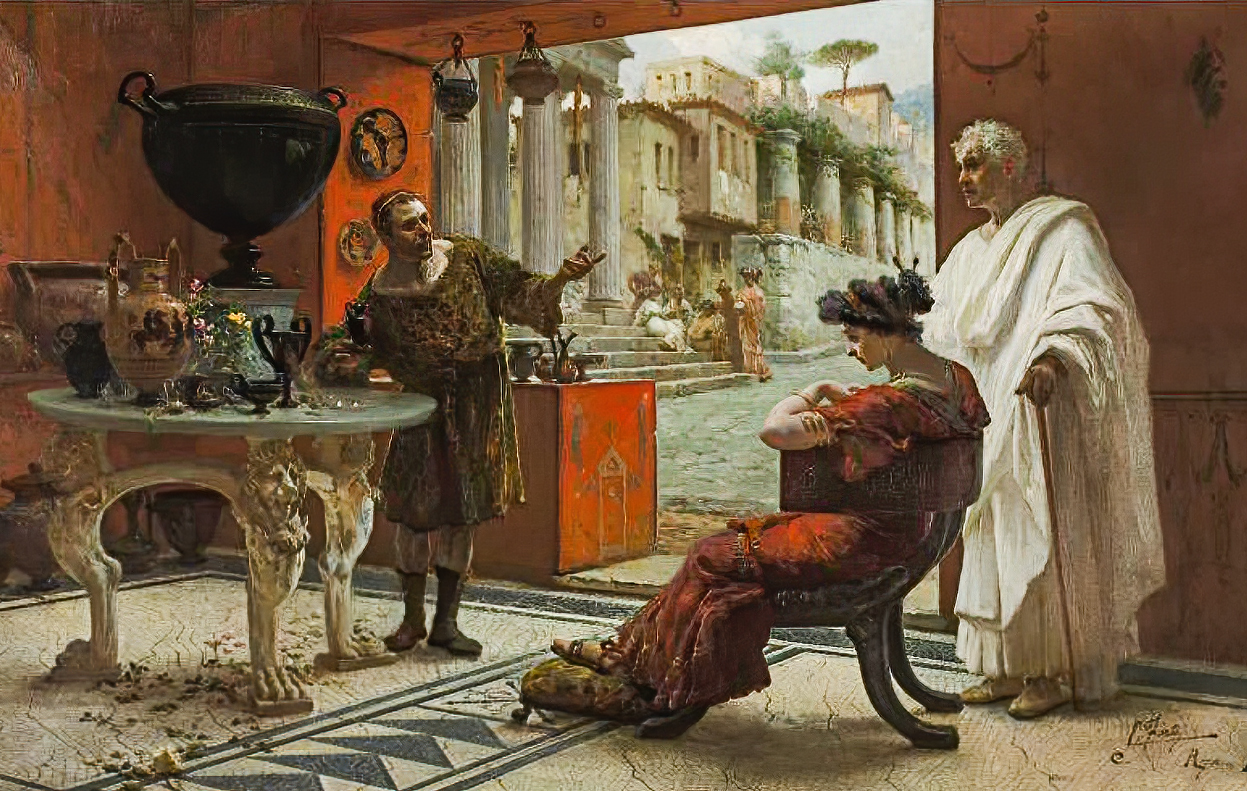
The Vendor of Antiquities

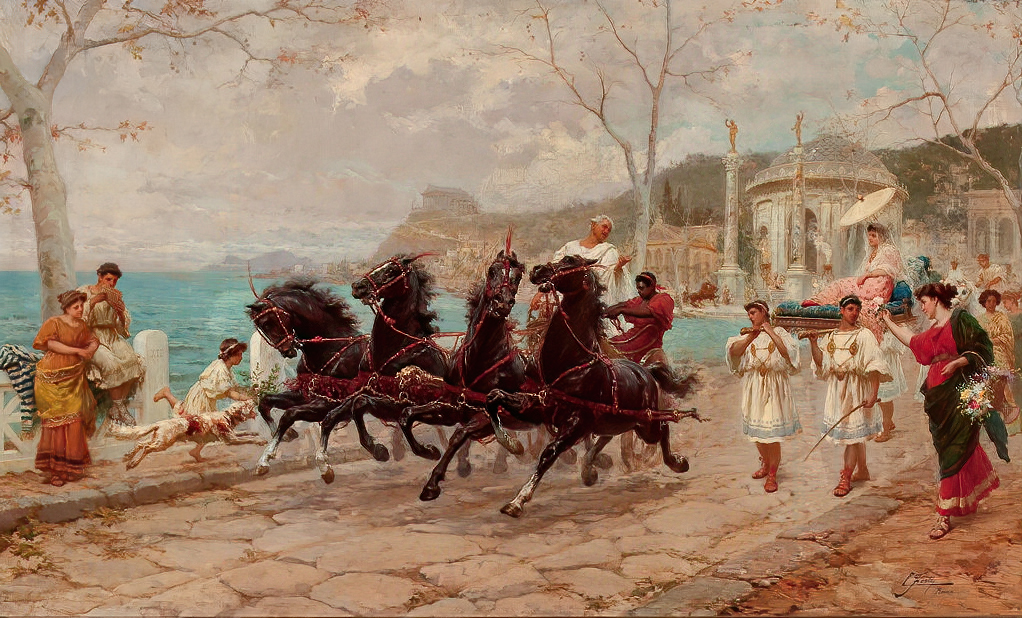
Quadriga on the Road to Pompeii(?)

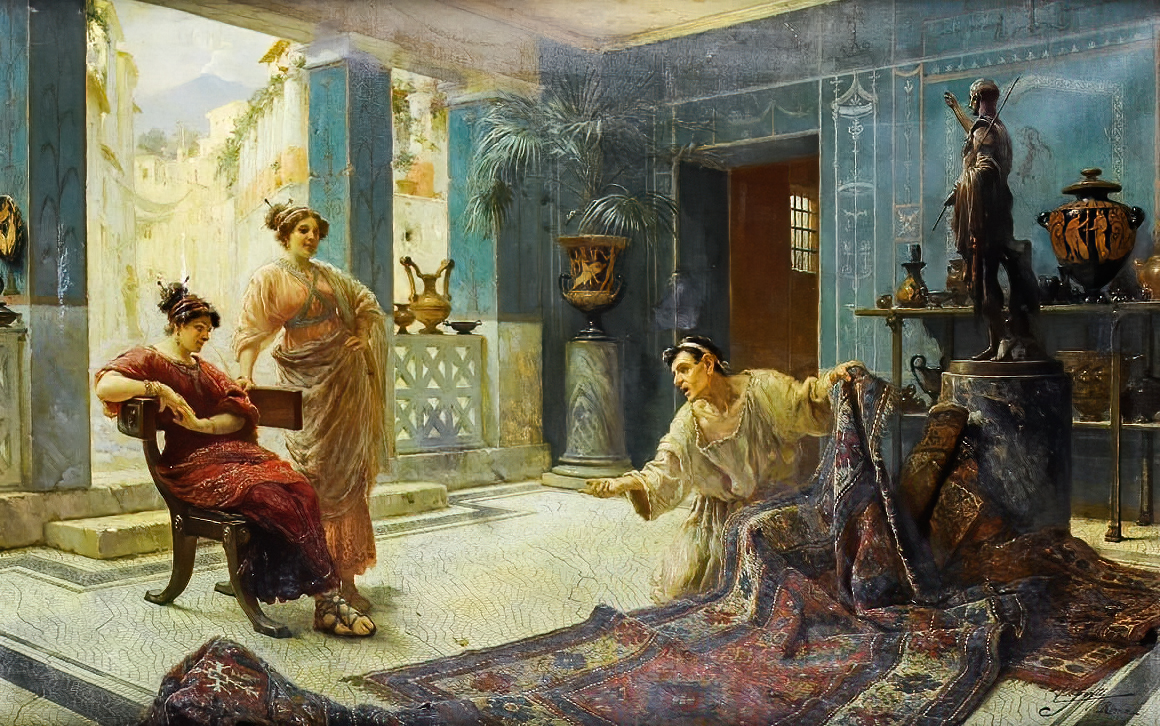
The Carpet Seller (6)

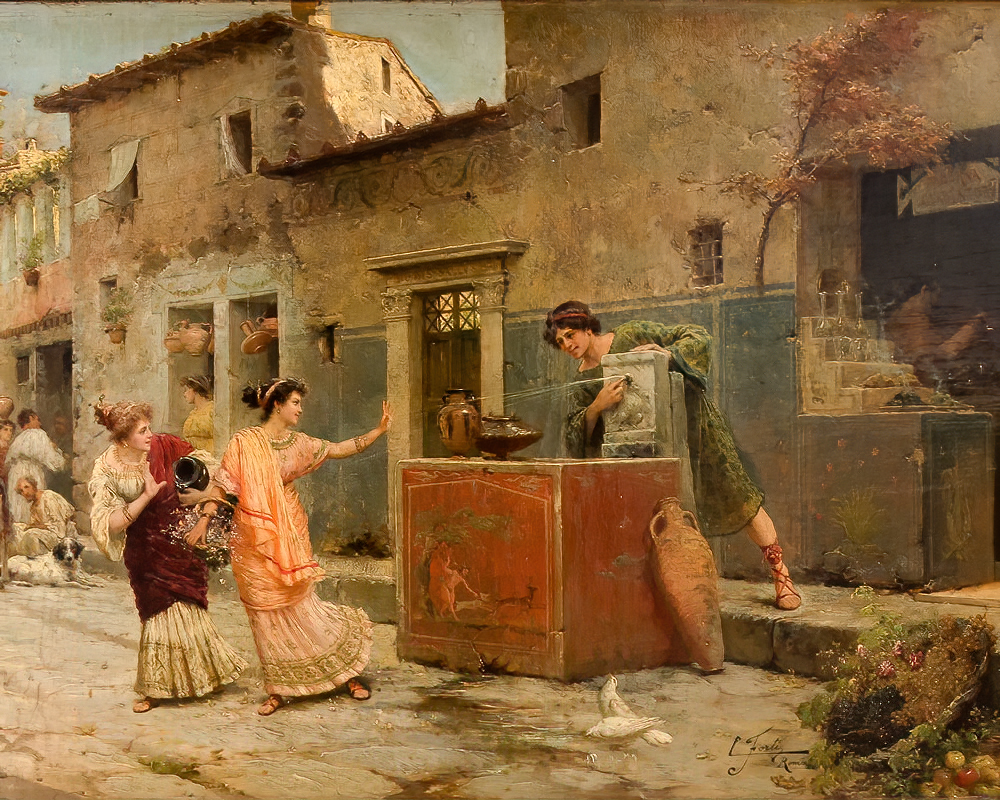
Roman Street Scene

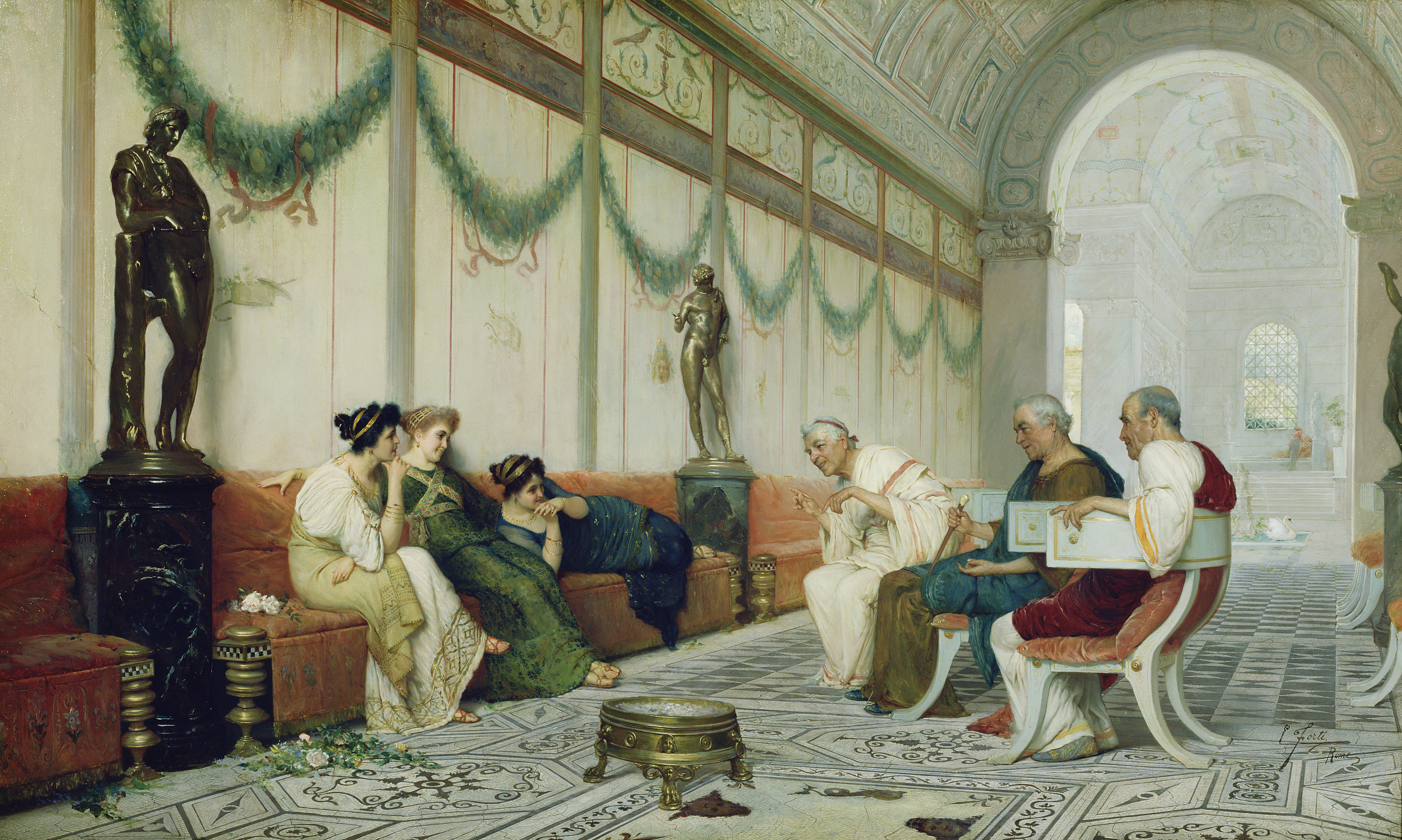
Interior of a Roman Building with Figures
